= Omsk Oblast Police =

Regional police force in Russia

Coordinates: 54.988966°N 73.367298°E

Main Directorate of the Ministry of Internal Affairs for the Omsk Oblast Управление МВД России по Омской области
- Common name: Omsk Oblast Police
- Motto: “Serving Russia, Serving the Law!”

Agency overview
- Formed: 1918
- Employees: 8,000 (2025)

Jurisdictional structure
- Operations jurisdiction: Omsk Oblast, Russia
- Governing body: Ministry of Internal Affairs of the Russian Federation
- Constituting instrument: Law on Police
- General nature: Local civilian police

Operational structure
- Headquarters: Omsk
- Elected officer responsible: Vladimir Kolokoltsev, Minister of Internal Affairs
- Agency executive: Vadim Bolotov
- Parent agency: Ministry of Internal Affairs of the Russian Federation
- Units: List: Criminal Investigative Department; Federal Migratory Service; Traffic Police; OMON; Special Force

Website
- Official Site

The Directorate of the Ministry of Internal Affairs of the Russian Federation for the Omsk Oblast (Russian: Управление МВД России по Омской области, romanized: Upravleniye MVD Rossii po Omskoy oblasti) is a territorial body of executive power that performs functions to implement state policy in the field of internal affairs in the Omsk Oblast.

The main tasks of the directorate are to ensure Public Safety, protect the Rights and Freedoms of Man and Citizen, combat Crime, maintain Public Order, and control migration processes.

The head of the Regional Directorate of the Ministry of Internal Affairs of Russia is appointed and dismissed by the President of the Russian Federation on the proposal of the Minister of Internal Affairs of the Russian Federation. Since 2024, the directorate has been headed by Police Major General Vadim Vladimirovich Bolotov.

The legal address is: Russia, 644099, Omsk, Lenin Street, 2.

The structure of the directorate includes operational, investigative, inquiry, patrol, and specialized units, as well as departments for migration issues, information technology, public order protection, drug enforcement, economic and cybercrime.

== History ==
The first police functions in the territory of the modern Omsk Oblast were performed by the forces of the Siberian Cossacks and the Omsk Fortress Administration, established by Peter I in 1716. The formal establishment of the regional police system is associated with the creation of the Omsk Governorate in 1822 according to M. M. Speransky's "Institution for the Administration of Governorates."

Key Milestones:

- 1867 – Establishment of the Omsk City Police Department as part of the Judicial reform of Alexander II.
- 1917 – After the October Revolution, the police were transformed into the People's Militsiya of Petrograd (within the Omsk Governorate).
- 1920 – Formation of the Omsk Governorate Militsiya as part of the NKVD of the RSFSR.
- 1941–1945 – The Militsiya ensured law and order during the evacuation of industrial enterprises to Omsk.
- 1965 – Opening of the Omsk Higher Militsiya School (later – the Omsk Academy of the Ministry of Internal Affairs).

Modern Period:

- 2011 – Transition to a federal police model as part of the Russian police reform.
- 2023 – Implementation of the "Safe City" system, integrating over 1700 video cameras and 225 stationary complexes for photo and video recording of traffic violations.

== Leaders ==
=== Omsk People's Militsiya ===
Period	Full Name	Position	Source
December 1917 – May 1918	Pyotr Sergeyevich Uspensky	First Commissioner of the Militsiya of Omsk (Chief of the Militsiya)	
1919–1920	Yefim Davidovich Spian	Head of the Militsiya of the city of Omsk	
1918–1920	Pyotr Yakovlevich Petrukho	Organizer of the Militsiya of the Omsk Oblast (Service in the Cheka/Militsiya)	
1919	Artem Kuzmich Strizhak-Vasilenko	Head of the Militsiya of Omsk (Executed)	

=== UNKVD for the Omsk Oblast ===
Period	Full Name	Position	Rank	Source
December 17, 1934 – July 23, 1937	Eduard Petrovich Salyn	Head of the NKVD for the Omsk Oblast	Senior Major of State Security from 1935	
July 23 - August 19, 1937	Grigory Fedorovich Gorbach	Head of the NKVD for the Omsk Oblast	Major of State Security	
August 19, 1937 - April 27, 1938	Konstantin Nikolaevich Valukhin	Head of the NKVD for the Omsk Oblast	Captain of State Security	
May 22, 1938 - January 25, 1939	Zotik Andreevich Volokhov	Head of the NKVD for the Omsk Oblast (arrested)	Captain of State Security	
January 28, 1939 – February 26, 1941	Mikhail Yegorovich Zakharov	Head of the NKVD for the Omsk Oblast	Captain of State Security	
1939-1946	Vasily Ivanovich Galkin	Head of the NKVD for the Omsk Oblast	Militsiya Commissioner	

=== UVD for the Omsk Oblast ===
Period	Full Name	Position	Rank	Source
August 6, 1946 – December 20, 1950	Fedor Ignatievich Petrov	Head of the UVD for the Omsk Oblast	Police Colonel	
August 6, 1946 – December 20, 1950	Fedor Ignatievich Petrov	Head of the UVD for the Omsk Oblast	Police Colonel	
January 17, 1951 – March 16, 1953	Georgy Grigoryevich Chukreev	Head of the UVD for the Omsk Oblast	Police Lieutenant Colonel	
March 16, 1953 – March 27, 1954	Semyon Fedorovich Gorbunov	Head of the UVD for the Omsk Oblast	KGB Colonel	
1954 – 1964	Nikolai Ivanovich Manukovsky	Head of the UVD for the Omsk Oblast	Police Colonel	
June 1964 – August 1970	Alexander Smirnov	Head of the UVD of the Omsk Oblast Executive Committee	Police Major General	
August 1970 – March 1984	Ivan Alekseev	Head of the UVD of the Omsk Oblast Executive Committee	Police Major General	
March 1984 – 1991	Vladimir Obraztsov	Head of the UVD of the Omsk Oblast Executive Committee	Police Major General	
1991 – 1994	Viktor Lotkov	Head of the UVD of the Omsk Oblast	Police Major General	
1994 – 2000	Yevgeny Storozhenko	Head of the UVD for the Omsk Oblast	Police Lieutenant General	

=== UMVD for the Omsk Oblast ===
Period	Full Name	Position	Rank	Source
2000 – 2010	Viktor Kamertsel	Head of the UMVD for the Omsk Oblast	Police Major General	
2010 – 2016	Yuri Tomchak	Head of the UMVD for the Omsk Oblast	Police Lieutenant General	
June 2016 - December 2016	Lyubov Aksyonova	Acting Head of the UMVD for the Omsk Oblast	Police Colonel	
December 2016 – Late 2019	Leonid Kolomiets	Head of the UMVD for the Omsk Oblast	Police Major General	
March 2020 – February 2024	Vyacheslav Kryuchkov	Head of the UMVD for the Omsk Oblast	Police Lieutenant General	
February 2024	Alexey Shelkov	Acting Head of the UMVD for the Omsk Oblast	Police Colonel	
February 2024 – Present	Vadim Bolotov	Head of the UMVD for the Omsk Oblast	Police Major General	
