= Alexander Grigoryevich Smirnov =

Alexander Grigorievich Smirnov
- Born: August 31, 1917 village Krugly Bor, Cherepovetsky District, Vologda Governorate, RSFSR
- Died: 1970s Omsk, USSR
- Military career
- Allegiance: Soviet Union
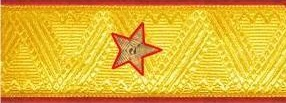
- Rank: : Major General of Police
- Commands: Head of the Omsk Oblast Department of Internal Affairs
- Awards: Jubilee Medal "In Commemoration of the 100th Anniversary of the Birth of Vladimir Ilyich Lenin" Medal "For Distinction in the Protection of Public Order"

Alexander Grigorievich Smirnov (Russian: Александр Григорьевич Смирнов; born August 31, 1917, village Krugly Bor, Cherepovetsky District, Vologda Governorate — 1970s, Omsk, USSR) — Soviet leader of the internal affairs bodies, Major General of Police. Head of the Department of Internal Affairs of the Omsk Regional Executive Committee (1964–1970), Head of the ITLK of the UMJ of the Omsk Oblast (1955–1957). Honored Worker of the Ministry of Internal Affairs of the USSR.

== Biography ==
- 1964–1970: Head of the Department of Internal Affairs of the Omsk Regional Executive Committee:
- The exact date of death and burial place have not been established – according to contemporaries, he died in the late 1970s.

== Political activities ==
- Elected as a deputy to district, city and regional Soviets of People's Deputies.

== Awards ==
- 7 jubilee medals for commemorative dates of the USSR
