= Vadim Bolotov =

Vadim Vladimirovich Bolotov
- Born: 1973 (age 52–53); Gorno-Altaysk, Russia
- Education: Gorno-Altaysk State University; Academy of Management of the Ministry of Internal Affairs of Russia (2014)
- Military career
- Allegiance: Russia
- Service years: 1994-
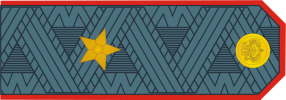
- Rank: : Major General of Police
- Commands: Head of the Department of the Ministry of Internal Affairs of Russia for the Omsk Region (2024-present); Deputy Minister of Internal Affairs for the Altai Republic – Chief of Police (2020 – 2024)
- Awards: Medal of the Order "For Merit to the Fatherland" 2nd Class; Medal "For Distinction in the Protection of Public Order" and other.

Vadim Vladimirovich Bolotov (Russian: Вадим Владимирович Болотов; born 1973) is a Russian figure in the internal affairs bodies, Major General of Police, a specialist in the field of law enforcement and combating crime. Deputy Minister of Internal Affairs for the Altai Republic – Chief of Police from 2020 to 2024. Head of the Department of the Ministry of Internal Affairs of Russia for the Omsk Oblast since 2024.

== Career ==
Vadim Bolotov was born in 1973 in the city of Gorno-Altaysk.

In 1994, he began his service in the internal affairs bodies, joining as a junior inspector of an operational search group. From that moment on, his entire service has been connected with operational work in criminal units.

In 2009, he graduated from Gorno-Altaysk State University.

In 2014, he completed his studies at the Academy of Management of the Ministry of Internal Affairs of Russia.

From 2009 to 2020, he successively held leadership positions in the ministry of internal affairs of the Altai Republic, specializing in combating drug trafficking and solving serious crimes.

On April 30, 2020, he was appointed Deputy Minister of Internal Affairs for the Altai Republic — Chief of Police of the region, where he was responsible for the general management of operational services and the implementation of anti-corruption measures.

In late February 2024, he was appointed Acting Head of the Russian Ministry of Internal Affairs Department for the Omsk Region. He was introduced to the personnel by Deputy Minister of Internal Affairs of the Russian Federation Colonel General Andrey Khrapov.

In May 2024, he was approved as Head of the Department of the Ministry of Internal Affairs of Russia for the Omsk Region, replacing Lieutenant General Vyacheslav Kryuchkov.

In June 2025, he received the rank of Major General of Police by decree of the President of the Russian Federation.

== Awards ==
- Honorary Employee of the Ministry of Internal Affairs;
- Medal of the Order "For Merit to the Fatherland" II degree;
- Medal "For Distinction in the Protection of Public Order";
- Medal "For Battle Commonwealth";
- Medal "For Distinction in Service" (Ministry of Internal Affairs) of three degrees;
- Medal "For Valor in Service" (Ministry of Internal Affairs).
