= Moscow police =

Moscow police can mean either of the following:

- Moscow City Police, primary responsibilities in law enforcement and investigation in the City of Moscow
- Moscow Oblast Police, polices the Region of Moscow
