= Viktor Lotkov =

Soviet and Russian politician (born 1946)

Viktor Nikolayevich Lotkov
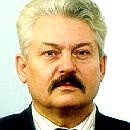
- Born: December 31, 1946; Orenburg, RSFSR, USSR
- Alma mater: Omsk Higher School of Militia
- Military career
- Allegiance: Soviet Union
- Other work: Politician, Deputy of the 1st State Duma

Viktor Nikolayevich Lotkov (Russian: Виктор Николаевич Лотков'; born December 31, 1946, Orenburg, RSFSR, USSR) is a Soviet and Russian lawyer, political figure, Head of the Department of Internal Affairs of the Omsk Oblast, People’s Deputy of the RSFSR, Deputy of the State Duma of the 1st convocation (1993—1995), Police Major General.

== Biography ==
From 1981 to 1982, he served in Afghanistan. In 1982, he received a higher education in law from the Omsk Higher School of Militia. He worked at the Omsk Higher School of Militia as a senior lecturer in the department, and headed the Department of Internal Affairs of the Omsk Oblast Administration.

In 1990, he was elected to Congress of People's Deputies of Russia from the Omsk Oblast. In the Supreme Soviet of the RSFSR, he was the chairman of the subcommittee of the Committee of the Supreme Soviet on matters of legality, law and order, and combating crime.

In 1993, he was elected a deputy of the State Duma of the Federal Assembly of the Russian Federation of the first convocation from the Omsk single-member electoral district No. 129. In the State Duma, he was a member of the Committee on the Organization of the Work of the State Duma and was a member of the Deputy Group “Stability”.

In 1995, he ran for the position of head of the Omsk Oblast and took second place in the election.
