= Yevgeny Storozhenko =

Soviet and Russian law enforcement official

Yevgeny Afanasyevich Storozhenko
- Born: August 20, 1938; Mokhovoy Prival village, Muromtsevsky District, RSFSR, USSR
- Died: 2005 (aged 66–67)
- Alma mater: Sverdlovsk Law Institute (1965)
- Military career
- Allegiance: Soviet Union → Russia
- Service years: 1961–1998
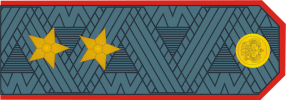
- Rank: : Lieutenant General
- Commands: Head of the Department of Internal Affairs of the Omsk Region (1994-1998)
- Awards: Order "For Valiant Labor"; Medal "For Impeccable Service" 1st class Medal "For Impeccable Service" 2nd class Medal "For Impeccable Service" 3rd class Honorary Citizen of the City of Omsk
- Other work: Professor of the Department of Operational Investigative Activities, Omsk Academy of the Ministry of Internal Affairs of Russia (1999-2005)

Yevgeny Afanasyevich Storozhenko (August 20, 1938, Mokhovoy Prival village, Muromtsevsky District, Omsk Oblast, RSFSR, USSR – 2005) was a Soviet and Russian law enforcement official and expert in the field of combating economic crime. He was one of the organizers of specialized units of the Ministry of Internal Affairs (MVD) to combat drug trafficking and economic crimes in the Omsk Oblast. He is an Honored Employee of the Internal Affairs Bodies of the Russian Federation and an Honorary Citizen of the City of Omsk (2000). He is also a Professor in the Department of Operational Investigative Activities at the Omsk Academy of the Ministry of Internal Affairs.

== Biography ==
Yevgeny Storozhenko was born on August 20, 1938, in the village of Mokhovoy Prival, Muromtsevsky District, Omsk Oblast.

After graduating from school, he entered Vocational School No. 22 in the city of Omsk. He then worked as a toolmaker-layout worker at a defense plant (classified postal box No. 64).

In December 1961, on the recommendation of the October District Committee of the Communist Party of the Soviet Union (CPSU) in the city of Omsk, he was accepted for service in the internal affairs bodies.

In 1965, he graduated by correspondence from the Sverdlovsk Law Institute (now the Ural State Law University). During his studies, he was awarded the rank of Junior Lieutenant of the Militia and offered the position of operational officer in one of the district departments for combating the embezzlement of socialist property (OBKhSS).

He held the positions of head of the OBKhSS for the city of Omsk, and then head of the regional department for combating crimes in the economic sphere. For almost two decades, he led operational work in this area.

With the active participation of Y. A. Storozhenko, the city department and the regional department for combating drug trafficking, a specialized regiment of the Road Patrol Service|road patrol service (DPS), and a special-purpose detachment "Shturm" for serving in hot spots of the Russian Federation were created.

In 1999, he was dismissed from service in the internal affairs bodies. After retiring, he continued his work at the Omsk Academy of the Ministry of Internal Affairs of Russia, where he became a professor in the Department of Operational Investigative Activities. He conducted active teaching and research work, and was engaged in the training of young employees of the internal affairs bodies.

== Awards ==
- Order "For Valiant Labor"
- Honored Employee of the Internal Affairs Bodies of the Russian Federation
- Medal "For Impeccable Service" I, II, III class
- Honorary Citizen of the City of Omsk (2000)
- One of the streets in the Central Administrative District of Omsk is named after his name.

== Family ==
Son – Andrei Storozhenko, from June 13, 2012, to December 2018 – Minister of Health of Omsk Oblast.
