= Ivan Romanovich Alekseev =

Ivan Alekseev
- Иван Алексеев
- Born: January 7, 1918 village Novo-Znamenka, Znamensky District, Tambov Oblast, USSR
- Died: September 1, 1990 (aged 72); Omsk, Russia
- Education: Higher School of the Ministry of Internal Affairs of the USSR
- Spouse: Nina Voznesenskaya
- Children: Victoria, Andrey
- Military career
- Allegiance: Soviet Union
- Service years: Until 1984
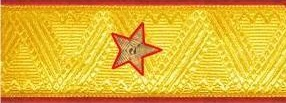
- Rank: : Major General of Police
- Commands: Head of the Omsk Oblast Department of Internal Affairs
- Awards: Order of the Patriotic War (1st class) Order of the Patriotic War (2nd class) Order of the Red Banner of Labour Order of the October Revolution Medal "For the Victory over Germany in the Great Patriotic War 1941–1945"
- Memorials: Street named after him in Omsk

Ivan Romanovich Alekseev (Russian: Иван Романович Алексеев; January 7, 1918 – September 1, 1990) was a Soviet official of the internal affairs bodies, Major General of Police, and the head of the Omsk Oblast Department of Internal Affairs from 1973 to 1984. He was one of the organizers of the systemic strengthening of the personnel and material base of the regional department of the Ministry of Internal Affairs.

== Early life and education ==
Alekseev was born on January 7, 1918, to a peasant family in the village of Novo-Znamenka, Pokrovo-Marfinsky Uyezd, Tambov Governorate. He attended Tambov Secondary School No. 2 and graduated in 1936. Alekseev then studied at the Institute for Advanced Training of Public Education Personnel from 1936 to 1939. He later continued his studies at the Velikiye Luki Military Infantry School of the Vologda Oblast.

== Career ==
In 1939, Alekseev became a secondary school teacher for the Uvarovo Village Council. The next year, the Central Committee of the All-Union Communist Party (Bolsheviks) named him to work in the special department of the NKVD.

From 1941 to 1945, Alekseev served as an operative of SMERSH in the operational apparatuses of combat units of the Voronezh Front. He participated in combat operations and was wounded on August 15, 1941, and again in 1943. During the Battle of Stalingrad and the battles for the liberation of the Voronezh Oblast in 1942–1943, he took part in military operations.

From 1945 to 1955, Alekseev taught special disciplines at the Tallinn Police School. From 1955 to 1957, he served as a senior teacher of special disciplines at the Kaliningrad Police School. In 1956, he studied at the Higher Party School.

Between December 1957 and June 1965, Alekseev, then a Lieutenant Colonel, served as head of the Omsk Police School of the Ministry of Internal Affairs of the USSR. From 1957 to 1970, he also headed the school's Party Committee. From 1964 to 1970, he served as Deputy Head of the Regional Directorate for the Protection of Public Order of the Omsk Oblast Executive Committee. From 1965 to 1970, he served as head of the Omsk Higher School of the Ministry of Internal Affairs.

From 1970 to 1984, Alekseev headed the Omsk Oblast Department of Internal Affairs.

Upon completion of his service, he continued to participate in the activities of veterans' and public organizations, gave lectures, and served as a mentor for the younger generation of police officers.

== Awards ==
For combat and labor merits, he was awarded 7 orders and 23 medals, among them:

- Two Orders of the Red Star
- Order of the Patriotic War 1st Class
- Order of the Patriotic War 2nd Class
- Two Orders of the Red Banner of Labour
- Order of the October Revolution
- Medal "For Battle Merit"
- Medal "For the Victory over Germany in the Great Patriotic War 1941–1945"
- Honored Employee of the Ministry of Public Order Protection
- One of the streets in the center of Omsk is named after Ivan Alekseev (2002).

== Personal life ==
Ivan Romanovich Alekseev met his future wife, Nina Voznesenskaya, at a front-line hospital in 1944, where Nina worked as a doctor. Their marriage was solemnized at the front, shortly after Alekseev's appointment as head of counterintelligence. According to Nina's recollections, there was no courtship as such, but Alekseev's feelings were expressed in his actions. They lived together for 46 years, 4 months, and 18 days. In 1945, they had a daughter, Victoria, who became a doctor, and in 1956, a son, Andrey, who followed in his father's footsteps and rose to the rank of general.
