= Vladimir Ovchinsky =

- Born: February 23, 1955; Moscow
- Occupations: Criminologist, jurist
- Employers: All Russian Research Institute of the Ministry of Internal Affairs (1986–1992); Constitutional Court of Russia (2004–2011); Moscow Oblast Police (1976–1986); Moskovskiye Novosti (1999–2001); SUAL Group (2001–2002)
- Awards: Honoured Lawyer of Russia

Vladimir Semyonovich Ovchinsky (Russian: Владимир Семёнович Овчинский; born 1955) is a Russian criminologist, Major general, Doctor of Sciences in Jurisprudence, Professor, 3rd class Active State Councillor of the Russian Federation (2006), Honoured Lawyer of Russia. From 1995 to 1997, he was an assistant to the Minister of Internal Affairs of Russia. From 1997 to 1999, he was the head of the Russian Bureau of Interpol. Former advisor to the Collective Security Treaty Organization.

He was born into the family of Professor S.S. Ovchinsky. He graduated with honors from the Omsk Academy of the Ministry of Internal Affairs in 1976. He studied with Vladimir Rushailo.

From 1976 to 1986, he worked at Moscow Oblast Police.

From 1999 to 2001, he was a journalist for the Moskovskiye Novosti.

From 2001 to 2002, he was the vice-president of the SUAL Group.

From 2004 to 2011, he was Advisor to the Chairman of the Constitutional Court of the Russian Federation.

He is a member of the Council for Foreign and Defense Policy. He is also a member of the Izborsky Club.

He published in the Ogoniok.

He used to be a friend of Sergey Karaganov.

Ovchinsky called himself a student of Pobisk Kuznetsov.
