= Vyacheslav Kryuchkov =

Russian government official (born 1977)

Vyacheslav Gennadyevich Kryuchkov
- Born: May 5, 1977; Nalchik, Kabardino-Balkaria, Russian SFSR
- Alma mater: Nalchik Branch of the Rostov Law Institute of the Ministry of Internal Affairs of Russia (2003); Academy of Management of the Ministry of Internal Affairs of Russia (2014)
- Children: 3
- Military career
- Allegiance: Russia
- Service years: 1997-Present
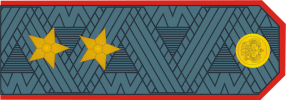
- Rank: : Lieutenant general of Police
- Commands: Head of the Department of the Ministry of Internal Affairs of Russia for the Omsk Region (2020-2024); Minister of Internal Affairs for the Kabardino-Balkar Republic (2024-Present)
- Awards: Medal of the Order "For Merit to the Fatherland" 3rd Class; Medal "For Distinction in Service," 1st Class; Medal "For Distinction in Service," 2nd Class; Medal "For Distinction in Service," 3rd Class; Medal "For Valor in Service"; Medal "For Military Cooperation" (Federal Protective Service); Badge "Honorary Employee of the Ministry of Internal Affairs"

Vyacheslav Gennadyevich Kryuchkov (Russian: Вячеслав Геннадьевич Крючков; born May 5, 1977, Nalchik, Kabardino-Balkaria) is a Russian figure in the Ministry of Internal Affairs, holding the rank of Lieutenant General of Police. He specializes in law enforcement and combating crime. He served as the Head of the Ministry of Internal Affairs for the Omsk Region from 2020 to 2024. Since April 1, 2024, he has been the Minister of Internal Affairs for Kabardino-Balkaria.

== Early life and education ==
Vyacheslav Gennadyevich Kryuchkov was born on May 5, 1977, in the city of Nalchik.

From 1995 to 1997, he served in the Armed Forces of the Russian Federation.

In 2003, he graduated from the Nalchik branch of the Rostov Law Institute of the Ministry of Internal Affairs of Russia with a degree in jurisprudence, and in 2014, he graduated with honors from the Academy of Management of the Ministry of Internal Affairs of Russia.

== Career ==
=== Ministry of Internal Affairs ===
==== Karbardino-Balkaria (1997-2011) ====
In 1997, he joined the internal affairs bodies in the engineering and technical department of the special purpose police detachment of the Ministry of Internal Affairs of Kabardino-Balkaria.

From 1999 to 2008, he served in operational positions in the Directorate for Combating Organized Crime in the republic's Ministry of Internal Affairs.

In 2009, he headed the Prokhladny Department of Internal Affairs. A year later, he was approved as the head of the Criminal Investigation Directorate of the Ministry of Internal Affairs for Kabardino-Balkaria.

From 2011, he served as the head representative of Kabardino-Balkaria in the Centre for Combating Extremism.

==== Omsk Region (2011-2024) ====
In 2011, he transferred to the Ministry of Internal Affairs of Russia for the Omsk Region, serving as the head of the department for organizing operational search activities of the police of the Ministry of Internal Affairs.

From 2012 to 2017, he held the positions of head of the Omsk Region Department of Economic Security and Combating Corruption of the police, and Deputy Chief of Police (for operational work), both within the Ministry of Internal Affairs for the Omsk Region. On May 3, 2017, he was appointed Deputy Head of the Department – Head of the Police Department of the Ministry of Internal Affairs for the Omsk Region.

On March 18, 2020, by decree of the President of the Russian Federation, police colonel Kryuchkov was appointed Head of the Ministry of Internal Affairs for the Omsk Region.

On June 11, 2021, by decree of the President of the Russian Federation, Kryuchkov was awarded the special rank of higher commanding staff - major general of police.

==== Karbardino-Balkaria (2024-present) ====
Since April 1, 2024, he has been the Minister of Internal Affairs for Kabardino-Balkaria.

On June 4, 2025, by decree of the President of the Russian Federation, Kryuchkov was awarded the special rank of higher commanding staff - lieutenant general of police.

== Awards ==
- Badge "Honorary Employee of the Ministry of Internal Affairs"
- Medal of the Order "For Merit to the Fatherland" II class
- Medal "For Distinction in the Protection of Public Order"
- Medal "For Merit in Management Activities" III class
- Medal "For Distinction in Service" (3 classes)
- Medal "For Valor in Service" of the Ministry of Internal Affairs
- Medal "For Battle Commonwealth"
- Honorary weapon Makarov pistol

== Personal life ==
Kryuchkov is married and has three daughters.
