= Vladimir Nikolayevich Obraztsov =

Soviet and Russian leader at various levels

- Владимир Образцов
- Born: August 15, 1935; Omsk Oblast, RSFSR, USSR
- Died: November 26, 2000 (aged 65); Omsk, Russia
- Alma mater: Law Faculty of Omsk State University
- Military career
- Allegiance: Soviet Union → Russia
- Service years: Until 1991
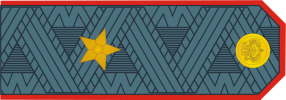
- Rank: : Major General of Police
- Commands: Head of the Omsk Oblast Department of Internal Affairs

Vladimir Nikolayevich Obraztsov (Russian: Владимир Николаевич Образцов; born August 15, 1935, Omsk Oblast, RSFSR, USSR – November 26, 2000, Omsk, Russia) was a Soviet and Russian leader of various levels of party organs and a prominent figure in the internal affairs bodies, with the special rank of Police Major General. He served as the Head of the Department of Internal Affairs of the Omsk Oblast Executive Committee from 1984 to 1991.

== Biography ==
Vladimir Nikolayevich Obraztsov was born on August 15, 1935, in the Omsk Oblast, RSFSR, USSR. He graduated from the Law Faculty of Omsk State University. From 1956 to 1958, he served in the ranks of the Soviet Army.

From 1961 to 1984, he worked in Komsomol, party, and Soviet bodies, holding positions such as First Secretary of the Soviet District Committee of the Komsomol, Second Secretary of the Soviet District Committee of the CPSU, Chairman of the Soviet District Executive Committee, Deputy Chairman of the Omsk City Executive Committee, Secretary of the City Committee of the CPSU, and Head of the Department of Administrative Bodies of the Omsk Regional Committee of the Party.

In March 1984, by decision of the bureau of the Omsk Regional Committee of the CPSU, he was directed to work in the internal affairs bodies – appointed as the Head of the Department of internal affairs of the Omsk Oblast. Possessing solid theoretical and managerial experience, he consistently pursued a course towards strengthening the interaction of internal affairs bodies with labor collectives and the population.

On his initiative, a social development program was developed and implemented, which made it possible to resolve housing and medical issues for employees of the Department of Internal Affairs. Under his leadership, the department achieved high results in the fight against crime, ensuring law and order, and personnel policy.

For its successful activities and the training of personnel, the Department of Internal Affairs was recognized as the winner of the All-Union competition dedicated to the 70th anniversary of the Soviet militia and was awarded the Red Banner of the Ministry of Internal Affairs of the USSR, which was left for permanent storage in Omsk. During his leadership, the Omsk Oblast was classified as a region with a stable crime situation, and Obraztsov himself was elected as a member of the board of the Ministry of Internal Affairs of the USSR as the head of one of the basic departments of the Ministry of Internal Affairs system.

After retiring in the early 1990s, he engaged in public activities. He died on November 26, 2000, in the city of Omsk.

== Awards ==
- Medal "For Labour Valour"
- Medal "For Valiant Labour"
- Medal "For Excellent Service in the Protection of Public Order"
- Badge "50 Years of the Soviet Militia"
