= Izborsky Club =

Russian conservative think tank

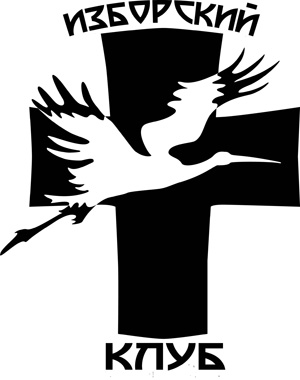
- Formation: September 2012
- Type: think tank
- Headquarters: Russia, Moscow, Frunzenskaya Embankment, 18, office VI
- Members: 27
- Leader: Alexander Prokhanov

The Izborsky Club is a Russian conservative think tank which specializes in studying Russia's foreign and domestic policy.

It was founded by publicist Alexander Prokhanov in September 2012 and includes several well-known nationalist and traditionalist intellectuals in Russia.

== History ==
The Izborsky club was created by a group of Russian intellectuals in September 2012 amidst celebration of the 1,150th anniversary of the city of Izborsk with support from Pskov regional governor Andrey Turchak. The writer Alexander Prokhanov was elected chairman of the club, and Vitaly Averyanov and Alexander Alekseevich Nagorny were elected executive secretaries. According to German political scientist Andreas Umland, the club includes an ultra-conservative flank of supporters of Russian President Vladimir Putin.

The organization took its name from the Pskov village of Izborsk near the border with Estonia, where its first meeting took place on the eve of its 1,150th anniversary celebration. The club's meetings, according to official information on its website, were held in Yekaterinburg, Ulyanovsk, St. Petersburg, Saratov, Bryansk, Belgorod, Tula, Kaluga, Omsk, Nizhny Novgorod, Orenburg, Donetsk and other cities, as well as in Yakutia, Dagestan and in Crimea. Field meetings of the club were held in Transnistria (Moldova), Syria, Serbia, China, Iran and other countries.

Since 2013, the Izborsky Club has published an eponymous magazine with 1,200-copy circulation.

In 2015, the organization received a 10 million ruble presidential grant for non-profit organizations. The project's description stated that the organization would attempt to explain "what is the Russian world".

== Goals and objectives ==
The Izborsky club's main tasks include:

- Creating and presenting analytical reports to Russian authorities and society aimed at forming an updated patriotically oriented state policy in all spheres of national life;
- Conducting trips to Russian regions, maintaining constant interaction with the country's intellectual elite without being locked in capital experts;
- Creating club divisions in all federal districts of the Russian Federation;
- Formation of a new agenda in the Russian media, the conquest of information niches that objectively arise in connection with the ideological and moral decline of the liberal community, which until recently sought to control the main electronic, as well as a large share of paper and online media at the federal level;
- Contributing to form a powerful political and ideological coalition of patriotic statesmen, an imperial front that opposes manipulation in Russian politics carried out by foreign centers of influence and the “fifth column” from within the country.

Among the club's activities is reconciling historical eras and synthesis of the best that was in them.

Shortly after its founding, on January 9, 2013, the Izborsky Club issued the "Ulyanovsk Declaration" with an appeal to all patriots:

As a means of averting an impending catastrophe, we call on all statesmen who value the future of Russia to act as a united patriotic, imperial front that opposes the liberal globalization ideology and its adherents, who act in the interests of our geopolitical enemies. The most important aspect of our unity is a correct understanding of the current difficult situation. Russia needs a fusion of two powerful energies that grow out of the "red" and "white" ideologies of Russian patriotism. This merger implies introducing into the structure and system of the state of a powerful element of social justice, which is inherited from the USSR, and a return to the Orthodox-Christian spirituality and universality of traditional Russia. Such a synthesis will make our country and state invincible, and will make it possible to offer humanity a universal path of social development based on the experience of Russian civilization.

== Influence ==
The organization has significant financial resources and connections in the Kremlin. Its meetings were attended by the Minister of Culture of the Russian Federation Vladimir Medinsky, governors of many regions and presidents of national republics (Yakutia, Dagestan, Chechnya). It is believed that the Izborsky Club reflects the views of the conservative members of the Russian elite.

The club has an official publisher of literature: the publishing house "Knizhny Mir".

== Criticism and scandals ==
The activities and ideals of the Izborsky Club were subjected to severe criticism from the leading researcher of the Russian Institute of Strategic Studies Peter Multatuli :

The ideology of the "Izbortsy" can be called by the name of their chairman Alexander Prokhanov - "Prokhanovism", as the Bolsheviks liked to give such definitions. This phenomenon is extremely dangerous precisely because of its conciliation, an attempt to connect the incompatible, white with black, God with the devil. "Prokhanovshchina" is much more dangerous than the overt communist and radical leftist ideology ... Prokhanov wants to unite executioners and victims, destroyers and creators, revolutionaries and guardians. An attempt to unite good and evil is the most dangerous basis of "Prokhanovism".

Publicist Elena Chudinova criticizes the Izborsky Club, believing that its members adhere to isolationist views.

In May 2015, by order of the Izborsky Club, the “Reigning Icon of the Mother of God” was made, on which, together with Joseph Stalin, Soviet marshals were depicted. The presentation took place during the awarding of the Prokhorovskoye Pole literary prize in the Belgorod Region. Alexander Prokhanov compared the Soviet historical figure to Moses and Mao Zedong, calling him a victorious leader, a leader with a flag of victory. Authors of the article on bbc.com, Mikhail Poplavsky and Olga Alisova, reported that the Belgorod Metropolis denied involvement in the divine service on the Prokhorovsky field and spoke out against defining the image as an icon, since the people appearing on it were not canonized as saints. At the same time, the icon does not violate the canons of the Church, insofar as these characters are not depicted as saints - without halos, and are located under the omophorion (protection) of the Virgin. In June, Alexander Prokhanov presented the icon in the Saratov region, which again led to a negative reaction from the local Orthodox diocese.

== Club members ==
According to the club, its members include :

- Zhores Alferov
- Vladimir Bortko
- Sergey Glazyev
- Mikhail Delyagin
- Aleksandr Dugin
- Maxim Kalashnikov
- Mikhail Leontyev
- Ivan Okhlobystin
- Mikhail Khazin
- Archimandrite Tikhon
- Maksim Shevchenko
- Vladimir Ovchinsky

== Opening of a branch of the club in the DPR ==
On June 14, 2014, in Donetsk, on the territory of the self-proclaimed Donetsk People's Republic, a branch of the Izborsky Club, the Izborsky Club of Novorossiya was opened and its first meeting was held, attended by Miroslav Rudenko, Andrey Purgin, Pavel Gubarev, Dmitry Muza, Sergey Baryshnikov, Father Iona (Kovalev) and Kirill Cherkashin. The public figure of the Donetsk People's Republic, Pavel Gubarev, said that "The club will include well-known experts, doctors of science, candidates of science who will help solve the state problems of Novorossia". Donetsk historian Artyom Olkhin was elected as the executive secretary of the club. According to Gubarev, initiative to create belonged to the head of the Izborsky club, Alexander Prokhanov.
