= Medal "Defender of a Free Russia" =

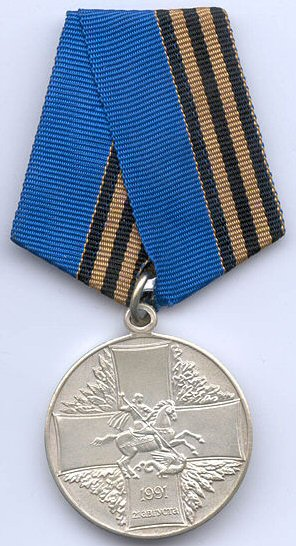
- Medal "Defender of a Free Russia" (obverse)
- Type: State decoration
- Awarded for: Courage in defending the constitutional order during the 1991 Soviet coup d'état attempt, for merit in the implementation of democratic transformation, economic and political reforms
- Presented by: Russia
- Eligibility: Russian citizens and foreign nationals
- Established: July 2, 1992
- First award: August 19, 1992
- Final award: July 25, 2006

Highlights
- Total: 1994
- Total awarded posthumously: 12
- Ribbon of the Medal "Defender of a Free Russia"

Precedence
- Next (higher): Medal of Pushkin
- Next (lower): Medal "For Distinction in the Protection of Public Order"

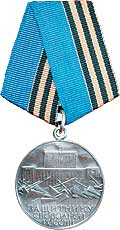
Reverse of the Medal Defender of a Free Russia

The Medal "Defender of a Free Russia" (Russian: Медаль «Защитнику свободной России») is a state award of the Russian Federation. It was created on July 2, 1992 by Law of the Russian Federation № 3183-I in the wake of the 1991 Soviet coup d'état attempt in Moscow to recognise the courage of the civil resistance members.

== Award statute ==
The Medal "Defender of a Free Russia" is awarded to citizens of the Russian Federation, foreign citizens and stateless persons for their courage in defending the constitutional order during the 1991 Soviet coup d'état attempt, for merit in the implementation of democratic transformation, economic and political reforms, the strengthening of Russian statehood, and for contributions to the solution of national problems.

The Russian Federation Order of Precedence dictates the Medal "Defender of a Free Russia" is to be worn on the left breast with other medals immediately after the Medal of Pushkin.

== Award description ==
The Medal "Defender of a Free Russia" is a 34mm in diameter circular medal made of silvered red brass. Its obverse bears a straight equilateral cross, on the cross center in relief, St George on horseback slaying the dragon. On the lower arm of the cross, the relief inscription "August 21, 1991" (Russian: "21 августа 1991 г."). Between the cross arms, multiple branches of oak and laurel protruding towards the outer circumference.

The reverse bears the image of the White House of the Soviets of Russia with the 1991 barricades. Below the image, the relief inscription on three lines "Defender of a Free Russia" (Russian: "Защитнику свободной России"). The award serial number is etched between the image of the barricades and the inscription just right of center revealing the red brass core of the medal.

The medal is suspended to a standard Russian pentagonal mount by a ring through the medal suspension loop. The mount is covered by an overlapping 24mm wide silk moiré ribbon with a blue left side and the right side in the colours of the Ribbon of Saint George.

== Award recipients (partial list) ==
1. The first medals "Defender of a Free Russia" were posthumously awarded to Dmitry Komar, Ilya Krichevsky and Vladimir Usov who died during the events of August 19–21, 1991. The musicians Konstantin Kinchev and Andrey Makarevich also received it for their participation in the "Rock on the barricades" concert. American CNN reporters Steven Hurst and Claire Shipman also received the medal for their coverage of the events.

2. Number of medals "Defender of a Free Russia" awarded to date:

1992	1993	1994	1995	1996	1997	1998	1999	2000	2001	2002	2003	2004	2005	2006	After 2006	Total
3	1,402	268	42	97	68	1	11	0	101	0	0	0	0	1	0	1,994

== See also ==
- Awards and decorations of the Russian Federation
