= Lyubov Aksyonova (MVD) =

Lyubov Nesterovna Aksyonova
- Born: 1959 (age 66–67); Kolomenka village, Krutinsky District, Omsk Oblast, Russian SFSR, USSR
- Education: Omsk State University (1985)
- Military career
- Allegiance: Russia
- Service years: 1985-2019
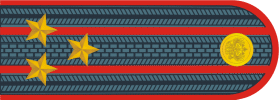
- Rank: : Police Polkóvnik
- Commands: Acting Head of the Department of the Ministry of Internal Affairs of Russia for the Omsk Region (June 2016 – December 2016)
- Known for: First woman to hold leadership positions in Omsk police
- Awards: Medal of the Order "For Merit to the Fatherland", 2nd Class; Medal "For Merit in Management Activities", 3rd Class; Medal "For Distinction in Service" and other.

Lyubov Nesterovna Aksyonova (Russian: Любовь Нестеровна Аксёнова; born 1959, Kolomenka village, Krutinsky District, Omsk oblast, Russian SFSR, USSR) is a retired official in Soviet and Russian figure in the internal affairs bodies, having held the rank of police polkóvnik. From June to December 2016, she served as the Acting Head of the Department of the Ministry of Internal Affairs for the Omsk oblast, becoming the first woman to head the regional department in the history of the post-Soviet police in Russia.

== Biography ==
Lyubov Nesterovna Aksyonova was born in 1959 in the village of Kolomenka, Krutinsky District, Omsk oblast. She is Russian by nationality.

In 1985, she graduated from the Law Faculty of Omsk State University.

From 1985, she served in the internal affairs bodies.

In July 2009, she was promoted to the position of Deputy Head of the Investigative Department, and since June 2011, she was named Acting Head of the Investigative Department of the Department of the Ministry of Internal Affairs of Russia for the Omsk oblast.

In August 2011, she was named Deputy Head of the Department of the Ministry of Internal Affairs for the Omsk oblast.

From 2016 to 2017, she temporarily served as the Acting Head of the Department of the Ministry of Internal Affairs for the Omsk oblast until the appointment of the next head, becoming the first woman to head the regional department in the history of the post-Soviet police in Russia.

Her total length of service in law enforcement agencies was more than 30 years, of which almost 20 years were in investigative positions.

In 2019, she reached the maximum age of service for employees of the Ministry of Internal Affairs in her specialization and retired.

== Awards ==
- Medal of the Order "For Merit to the Fatherland" II class.
- Medal "For Merit in Management Activities" 2nd and 3rd class.
- Medal "For Distinction in Service" of three classes.
- Medal "For Battle Commonwealth".
- Medal "For Valor in Service" (MVD)
- Badge of Distinction "Best Investigator"

== Family ==
Married, has children. She emphasized that there was little time left for home and family, and that the children were raised jointly with her husband by personal example. She devoted most of her attention to work, trying not to publicize her personal life in public sources. She adhered to the principle that "you just have to love your work" to get everything done.

== High-profile situations ==
According to publicly available sources, there is no information indicating that Lyubov Nesterovna Aksyonova was directly involved in any public scandals. Her service in the internal affairs bodies of the Omsk oblast is characterized as professional, without widely known conflicts or accusations of corruption.

During 2016–2017, when she served as the Acting Head of the Department of the Ministry of Internal Affairs for the Omsk oblast, there were reported personnel and organizational changes, as well as high-profile situations related to investigations of complex criminal cases. However, these circumstances did not turn into scandals involving her. It was also reported that information about a fight between police officers under her control was being investigated, but there were no public negative consequences on her part.
