= Jubilee Medal "90 Years of the Russian Militia" =

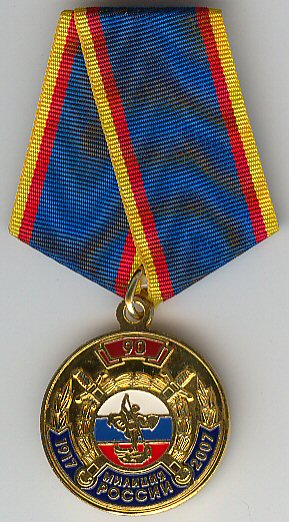
- Jubilee Medal "90 Years of the Russian Militia" (obverse)
- Type: Commemorative medal
- Presented by: Russia
- Eligibility: Citizens of the Russian Federation
- Established: 2007
- Related: Jubilee Medal "50 Years of the Soviet Militia"

The Jubilee Medal "90 Years of the Russian Militia" is a commemorative medal of the Ministry of Internal Affairs of Russia established in 2007 to commemorate the 90th anniversary of the creation of the militia (police).
