= Yuri Tomchak =

Yuri Iosifovich Tomchak
- Юрий Иосифович Томчак
- Born: December 15, 1961 (age 64); Petropavlovsk-Kamchatsky, RSFSR, Soviet Union
- Alma mater: Volgograd School of the USSR Ministry of Internal Affairs (1987); Academy of Management of the Ministry of Internal Affairs of Russia (2000)
- Military career
- Allegiance: Soviet Union → Russia
- Service: Ministry of Internal Affairs
- Service years: 1982–2016
- Rank: Lieutenant General of Police
- Commands: Head of the Department of Internal Affairs of Omsk Region (2010–2016); Acting Head of the Administration of the city of Maykop (2021–present)

Yuri Iosifovich Tomchak (Russian: Юрий Иосифович Томчак; born December 15, 1961, Petropavlovsk-Kamchatsky) is a Soviet and Russian figure in the internal affairs bodies, Lieutenant General of Police. Head of the Department of Internal Affairs (from 2011 – UMVD) of Omsk Oblast from 2010–2016. Since 2021, he has been the acting head of the administration of the city of Maykop.

== Biography ==
Yuri Iosifovich Tomchak was born on December 15, 1961, in the city of Petropavlovsk-Kamchatsky, RSFSR, USSR.

He began his service in the internal affairs bodies in 1982. In 1987, he graduated from the Volgograd School of Militia of the Ministry of Internal Affairs of the USSR, and in 2000, from the Academy of Management of the Ministry of Internal Affairs of Russia.

From 1996 to 2001, he headed the Department of Internal Affairs of the city of Maykop, then until 2003, the Department of Internal Affairs of the Maykop District. From 2003–2006, he was Deputy Minister of Internal Affairs of the Republic of Adygea. From 2006 to 2010, he headed the Ministry of Internal Affairs of the Kabardino-Balkarian Republic. From November 15, 2010, he was the head of the Department of the Ministry of Internal Affairs of Russia for Omsk Oblast.

By decree of the President of the Russian Federation of April 4, 2011, he was appointed head of the UMVD of Russia for Omsk Oblast. He holds the special rank of Lieutenant General of Police. He is known for reforms in personnel policy, the creation of public councils at the UMVD, and increased transparency of the department.

On June 2, 2016, he was dismissed from his post by decree of the President of the Russian Federation.

In March 2018, he was appointed Deputy Head of the Administration of the municipal formation "City of Maykop." He oversaw interaction with political parties, public associations, civil defense and emergency situations, as well as the management of special programs and the Unified Duty Dispatch Service.

Since December 2021, he has been serving as the acting head of the administration of the city of Maykop — after the detention and resignation of the previous mayor.

== Awards ==
- Departmental and state-level awards.
- Medal “100 Years of the Personnel Service of the Ministry of Internal Affairs of Russia”. .

== Incidents and public controversies ==
During Tomchak's leadership in Omsk, a number of incidents occurred involving his circle:

Dismissals for misconduct and criminal cases initiated against subordinates, including the bribery case against Colonel Sergei Klevakin. In July 2015, he was detained for receiving 4 million ₽ as a result of a scheme involving the acquisition of official housing, but in March 2016, the court acquitted him. However, three months later, the acquittal was overturned by a decision of the prosecutor's office, and then the regional court reduced the sentence to 2.5 years under the article on abuse of power.

The media reported on complaints from entrepreneurs about corruption and raiding among UMVD employees, but there were no direct accusations against Tomchak himself.

According to local press and business community feedback, his reputation remained generally positive. He maintained cooperative relations with regional authorities and business representatives, while pursuing structural reforms and promoting increased departmental openness.
