= Viktor Kamertsel =

City of Yermak, Pavlodar Region, Kazakh SSR, USSR

Viktor Yakovlevich Kamertsel
- Born: November 4, 1951; Yermak, Pavlodar Oblast, Kazakh SSR, USSR
- Alma mater: Kazakh State University (1982)
- Military career
- Allegiance: Soviet Union → Russia
- Service years: 1972–2012
- Rank: Major General
- Commands: Head of the Department of Internal Affairs of the Omsk Region (1998-2010); Assistant to the Minister of Internal Affairs of the Russian Federation (2010-2012)
- Awards: Order of Honour; Medal of the Ministry of Internal Affairs of Russia "For Valor in Service"

Viktor Yakovlevich Kamertsel (Russian: Камерцель Виктор Яковлевич; born November 4, 1951, city of Yermak, Pavlodar Region, Kazakh SSR, USSR) is a Soviet and Russian figure in the internal affairs bodies, Major General of Police, a specialist in the field of ensuring public order and combating crime. Head of the Department of Internal Affairs of Omsk Oblast from 1998–2010. In 2010–2012, he was an assistant to the Minister of Internal Affairs of the Russian Federation.

== Biography ==
Viktor Yakovlevich Kamertsel was born on November 4, 1951, in the city of Yermak, Pavlodar Oblast, Kazakh SSR, in the Soviet Union.

After graduating from school, he joined the internal affairs service. During his service, he progressed through various operational, service, and leadership positions. He distinguished himself through a high level of professional training and organizational skills.

In 1998, he was appointed head of the Department of Internal Affairs of Omsk Oblast, where he remained until 2010. Under his leadership, the department strengthened the system of protecting public order and combating crime, and modern methods of police management and violation prevention were implemented.

In February 2010, he was appointed assistant to the Minister of Internal Affairs of the Russian Federation, where he oversaw personnel and organizational matters until 2012. In this role, he contributed to the reform of the MVD and the implementation of personnel policy at the federal level.

In 2011, he was awarded the special rank of "Major General of Police".

In 2012, he was dismissed from public service. Over the years, he proved to be a competent manager with a significant contribution to the development of the law enforcement system in Omsk Oblast and at the federal level.

== Awards and achievements ==
- Order of Honour
- Medal "For Valor in Service" (MVD)

== Family ==
Married, has a son, a daughter, and a grandson.

== Controversies ==
Against the backdrop of intra-regional confrontation between leaders of various structures, parties, and clans, contradictory information has been repeatedly published in the press, attributing to Kamertsel the status of a shadow mayor of the city of Omsk and involvement in corruption schemes, but this information has not been officially confirmed.
