= Order "For Valiant Labor" =

- Type: Order
- Presented by: Russia (2024–present)
- Eligibility: Citizens of Russia
- Status: Being awarded
- Established: 1 February 2024
- First award: 2 February 2024

Highlights
- Total: 10
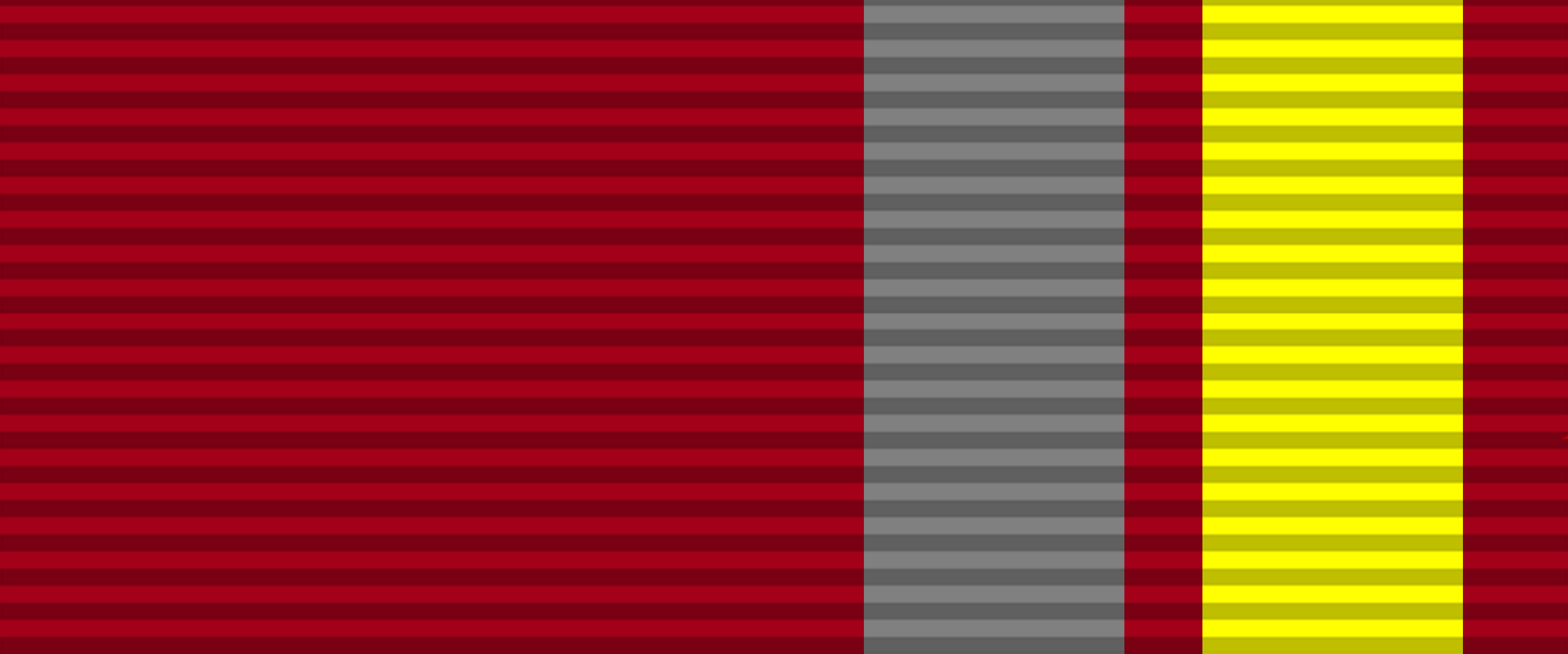
- Ribbon of the Order "For Valiant Labor"

Precedence
- Next (higher): Order of Gagarin
- Next (lower): Order of Alexander Nevsky

Order "For Valiant Labor" (Russian: Орден «За доблестный труд») is a state award of the Russian Federation. Established by Decree of the President of Russia issued on February 1, 2024, No. 81 "On the establishment of the Order "For Valiant Labor"".

== Regulation and criteria ==
According to the statute approved by Decree of the President of the Russian Federation of February 1, 2024 No. 81, the Order “For Valiant Labor” is awarded to Russian citizens:

for great achievements in labor (service) activities aimed at strengthening and developing the economic and defense potential of the Russian Federation; for highly productive work at enterprises, organizations and institutions, contributing to increasing the competitiveness of sectors of the Russian economy, as well as various types of products; for great achievements in the field of state construction, scientific and technological development of the Russian Federation and for the effective solution of socially significant problems. Citizens of the Russian Federation can be awarded the Order “For Valorous Labor”, as a rule, provided that they were previously awarded another state award.

In addition, the Order “For Valiant Labor” can be awarded to teams of enterprises, organizations and institutions, regardless of their form of ownership, for outstanding services in strengthening and developing the economic, scientific and defense potential of the Russian Federation.

== Gallery ==
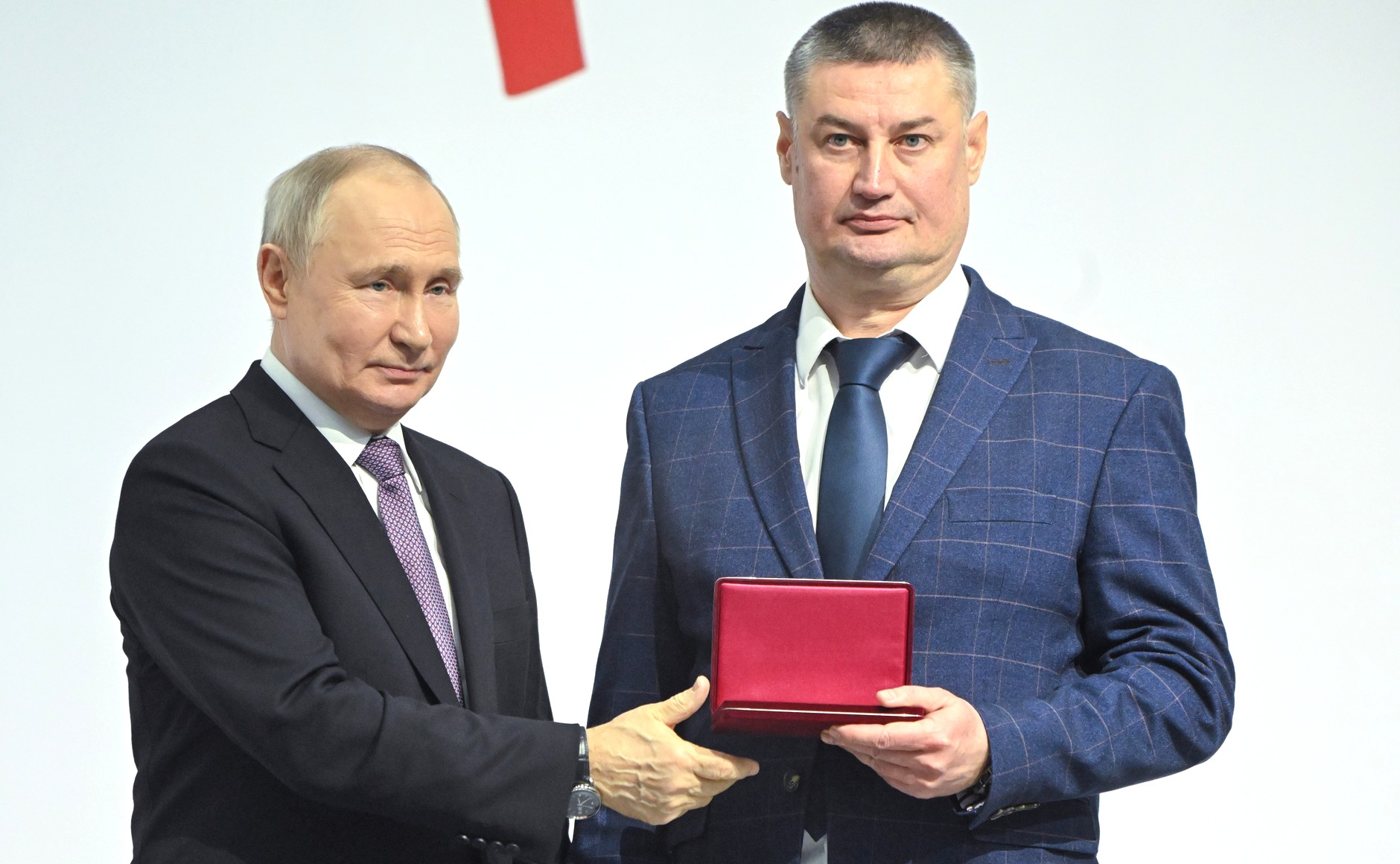
Vladimir Putin awarded NPO Splav on 2 February 2024

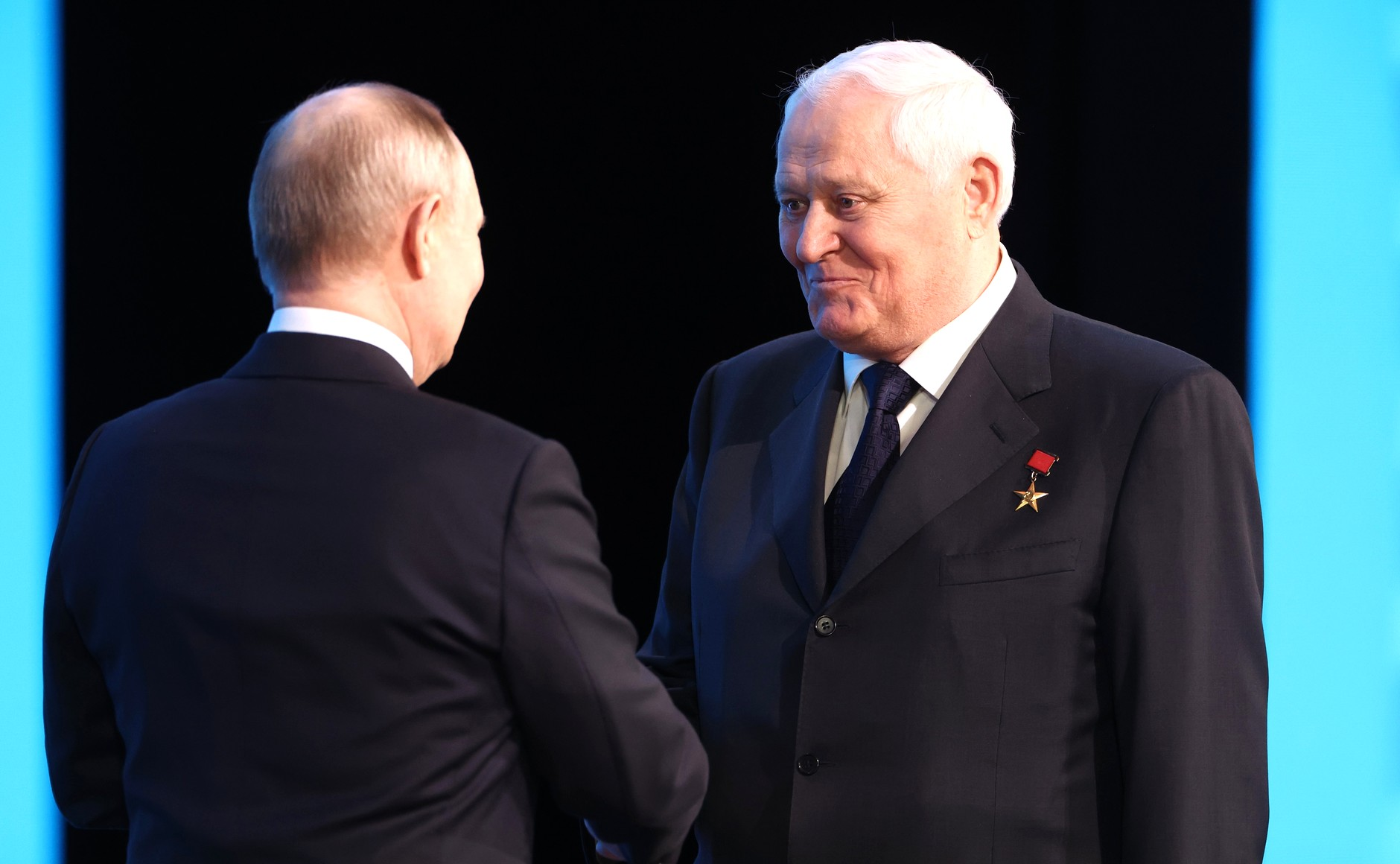
Grigory Kogatko

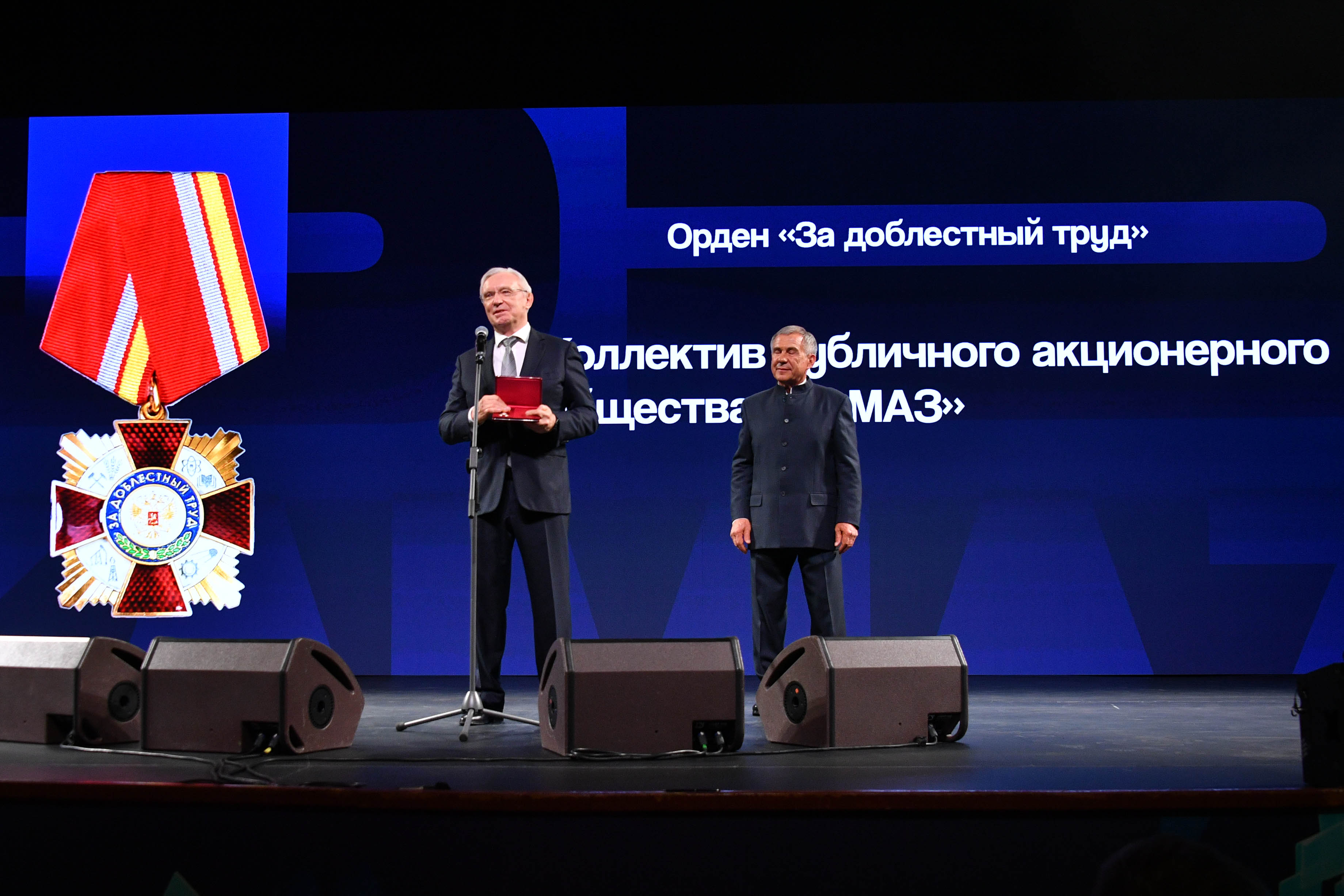
KamAZ on 13 December 2024

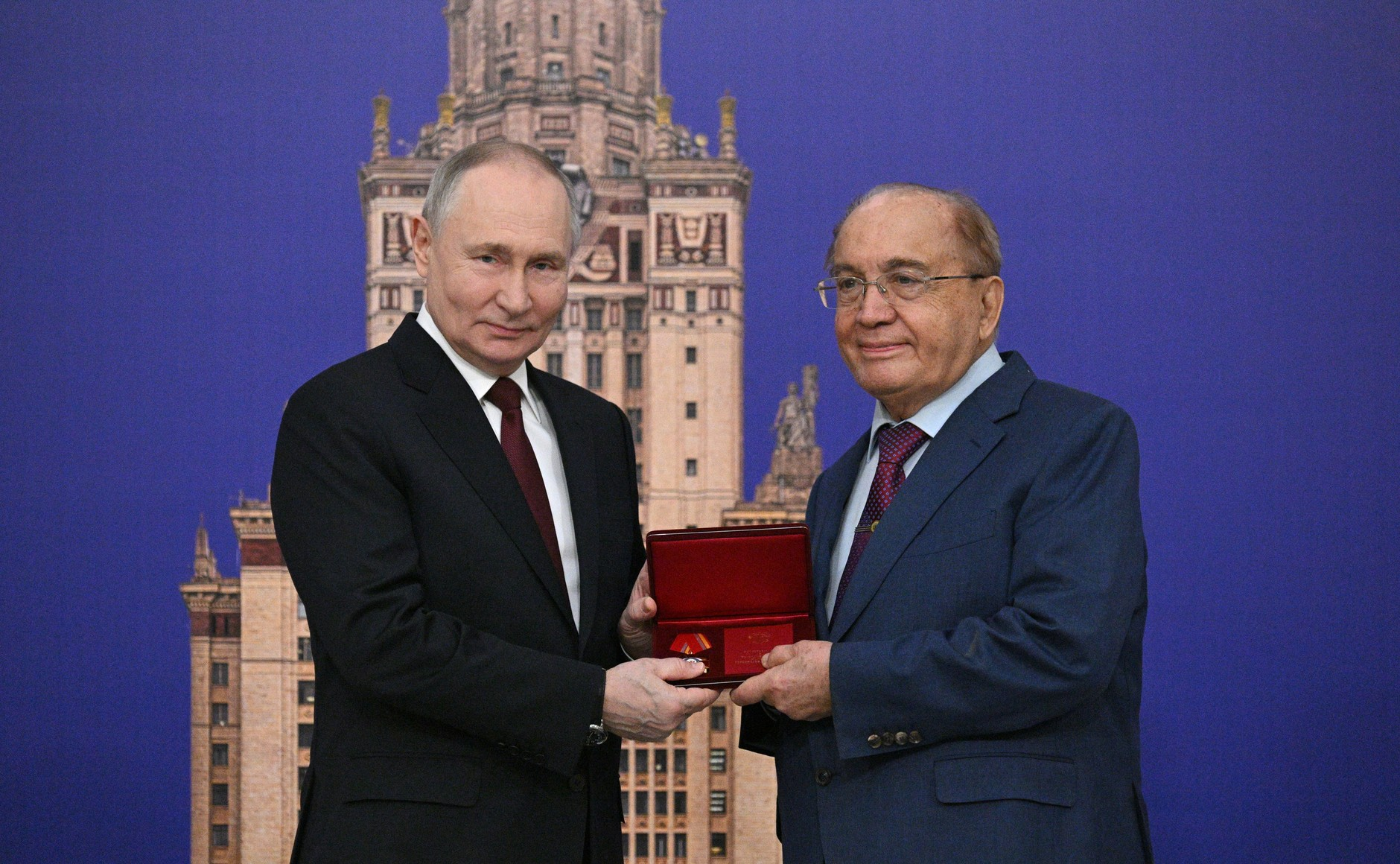
Moscow State University

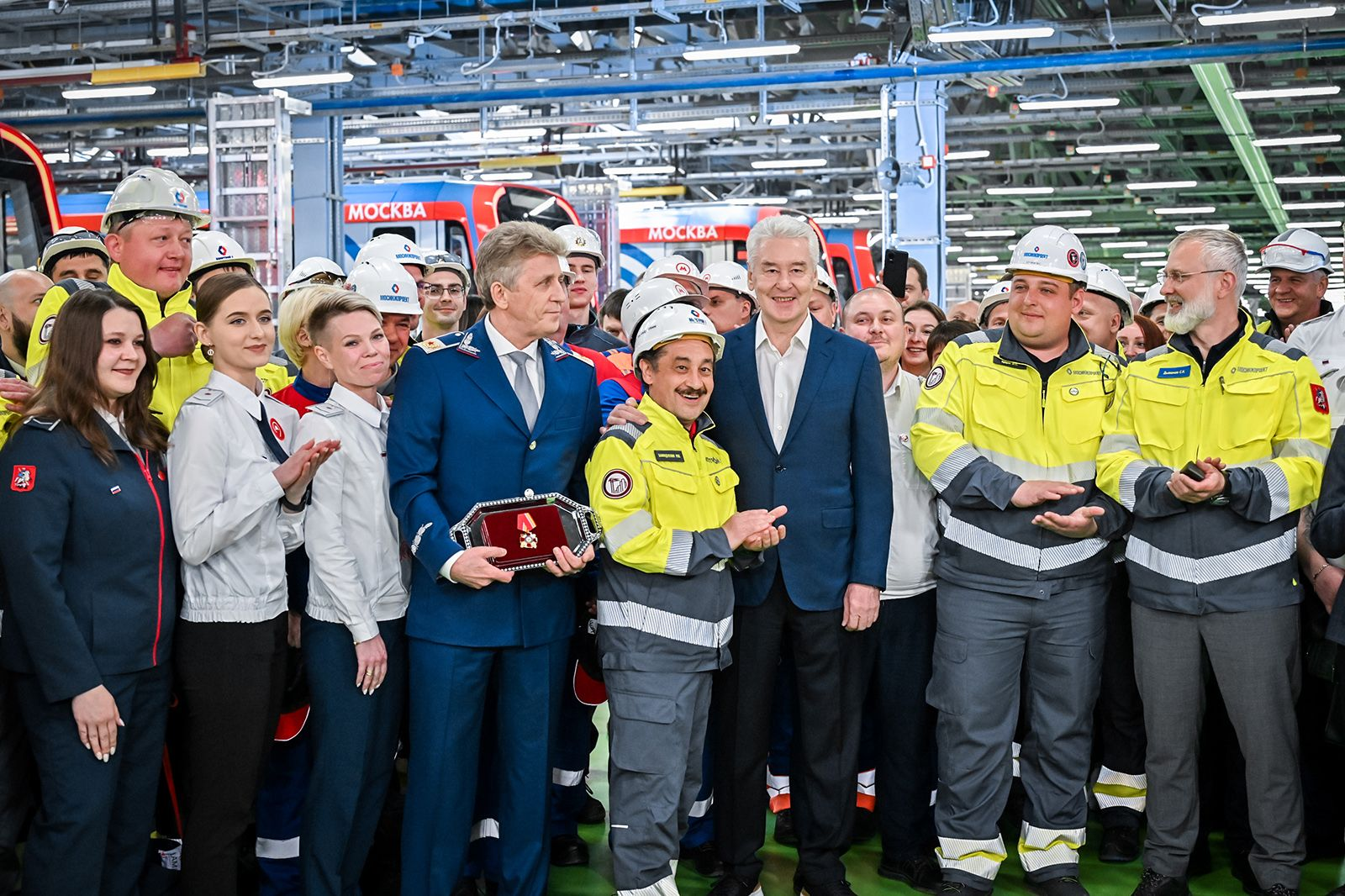
Moscow Metro

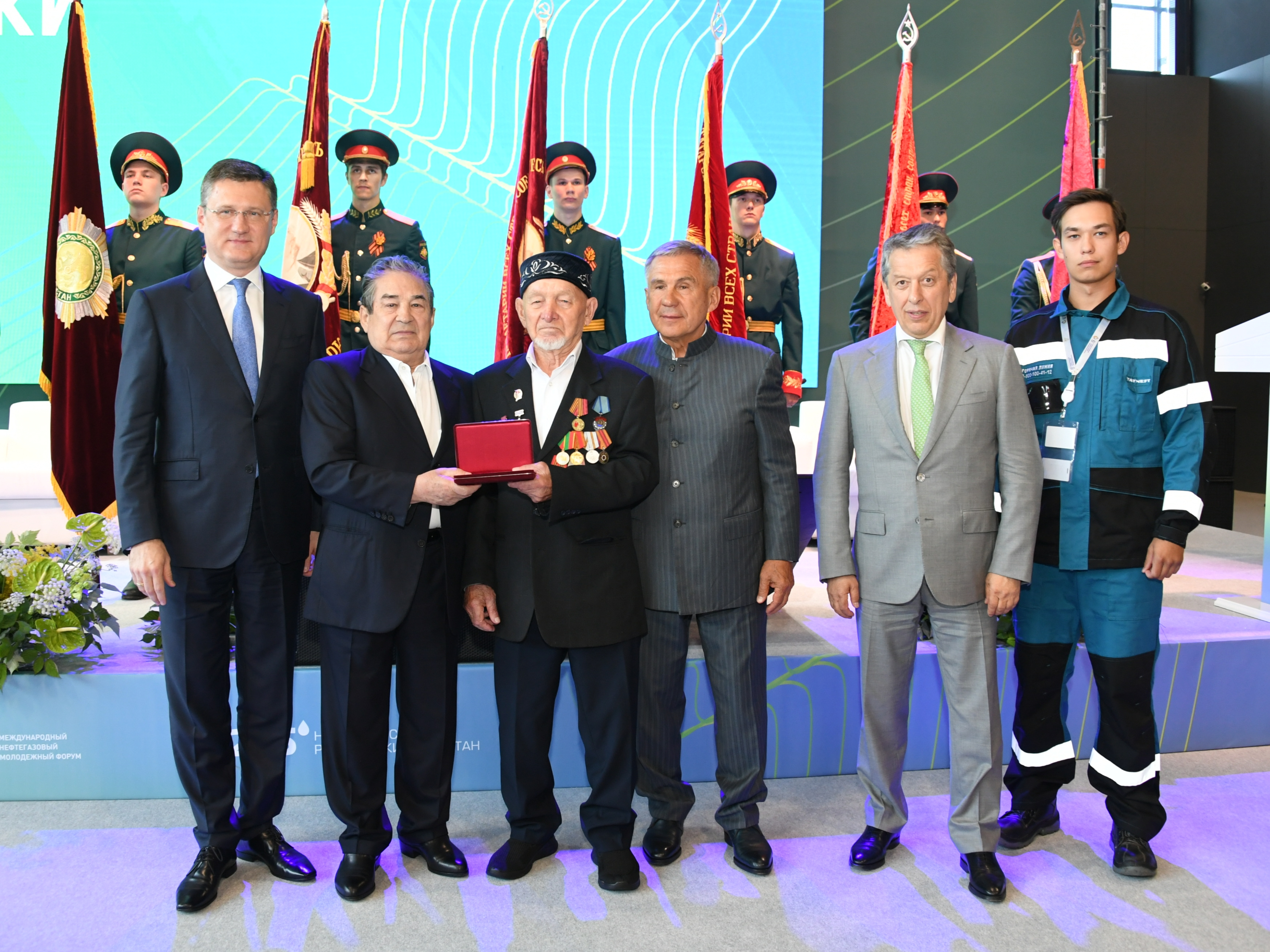
Tatneft

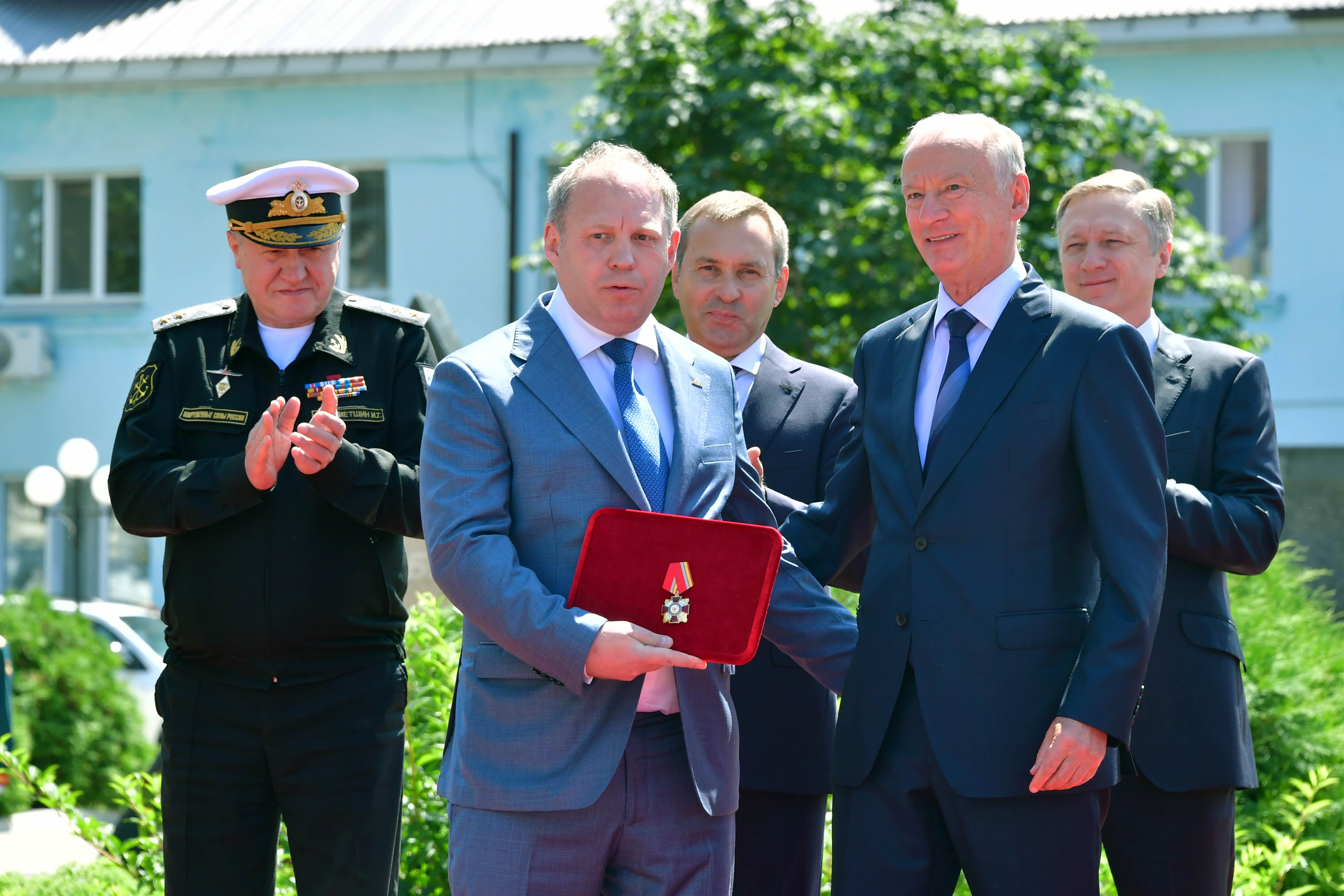
16 July 2025

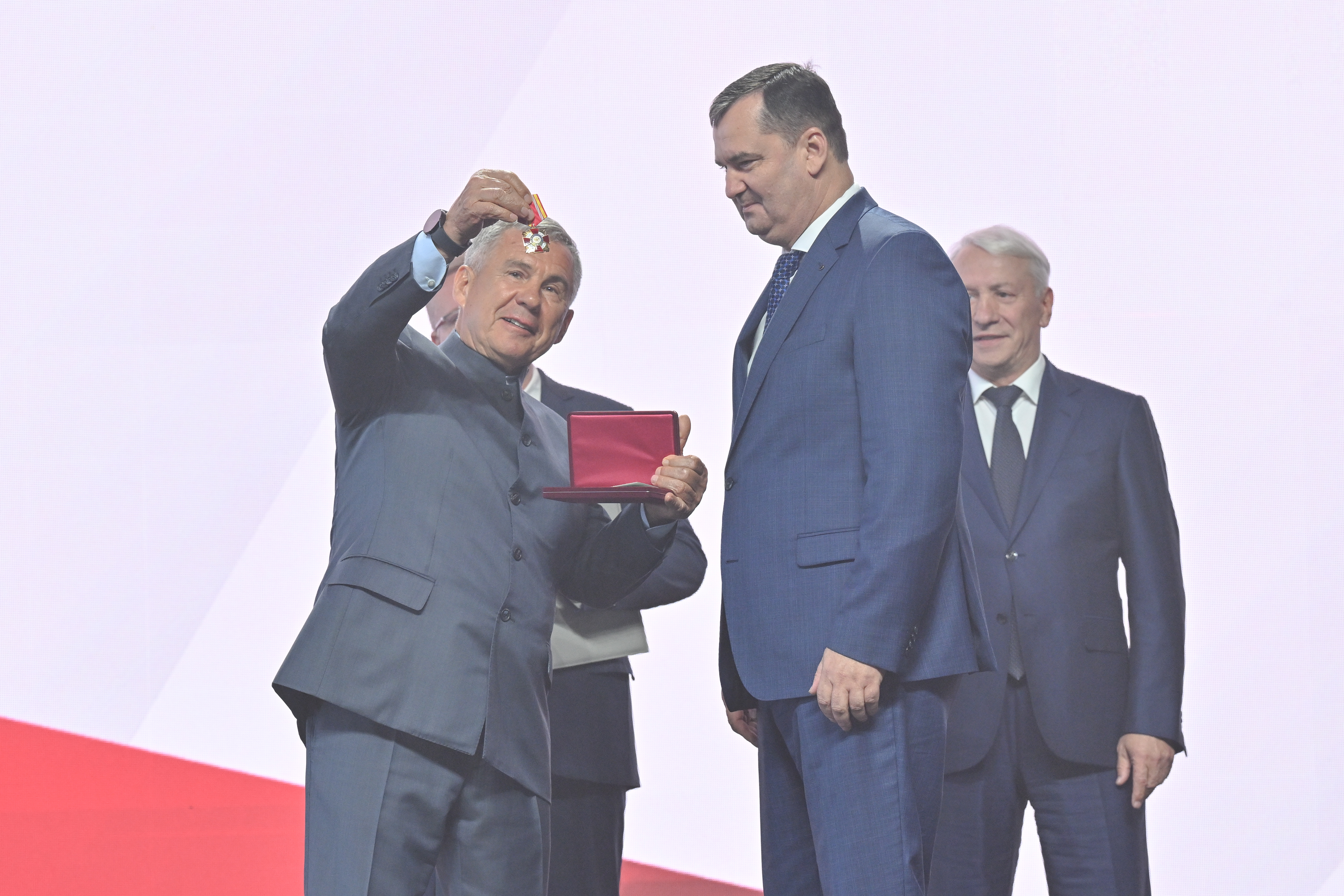
Kazan Helicopters
