= Moscow Oblast Police =

Regional police force in Russia

Главное управление внутренних дел по Московской области Moscow Oblast Police
- official logo
- Abbreviation: ГУВД по Московской области
- Motto: служа закону, Служим народу by serving the law, we serve the people

Agency overview
- Formed: 1956
- Employees: 7,000

Jurisdictional structure
- Operations jurisdiction: Russia
- General nature: Local civilian police

Operational structure
- Headquarters: Moscow
- Agency executive: Nikolai Golovkin, Chief of Police
- Parent agency: MVD
- Units: List: Criminal Investigative Department; Federal Migatory Service; Traffic Police; OMON Special Force; Air Division

Website
- Official Site

Main Directorate for Moscow Oblast (Главное управление внутренних дел по Московской области) is the official name of the Moscow Oblast's Police. Subordinated directly to the Russian Interior Ministry and the Governor of Moscow Oblast.

The Main Headquarters is in Belinsky street, 3 (now Nikita Lane, 3) in Moscow.

== History ==
Until 1956, Moscow and Moscow region were united in the structural division of the NKVD under the USSR Ministry of Internal Affairs. In 1956, the Minister of Internal Affairs Nikolai Dudorov decided to improve the regional management and on May 9, 1956 he signed an internal decree No. 071, which was formed two independent department: The Department of Internal Affairs of Moscow with its center at Petrovka 38, and the Moscow region police department with a focus on Belinsky street, 3 (now Nikita Lane, 3).

The first chief of the Moscow region police department became Commissioner Yegorov Ryasno. On July 5, 1956, he was dismissed from the Ministry of Internal Affairs of the USSR on the facts of defamation. Instead of him, was appointed Commissioner Grigory Ivanovich Kalinin, who led the department until 1959.

During the next 10 years (1959–1969) the Department of Internal Affairs of the Moscow Region was led by Commissioner Sergey A. Vasiliev. Next up in 1984 to the post of head of department was appointed Lieutenant-General Vasily Konstantinovich Tsepkov, who previously worked as head of the department of administrative organs of the CPSU. Under him, in 1978 (Order of the Ministry of the Interior March 10, 1978 No. 0122) was reorganized Department of Internal Affairs of the Moscow region to the main Department of Internal Affairs of the Moscow region (in order to raise the profile and the increasing number of officers). Under his leadership, was opened a museum of history of Moscow region police, and began to build a training corps training school junior and middle commanding structure, which opened in 1975 (now a training center in the village Rastorguevo, in Leninsky Municipal District of Moscow Oblast).

After retiring, Tsepkova was replaced by Ivan Shilov, police chief who has worked in the Moscow Region 1984–1988 years, previously worked at the central office of MVD. From 1988 to 1994 he headed the Directorate alongside former chief of Egoryevskaya police, Lieutenant-General Constantine Maksimovich Bellin. From 1994 to 1995 he was succeeded by Lieutenant-General Vyacheslav V. Ogorodnikov, who previously worked in Istra, Naro-Fominsk, and fought in Afghanistan.

From 1995 to 1999, the head of the Moscow region police department was a former deputy Minister of Internal Affairs, Colonel-General Alexander Kulikov. Next up in 2001 the police department was led by Major General Yuri Ivanovich Yukhman.

From 2001 the head of Moscow region police is the colonel-general Nikolai V. Golovkin.

== See also ==
- Moscow Police
