= Awards of the Ministry of Internal Affairs of Russia =

Known internationally as the MVD, The Ministry of Internal Affairs of The Russian Federation encompasses all militia (police) forces, Interior Troops and the State Migration Service. It has its own ministerial awards system subordinate to state awards. This article will endeavour to give as complete a picture as possible on the awards of this Russian ministry.

== Ministry of Internal Affairs ==
=== Medals ===
Award	Name (English/Russian)	Order	Inception Date	Award Criteria
	Medal "For Valour In Service" Медаль «За Доблесть В Службе»	No. 50 - No. 989 - No. 602 - No. 220	2001-01-24 --- 2012-10-31 --- 2013-08-06 --- 2017-04-20	Awarded to members of the organs of the Interior Ministry of the Russian Federation for excellent operational performance of duties; for active work in the protection of public order and combating crime; for courage, dedication and achievements displayed during service in the Interior Ministry.
	Medal "I.D. Putilin" Медаль «И.Д. Путилина»	No. 220	2017-04-20	Awarded to employees of bodies of internal affairs for special services in the organization and implementation of operational and investigative activities, for a significant contribution to the fight against criminality and the detection of crimes, for scientific and technical support and the training of qualified personnel for the operational divisions of bodies of internal affairs.
	Medal "For Explosives Disposal" Медаль «За разминирование»	No. 466 - No. 989 - No. 602 - No. 220	2005-06-11 --- 2012-10-31 --- 2013-08-06 --- 2017-04-20	Awarded to employees of law enforcement bodies and servicemen internal troops for dedication, bravery and courage in detecting and neutralising (destroying) explosive devices on the ground; for organising and managing activities aimed at detecting and neutralizing explosive devices on the ground. In some cases awarded to citizens for assisting employees of the Ministry of the Interior of the Russian Federation or the military forces of the Interior Ministry in carrying out their tasks to detect and neutralize explosive devices on the ground.
	Medal "For Courage During a Rescue" Медаль «За смелость во имя спасения»	No. 989 - No. 220	2012-10-31 --- 2017-04-20	Awarded to police officers, to soldiers of Interior Troops of Russia, to federal civil servants and employees of the Interior Ministry of Russia for displaying courage, dedication and selflessness in rescuing people during natural disasters, on water, underground, when fighting fires or in other circumstances.
	Medal "For Merit in Service in Special Circumstances" Медаль «За заслуги в службе в особых условиях»	No. 989 - No. 220	2012-10-31 --- 2017-04-20	Awarded to employees of the Ministry of Internal Affairs of the Russian Federation, servicemen of Internal Troops of Russia, federal civil servants, employees of the Interior Ministry of Russia already awarded the Decoration "For Distinguished Service in Special Circumstances", for high performance in service and diligence in the performance of tasks during a period of martial law, a state emergency, an anti-terrorist operation, in the context of an armed conflict, in the aftermath of accidents, natural or man-made disasters or other emergencies.
	Medal "For Military Cooperation" Медаль «За Боевое Содружество»	No. 50 - No. 989 - No. 602 - No. 220	2001-01-24 --- 2012-10-31 --- 2013-08-06 --- 2017-04-20	Awarded to members of the Ministry of the Interior of the Russian Federation, the military forces of the Interior Ministry of Russia for services in strengthening the Brotherhood of Arms and military cooperation, and in some cases to other citizens of the Russian Federation or foreign citizens for assisting in the performance of the tasks assigned to the ministry.
	Medal "For Labour Valour" Медаль «За трудовую доблесть»	No. 989 - No. 220	2012-10-31 --- 2017-04-20	Awarded to federal civil servants and employees of the Interior Ministry of Russia for many years of fruitful work, achievements in performing duties, high work quality, the successful implementation of tasks entrusted to bodies of internal affairs or internal troops of Russia, for contribution to the improvement of activities.
	Medal "For Impeccable Service in the MVD" Медаль «За безупречную службу в МВД»	No. 989 - No. 220	2012-10-31 --- 2017-04-20	Awarded to police officers and servicemen of Internal Troops of Russia, with length of service of 20 years or more and previously awarded departmental distinctions of the Interior Ministry of Russia, for excellent service and significant contribution to the development and improvement of the Russian Interior Ministry.
	Medal "For Merit in Scientific and Educational Activities" Медаль «За заслуги в научной и педагогической деятельности»	No. 220 - No. 591	2017-04-20 --- 2019-09-02	Awarded to employees of bodies of internal affairs, federal state civil servants, employees of the Ministry of Internal Affairs of Russia and to other persons who have achieved high results in scientific work in the interests of strengthening the rule of law and the rule of law, who have made a significant contribution to training qualified personnel for internal affairs bodies.
	Medal "For strengthening international police cooperation" Медаль «За укрепление международного полицейского сотрудничества»	No. 220 - No. 591	2017-04-20 --- 2019-09-02	Awarded to employees of law enforcement agencies, federal state civil servants, employees of the Ministry of Internal Affairs of Russia and, in some cases other persons, for significant contribution to strengthening and developing cooperation with law enforcement agencies of foreign states and International organizations, for merit in scientific and pedagogical activities.
	Medal "For Distinction In Service" 1st Class Медаль «За Отличие В Службе» I степени	No. 641 - No. 140 - No. 989 - No. 602 - No. 220	2002-07-05 --- 2007-02-07 --- 2012-10-31 --- 2013-08-06 --- 2017-04-20	Awarded to police officers of the Ministry of the Interior of the Russian Federation and servicemen of Interior Troops, with no previous disciplinary actions for 20 years of good service.
	Medal "For Distinction In Service" 2nd Class Медаль «За Отличие В Службе» II степени	No. 641 - No. 140 - No. 989 - No. 602 - No. 220	2002-07-05 --- 2007-02-07 --- 2012-10-31 --- 2013-08-06 --- 2017-04-20	Awarded to police officers of the Ministry of the Interior of the Russian Federation and servicemen of Interior Troops, with no previous disciplinary actions for 15 years of good service.
	Medal "For Distinction In Service" 3rd Class Медаль «За Отличие В Службе» III степени	No. 641 - No. 140 - No. 989 - No. 602 - No. 220	2002-07-05 --- 2007-02-07 --- 2012-10-31 --- 2013-08-06 --- 2017-04-20	Awarded to police officers of the Ministry of the Interior of the Russian Federation and servicemen of Interior Troops, with no previous disciplinary actions for 10 years of good service.
	Medal "For Contribution to Strengthening the Rule of Law" Медаль «За вклад в укрепление правопорядка»	No. 989 - No. 220 - No. 591	2012-10-31 --- 2017-04-20 --- 2019-09-02	Awarded to federal state civil servants, employees of organs of the ministry of Internal affairs of Russia and to citizens of the Russian Federation and other persons for their significant contribution to strengthening the rule of law, improving the legal regulations of bodies of internal affairs, for the training of qualified personnel for the bodies of internal affairs, for assisting law enforcement bodies of the Russian Federation in the discharge of their duties.
	Jubilee medal "100 years of international police cooperation" Юбилейная медаль «100 лет международному полицейскому сотрудничесву»	No. 150	2014-03-14	Awarded to federal civil servants, employees of the National Central Bureau of Interpol of the Ministry of Internal Affairs of the Russian Federation, employees of the Legal and Treaties Department of the Ministry of Internal Affairs of the Russian Federation, employees of Interpol territorial departments (divisions, groups) of the Russian Interior Ministry at the regional level, for professional excellence and achievements in operational performance; to employees of law-enforcement bodies of the Russian Federation, of other government agencies and organizations, as well as to veterans of the police, who made a significant contribution to the development of international police cooperation and the fight against international crime; to Russian citizens and foreign nationals for significant assistance to law enforcement bodies in the fight against international crime and the development of international police cooperation.
	Jubilee medal "300 years of the Russian Police" Юбилейная медаль «300 лет российской полиции»	No. 123	2018-03-05	Awarded during the period 2018 - 2020: to the rank-and-file and command staff of bodies of Internal Affairs of the Russian Federation with serving experience (long service) in bodies of the Ministry of Internal Affairs of the Russian Federation of 20 years or more, who have achieved high results in operational activities, who have performed their official duties in an exemplary manner; to federal state civil servants and employees of the Ministry of Internal Affairs of the Russian Federation with serving experience (long service) in the state civil service of the bodies of the Ministry of Internal Affairs of the Russian Federation of 20 years or more, who have made a significant contribution to the fulfillment of tasks assigned to the Ministry of Internal Affairs of the Russian Federation and who have achieved high merit in the performance of labour duties; to citizens of the Russian Federation, veterans of service in internal affairs bodies and who served in internal affairs bodies for 20 years or more (with the exception of persons dismissed from internal affairs bodies on the grounds specified in paragraph 8 of Article 3 of the Federal Law No. 247 of July 19, 2011) who continue to assist in the implementation of the objectives of the Ministry of Internal Affairs of the Russian Federation; to other citizens of the Russian Federation and other persons by decision of the Minister of Internal Affairs of the Russian Federation, who contributed to the strengthening of the rule of law, in improving the legal regulations of the activities of internal affairs agencies, training qualified personnel for internal affairs agencies, or in assisting internal affairs agencies in carrying out the tasks assigned to them.

=== Decorations ===
Award	Name (English/Russian)	Order	Inception Date	Award Criteria
	"Prize of the MVD of Russia in the field of literature and the arts and in the field of science and technology" «Премия МВД России в области литературы и искусства и в области науки и техники»	No. 666 - No. 1223	2003-08-21 --- 2011-12-12	Awarded to officers, civil servants and employees of the organs of the Ministry of Internal Affairs of Russia, and to other citizens of the Russian Federation and foreign nationals, for significant contribution in assisting and supporting bodies of the Interior Ministry of Russia in the fight against crime, for the active promotion and enhancement of the prestige of service in law-enforcement bodies; for active cooperation with the Ministry of Internal Affairs of the Russian Federation in the framework of international programs to combat crime; for the most talented scientific work and work in literature and the arts that have received public recognition and made a significant contribution in solving the tasks entrusted to the Ministry of Internal Affairs of the Russian Federation. Can be awarded individually or as part of organizations, associations, or art groups.
	Breast badge "Honoured Fellow of the MVD" Нагрудный знак «Почетный сотрудник МВД»	No. 772 - No. 989 - No. 602 - No. 220 - No. 591	1998-11-07 --- 2012-10-31 --- 2013-08-06 --- 2017-04-20 --- 2019-09-02	Awarded to employees of bodies of Internal Affairs and servicemen of Internal Troops who have served in the Ministry of Internal Affairs of Russia for 15 years or more, for efficient work organisation and high performance indicators while serving in internal affairs agencies, formations and units of internal troops, for exemplary performance in service in carrying out military duties and for displaying initiative, courage and dedication.
	Breast badge "For Distinguished Service in Special Circumstances" Нагрудный знак «За отличие в службе в особых условиях»	No. 989 - No. 220 - No. 591	2012-10-31 --- 2017-04-20 --- 2019-09-02	Awarded to employees of law enforcement bodies of the Russian Federation, to federal civil servants, to employees of the Interior Ministry of Russia, for high performance in service and diligence in the performance of tasks during a period of martial law, a state emergency, an anti-terrorist operation, in the context of an armed conflict, in the aftermath of accidents, natural or man-made disasters or other emergencies.
	Breast badge "For Excellent Service in the MVD" 1st class Нагрудный знак «За отличную службу в МВД» I степени	No. 989 - No. 220	2012-10-31 --- 2017-04-20	Awarded to employees of law enforcement bodies of the Russian Interior Ministry with at least 10 years of continuous service in one of the bodies of the Interior Ministry and already awarded the decoration 2nd class, for courage and selflessness demonstrated in the line of duty, for achieving high results in personal performance, for marked improvement of professional skills, for the development and introduction of new working methods to improve the efficiency of MVD bodies.
	Breast badge "For Excellent Service in the MVD" 2nd class Нагрудный знак «За отличную службу в МВД» II степени	No. 989 - No. 220	2012-10-31 --- 2017-04-20	Awarded to employees of law enforcement bodies of the Russian Interior Ministry with at least 5 years of continuous service in one of the bodies of the Interior Ministry, for courage and selflessness demonstrated in the line of duty, for achieving high results in personal performance, for marked improvement of professional skills, for the development and introduction of new working methods to improve the efficiency of MVD bodies.
	Breast badge "Excellent Police" Нагрудный знак «Отличник полиции»	No. 989 - No. 220	2012-10-31 --- 2017-04-20	Awarded to police officers who are assigned special ranks, privates and junior officers of internal affairs law enforcement bodies who have served in the police force for at least 2 years, for the highest service ratings.
	Breast badge "For the Promotion of the MVD" Нагрудный знак «За Содействие МВД»	No. 633 - No. 989 - No. 602 - No. 220	2000-06-14 --- 2012-10-31 --- 2013-08-06 --- 2017-04-20	Awarded to citizens of Russia and other friendly countries for assistance in the implementation of specific activities for the Ministry of Internal Affairs of Russia.
	Breast badge "Participant in Combat Operations" Нагрудный знак «Участник боевых действий»	No. 333 - No. 989 - No. 602 - No. 220	2000-03-31 --- 2012-10-31 --- 2013-08-06 --- 2017-04-20	Awarded to servicemen and officers of the Interior Troops of Russia, for faithful execution of combat duties and fighting for the rule of law, combating crime and terrorism, conducting counter-terrorism operations in the North Caucasus region; to members of the bodies of Internal Affairs and internal security forces, other employees of the MVD, for taking part in law enforcement activities and public safety in combat areas.
	Commemorative Jubilee breast badge "300 years of the Russian Police" Памятного юбилейный нагрудный знак «300 лет российской полиции»	No. 123 - No. 220	2018-03-05 --- 2018-04-18	Awarded during the 2018-2020 period: to individuals of the rank and file and command staff of internal affairs bodies of the Russian Federation who have served (long service) in bodies of the Ministry of Internal Affairs of Russia for 10 years or more and who have achieved high results in operational activities, who exceptional performance and exemplary duty, as well as to employees who have shown courage, valour and bravery not associated to any length or service.
	"Certificate of Honour of the Interior Ministry of the Russian Federation" «Почётная грамота Министерства внутренних дел Российской Федерации»	No. 77	2014-02-05	Awarded to employees of the Interior Ministry of the Russian Federation for high rates in official operational duties, for personal initiative and exemplary courage and dedication shown in the performance of official duties as well as for a long and impeccable service in the organs of internal affairs; to federal state civil servants, employees of the Ministry of Internal Affairs of Russia, for long and impeccable service (work), exemplary performance of official (labor) duties and high quality of work; to other persons not previously specified for active assistance to bodies of internal affairs of Russia in the performance of the operational, service and combat missions assigned to them, for the education of personnel and the enhancement of the prestige of bodies of internal affairs of Russia; to units of the divisions of the central apparatus of the Ministry of Internal Affairs of Russia, territorial bodies of the Ministry of the Interior of Russia, educational, scientific, medical and sanatorium-and-spa organizations of the Ministry of Internal Affairs of Russia, district logistics departments of the Ministry of Internal Affairs of Russia, formations, military units, as well as other organizations and units established to perform tasks and exercise authority entrusted to the Ministry of Internal Affairs of Russia, for high performance in operational service, combat service, production and economic activities, training and education of personnel; to collectives, organizations and institutions not previously mentioned for support and assistance to bodies of internal affairs of Russia in ensuring law and order, public security and combating crime, as well as for work in professional, moral and cultural-aesthetic education of personnel, for increasing the prestige of bodies of internal affairs of Russia.
	"Certificate of Gratitude of the Minister (Deputy Minister) of the Interior of the Russian Federation" «Благодарность Министра (заместителей Министра) внутренних дел Российской Федерации»	No. 77	2014-02-05	Awarded to employees of the Interior Ministry of the Russian Federation for distinction in official operational duties and for personal initiative displayed in the performance of official duties; to federal state civil servants, employees of the Ministry of Internal Affairs of Russia, for conscientious attitude to official duties; to other persons not previously specified for active assistance to bodies of internal affairs of Russia in the performance of the operational, for the education of personnel and the enhancement of the prestige of bodies of internal affairs of Russia; to units of the divisions of the central apparatus of the Ministry of Internal Affairs of Russia, territorial bodies of the Ministry of the Interior of Russia, educational, scientific, medical and sanatorium-and-spa organizations of the Ministry of Internal Affairs of Russia, district logistics departments of the Ministry of Internal Affairs of Russia, formations, military units, as well as other organizations and units established to perform tasks and exercise authority entrusted to the Ministry of Internal Affairs of Russia, for high performance in operational, official, production and economic activities, training and education of personnel; to collectives, organizations and institutions not previously mentioned for support and assistance to bodies of internal affairs of Russia in ensuring law and order, public security and combating crime, as well as for work in professional, moral and cultural-aesthetic education of personnel, for increasing the prestige of bodies of internal affairs of Russia.

=== Abrogated medals ===
Award	Name (English/Russian)	Order	Order Date	Award Criteria
	Medal "For Military Valour" Медаль «За Воинскую Доблесть»	No. 50 - No. 989 - No. 602	2001-01-24 --- 2012-10-31 --- 2013-08-06	Awarded to military personnel of the troops of the Interior Ministry of the Russian Federation for excellent performance in training; for distinction in the performance of military duties; for merit in the protection of public order and public security; for courage, dedication and high achievements displayed during military service. Abrogated from the MVD awards system by order 602 of October 2013, it is no longer awarded.
	Medal "For Merit in the Activities of Special Units" Медаль «За заслуги в деятельности специальных подразделений»	No. 623 - No. 602	2010-08-27 --- 2013-08-06	Awarded to police officers and soldiers of Interior Troops of the Ministry of Internal Affairs of the Russian Federation for professional excellence, courage and determination, initiative and bold and decisive actions displayed in operational service and (or) combat service during activities in special police units or with special forces of Internal Troops of the Russian Federation, in special forces or intelligence units. In exceptional cases, the medal may also be awarded to other citizens for aid and assistance to special units of the Interior Ministry. Abrogated from the MVD awards system by order 602 of October 2013, it is no longer awarded.
	Medal "For Bravery in a Fire" Медаль «За Отвагу На Пожаре»	No. 50 - No. 602	2001-01-24 --- 2013-08-06	Awarded to members of the Interior Ministry, the military forces of the Interior Ministry of Russia, employees of the State Fire Service and in some cases to other citizens of the Russian Federation for courage and dedication while extinguishing fires, rescuing people and saving property from fire; for leadership in leading efforts in fire fighting and rescuing people; for courage, determination and high professionalism as demonstrated in preventing an explosion or fire. Abrogated from the MVD awards system by order 602 of October 2013, it is no longer awarded.
	Medal "For Merit in Aviation" Медаль «За Заслуги в Авиации»	No. 970 - No. 602	2008-11-11 --- 2013-08-06	Ministerial Order was identified but not yet found in its entirety for translation to this article. Abrogated from the MVD awards system by order 602 of October 2013, it is no longer awarded.
	Medal "For Merit in Management Activities" 1st Class Медаль «За Заслуги в управленческой деятельности» I степени	No. 355 - No. 602	2008-04-21 --- 2013-08-06	Awarded to employees of the ministry, soldiers and officers of Interior Troops, with at least 15 years of managerial service in the MVD, who have special merit in the development of system-wide or generic ministerial document management, by objectives or conceptual nature, for the effective management of divisions within the Ministry of Internal Affairs of Russia in the implementation of a set of management functions. . This medal has existed since the 1990s and has been awarbrogated from the MVD awards system by order 602 of October 2013, it is no longer awarded.
	Medal "For Merit in Management Activities" 2nd Class Медаль «За Заслуги в управленческой деятельности» II степени	No. 355 - No. 602	2008-04-21 --- 2013-08-06	Awarded to employees of the ministry, soldiers and officers of Interior Troops, with at least 10 years of managerial service in the MVD, who have made a significant contribution in the introduction and development of new and emerging technologies in management of the Interior Ministry, in establishing science based technologies in combating crime and facing new criminal threats, in the formation of concepts and in defining required reforms in police and Interior forces, in the development of effective mechanisms for the implementation of advanced forms and methods of successfully carrying out operational and combat tasks, in improving the management of subordinate units of internal affairs bodies and internal troops of Russia. Abrogated from the MVD awards system by order 602 of October 2013, it is no longer awarded.
	Medal "For Merit in Management Activities" 3rd Class Медаль «За Заслуги в управленческой деятельности» III степени	No. 355 - No. 602	2008-04-21 --- 2013-08-06	Awarded to employees of the ministry, soldiers and officers of Interior Troops, with at least 5 years of managerial service in the MVD who have distinguished themselves in the introduction of new science-based managerial approaches for internal affairs agencies and offices, for the preparation of other documents used in of crime fighting, for the development of socially significant predictive and analytical papers, complex research problems on crime and crime fighting, in laying the groundwork for inter-agency cooperation and other documents that define the format of multilateral cooperation, for optimizing system goals and objectives of the Ministry of Internal Affairs of Russia on the scale of major public policies, strengthening institutional foundations and prestige of internal units in Russia, for the effective organization of work of internal affairs bodies and units of the Interior Ministry of Russia, for professional excellence and high personal achievements. Abrogated from the MVD awards system by order 602 of October 2013, it is no longer awarded.
	Medal "200 Years of the Ministry of Internal Affairs" Медаль «200 Лет Министерство Внутренних ДЕЛ»	No. 542 - No. 602	2002-06-05 --- 2013-08-06	Awarded to military and civilian personnel or former officers or civilian personnel of the Ministry of the Interior of the Russian Federation who served faultlessly for 20 years or more. Abrogated from the MVD awards system by order 602 of October 2013, it is no longer awarded.
	Medal "70 Years of the Economic Security Units of the MVD of Russia" Медаль «70 Лет подразделениям экономической безопасности МВД России»	No. 140 - No. 602	2007-02-07 --- 2013-08-06	Awarded to personnel of the economic security staff of the Interior Ministry of the Russian Federation for achievements in operational performance and management; to civil servants and employees for faultless service and/or the promotion of the units of economic security; citizens and foreign nationals who provide substantial assistance to units of the economic security of the MVD in the implementation of their tasks. Abrogated from the MVD awards system by order 602 of October 2013, it is no longer awarded.
	Medal "100 Years of Canine Units of the MVD of Russia" Медаль «100 лет кинологическим подразделениям МВД России»	No. 347 - No. 602	2009-05-06 --- 2013-08-06	Awarded to soldiers, officers and employees of canine units of the Interior Ministry of the Russian Federation and military dog units of Interior Troops of Russia for professional excellence, achievements in the service-operational and operational performance; to veterans of the service and ex employees of Internal Affairs of the Russian Federation, servicemen of internal troops of Russia who have made a significant contribution to the development of canine units; to Russian citizens and foreign nationals who provide substantial assistance to dogs unit in implementing the tasks entrusted to them. Abrogated from the MVD awards system by order 602 of October 2013, it is no longer awarded.
	Medal "200 Years of Interior Troops" Медаль «200 лет внутренним войскам МВД России»	No. 679 - No. 602	2010-09-24 --- 2013-08-06	Awarded to soldiers and members of the civilian staff of internal forces, as well as to citizens discharged from military service who impeccably served in (worked for) Internal Troops for 20 years or more, or receiving a disability pension (without a set length of service) or who are combat veterans. Can be awarded to both Russian and foreign citizens. Abrogated from the MVD awards system by order 602 of October 2013, it is no longer awarded.
	Medal "For the Promotion of Interior Troops" Медаль «За Содействие ВВ МВД»	No. 347 - No. 157	2009-05-06 --- 2016-04-05	Awarded to recognise the citizens of the Russian Federation and foreign nationals who promote the work carried out by the armed forces of the Interior Ministry of Russia and assist in fulfilling the responsibilities and combat assignments entrusted to the service. Medal no longer exists since the dissolution of Internal Troops and the creation of the Russian National Guard

=== Abrogated decorations ===
Award	Name (English/Russian)	Order	Order Date	Award Criteria
	Breast badge "Exemplary Worker of the Criminal Police" Нагрудный знак «Лучший сотрудник криминальной милиции»	No. 633 - No. 602	2000-06-14 --- 2013-08-06	Awarded after at least five years of service in the criminal police for courage and dedication shown during the performance of duty; for achieving high personal standards, for improvement of professional skills in preventing and solving crimes or capturing wanted criminals; for the development and introduction of new crime fighting techniques, enhancing the effectiveness of the criminal police service, for initiative and resourcefulness; for active cooperation with other services of the Ministry of Internal Affairs which contributes to strengthening the protection of public order and crime fighting. Abrogated from the MVD awards system by order 602 of October 2013, it is no longer awarded.
	Breast badge "Exemplary District Police Inspector" Нагрудный знак «Лучший участковый инспектор милиции»	No. 633 - No. 602	2000-06-14 --- 2013-08-06	Awarded to district police inspectors and senior inspectors of police precincts who have attained the highest results in the discharge of their duties and have occupied their positions for at least five years. Abrogated from the MVD awards system by order 602 of October 2013, it is no longer awarded.
	Breast badge "Exemplary Employee of the Militia Patrol-Guard Service" Нагрудный знак «Лучший сотрудник патрульно-постовой службы милиции»	No. 633 - No. 602	2000-06-14 --- 2013-08-06	Awarded to members of police patrol services who have worked continuously in the patrol service for not less than five years: for high personal achievements in operational performance, for improving professional skills in the prevention, detection and solving of crimes and the arrest of wanted criminals; for the development and introduction of new working methods enhancing the effectiveness of the patrol service, for initiative and resourcefulness; for active cooperation with other bodies of the MVD contributing to the enhancement of public order and strengthening the fight against crime. Abrogated from the MVD awards system by order 602 of October 2013, it is no longer awarded.
	Breast badge "Exemplary Worker in Fire Prevention" Нагрудный знак «Лучший работник пожарной охраны»	No. 633 - No. 602	2000-06-14 --- 2013-08-06	Awarded to members of the State Fire Service, the military, fire service and fire prevention services of other ministries, departments and organisations, members of voluntary fire units, who have served in that capacity for at least five years: for dedication and exemplary work in fire-fighting, in accident and disaster relief, during natural disasters, in rescues, in the protection of public and private property from fire; for active and fruitful work in promoting fire security; for excellence in design and implementation of advanced fire fighting equipment and techniques; for active assistance in the activities of the State Fire Service. Abrogated from the MVD awards system by order 602 of October 2013, it is no longer awarded.
	Breast badge "Exemplary Inspector of the Juvenile Division" Нагрудный знак «Лучший инспектор по делам несовершеннолетних»	No. 633 - No. 602	2000-06-14 --- 2013-08-06	Awarded to staff members of the Juvenile Division and temporary isolation institutions for juvenile offenders who have attained the highest results in the discharge of their duties and have worked in their positions for at least five years. Abrogated from the MVD awards system by order 602 of October 2013, it is no longer awarded.
	Breast badge "Exemplary Employee of Special Militia Units" Нагрудный знак «Лучший сотрудник специальных подразделений милиции»	No. 633 - No. 602	2000-06-14 --- 2013-08-06	Awarded to members of police special units who have attained the highest results in the performance of their duties and worked in special intervention units for at least five years. Abrogated from the MVD awards system by order 602 of October 2013, it is no longer awarded.
	Breast badge "Exemplary Investigator" Нагрудный знак «Лучший следователь»	No. 633 - No. 602	2000-06-14 --- 2013-08-06	Awarded to middle, senior and top management officials of the investigative apparatus of the ministry who have been in post for a minimum of five continuous years: for courage and dedication displayed during the performance of duty; for achieving high personal performance indicators, for improvement of professional skills; for the development and introduction of new working methods to enhance effectiveness of the investigative apparatus; for active cooperation with other MVD agencies which contributes to the fight against crime. Abrogated from the MVD awards system by order 602 of October 2013, it is no longer awarded.
	Breast badge "Exemplary Detective" Нагрудный знак «Лучший дознаватель»	No. 633 - No. 602	2000-06-14 --- 2013-08-06	Awarded to middle and senior management officials of investigative units who continuously worked in the Interior Ministry for at least five years: for courage and dedication displayed in the performance of official duties; for achieving high personal operational performance indicators, for improving professional skills; for the development and introduction of new working methods, for enhancing the effectiveness of investigative units; for active cooperation with other agencies and bodies of the Interior Ministry contributing to strengthening the fight against crime. Abrogated from the MVD awards system by order 602 of October 2013, it is no longer awarded.
	Breast badge "Excellent Militia" Нагрудный знак «Отличник милиции»	No. 633 - No. 989 - No. 602	2000-06-14 --- 2012-10-31 --- 2013-08-06	Awarded to officers from the rank and file, to junior command personnel of the militia, with at least three years of service in the militia (police), for providing police training to cadets and students of educational institutions of the MVD of Russia, for high achievement of standards in maintaining public order and fighting crime, for the improvement of professional qualifications, for bravery, ingenuity and initiative in the performance of official duties. Abrogated from the MVD awards system by order 602 of October 2013, it is no longer awarded.
	Breast badge "Excellent Fire-fighter" Нагрудный знак «Отличный пожарный»	No. 633 - No. 602	2000-06-14 --- 2013-08-06	Awarded to the rank and file, junior command personnel, employees of the State Fire Service, cadets and students of educational institutions of the MVD of Russia, conducting training for the SFS, as well as employees of fire services of other ministries, departments and organisations, members of voluntary fire units, in position for no less than three years, which have achieved high standards in fire prevention and fire-fighting, in raising their professional qualifications, for bold and decisive action demonstrated in the performance of duty. Abrogated from the MVD awards system by order 602 of October 2013, it is no longer awarded.
	Breast badge "200 Years of the MVD of Russia" Нагрудный знак «200 лет МВД России»	No. 707 - No. 602	2002-07-25 --- 2013-08-06	Awarded to officers and employees of internal affairs, military and civilian personnel of internal security forces and federal public servants for faithful performance regardless of length of service (work); to former employees of internal affairs or veterans of military internal forces who impeccably served in bodies of internal affairs or in the Internal Troops of Russia and had previously received awards from institutions or organs of the criminal police, correctional system, state fire service, federal bodies of the tax police, Customs Service of the Russian Federation and other federal bodies with executive powers who provide for military service; to citizens who have rendered assistance in the tasks entrusted to the MVD of Russia. Abrogated from the MVD awards system by order 602 of October 2013, it is no longer awarded.
	Breast badge "200 Years of Interior Troops of Russia" Нагрудный знак «200 лет внутренним войскам МВД России»	No. 680 - No. 602	2010-09-24 --- 2013-08-06	Awarded to military and civilian personnel of internal troops of Russia who conscientiously fulfill their duties and responsibilities regardless of length of service. For assisting the internal forces in carrying out their assigned tasks and/or combat missions as well as for international cooperation with Interior Ministry troops of Russia. Can be awarded to both Russian and foreign citizens. Abrogated from the MVD awards system by order 602 of October 2013, it is no longer awarded.
	Breast badge "For Faithful Duty" Нагрудный знак «За верность долгу»	No. 633 - No. 602	2000-06-14 --- 2013-08-06	Awarded to employees of the Interior Ministry who have worked continuously in the same service for at least five years: for courage and dedication shown during the performance of duties; for achieving high personal performance indicators, for improvement of professional skills; for the development and introduction of new working methods enhancing the effectiveness of ministerial agencies; for active cooperation with other services of Internal Affairs which contributes to strengthening the protection of public order and strengthening crime fighting. Abrogated from the MVD awards system by order 602 of October 2013, it is no longer awarded.
	Breast badge "For Distinction" in Non-Departmental Security of the MVD Нагрудный знак «За Отличие» вневедомственной охраны МВД	No. 574 - No. 602	1999-08-02 --- 2013-08-06	Awarded to officers and employees of non-departmental security units of the Ministry of Internal Affairs who have served in the ministry for at least 15 years, for achieving high operational and managerial standards of performance in the protection of business and individual property, in the protection of public order, for personal initiative and perseverance in the line of duty. Also awarded to employees of other entities of the MVD, as well as citizens for their active assistance in the development and improvement of non-departmental security, enhancing the credibility and image of the service, for dedication and courage in combating crime, apprehending criminals, or that have made a great contribution to the development of the service. Abrogated from the MVD awards system by order 602 of October 2013, it is no longer awarded.
	Breast badge "For Distinction in Service in the GAI"; 1st Class Нагрудный знак «За отличие в службе ГАИ» I степени	No. 50 - No. 602	1997-01-25 --- 2013-08-06	Awarded to employees of the Main Directorate for Road Traffic Safety (GAI) who have served in the ministry for at least 15 years with at least 5 years with the GAI, for achieving high performance indicators in enforcing preventive measures aimed at reducing the severity of road - traffic injuries, or in the suppression of offences to road safety. May also be awarded honorarily to representatives of other ministries, departments, enterprises, organizations and institutions for their active participation in the aforementioned activities. Abrogated from the MVD awards system by order 602 of October 2013, it is no longer awarded.
	Breast badge "For Distinction in Service in the GAI"; 2nd class Нагрудный знак «За отличие в службе ГАИ» II степени	No. 50 - No. 602	1997-01-25 --- 2013-08-06	Awarded to employees of the Main Directorate for Road Traffic Safety (GAI) who have served in the ministry for at least 10 years with at least 5 years with the GAI, for achieving high performance indicators in enforcing preventive measures aimed at reducing the severity of road - traffic injuries, or in the suppression of offences to road safety. May also be awarded honorarily to representatives of other ministries, departments, enterprises, organizations and institutions for their active participation in the aforementioned activities. Abrogated from the MVD awards system by order 602 of October 2013, it is no longer awarded.
	Breast badge "For Distinction in Service of Interior Troops of Russia"; 1st Class Нагрудный знак «За отличие в службе ВВ МВД России» I степени	No. 28 - No. 989 - No. 602 - No. 157	1995-01-27 --- 2012-10-31 --- 2013-08-06 --- 2016-04-05	Awarded to military personnel of Internal Troops of Russia previously awarded the decoration "For Distinction in Service of Interior Troops of Russia" 2nd class, for initiative, diligence and distinction displayed during the performance of the tasks of maintaining public order, the protection of important state facilities and special cargoes; for active participation and distinction displayed in the line of duty in order to eliminate the consequences of accidents, fires, natural disasters and other emergencies; for high performance in combat training. May also be awarded to other citizens for the promotion of Russian Interior Troops and assistance in the performance of their tasks. Decoration no longer exists following the dissolution of Internal troops and the creation of the Russian National Guard.
	Breast badge "For Distinction in Service of Interior Troops of Russia"; 2nd Class Нагрудный знак «За отличие в службе ВВ МВД России» II степени	No. 28 - No. 989 - No. 602 - No. 157	1995-01-27 --- 2012-10-31 --- 2013-08-06 --- 2016-04-05	Awarded to military personnel of Internal Troops of Russia for initiative, diligence and distinction displayed during the performance of the tasks of maintaining public order, the protection of important state facilities and special cargoes; for active participation and distinction displayed in the line of duty in order to eliminate the consequences of accidents, fires, natural disasters and other emergencies; for high performance in combat training. May also be awarded to other citizens for the promotion of Russian Interior Troops and assistance in the performance of their tasks. Decoration no longer exists following the dissolution of Internal troops and the creation of the Russian National Guard.

=== Commemorative, veteran & public awards ===
Award	Name (English/Russian)	Order	Inception Date	Award Criteria
	Medal "70 Years of the Traffic Control Division of the State Automobile Inspectorate for Road Safety" Медаль «70 Лет ОРУД-ГАИ-ГИБДД»	No. ?	2006	Medal was confirmed as having been awarded but Ministerial Order not yet found and is possibly unpublished to date.
	Medal "50 Years of Department 6 of the MVD of Russia" Медаль «50 лет шестое УВД МВД России»	No. ?	2007	Medal was confirmed as having been awarded but Ministerial Order not yet found and is possibly unpublished to this date.
	Medal "90 Years of the Russian Militia" Медаль «90 Лет Милиция России»	No. ?	2007	Medal was confirmed as having been awarded but Ministerial Order not yet found and is possibly unpublished to this date.
	Medal "15 Years of the "LYNX" Special Rapid Response Unit" Медаль «15 Лет СОБР-ОМСН РЫСЬ»	No. ?	2007	Medal was confirmed as having been awarded but Ministerial Order not yet found and is possibly unpublished to this date.
	Medal "90 Years of the Personnel Office of the MVD of Russia" Медаль «90 Лет кадровой службе МВД России»	No. ?	2008	Medal was confirmed as having been awarded but Ministerial Order not yet found and is possibly unpublished to this date.
	Medal "90 Years of Criminal Investigations" Медаль «90 Лет Уголовному Розыску»	No. ?	?	Medal was confirmed as having been awarded but Ministerial Order not yet found and is possibly unpublished to this date.
	Medal "90 Years of Staff Units of the MVD" Медаль «90 Лет Штабным Подразделениям МВД»	No. ?	?	Medal was confirmed as having been awarded but Ministerial Order not yet found and is possibly unpublished to this date.
	Medal "100 Years of Fingerprint Records in Russia" Медаль «100 Лет Дактилоскопическому Учету В России»	No. ?	?	Medal was confirmed as having been awarded but Ministerial Order not yet found and is possibly unpublished to this date.
	Medal "90 Years of the Information Service" Медаль «90 Лет информационная служба»	No. ?	2008	Medal was confirmed as having been awarded but Ministerial Order not yet found and is possibly unpublished to this date.
	Medal "85 Years of ODON of the Internal Troops of Russia" Медаль «85 лет ОДОН ВВ МВД России»	No. ?	2009	Medal was confirmed as having been awarded but Ministerial Order not yet found and is possibly unpublished to this date.
	Medal "40 Years of Units for Licences and Permits" Медаль «40 лет подразделениям лицензионно-разрешительной работы»	No. ?	2009	Medal was confirmed as having been awarded but Ministerial Order not yet found and is possibly unpublished to this date.
	Medal "70 Years of MVD Drunk Tanks" Медаль «70 лет медвытрезвители МВД»	No. ?	2010	Medal was confirmed as having been awarded but Ministerial Order not yet found and is possibly unpublished to this date.
	Medal "75 years of the Russian MVD juvenile services" Медаль «75 лет служба ПДН МВД России»	No. ?	2010-05-31	1935-2010
	Commemorative Medal "For merit in the fight against organized crime and terrorism" Памятная медаль «За заслуги в борьбе с организованной преступностью и терроризмом»	No. ?	2013-09-10	Medal of the Association of veterans of the MVD awarded to staff members and veterans of departments and units charged with the fight against organized crime and terrorism and of departments and units charged with countering extremism of the organs of the Ministry of Internal Affairs of the Russian Federation, for achievements in operational service activities. May also be awarded to citizens of the Russian Federation and foreign nationals for providing significant assistance to organs of the Interior Ministry of the Russian Federation in the fight against organized crime, terrorism, extremism and the tasks assigned to them.
	Medal "80 years of the Russian MVD juvenile services" Медаль «80 лет служба ПДН МВД России»	No. ?	2015-05-31	1935-2015

=== Regional & departmental awards ===
Award	Name (English/Russian)	Order	Inception Date	Award Criteria
	Medal "Veteran of the MVD" Медаль «Ветеран МВД»	No. ?	?	Abrogation order not yet found. Medal currently not in MVD awards system.
	Medal "For Merit in Financial and Economic Activities" Медаль «За Заслуги в финансово-экономической деятельности»	No. ?	?	Abrogation order not yet found. Medal currently not in MVD awards system.
	Medal "90 years of the Moscow Criminal Investigation Department" Медаль «90 Лет Московскому Уголовному Розыску»		2008	
	Medal "For Excellence In Criminal Investigation In The Saint Petersburg And Leningrad District" Медаль «За Отличие; ГУВД Санкт-Петербурга И Ленинградской Области»			
	Medal "45 Years of Criminal Investigations in the North-West (Saint Petersburg And Leningrad) District" Медаль «45 лет следственное управление при северо-западном УВДТ МВД РФ»		2008	
	Medal "90 Years of the Criminal Investigations Department of the Moscow Region" Медаль ««90 лет уголовного следственное управление Московской области"»		2008	
	Medal "80 Years of the North West Department of Internal Affairs on Transport" Медаль «80 Лет Северо-Западному УВД На Транспорте»			
	Medal "90 Years of Criminal Investigations in the Sverdlovsk Region" Медаль «90 лет Уголовный Розыск Свердловская область»		2008	
	Medal "70 Years of the Interior Department on Economic Crimes of the Khanty–Mansi Autonomous Territory" Медаль «70 лет УБЭП УВД по ХМАО-Югра»			
	Breast badge "Honoured Fellow of the OVDRO" Нагрудный знак «Почетный Сотрудник ОВДРО»	№ ?	?	Award of the Department of Law Enforcement in Restricted Areas and Sensitive Sites (OVDRO). Establishment decree not yet published.

== Federal Migration Service ==
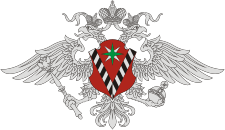

Award	Name (English/Russian)	Order	Inception Date	Award Criteria
	Breast Badge "For Merit"; Нагрудный Знак «За Заслуги»			
	Medal "For Service"; 1st Class Медаль «За службу» I степени	No. 455	2007-12-12	Awarded to police officers assigned to the Federal Migration Service of Russia, to federal civil servants and employees of the Federal Migration Service of Russia, for faithful service (work) during continuous service of at least 15 years.
	Medal "For Service"; 2nd class Медаль «За службу» II степени	No. 455	2007-12-12	Awarded to police officers assigned to the Federal Migration Service of Russia, to federal civil servants and employees of the Federal Migration Service of Russia, for faithful service (work) during continuous service of at least 10 years.
	Medal "For Diligence" Медаль «За усердие»	No. 456	2007-12-12	Awarded to officers of the various bodies of the MVD assigned to the FMS of Russia and the civil servants of the Federal Migration Service for high work performance, achievements in the development of the FMS of Russia, the protection of the rights and interests of citizens, individual initiative, and innovation.
	Medal "For Faithful Service" Медаль «За добросовестную службу»	No. 104	2007-05-10	Awarded to police officers assigned to the Federal Migration Service of Russia, for high performance in their work, personal initiative, exemplary dedication and impeccable service; to civil servants of the Federal Migration Service of Russia, for the faithful performance of duties, innovation and impeccable service.
	Medal "For Merit" Медаль «За заслуги»	No. 104	2007-05-10	Awarded to employees of state, public, religious and other associations, organizations, enterprises, institutions, art groups and unions, for their active support and assistance of the Federal Migration Service, in ensuring its development, skills, moral and cultural and aesthetic education of police officers assigned to the FMS Russia, civil servants and employees of the Federal Migration Service of Russia, for raising the prestige of the Russian Federal Migration Service in the community; to other persons providing assistance to the FMS of Russia in solving its tasks.
	Medal "For Special Merit" for the Sverdlovsk Region Медаль «За особые заслуги» по Свердловской области			

== Emblems of the Ministry of Internal Affairs ==
Branch/Department	Emblem	Branch/Department	Emblem
Ministry of Internal Affairs; Министерство внутренних дел		Internal Troops внутренними войсками	

== See also ==
- Ministry of Internal Affairs (Russia)
- Internal Troops of Russia
- Ministry of Internal Affairs (Soviet Union)
- Internal Troops of the Soviet Union
- Awards and emblems of the Ministry of Defence of the Russian Federation
- Awards of the Ministry for Emergency Situations of Russia
- Awards of the Federal Security Service of the Russian Federation
- Awards of the Federal Protective Service of the Russian Federation
- Awards and decorations of the Russian Federation
- Ministerial awards of the Russian Federation
- Honorary titles of the Russian Federation
- Awards and decorations of the Soviet Union

== Other sources ==
- Russian Legal Library - Decrees and Regulations Consultant Plus In Russian
- Ilia Kuzmichev & Alexander Triphon (2004). Award System of Uniformed Departments of the Russian Federation. Moscow: Bratishka.
- Internet Portal Russian Symbols In Russian
