= Medal "For Distinction in the Protection of Public Order" =

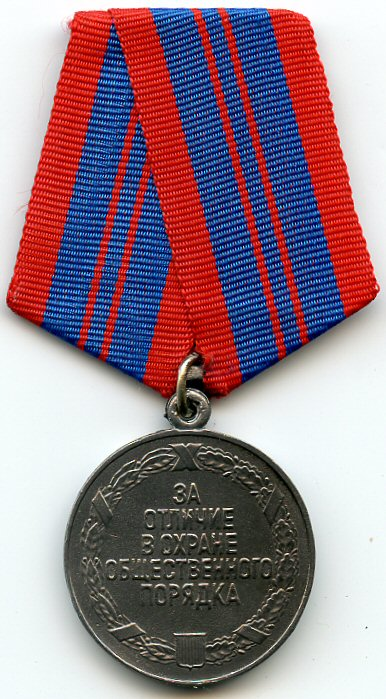
- Medal "For Distinction in the Protection of Public Order" (obverse)
- Type: State decoration
- Awarded for: Courage and bravery displayed while maintaining public order and combating crime
- Presented by: Russian Federation; USSR
- Eligibility: MVD employees and soldiers
- Status: Active
- Established: November 1, 1950
- Ribbon of the Medal "For Distinction in Protection of Public Order"

Precedence
- Next (higher): Medal Defender of a Free Russia
- Next (lower): Medal "For Distinction in the Protection of the State Borders"

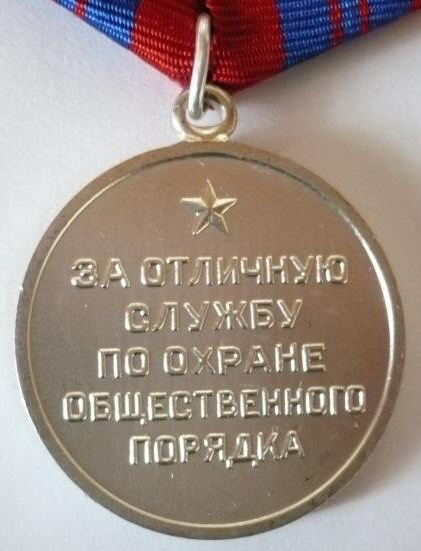
Obverse of the Soviet variant of the Medal "For Distinction in the Protection of Public Order"

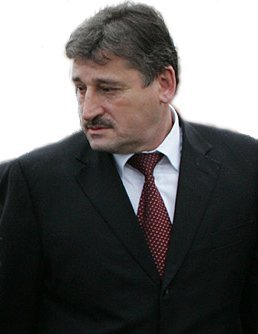
Career police officer and 2nd President of the Chechen Republic Alu Alkhanov, a recipient of the Medal "For Distinction in Protection of Public Order"

The Medal "For Distinction in the Protection of Public Order" (Russian: Медаль «За отличие в охране общественного порядка») is a government decoration of Russia, retained from the awards system of the Soviet Union established to recognise outstanding service by members of law enforcement bodies or to civilians for courage in assisting law enforcement personnel in their duties.

== Award history ==
The Medal "For Distinction in the Protection of Public Order" was established by decree of the Presidium of the Supreme Soviet of the USSR of November 1, 1950. The medal's statute was amended on July 18, 1980 by decree of the Presidium of the Supreme Soviet of the USSR № 2523-X.

It was retained in the Russian awards system following the dissolution of the USSR by decree of the President of the Russian Federation № 442 of March 2, 1994 and later confirmed by presidential decree № 19 of January 6, 1999. Presidential decree № 1099 of September 7, 2010 amended the entire Russian awards system, this included changes to the medal's statute.

== Original Soviet statute ==
The Medal "For Distinction in the Protection of Public Order" was awarded to soldiers and officers of law enforcement bodies and to soldiers of Internal Troops for exploits and achievements displayed in the protection of public order and the fight against crime; it could also be awarded to members of volunteer people's guards, and to other citizens for active participation in the protection of public order and for displaying courage and dedication. The medal was awarded on behalf of the Presidium of the Supreme Soviet of the USSR and of other Soviet republics.

The Medal "For Distinction in the Protection of Public Order" was awarded for:

- bravery and dedication displayed during the dismantling of criminal groups and the detention of criminals;
- bold, expertly prepared and conducted covert operations aimed at preventing criminal offenses;
- active work and research on the causes and conditions conducive to criminal offenses;
- skilful organization of internal affairs units and internal forces for the protection of public order and the fight against crime;
- excellent performance of duties in the organs of internal affairs or in the units internal forces;
- active participation in the protection of public order and for displaying courage and selflessness,
- active participation in the fight against hooliganism, drunkenness, theft of socialist and personal property, violation of the rules of trade, speculation, distilling and other offenses, harmful to society.

The Soviet medal was worn on the left side of the chest and was located immediately after the Medal "For Distinction in Guarding the State Border of the USSR". It could be awarded posthumously to the surviving family of a member deceased in the line of duty.

== Modern Russian Federation statute ==
The Medal "For Distinction in the Protection of Public Order" is awarded to employees of the Interior Ministry of the Russian Federation, to soldiers of Internal Troops of the Ministry of Internal Affairs of the Russian Federation, to other troops for courage and bravery displayed while maintaining public order and combating crime, for high performance in service, as well as to other citizens for their assistance to the Interior Ministry of the Russian Federation in their efforts to protect public order.

The Russian Federation Order of Precedence dictates the Medal "For Distinction in Protection of Public Order" is to be worn on the left side of the chest with other medals immediately after the Medal "Defender of a Free Russia".

== Award description ==
The Medal "For Distinction in the Protection of Public Order" is a 32mm in diameter circular silver medal with raised rims. On its obverse, the inscription on five lines "FOR DISTINCTION IN THE PROTECTION OF PUBLIC ORDER" (Russian: "ЗА ОТЛИЧИЕ В ОХРАНЕ ОБЩЕСТВЕННОГО ПОРЯДКА"), the inscription is surrounded by a wreath of oak and laurel branches following the medal's circumference laced together with a ribbon, at the bottom over the ribbon, a shield. The reverse is plain except for the relief "№" with a horizontal line for the award serial number.

The Soviet design differed from the current variant by the omission of the laurel and oak wreath from the obverse and the addition of a small five pointed star near the top above the inscription. Its reverse bore the relief image of the State Emblem of the Soviet Union over the relief inscription "USSR" (Russian: «СССР»).

The medal is suspended to a standard Russian pentagonal mount by a ring through the medal's suspension loop. The mount is covered by an overlapping 24mm wide blue silk moiré ribbon with 5mm red edge stripes and two 1mm red central stripes.

== Recipients (partial list) ==
The individuals below were all recipients of the Medal "For Distinction in the Protection of Public Order".

- MVD Army General and former Interior Minister of Russia Anatoly Sergeevich Kulikov
- 3rd President of the Chechen Republic Ramzan Akhmadovich Kadyrov
- 2nd President of the Chechen Republic Alu Dadashevich Alkhanov

== See also ==
- Orders, decorations, and medals of the Russian Federation
- Awards and decorations of the Soviet Union
