= Omsk Academy of the Ministry of Internal Affairs =

Coordinates: 54.9920°N 73.2875°E

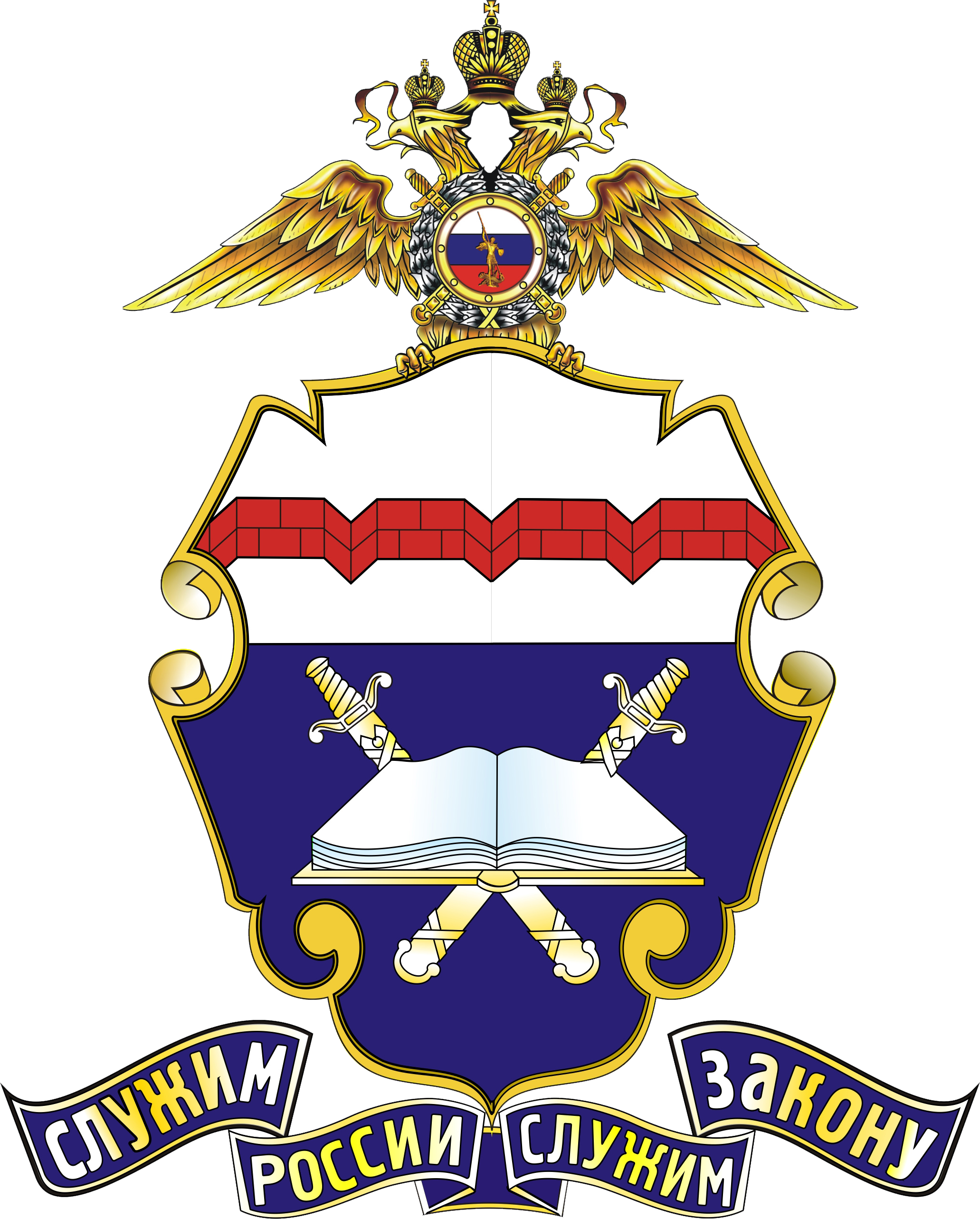
The academy logo

The Omsk Academy of the Ministry of Internal Affairs is a university in Omsk, Russia. It is a higher institution that falls under the jurisdiction of the Ministry of Internal Affairs of the Russian Federation. It is currently led by Major General Sergey Buryakov.

== Structure ==
It consists of four departments, as well as nine departments with legal, economic and humanitarian descriptions.

=== Departments ===
- Department of Administrative Law and Administrative Activities
- Department of Forensics
- Department of Investigative Activities
- Department of Criminal Procedure
- Department of Physical Training
- Department of Fire Training
- Department of Internal Affairs
- Department of Civil Law
- Department of Foreign Languages
- Department of Constitutional and International Law
- Department of Criminology, Psychology and Pedagogy
- Department of Theory and History of Law and State
- Department of Criminal Law
- Department of Information Technologies

Department of Philosophy and Political Science

- Department of Economic Theory and Financial Law
- Department of Psychology and Pedagogy

=== Governing bodies ===
- Academic Council
- Conference

=== Faculties ===
- Police Training Faculty
- Department of Investigation
- Faculty of Correspondence and Advanced Training
- Faculty of Vocational Training

== Graduates ==
- Pyotr Latyshev, the 1st Russian Presidential Envoy to the Urals Federal District
- Vladimir Rushailo, former Minister of Internal Affairs
- Vladimir Ovchinsky, Major general
