= Bereg =

Bereg may refer to:

- Bereg (Sokolac), a village in Bosnia and Herzegovina
- Bereg County, a historic county of the former Kingdom of Hungary
- Bački Breg or Bereg (Croatian), a village in Serbia
- A-222 Bereg, a Russian self-propelled 130 mm coastal defence gun
- Igor Mangushev (1986-2023) Russian mercenary who used the call sign Bereg

== See also ==
- Szabolcs–Szatmár–Bereg County, an administrative county in Hungary
