= Forbidden Art — 2006 =

Art exhibition

Forbidden Art --- 2006
- Date: 7-31 March 2007
- Venue: The Sakharov Center, Moscow, Russian Federation
- Motive: To cause a conversation around the challenges of curatorial practice of showing religiously provocative art.
- Organised by: Andrey Erofeev

Forbidden Art 2006 was an art exhibition that took place from 7 to 31 March 2007 at the Andrei Sakharov Museum and Public Center. The curator of the exhibition was art critic Andrey Erofeev.

The exhibition was sharply criticized by a number of religious and nationalist organizations, and against its organizers, Andrei Erofeev and Yuri Samodurov, a criminal case was opened for inciting religious hatred, which ended in a court conviction.

== Organization of the exhibition and exhibits ==
The exhibition showed works that were not allowed to be exhibited at exhibitions in Moscow museums and galleries in 2006. According to one of the organizers, the meaning of the exhibition was as follows:

"Our exhibition was about something else, our exhibition was not about the fact that religion is a strongly positive thing, as well as about the fact that religion is a negative thing. Our exhibition was, how to say, monitoring of those three aspects of contemporary art that the curators themselves, the art critics themselves, would like to show in museums, and the management, more often than not, wanted to show, but they are afraid - it is taboo, scary. That's scary, just because there will be complaints from believers, in particular."

— Юрий Самодуров

Among the artists whose works were exhibited are such authors as Vyacheslav Sysoev, Alexander Kosolapov, Alexander Savko, Vagrich Bakhchanyan, Blue Noses, Vyacheslav Mizin, Avdey Ter-Oganyan, Leonid Sokov, Ilya Kabakov, Mikhail Roginsky, PG group. The exhibits were hidden from viewers by a partition and were accessible for viewing through small holes in this partition.

== Criminal case against the organizers ==
As a result of the exhibition, Erofeev and the director of the Sakharov Museum, Yuri Samodurov, were charged under Article 282 of the Criminal Code of the Russian Federation (incitement to religious hatred). The criminal case was initiated at the initiative of the Russian national-conservative Orthodox movement Narodny Sobor. One of the defendants, Yuri Samodurov, said that his criminal prosecution was political, referring, in particular, to the confession of the investigator who conducted his case.

In June 2008, the curator of the exhibition, Andrei Erofeev, was fired from his main job – the Tretyakov Gallery. In an interview with the Sobkor Ru agency, Erofeev called his dismissal "a mean stab in the back".

The last court session before the sentencing was held on 21 June 2010 in the Tagansky Court of Moscow. Andrei Erofeev and Yuri Samodurov could have faced up to 5 years in prison, but the prosecutor demanded that Yuri Samodurov and Andrei Erofeev be sentenced to three years in prison. On 23 June 2010 gallery owner Marat Gelman promised to open the exhibition "Forbidden Art" in his gallery at Winzavod the day after the verdict was passed, if the verdict was not acquitted. Co-chairman of the People's Cathedral Oleg Kassin immediately announced that their lawyers are preparing and that measures will be taken in the event of an exhibition.

On 12 July 2010 the Tagansky Court of Moscow found the organizers of the Forbidden Art 2006 exhibition, Yuri Samodurov and Andrei Erofeev, guilty of inciting religious hatred and sentenced them to pay a fine. The court ordered Yuri Samodurov to pay 200 thousand rubles, and Andrei Erofeev – 150 thousand rubles. The defendants themselves did not agree with the verdict of the court and expressed their intention to appeal against it.

On 4 October 2010 the Moscow City Court dismissed the cassation appeal of Yuri Samodurov and Andrei Erofeev, recognizing the verdict to the organizers of the exhibition as legal. During the announcement of the verdict in the case in the Tagansky court on 12 July 2010, two public actions took place. Supporters of Samodurov and Erofeev, with activists of the art group Voina carried out the action "Cockroach Court", scattering about 3,000 Madagascar cockroaches in the corridor of the Tagansky court building. In turn, members of conservative organizations that demanded a guilty verdict sang psalms in the courtyard.

== Reactions ==
In defense of the exhibition and its organizers, a group of art and cultural figures spoke out, which included, in particular, Boris Groys, Ilya Kabakov, Lyudmila Ulitskaya, Igor Golomshtok, Jukka Mullinen, – in their opinion, "the criminal prosecution of these persons testifies to the neglect of freedom expression of opinions guaranteed by the Constitution of the Russian Federation". The exhibition was also supported by Ekaterina Degot, Sergey Gavrov, Marat Gelman, Grisha Bruskin, Pavel Lungin and other artists.

Artist Ekaterina Degot said that "For an attentive person, there is not the slightest doubt that contemporary art is just a screen here and behind all this there are ultra-right political forces interested in the destruction of the Sakharov Museum. If the exhibition had been arranged elsewhere, it might not have attracted such attention. Patriots mostly turn a blind eye to exhibitions in commercial galleries or Art Moscow, a little afraid of the territory of pronounced private property. But the Sakharov Museum is an eyesore".

Marat Gelman said, "As for Forbidden Art, I don't understand why there is a situation at all. This is an absolutely academic exhibition, collected works that have been banned. Exhibition-research for a narrow circle of professional people. In my mind, she should have been ignored".

=== Public and political figures ===
In defense of Erofeev and Samodurov, Russian human rights activists Lyudmila Alekseeva, Svetlana Gannushkina, Valery Borshchyov, Lydia Grafova and others spoke out, noting that the exhibition was aimed at "creating an atmosphere of social, cultural, intellectual and professional communication in society, helping the citizens of the Russian Federation in implementing their inalienable constitutional rights to a pluralism of cultural and spiritual values", while "attacks on the exhibition 'Forbidden Art - 2006' by witnesses who have never attended it are in the nature of organized persecutions of a political nature".

The Commissioner for Human Rights also declared the inadmissibility of resolving disputes about art through criminal proceedings, Vladimir Lukin.

The Minister of Culture of the Russian Federation Alexander Avdeev said that he personally did not like the exhibition, but "Samodurov and Erofeev did not cross the 'red line' of the law".

The exhibition was opposed by a number of Orthodox, nationalist and conservative organizations, including the People's Union, People's Council and others. In a statement by the leader of the People's Union Sergei Baburin, it was indicated that the exposition was "anti-religious, anti-state, extremist in nature and denigrates the Armed Forces of Russia and the Russian Orthodox Church", and the organizers of the event are worthy of imprisonment.

On 22 July 2010, at a public meeting at the Odessa National Academic Opera and Ballet Theater, Patriarch Kirill of Moscow and All Russia condemned the organizers of the Forbidden Art exhibition Andrei Erofeev and Yuri Samodurov "for the fact that they have no love for people...When we see that an artist is doing dirty tricks, and this dirty trick and filth, there is such a modern word – filth, splashes out of himself, he infects others with this".

== See also ==
- Jyllands-Posten Muhammad cartoons controversy

== Literature ==
- Виктория Ломаско, Антон Николаев Запретное искусство. — СПб: Бумкнига. — 156. — ISBN 978-5-9902108-7-5. (pdf-версия)

== Sites ==
- Запретное искусство — 2006. Фото некоторых экспонатов.
- Пресс-конференция Иосифа Бакштейна на сайте Lenta.Ru: «Можно ли судить искусство?»
- Ход суда
- Текст обвинения переданный Таганской прокураторой г. Москвы в суд: Документы по уголовному делу № 402588 о выставке «Запретное искусство — 2006» полученные из прокуратуры
- «Конфликт миров», в гостях у Кирилла Решетникова один из осужденных, бывший директор музея и общественного центра им. А. Д. Сахарова Юрий Самодуров.
