= Michail Ryklin =

Russian author

- Born: Рыклин, Михаил Кузьмич (Michail Kusmitsch Ryklin); 6 January 1948 (age 78); Leningrad (renamed as "Saint Petersburg" in 1991), Soviet Union
- Education: Moscow State University, Casale Monferrato; University of Turin
- Occupations: International philosopher Writer of books and essays University professor
- Spouse: Anna Alchuk / А́нна Алекса́ндровна Михальчу́к (1955-2008)
- Children: y
- Parents: Kusma Ryklin (father); Stalinana Sergeyevicha (mother)

Michail Ryklin (Михаил Рыклин) is a Russian author of books and essays, and an internationalist university professor of Philosophy.

== Biography ==
=== Provenance and early years ===
Michail Kusmitsch Ryklin was born in Leningrad (as it was known at that time) during the aftermath of the Great Patriotic War. Kusma Ryklin, his father, was a military physician. His mother, Stalina, was the daughter of Sergei Tschaplin, a young Soviet NKVD officer who died, probably during 1942, in the camps.

In 1965, the family relocated to Moscow.

=== Education of a philosopher ===
After studying Philosophy and Aesthetics, Ryklin graduated with a first degree in 1971 from the Philosophy faculty at Moscow State University, where his teachers included Merab Mamardashvili. A postgraduate degree from the Institute of Philosophy followed in 1977. In 1978, he successfully defended his doctoral dissertation in History of Philosophy. His doctoral work concerned the genesis of the juxtaposition between nature and culture in the works of Claude Lévi-Strauss (and indirectly Jean-Jacques Rousseau who provides Lévi-Strauss with his starting point for this theme). He worked during this period as a research assistant, first at the Institute of Philosophy and then at the Soviet Social Sciences Research Institute in Moscow. In 1984, he returned to the Institute of Philosophy, now as a senior researcher.

=== International dimension ===
In 1987, Ryklin accepted a visiting lectureship at the University of Tartu in Estonia, which at that time was |part of the]] Soviet Union. A few years later, in 1990, a visit to Moscow by the charismatic Paris-based deconstructist (philosopher) Jacques Derrida persuaded him to acknowledge to himself that there was a wider world of philosophy. Paris, evidently, was still an important centre of "western" philosophy. If Ryklin was impressed by Derrida, the favourable impression was evidently mutual: Derrida was able to arrange an appropriate bursary, and Ryklin took a year's contract as a lecturer at the Social Sciences Institute in 1991. During 1991/92, he worked as a senior lecturer at the Graduate School for Social Studies ("École des hautes études en sciences sociales" / EHESS) in Paris. Those whom he met in Paris included Gilles Deleuze, Félix Guattari, Jean Baudrillard and Paul Virilio. Some of their conversations - and those involving other philosopher-scholars - were later published as a book.

In 1992, Ryklin accepted a visiting professorship at Strasbourg. That was followed by a period of several years based primarily in the U.S.

During 1992/93, he was a visiting professor and Fellow of the Society for the Humanities at Cornell University in Upstate New York. During 1993, he also took a visiting professorship at the University of California at San Diego. While he studied and taught in Paris, his wife had been able to visit him for the odd week. However, New York and California were too far from Moscow for that to be practical, so she had accompanied him throughout his time in America. There were no possibilities for a free-spirited Russian language writer and performer of poetry to recreate her Moscow career on the American West Coast, and Anna Alchuk desperately missed her life in Moscow. Russians who had grown up before 1991 had learned to think of Moscow as an intellectually stifling environment for intellectuals such as the Ryklins; however, by 1995 - and until around 2000 - there was a widespread perception that, when it came to freedom of thought and expression, Russia was becoming more like the rest of Europe by the day. During the middle part of the decade, the couple abandoned their life in America and returned home to Moscow. In 1994, Michail Ryklin accepted a visiting professorship at the Russian State University for the Humanities.

During the early 1990s, Ryklin had been able to become well networked, and among fellow academics well respected in the west. In 1994, he became a member of the New York Academy of Sciences. In 1995, he also became a regular correspondent-contributor for the West Berlin-based German edition of the quarterly cultural magazine "Lettre International", founded in 1988 and, since then, under the directorship of Frank Berberich, (who also served as editor-in-chief until 2003). For Michail Ryklin, "Lettre International" provided a platform that kept him on the radar of Europe's academic philosophers, and provided an involvement in the "European community of nations" in which, until 2003, it was still possible for some people - including, perhaps, Ryklin himself - to see Russia as a participant, though after 1999 an increasingly semi-detached one.

In 1997, Ryklin accepted a senior research fellowship in Philosophical Anthropology at the Russian Academy of Sciences in Moscow. He then, in 1998, added a visiting professorship at the University of Bremen. In 2000, he became a founder member of the Walter Benjamin Society in Barcelona. In 2002, he took a visiting professorship at the University of Bristol in England. He then, in 2005, became a member of the Heiner Müller Society.

=== Leaving Moscow ===
The event which finally persuaded Ryklin that he needed to take his family away from Moscow took place at Moscow's Sakharov Center in 2003. (It was only after her death that he came to an understanding of how deeply networked and rooted in the Russian capital his wife had become.) It may have been the events themselves or the award-winning book that Ryklin wrote about the affair which made emigration inevitable. On 18 January 2003, an art exhibition featuring 40 artists was violently attacked and the paintings damaged and destroyed (with paint). Anna Alchuk was one of those whose works were included. The exhibition of contemporary art was advertised under the evidently provocative title "Осторожно, религия!" ("Watch out, Religion!"). The attackers are described variously in sources as "Orthodox fundamentalists" or "Cossacks". Anna was very badly shaken up by the experience. What followed was in some ways more shocking, however. The Russian authorities arrested the attackers and three of the exhibitors without making any distinction between the two classes of suspect. Anna was among the arrested. On 12 February 2003, the Russian parliament passed a motion calling on the public prosecutor to take action against the exhibition organisers on a charge of "inciting religious hatred". The principal defendant was the lead organiser of the exhibition, the director of the Sakharov Center Yuri Samodurov. There were never any criminal charges brought against the intruders and Samodurov was persuaded at an early stage to abandon preparations for a civil case in respect of the destruction and damage involving the art works. This had the advantage, from the point of view of the prosecuting authorities, that no lawyer representing the Sakharov Center was able to attend the court in respect of the legal proceedings that were pursued. The only lawyers who could be found to defend the accused artists and exhibition were known human rights activists. The legal proceedings dragged on for approximately eighteen months, during the course of which one of the accused committed suicide. The survivors faced heavy fines.

"Mit dem Recht des Stärkeren: Die russische Kultur in Zeiten der gelenkten Demokratie" (loosely, "With the law of the strongest: Russian culture in times of Guided democracy"), Ryklin's careful but anguished chronicle of these events, was published in German translation in 2006, winning for the author the 2007 Leipzig Book Award for European Understanding.

During 2013, Ryklin was back in Moscow for several days at the start of March, working at the Sakharov Center as one of the "main presenters" in Milo Rau remarkable big-screen production, The Moscow Trials.

=== Later years ===
Michail Ryklin has made his home in Germany since 2007. During the 2014/15 winter semester, he accepted a fellowship at the Morphomata International Center for Advanced Studies, a centre for literary and related research, sponsored by the German government "under the auspices of the 'Freedom for Research in the Humanities' initiative", and located at the University of Cologne.

== Anna ==
Michail Ryklin met the artist-poet Anna Alchuk Mikhalchuk in 1973. They married in 1975: in due course, the couple's daughter was born. They were together for 33 years. In November 2007 they moved to Berlin-Charlottenburg in order that Ryklin might take up a guest professorship at the nearby university. Anna started to learn German. !Since she had mother tongue Russian and was also fluent in English, she would, from the outset, have been able to make herself understood even with minimal German, since she would have encountered very few people in the area who had not studied either Russian at school in East Berlin / East Germany or English at school in West Berlin / West Germany.)

On 21 March 2008, Anna announced to her husband that she was going out to buy food and left the apartment. Michail Ryklin never saw his wife alive again. On 11 April 2008, her body was found in the water on one side of the Mühlendammschleuse (lock) in the city centre. The body was badly degraded, but the wedding ring was instantly identifiable. Further investigation of the body disclosed that the blood contained traces of sleeping pills at twenty times the "normal" concentration. There was damage to the larynx and a stab wound in the right side of the torso with a broken needle inside. A cap was pulled down over the face. (It had been an exceptionally cold, wet and windy day when Anna had set out on her final shopping trip.) There was immediate speculation that Anna Alchuk had been murdered. The killing of Anna Politkovskaya in October 2006 and of Alexander Litvinenko in November 2006 meant that "mysterious" killings of this citizens were part of the public news agenda. Ryklin shared some ideas with the investigating authorities in a letter. He urged them to take more seriously the possibility that there might be a political aspect to Anna's disappearance and the subsequent discovery of her dead body: "Through her critical engagement with Russian society, and because of her Jewish provenance, Mrs Mikhalchuk was exposed to daily repression and threats of violence. Crimes of political violence against critics of the Russian government have increased massively in recent years. So you should not rule out a politically motivated or antisemitic crime in this case." Nevertheless, the forensic evidence failed to provide conclusive evidence of murder. Ryklin spent the next three years systematically investigating the circumstances of his wife's death. After the police investigation ran out of steam Ryklin was able to obtain the police file of it: this ran to more than 100 pages He also made a close study of Anna's carefully compiled and indexed diaries which filled 22 notebooks. After three years he had found out many things about his marriage and about the state of his wife's mind of which he had been unaware during her lifetime. He had confirmation of his own conclusion - which he had reached fairly early on during his researches - that Anna's death had been a suicide And he had what amounted to a virtually completed book on his wife's suicide. But, as he later told an interviewer, he could not bring himself to write the final ten pages. That took another two years. Michail Ryklin's "Buch über Anna" ("Book about Anna") was published in German only in 2014. The author had completed the text in Russian the previous year.
