= Svetlaya Rus =

Russian nationalist movement

- Светлая Русь
- Formation: 2009
- Founder: Igor Mangushev
- Purpose: Russian nationalism

Svetlaya Rus (Russian: Светлая Русь, lit. 'Bright Rus') is a Russian nationalist movement, founded in 2009 by Russian nationalist mercenary Igor Mangushev (1986–2023).

== Name ==
Svetlaya Rus translates as "Bright Rus'" or "Light-Skinned Rus'" in English, and is synonymous with a "mono-ethnic, neo-pagan technocratic nation state."

== History and activities ==
Svetlaya Rus is a Russian militia movement founded in 2009 by Russian nationalist mercenary Igor Mangushev. Membership in the group was initially drawn from the Russian Orthodox Church-aligned Narodny Sobor movement, as well as various Russian patriotic movements. Several members in the group were former law enforcement officials or had otherwise become connected with Russia's Federal Migration Service.

The initial activity of the organisation was a December 30, 2009 rally for recently murdered priest Daniil Sysoev. Soon after, the organisation started identifying undocumented Uzbekistan, Kyrgyzstan and Tajikistan migrants to the police. In 2011, the organisation raided Krasnaya Presnya residences in search of migrants. As the Russo-Ukrainian War started, Svetlaya Rus organised pro-Russian events in Crimea.

== See also ==
- Northern Brotherhood
- E.N.O.T. Corp.
