= Anna Alchuk =

Russian painter, poet and author (1955–2008)

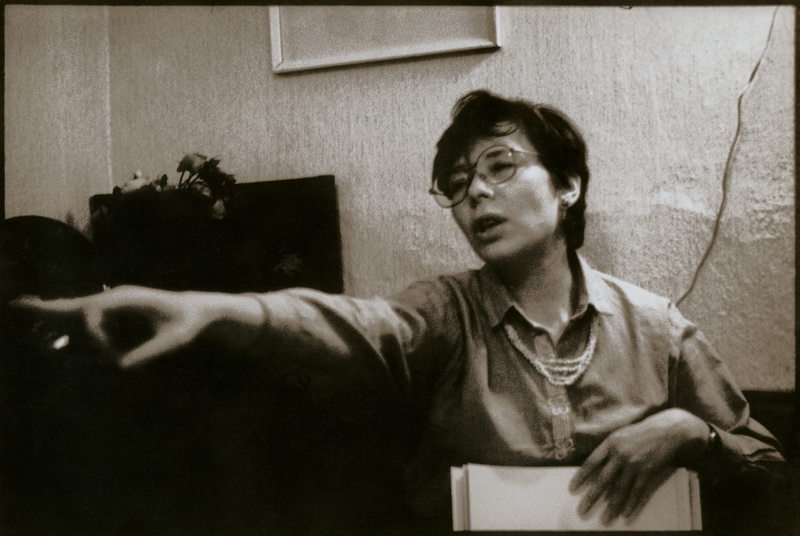
- Alchuk in 1995
- Born: March 28, 1955; Boshnyakovo, Russian SFSR, Soviet Union
- Died: March 21, 2008 (aged 52); Berlin, Germany
- Occupations: Poet and visual artist
- Movement: Moscow Conceptualists

Anna Alchuk (28 March 1955 – 21 March 2008) was a Russian poet and visual artist. An admirer summarized her work as "a free-spirited romp across complex and significant ideas about personhood, identity, representation, linguistic performance, and political action."

She was married for 33 years to the philosopher Michail Ryklin. At the time of her death the couple were living in Berlin where Ryklin was employed as a visiting professor at the university. The assessment that Alchuk's death had been a suicide was generally accepted, but did not go entirely unquestioned.

Anna Alchuk was the name under which she worked as an artist, and by which she is identified in many English language sources. However, fuller variants of her name are also used in some sources.

== Life ==
Anna Alchuk Mikhalchuk (А́нна Алекса́ндровна Михальчу́к) was born into a Jewish family in Bosjnjakovo in the Sakhalin Oblast in the Soviet Far East. Her parents were working on Sakhalin as geologists. Anna grew up in another rich mining region, in Vorkuta in the North Urals. She identified with her grandmother whom she never met, since the old lady spent the last thirty years of her life locked away in a psychiatric institution.

In 1973 she met Michail Ryklin whom she married in 1975. While Ryklin worked for his doctorate which focused on Claude Lévi-Strauss and Jean-Jacques Rousseau, between 1973 and 1978 Alchuk studied History at Lomonosov University (as Moscow's principal university was known at that time). During the build-up to the Dissolution of the Soviet Union, in 1987 and 1988 she was a co-publisher of the samizdat publications "Paradigma" ("Парадигма") and "MDP" ("МДП"). In 1983 Alchuk's mother, Maja Koljada, had been denounced and accused of "spreading untrue facts, contrary to better knowledge, which denigrate the Soviet state and social system". Koljada had been sent away to a labour camp hundreds of kilometers away from her family.

Towards the end of the 1980s she got together with a group of Moscow artists and conceptualist poets, to take part in the exhibitions of the new conceptual art movement. Later she participated in music and poetry stage performances, for instance with the cult musician Sergey Letov and the Three-O group. Her own first volume of poetry was published in 1994. During this period she was the organiser of numerous exhibitions and performances in which music and poetry were combined.

Alchuk was a member of the Russian section of PEN International and of the Academy of Zaum. Her poems and visual works were reproduced in Draft (almanac) (a Russian language literary almanac published annually in New York) and New Literary Review. Her essays and articles featured in leading Russian journals, including Foreign Literature. She was the editor-compiler of a collection of articles entitled "Женщина и визуальные знаки" ("Woman and visual signs") which appeared in 2000. During the final years of the twentieth century, hers became an increasingly international presence in the contemporary arts world, featuring in exhibitions not just in Russia, but also in Britain, Germany, Hungary and Sweden.

Life turned bitter early in 2003. In January an exhibition opened in Moscow under the challenging title Watch out: Religion. The focus of the exhibition was on the church. A few days after it opened, on 18 January, the exhibition was trashed by six people purporting to represent Christian Orthodox believers. The works of the 40 exhibitors were destroyed with paint. A statement appeared on the wall: "May you be damned". Two of the vandals, Lyukshin and Zyakin, were arrested at the scene and a criminal trial took place. What appalled many in Russia and, as news of the trial spread, many international observers, was that the authorities proceeded not against the vandals but against the exhibition organisers, Yuri Samodurov and Ludmila Vasilovskaya. A third person was on trial, one of the more high-profile exhibitors, Anna Alchuk Mikhalchuk. (On 23 August 2003 a Moscow court determined that Lyukshin and Zyakin had no case to answer.)

"In an authoritarian social climate, a person who is declared guilty begins slowly but surely to think of himself as guilty. He internalizes the guilt, not because all others around him are convinced of his guilt (he has friends, even if they can no longer offer their help), but because he was charged as guilty by an authority which speaks in the name of everyone. And so everyone, regardless of whether they think the smear victim is guilty or not, will behave towards him as if his guilt had been long established. The chosen scapegoat begins, with time, to inscribe the guilt into his own body."

Michail Ryklin, translated and quoted by Stephanie Sandler

The lengthy trial and the events surrounding it hit Alchuk badly. Her husband was able to chronicle their experiences. Overnight their circle of friends halved in size. They were avoided. Alchuk found herself identified in the Russian press not as an adventurous artist and lyric poet but as a political figurehead of opposition. There was no protection offered from the constant anonymous threats, many of which were couched in nationalist and anti-semitic terms. The experience of social isolation and the growing belief that if the authorities said she was guilty of something then she must be, tore away at her self-image. It was the start of a long period of destabilisation. (The outcome of the trial was that Samodurov and Vasilovskaya were found guilty of inciting religious and ethic hostility under Article 282 of the Criminal Code. Each was fined one thousand rubles. Alchuk was found "not guilty" and acquitted.)

"After her tragic death, my wife was described by many foreign journalists as a "Putin critic". I doubt that the name Putin appears in anything she has ever written. She had no interest in politics. But when politics forced its way into our space and started to destroy it, when things were taken away from us that shortly beforehand had seemed to belong to us, my wife, myself and other (sadly only a few) intellectuals who defended their language and their right to artistic expression, were suddenly labelled "Putin critics" .... Anna Alchuk's diary of dreams shows that being a "Putin critic" is a life-threatening occupation. She lived in constant fear of my life and her own. "

Michail Ryklin, translation from German by Nick Treuherz and lp.

Constant threats by telephone and by letter continued: the threats were mostly of violence. Leaving the house became an ordeal. There were online death threats. The murder of Anna Politkovskaya shook her badly. Michail Ryklin later wrote, "Once acquitted by the court, she saw herself facing a community for whom the things for which she had fought and made sacrifices (initially it almost seemed and if this was about a common call for freedom of artistic expression) had completely lost their meaning. Over these years the art scene resigned itself to its defeat and even managed to profit considerably as a result. It was, it transpired, far easier to endure being a target of religious fanatics than having to put up with the repressive passivity of most of her fellow artists." Meanwhile, her daughter and grandchild in Moscow waited in vain for Alchuk to call. Over the next few years Ryklin and Alchuk concluded that they no longer had a future in Moscow. In November 2007 they moved to Berlin: Michail Ryklin accepted a post as a visiting professor at the Humboldt University.

== Death ==
On March 21, 2008 Alchuk left the couple's Berlin apartment, telling her husband she was going to the shops to buy washing powder. It was a public holiday and the shops would be closed, but Ryklin, his nose in a book, did not register that till later. It was wet, cold and windy and she was dressed appropriately. Three hours later he noticed she had left her mobile phone behind. Three weeks later, on 12 April, he was visited by two detectives. A body had been found in the Spree. He recognised the wedding ring when he was shown a photograph of it. Stones had been found in the coat pockets, together with a water-damaged picture of Manjushri. (The couple shared an interest in Buddhism.) Blood tests indicated a sleeping drug intake twenty times the doze conventionally prescribed for insomnia. The larynx was damaged. There was a puncture on the right side of the body with a broken needle in it. A hat had been drawn down firmly over the forehead and eyes.

The day after his wife disappeared Michail Ryklin shared some ideas with the investigating authorities in a letter. He urged them to take more seriously the possibility that there might be a political aspect to her disappearance: "Through her critical engagement with Russian society, and because of her Jewish provenance, Mrs Mikhalchuk was exposed to daily repression and threats of violence. Crimes of political violence against critics of the Russian government have increased massively in recent years. So you should not rule out a politically motivated or antisemitic crime in this case."

In 2014 Michail Ryklin published a book, described by one reviewer as "a record of grief and love", about his late wife. He had worked through police investigation reports of around 100 pages. He had worked through 27 numbered note books in which Anna, like most serious writers, had confided her thoughts and dreams, insights and, increasingly, her nightmares. He had discovered many things about Anna, about himself, and about their marriage, that he had not known before. One conclusion that he had quickly reached for himself was that, in an immediate sense, his wife's death had indeed been a suicide.
