= Narodny Sobor =

Narodny Sobor Народный собор
- Leader: Vladimir Khomyakov; Oleg Kassin
- Founded: 8 October 2005; 21 years ago
- Headquarters: Moscow, Russia
- Newspaper: Narodny Sobor, New Generation
- Ideology: Orthodox nationalism Russian nationalism Orthodox traditionalism Homophobia; Islamophobia; Antisemitism; Anti-Immigration; Xenophobia; Clericalism; Anti-Americanism
- Political position: Far-right
- Religion: Russian Orthodox Church
- Colours: White; Black; Gold
- Slogan: «Together — for one!» (Russian: "Вместе — за одно!»)

Party flag

Website
- narodsobor.ru

The All-Russian Social Movement "Narodny Sobor" (Russian: Народный Собор; Narodnyy Sobor) (Russian for "People's Council") is a Russian ultranationalist social movement based on the ideas of national patriotism and orthodoxy and declared protecting of public morality and traditional family values.

The Narodny Sobor, which opposes the promotion of homosexuality, became famous, in particular, for its protests against the concerts of the Madonna, who supports the LGBT community, as well as for its lawsuit, which almost ended in prison for curators of the "Forbidden Art" exhibition of Yuri Samodurov and Andrei Erofeev. In 2003, after another exhibition "Beware, Religion!" activists of the Narodny Sobor smashed the Sakharov Center, and in May 2012 they picketed the exhibition of Marat Gelman "Rodina".

== Structure and leadership ==
The movement includes more than 250 minor public organizations and associations (created mostly by the same people).

=== Co-chairs ===
- Vladimir Evgenievich Khomyakov
- Oleg Yurievich Kassin

=== Coordinators ===
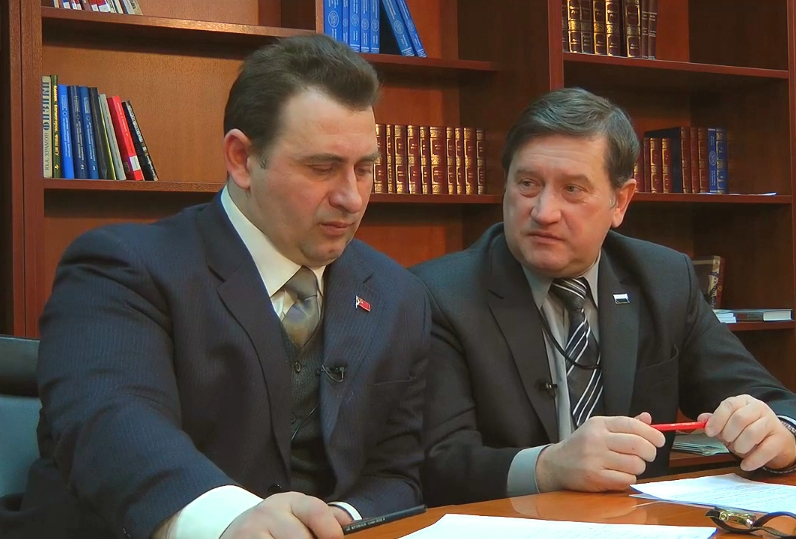
Maxim Kalashnikov (left) and Vladimir Khomyakov, Chairman of the Central Council of the Narodny Sobor movement, on the air of the National Question program, February 25, 2011

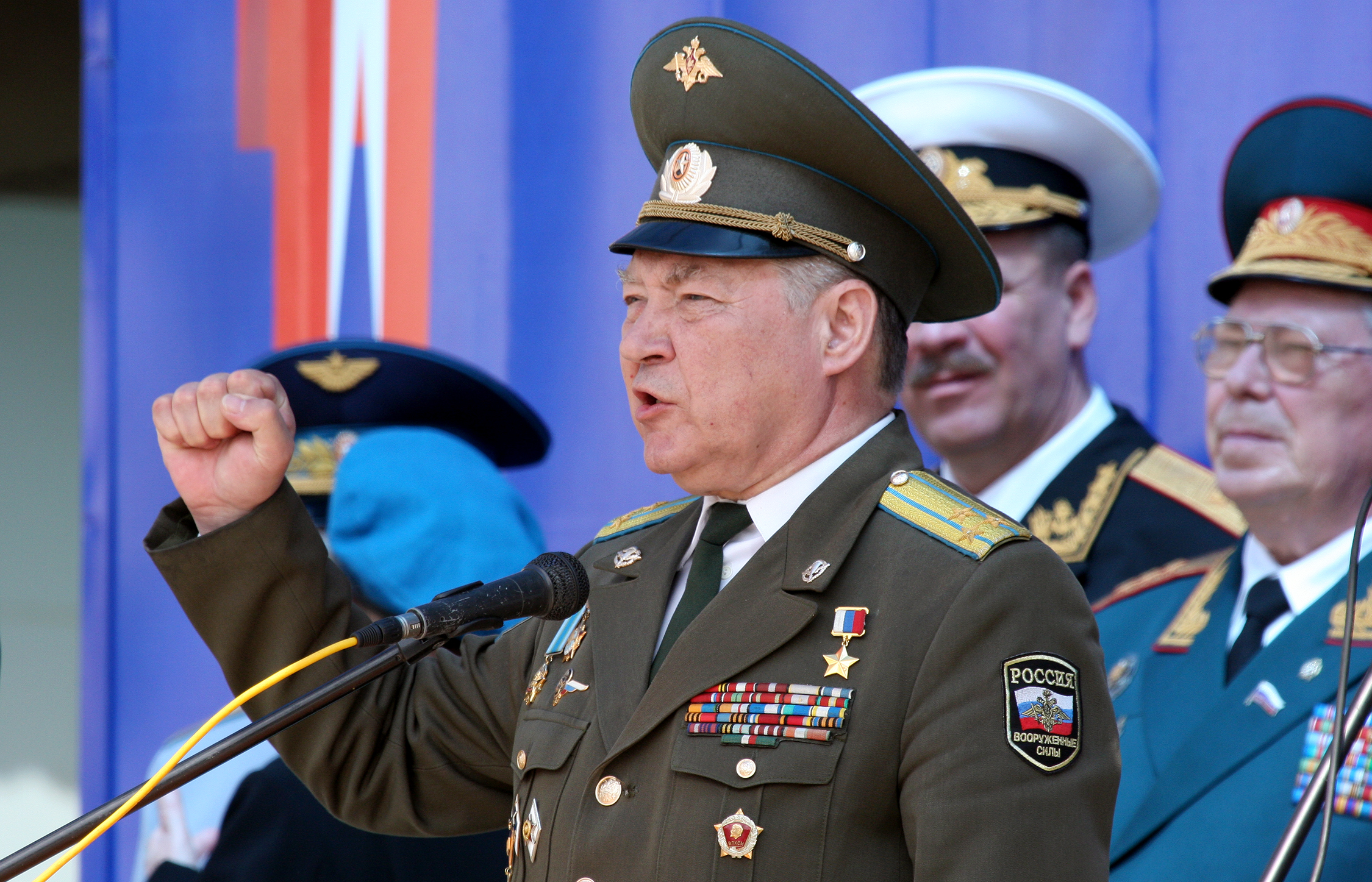

The honorary coordinators of the Narodny Sobor and members of the Central Council are:

- Alexander Krutov, President of the International Fund for Slavic Written Language and Culture, editor-in-chief of the "Russian House" magazine;
- Alexander Soluyanov, Hero of the Soviet Union, Major General of the VDV;
- Alexander Margelov, Hero of the Russian Federation, President of the Fund for Assistance to the VDV named after Army general Vasily Margelov, son of the legendary creator of modern airborne forces;
- Vladimir Krupin, co-chairman of the Writers' Union of Russia;
- Anatoly Greshnevikov, Deputy of the State Duma of the 1-5 convocations;
- Nikolai Burlyayev, President of the International Film Forum "Golden Knight", People's Artist of Russia;
- Maxim Kalashnikov (Vladimir Kucherenko), futurist writer;
- Boris Vinogradov, Deputy of the State Duma of the 4th convocation, Deputy Minister of Education from 1998 to 2002;
- Alla Borodina, author-developer of the course "Fundamentals of Orthodox Culture", candidate of pedagogical sciences.

== Ideology ==
The Narodny Sobor aims to transform Russia on the basis of "the traditional spiritual and moral values of the Russian civilization".

The Narodny Sobor opposes "Russophobia", "uncontrolled immigration", "totalitarian sects", gay pride parades and any other actions "aimed at undermining the country, its spiritual moral values and culture".

According to Mikhail Delyagin, "The Narodny Sobor ... practically stood at the forefront of the struggle of Russian society for the family, against the propaganda of various kinds of perversions: from sexual to political."

== Activities ==
According to the materials of the Office of the Federal Service for State Registration for the Novgorod Oblast, the Narodny Sobor movement in early 2013 worked to create a special wing to monitor and identify sects in Russia, designed to help law enforcement agencies in the fight against sectarianism. According to Cassin, the movement has enough specialists in the field of religious studies to work fruitfully in the fight against sects.

=== "Human rights protection" ===
The Narodny Sobor has secured the allocation of budgetary funds for the reconstruction of the Monument to Minin and Pozharsky in Moscow. He is one of the initiators of the reconstruction of the Strastnoy Monastery and the restoration of the Regiment's Cathedral of the Preobrazhensky Regiment - the first regiment of the Russian Guard. Seeks the return of the icon of the Savior Not Made by Hands to the Spasskaya Tower of the Moscow Kremlin, as well as the restoration of the two-headed eagle over the Spasskaya and other Kremlin towers.

Narodny Sobor organizes and conducts sports competitions and tournaments, youth military-patriotic gatherings.

The movement initiated the initiation of a number of criminal cases against:

- director of the Sakharov Center Yuri Samodurov and the head of the department of the latest trends of the State Tretyakov Gallery Andrei Erofeev on the fact that they held the exhibition "Forbidden Art - 2006" in 2006. On July 12, 2010, the Tagansky Court of Moscow found the organizers of the Forbidden Art 2006 exhibition, Yuri Samodurov and Andrei Erofeev, guilty of inciting religious hatred and sentenced them to pay a fine. The court ordered Yuri Samodurov to pay 200 thousand rubles, and Andrei Erofeev - 150 thousand rubles. On October 4, 2010, the Moscow City Court rejected the cassation appeal of Yuri Samodurov and Andrei Erofeev, recognizing the verdict to the exhibition organizers as legal.
- a group of feminists who staged an action in the Cathedral of Christ the Savior.

The movement initiated the start of prosecutorial inspections:

- of the circumstances of the issuance by the Ministry of Culture of rental certificates for the demonstration of films containing profanity, obscene and vulgar expressions of a sexual nature. At the request of the Narodny Sobor, a prosecutor's check was carried out, as a result of which 147 distribution certificates were withdrawn for films containing profanity.
- in connection with the exhibition "Apples are falling at the same time in different gardens", held in July at the center for contemporary art "Winzavod" for the presence of pornographic products at the exhibition.
- on the fact of the possible presence of corpus delicti in the actions of the art group "War", which organized an Action in the Biological Museum in winter 2008.

On April 17, 2008, the Narodny Sobor appealed to the authorities in defense of the Patriarchal Compound in Sokolniki.

On October 30, 2010 Narodny Sobor held a rally "For Russia without dirt" on Bolotnaya Square in Moscow. The main demand of the protesters was the introduction of a ban on gay pride parades in Russia. In total, the rally was attended by 2,000 people. The immediate reason for the rally was the decision of the European Court of Human Rights to declare illegal the decisions of the Moscow authorities to ban gay pride parades. And on the eve of the rally, "Rossiyskaya Gazeta" published an article by the President of the Constitutional Court of Russia Valery Zorkin "The Limit of Compliance", where he expressed the idea that Russia may not recognize some decisions of the ECHR, in particular with respect to gay pride parades.

On April 29, 2012, with the participation of members of the Narodny Sobor, a repetition of the provocation in the Cathedral of Christ the Savior was prevented.

=== Promotion of "Imperial Ribbon" ===
The Imperial ribbon is a small (about 45 cm long and 3.5 cm wide) ribbon in the colors of the Imperial flag - the black-yellow-white flag that was the official banner of the Russian Empire from 1856 to 1883. In the 1990s, the "Imperial Flag" became the flag of the Russian national movement. However, in addition to nationalists, it is also used by such movements as The Other Russia.

As conceived by the authors of the action, the imperial ribbon on clothes or a bag should become the identification mark of Russian nationalists. The action was successful: In autumn 2010, tens of thousands of ribbons were distributed. Imperial ribbons could be seen on many participants of the 2010 Russian march in Moscow and other cities.

=== Notable initiatives ===
- Religious procession "Memory of grateful descendants" (2012), dedicated to the 400th anniversary of the Great Victory of the People's Militia under the leadership of the Nizhny Novgorod zemstvo head Kuzma Minin and the voivode Dmitry Pozharsky.
- Initiation of the collection of signatures under an appeal to the Moscow City Duma deputies containing a request to the capital's parliamentarians to adopt a bill prohibiting the promotion of homosexuality (2012).

=== Editions of the movement ===
The movement publishes the newspaper Narodny Sobor, with a circulation of 100,000. From 2010 to 2012 the Moscow regional branch of the Narodny Sobor movement has been publishing the New Generation newspaper (circulation - 10,000 copies).

== Partner organizations ==
1. International Foundation for Slavic Literature and Culture
2. All-Russian Public Organization "AntiAlcohol Front"
3. All-Russian public organization of veterans "Combat Brotherhood"
4. All-Russian public movement "Business women of Russia"
5. International Cossack Economic Union
6. Organization of assistance to Orthodox and military-patriotic education "Styag"
7. International Union of Public Associations of Veterans of the Armed Forces and Law Enforcement Agencies
8. Imperial Russian Historical Society
9. Fund "Fundamentals of Orthodox Culture"
10. Movement in support of Orthodox orphanages and children's educational institutions "Pchyolki"
11. Foundation for Assistance to the Unification of the Russian People "Russians"
12. Political party "Great Russia"
13. Political party "Rodina: Common Sense"
14. Social and political movement of the social majority of Russia "YAR"
15. Interregional patriotic youth public movement "New Frontier"

== Books ==
- Movement "Narodny Sobor" will not change its name // АНН, 20.11.2007.
- Movement "Narodny Sobor" has acquired a patron saint // АНН, 14.02.2008.
- Orthodox activists outraged by copulating robots at TSUM // Metro International, 19.10.2011.
- A documentary film about the public movement Narodny Sobor
- "Narodny Sobor" and the Russian Orthodox Church have united to fight religious sects // Publishing agency «Echo of the North», 22.10.2011.
- Narodny Sobor: what unites us // Klub-SMI, 13.05.2011.
- Narodny Sobor - "Russian doctrine" of Aslambek Dudayev // SEP «Sozidatel», 25.05.2012.
- Narodny Sobor will take on an all-Russian character // Segodnya.ru, 06.12.2010.
- «Narodny Sobor» on the Russian People's Line
- "Narodny Sobor" reached a new level // km.ru, 19.05.2009.
- "Narodny Sobor" may soon appear in Ukraine // Russian Line, 25.11.2010.
- "Narodny Sobor": what unites us // Narodny Sobor, 16.05.2011.
- «A serious unification of all patriotic organizations for the good of Russia is necessary» // Russian Line, 06.12.2010.
- The interregional public movement "Narodny Sobor" was created // Pravaya.ru, 26.11.2007.
- Congress of the interregional public movement "Narodny Sobor" // Soyuz, 11.12.2010.
- Patriotic forces come together // Segodnya.ru, 23.08.2012.
- Kishkovsky, Sophia (July 9, 2010). "Art Trial Reveals Clash of Russian Cultures". The New York Times.
- «Narodny Sobor» Aimed at Struggling Corruption // «Spravedlivost» Social Law Portal, 18.05.2009.
- SHO uzatvorilo dohodu o spolupráci s hnutím Národný Sobor // SLOVENSKÉ HNUTIE OBRODY, 30.11.2010.
- Vitaliy Ignatiev Discussed Parameters of Cooperation with Leadership of «Narodny Sobor» Inter-Regional Public Movement // MFA of Transnistria, 05.10.2011.
