= Combatants of the war in Donbas =

The combatants of the war in Donbas included foreign and domestic forces.

As of February 2018, the number of southeastern army separatist forces was estimated at 31,000, of which 80% (25,000) were Donbas residents, 15% (≈5,000) were military contractors from Russia and other countries, and 3% (900–1,000) are regular Russian Armed Forces personnel. This ratio had changed significantly from previous years, with "the Russian command gradually filling the armies of the 'republics' with locals". since peaking in 2015.

== Separatist insurgents ==
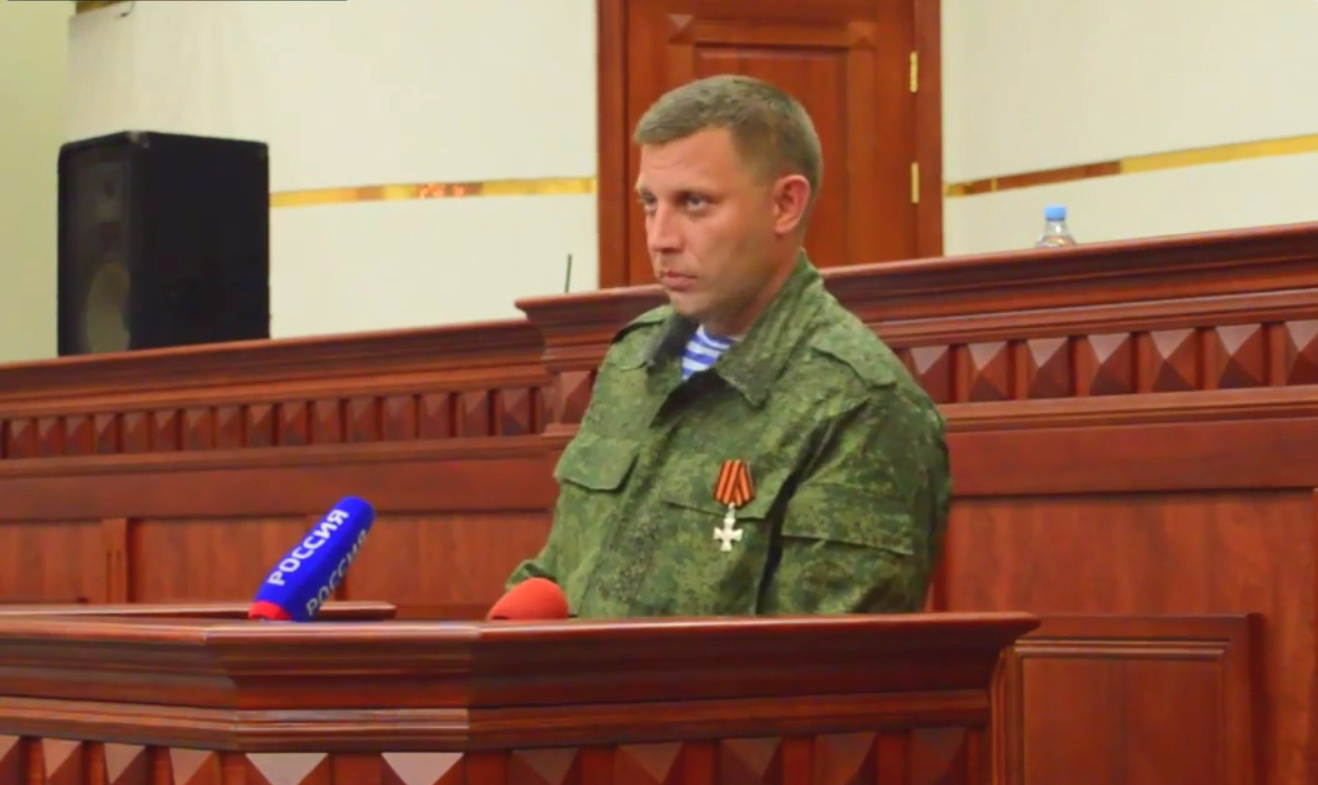
Alexander Zakharchenko takes an oath of office as the Prime Minister of the Donetsk People's Republic, 8 August 2014.

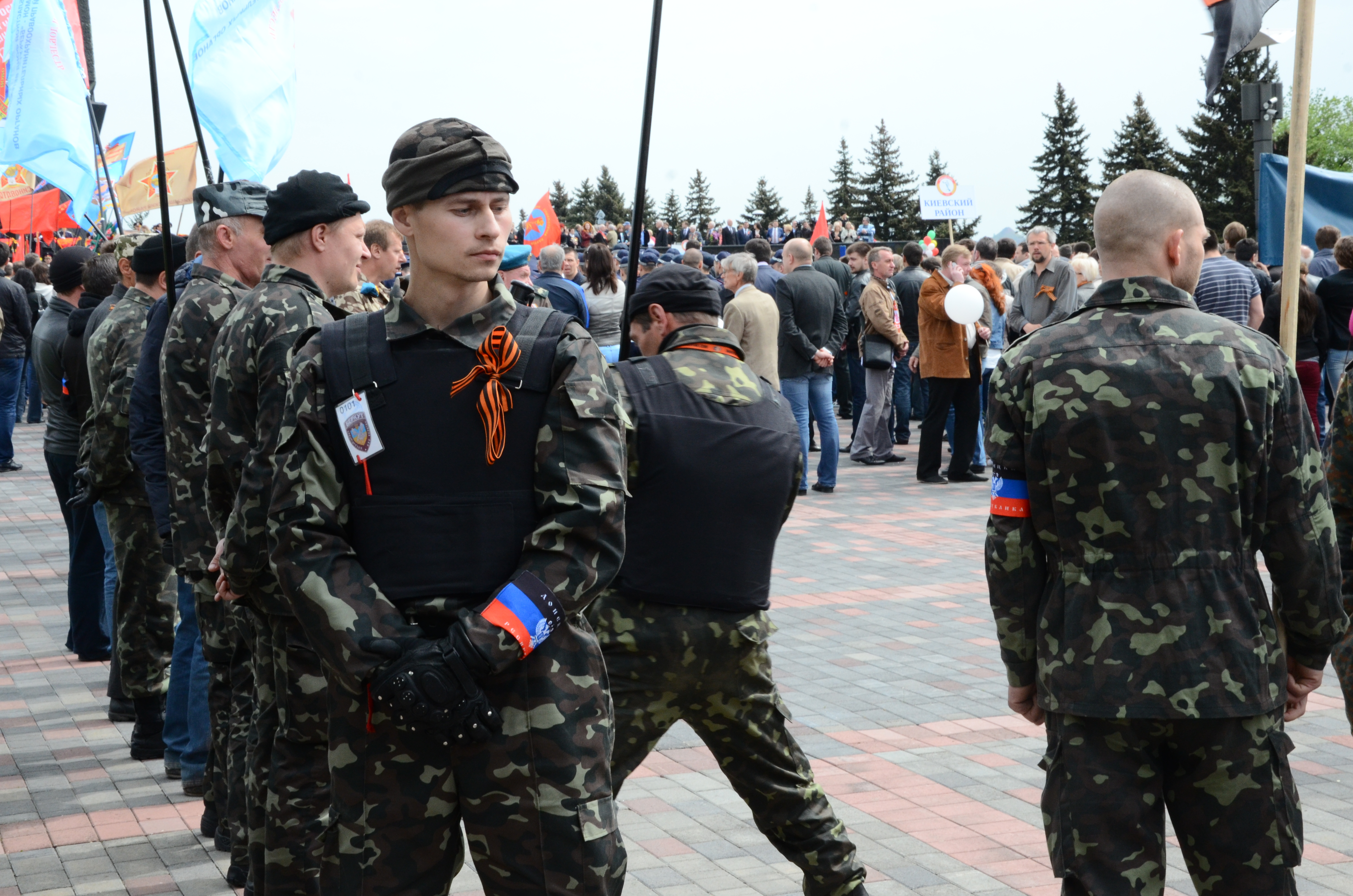
DPR Vostok Battalion members in Donetsk on Victory Day 2014

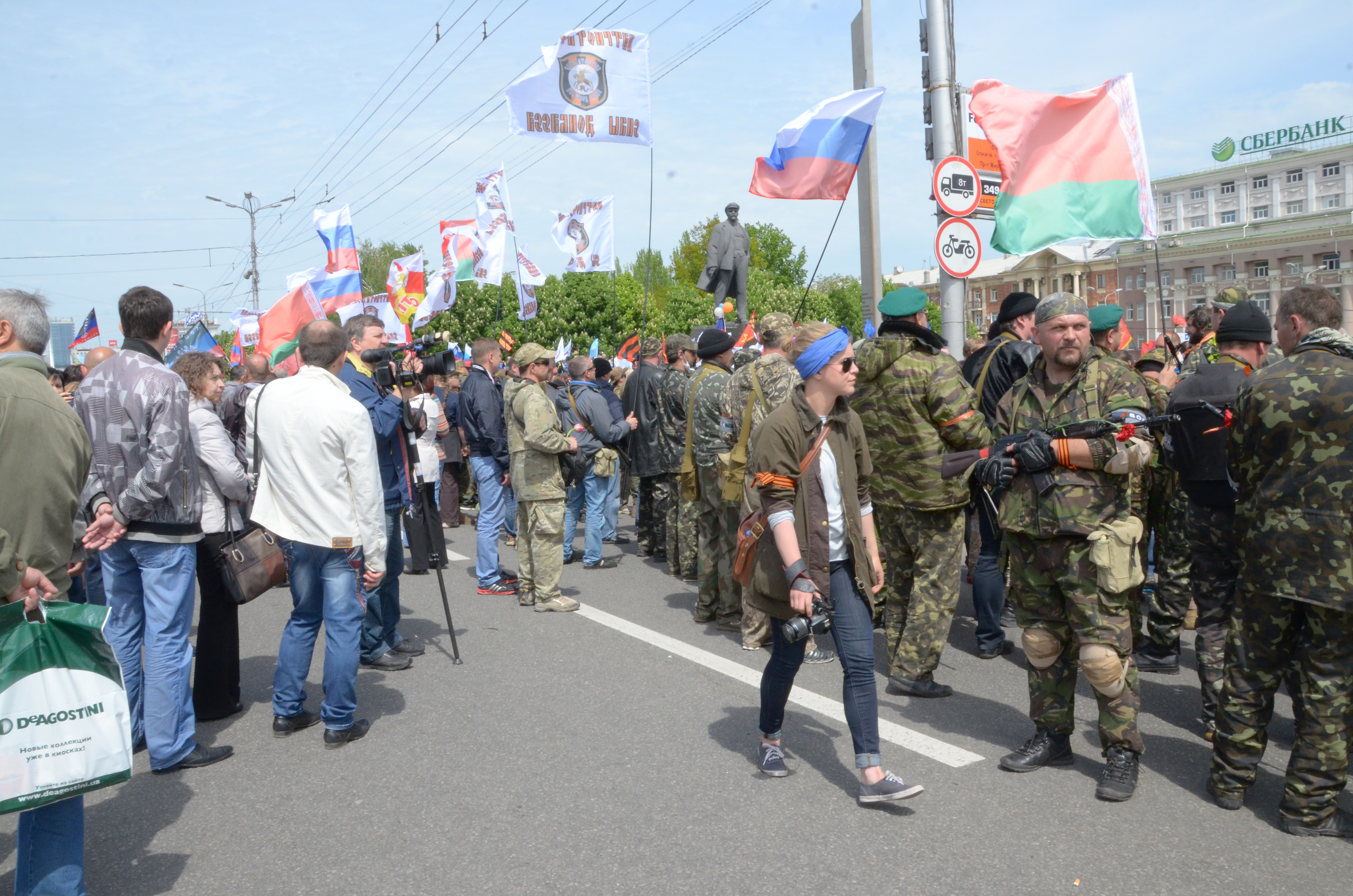
Vostok Battalion

=== Donbas People's Militia ===
Igor Girkin, a Russian citizen and FSB officer from Moscow who commanded the Donbas People's Militia in Sloviansk, initially denied Russian involvement in the insurgency. He said his unit was formed during the annexation of Crimea by the Russian Federation, and that two-thirds of its members were Ukrainian citizens. Girkin also said that the Sloviansk insurgents had agreed to work with the leadership of the Donetsk People's Republic, despite some conflict between insurgent groups. According to a spokesman for the Donetsk People's Republic, the militants that occupied Sloviansk were "an independent group...supporting the Donetsk protest", while insurgents in Sloviansk and Kramatorsk identified themselves as members of Pavel Gubarev's Donbas People's Militia. The group's forces at Sloviansk included some professional soldiers amongst their ranks, as well as retired veterans, civilians, and volunteers, while those in Donetsk have been confirmed to include former Berkut special police officers. When asked by The Sunday Telegraph where their weapons had come from, one veteran of the Soviet invasion of Afghanistan nodded at the Russian flag flying from the police station and said: "Look at that flag. You know which country that represents". An insurgent commander in Donetsk, Pavel Paramonov, told journalists he was from Tula Oblast in Russia. In Horlivka, police who defected were commanded by a retired Lieutenant Colonel of the Russian Army, later identified as Igor Bezler. Former Soviet military veteran Vyacheslav Ponomarev, who declared himself mayor of Sloviansk, said that he appealed to old military friends to take part in the militia: "When I called on my friends, practically all of whom are ex military, they came to our rescue, not only from Russia but also from Belarus, Kazakhstan and Moldova."

A former separatist militant corroborated these stories in an interview with Radio Free Europe. He said that fighters, including some Cossack units, arrived from Russia to support the separatists. Another interview with an insurgent from Saint Petersburg was published in Gazeta. He claimed to be fighting voluntarily as part of the Russian Imperial Movement.

In late July 2014, the local support for the militia within the city of Donetsk was estimated to be 70% by a local entrepreneur interviewed by Die Welt. Armed groups affiliated with the Luhansk People's Republic were merged with the Donbas People's Militia on 16 September to form the "United Armed Forces of Novorossiya".

=== Army of the South-East ===
The Army of the South-East (Russian: Армия Юго-Востока, Armiya Yugo-Vostoka) was a pro-Russian militant group that occupied various buildings in Luhansk Oblast. According to The Guardian, their personnel include former members of the disbanded Berkut special police. They were affiliated with the Luhansk People's Republic, but were merged with the Donbas People's Militia on 16 September to form the United Armed Forces of Novorossiya.

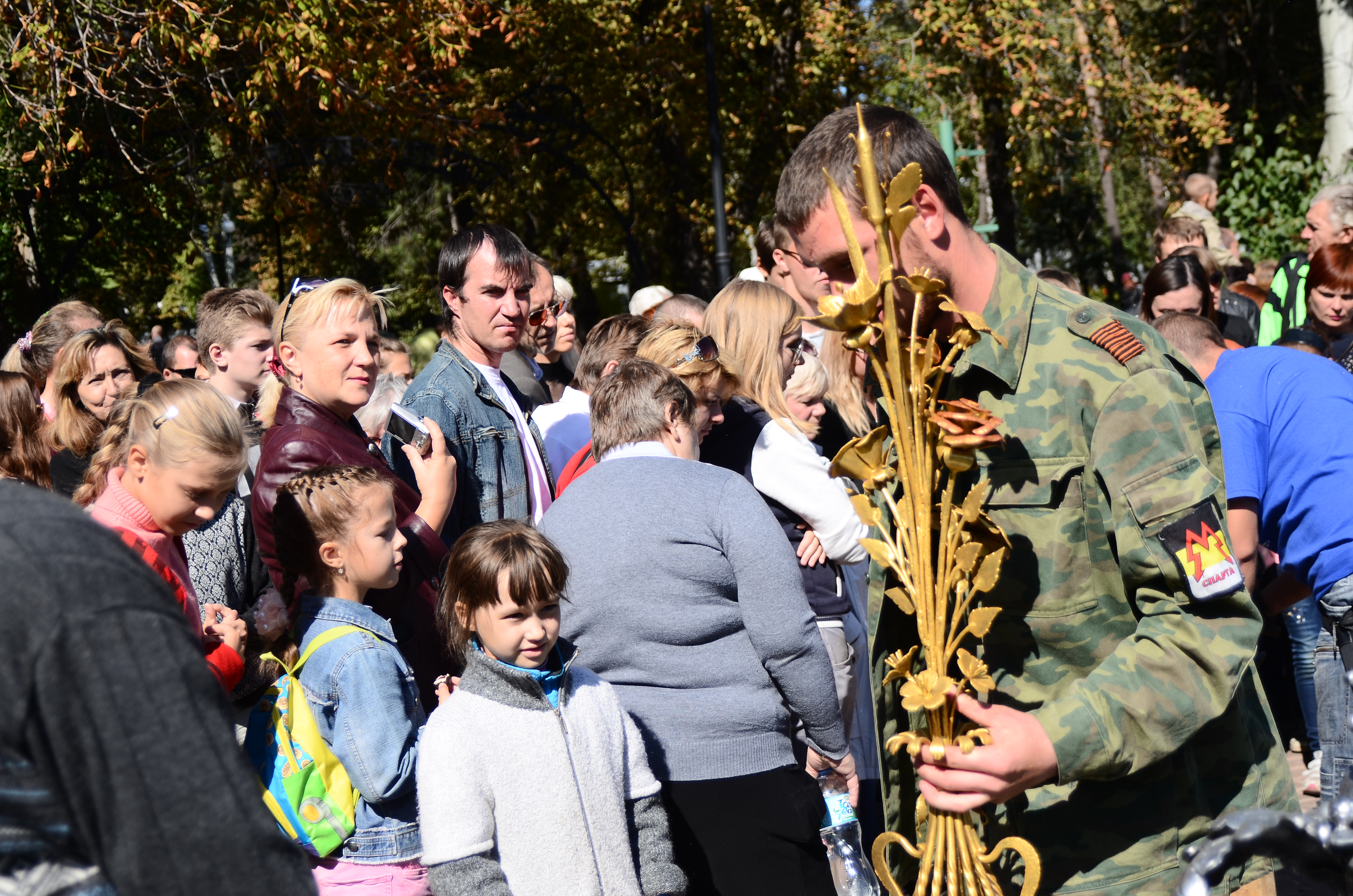
Rebel from the Sparta Battalion in Donetsk

=== Russian Orthodox Army ===
The Russian Orthodox Army (Russian: Русская православная армия, Russkaya pravoslavnaya armiya), a pro-Russian insurgent group in Ukraine, originated in May 2014 as part of the insurgency. It reportedly had 100 members at the time of its founding, including locals and Russian volunteers. As fighting between separatists and the Ukrainian government worsened in Donbas, membership rose to 350, and later to 4,000. Notable engagements of the ROA include the June 2014 skirmishes in Mariupol and Amvrosiivka Raion. The headquarters of the ROA is located in an occupied Security Service of Ukraine (SBU) building in Donetsk city. Members swore allegiance to Igor Girkin ("Strelkov"), insurgent and Minister of Defence of the self-declared Donetsk People's Republic. According to the Defence Ministry of Ukraine, the ROA has been in conflict with another pro-Russian militia, the Vostok Battalion, which accused the ROA of looting, and of avoiding combat.

=== Vostok Battalion ===
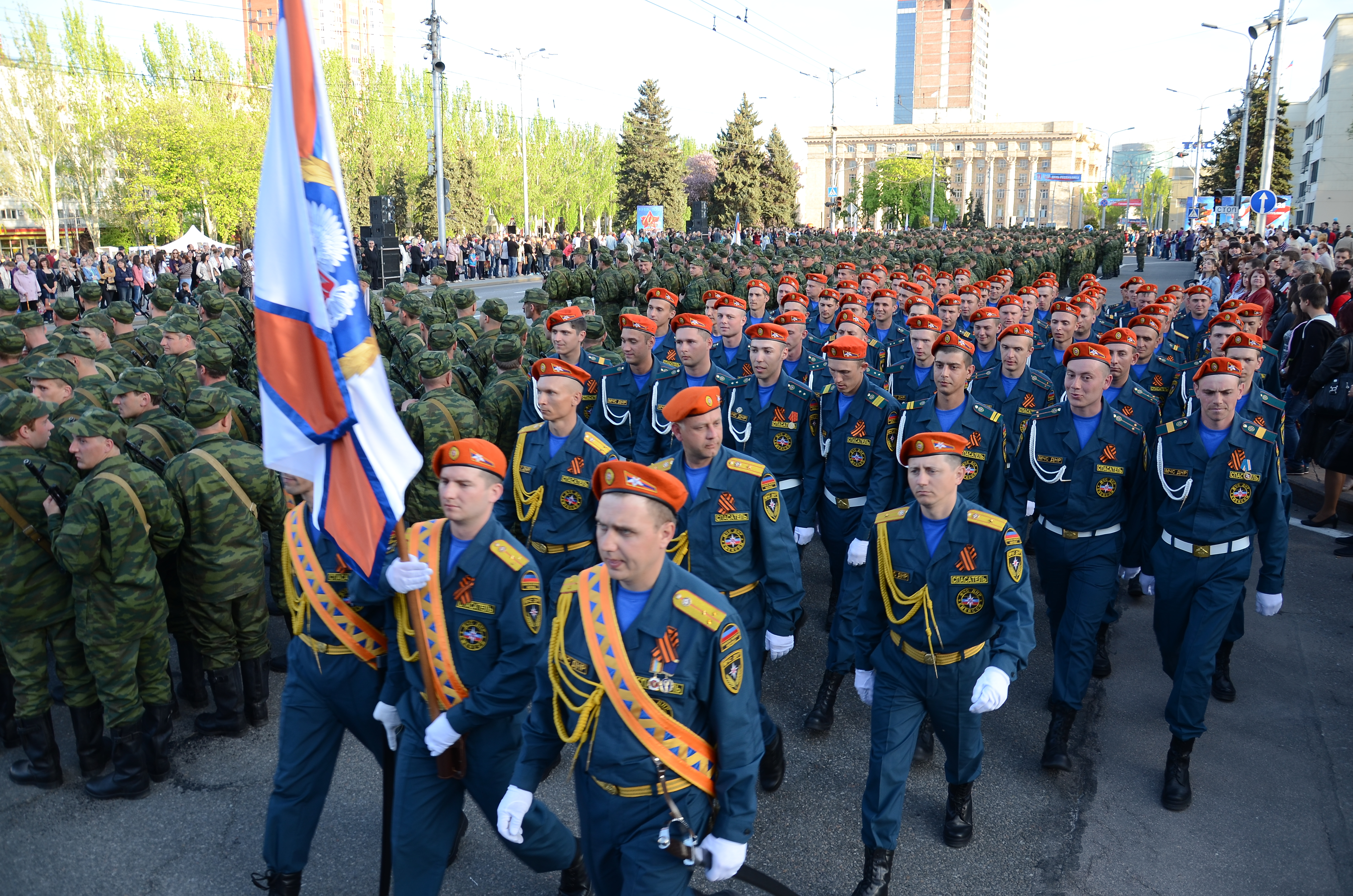
Rebel units during a Victory Day military parade in Donetsk

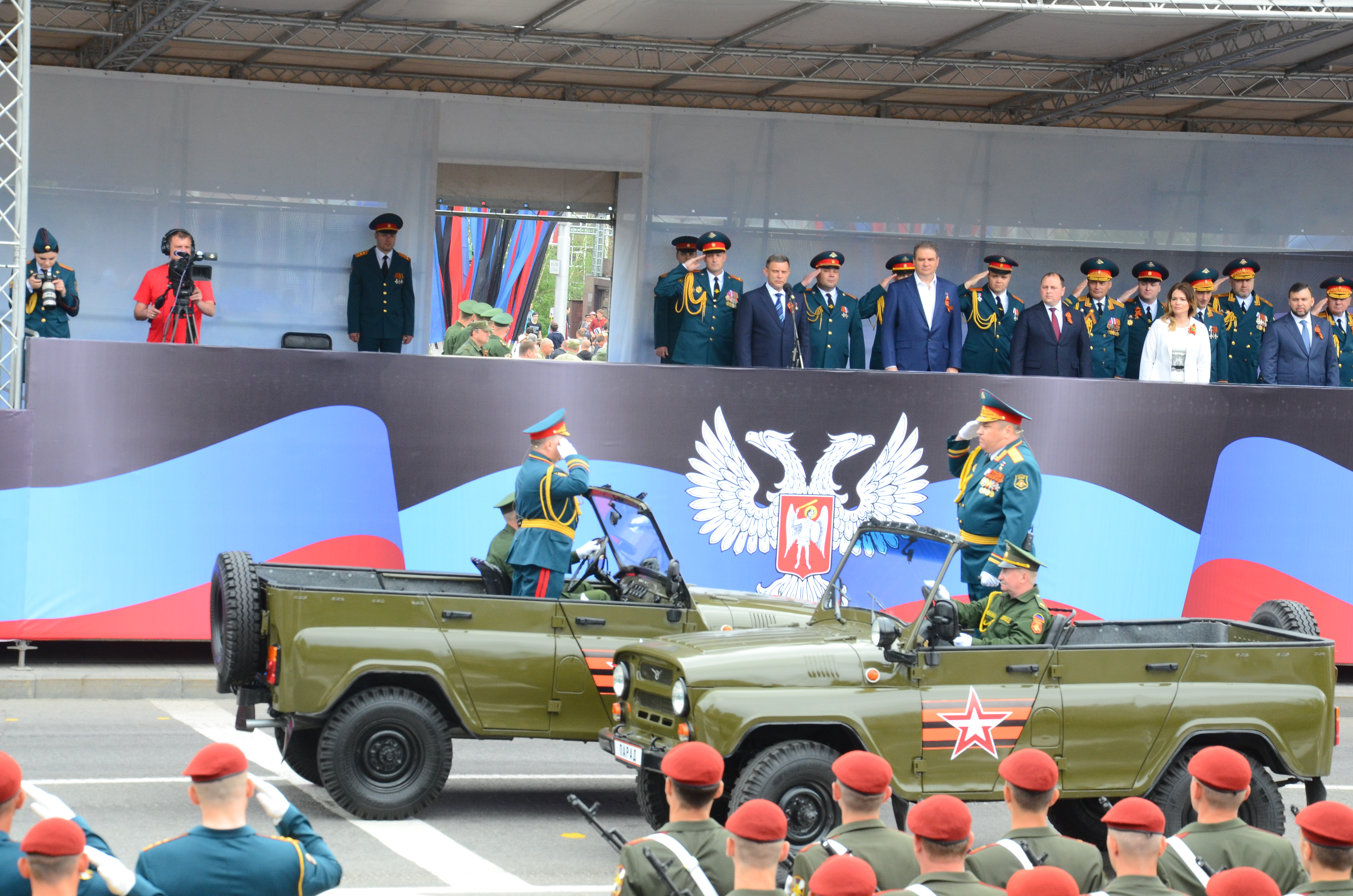
DPR leadership in Donetsk in 2018

The Vostok Battalion (Russian: Батальон Восток, Ukrainian: Батальйон Схід; lit. "East Battalion") was formed in early May 2014. It is commanded by Alexander Khodakovsky, a defector from the Security Service of Ukraine. Khodakovsky is the chief of the DPR's security service, and of the Patriotic Forces of Donbas, an insurgent battalion.

Khodakovsky said that the "overwhelming majority" of his men came from eastern Ukraine. According to the US government funded Radio Free Europe/Radio Liberty, Vostok reportedly includes former members of the original Vostok Battalion, a special forces unit of the Russian intelligence directorate (GRU) that participated in the Second Chechen and Russo-Georgian Wars. The original battalion was incorporated in 2009 into a Russian Defence Ministry reserve unit that is based in Chechnya. Khodakovsky said he had about 1,000 men at his disposal, and that more "volunteers" with experience in the Russian security sector were expected to join the battalion. A report by Radio Free Europe said that there were suspicions that the battalion was either created directly by the GRU, or that it was at least sanctioned by it. The battalion includes both fighters from Russia and from Ukraine. A BBC News report said that the battalion was composed largely of untrained locals from eastern Ukraine, with a smattering of Russian volunteers. Colombian and United States citizens have volunteered in Vostok battalion. A number of the Vostok insurgents were killed at the First Battle of Donetsk Airport. 30 bodies were repatriated to Russia after the fighting. Some of the members said they received salaries of 100 US dollars a week, though they maintained that were only volunteers. An Armenian volunteer in the unit said the battalion was composed of Slavs, and that roughly 80% of militants were from Russia.

By late February 2015, 110 members of the battalion had been killed and 172 wounded in the conflict.

=== Police and military defectors and deserters ===
In May 2014, the acting Ukrainian president Oleksandr Turchynov stated that numerous Ukrainian military and security personnel had joined the separatists, alongside stolen Ukrainian military equipment. In October 2014, Internal Affairs minister Arsen Avakov told journalists that about 15,000 Ukrainian policemen in Luhansk and Donetsk oblasts had defected to the separatists.

=== Foreign groups ===
==== Cossacks ====
Some identified maverick neo-Cossack volunteers, particularly Don Cossacks who live on both sides of the border, are participants in the war, along with some self-styled neo-Cossack groups. Several of these Cossacks formed a paramilitary unit called the 'Terek Wolves Sotnia', a reference to a detachment of White emigre Cossacks that fought against the Soviet Union during the Second World War. Prominent fighters include Alexander "Boogeyman" Mozhaev (a Russian military veteran from Belorechensk) and the unit's commander, Evgeny Ponomarev. Ponomarev was killed in August 2014.

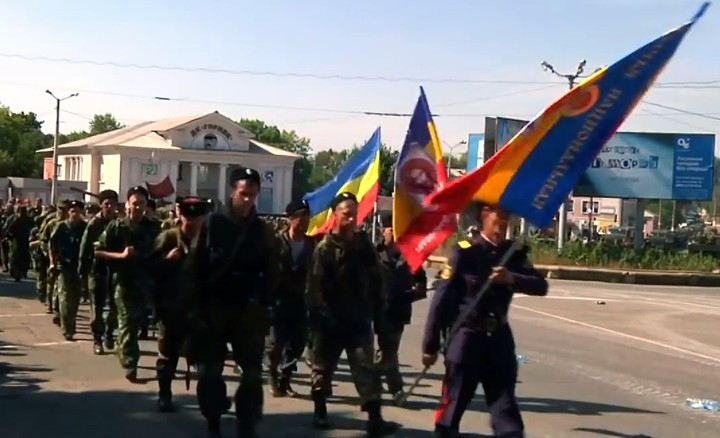
Don Cossack National Guard ceremonial parade in Perevalsk, 7 September 2014

Although Cossack units have been prohibited from crossing the Russian border into Ukraine en masse, it has been reported that Russian elements tacitly support the individual fighters in crossing the border into Ukraine. The Cossacks claim that it is their faith in Cossack brotherhood, Russian imperialism, and the Russian Orthodox Church that has driven them to take part in the insurgency with the aim of conquering what they perceive as "historically Russian lands." Mozhaev also stated that some of the more extreme views of the Cossacks include destroying "the Jew-Masons," who they claim have been "fomenting disorder all over the world" and "causing us, the common Orthodox Christian folk, to suffer." On 25 May, the SBU arrested 13 Russian Cossacks in Novoaidar Raion.

==== Caucasian and Central Asian armed groups ====
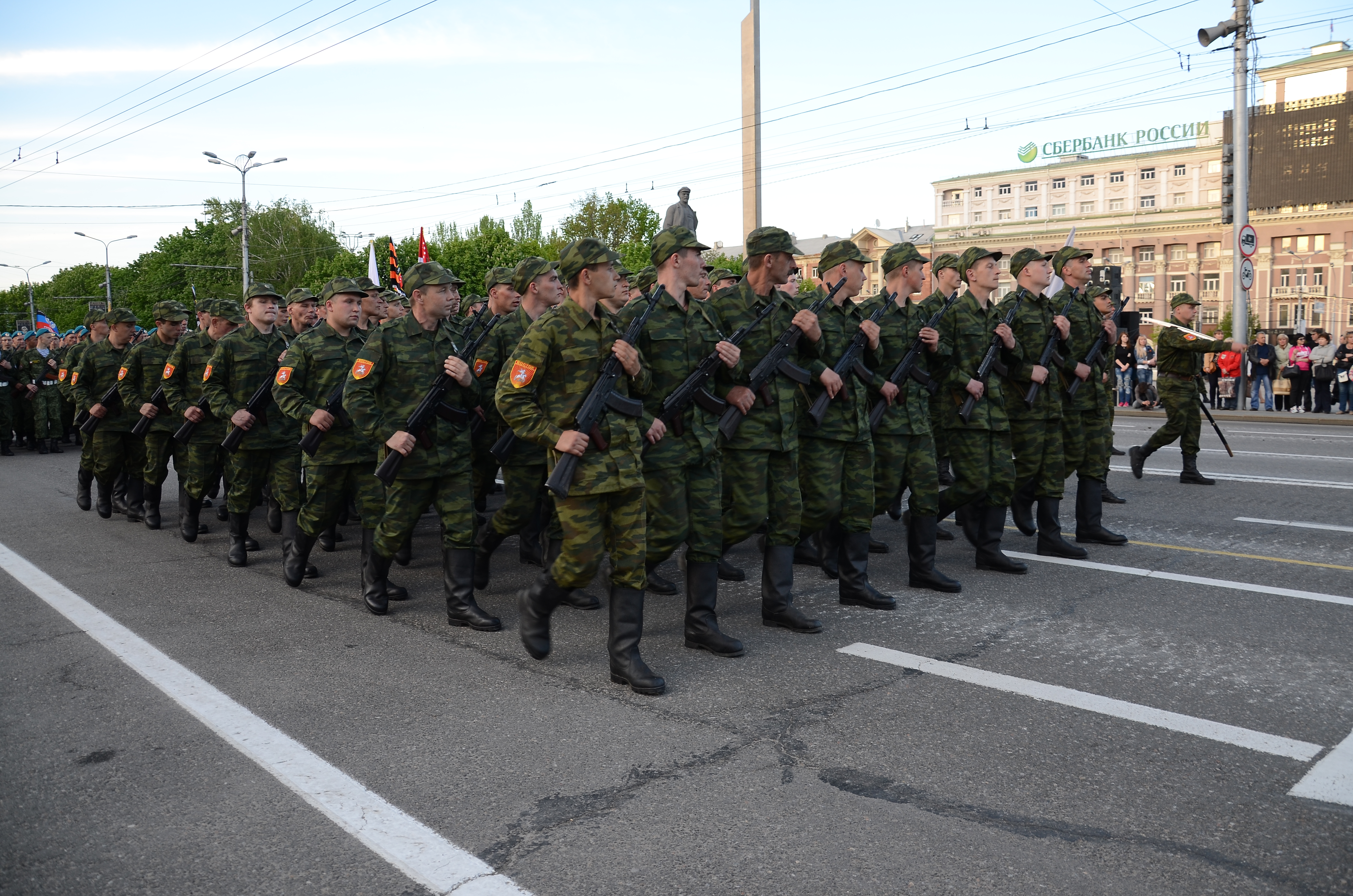
Vostok Brigade during the 2015 Victory Day Parade rehearsal

The Foreign Affairs ministry of Ukraine said that the presence of foreign soldiers amounted to "undisguised aggression" from Russia, and "the export of Russian terrorism to our country". "There are grounds to affirm that Russian terrorists funnelled on to the territory of Ukraine are being organised and financed through the direct control of the Kremlin and Russian special forces," the ministry said. To date, reports and interviews have shown the presence of Chechen, Ossetian, Tajik, Afghan, Armenian, and various Russian paramilitary forces operating in Ukraine.

===== Chechen paramilitaries =====
Chechen paramilitaries were spotted in Sloviansk on 5 May 2014. Chechen president Ramzan Kadyrov threatened on 7 May that he would "send tens of thousands of Chechen volunteers to southern and eastern Ukraine if the junta in Kiev continued its punitive operations." It was reported that Kadyrov engaged in an aggressive recruitment campaign in Chechnya for this operation, and that there were recruitment centres for it in Grozny, Achkhoy-Martan, Znamenskoye, and Gudermes. The Kavkazcenter, the official website of the North Caucasus Islamic insurgency, reported that Chechen authorities had opened recruiting offices for volunteers wishing to fight in Ukraine, and that those offices had suddenly closed. Five lorries crossed the Ukraine-Russia border carrying militants aboard on 24 May, with some reports suggesting among the militants were veteran Chechen soldiers. On the following day, the Vostok Battalion arrived in Donetsk in a convoy of eight lorries, each filled with 20 soldiers. Several of the soldiers looked Chechen, spoke the Chechen language, and said that they were from Chechnya. Two insurgents told CNN reporters that these were Chechen volunteers.

Ramzan Kadyrov denied knowledge of the presence Chechen troops in Ukraine, but a separatist commander later confirmed that Chechens and militants of other ethnicities fought for the Donetsk People's Republic People's Militia. In the aftermath of the First Battle of Donetsk Airport, local authorities said that some wounded militants were Chechens from Grozny and Gudermes. One Donetsk resident said that the presence of Chechen fighters showed "that this war is not clean. It is artificially created. If this is an uprising by the Donetsk People's Republic, what are foreigners doing here?"

Chechen militants interviewed by the Financial Times and Vice News said that they became involved in the conflict on the orders of the Chechen president. President Kadyrov strongly denied these reports on 1 June. In his statement, he said that there were "74,000 Chechens who are willing to go to bring order to the territory of Ukraine", and that he would not send them to Donetsk, but to Kyiv. As of May 2015, majority of previously pro-Russian Chechen paramilitaries exited the conflict, because of the two known incidents with Zakharchenko and his people, according to Akhmed Zakayev.

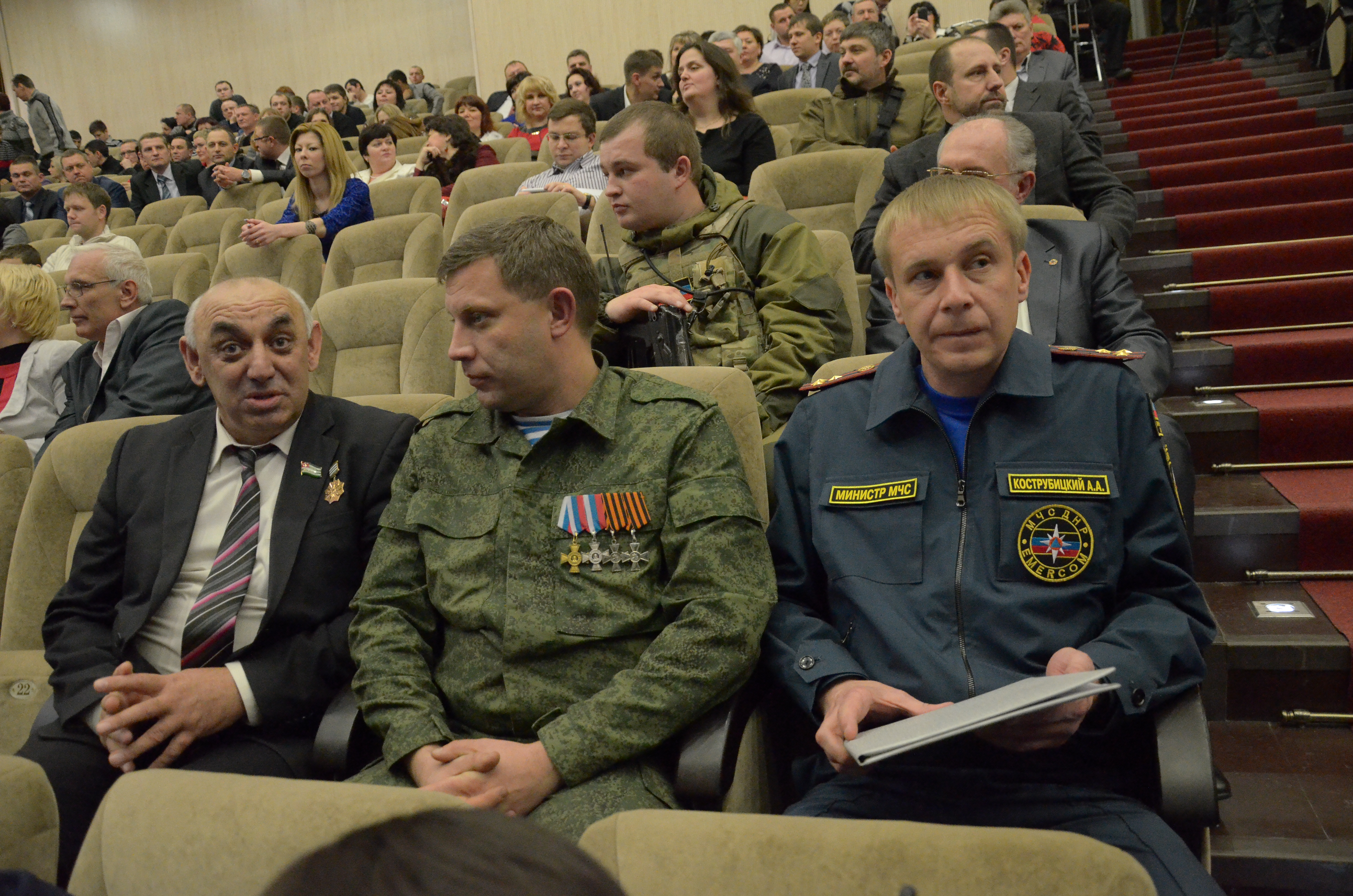
Zakharchenko and Fazlibei Avidzba, member of the People's Assembly of Abkhazia, Donetsk, 27 December 2014

===== Ossetian and Abkhaz paramilitaries =====
Starting on 4 May 2014, the United Ossetia Party and the Union of Paratroopers in the pro-Russian breakaway Republic of South Ossetia announced a recruitment drive meant to send veterans of the Georgian-Ossetian conflict to protect "the peaceful population of Ukraine's southeast". Some videos issued by an Ossetian militant group indicated that they were operating in Donetsk. Donbas insurgents interviewed on 27 May admitted that there were 16 fighters from Ossetia operating around Donetsk for at least two months prior. Head of the State Border Guard of Ukraine Mykola Lytvyn said that officials reports indicated the presence of Abkhaz militants as well. Militants from North and South Ossetia were open about their presence in Donbas in June. One militant named Oleg, part of the Vostok Battalion, told reporters "In 2008 they were killing us and the Russians saved us. I came here to pay my dues to them".

==== Serbian volunteers ====
In 2014, it was reported that at least 100 insurgent-affiliated Serbian volunteers are fighting in Ukraine. At that time, they had their own combat unit, named after Jovan Šević, including 45 members of the Chetnik movement, led by Bratislav Živković. According to media reports, by late 2017, this number fell to a few dozen. Serbian volunteer Dejan Berić has appeared in Russian media, which described him as a highly decorated soldier and hero; he has also figured as a member of the press at a press conference of Maria Zakharova in Moscow.

From late 2014 until late 2017 Serbia has opened 45 cases against Serbian mercenaries who had been fighting in the war in Donbas and in other military conflicts abroad. In August 2019, Serbian citizen Goran Chirich was placed under arrest by Russian Federation for "illegal crossing of border" from Donbas based on Interpol arrest warrant issued by Serbia, requesting his extradition. In May 2020 his appeal against extradition was denied by a court in Rostov-on-Don based on the fact that Chirich does not have Russian citizenship and so called "DPR passports" are not recognised even in Russia.

==== Volunteers from other countries ====
There are reports that volunteers from other countries, including France, Germany, the United States, Italy, Poland, Romania, Spain, and Turkey have fought on the insurgent side. Around 20 Hungarians have formed their own unit named Legion of Saint Stephen. In February 2015, Spanish police arrested eight Spaniards suspected of fighting alongside pro-Russian militants. Commenting on other foreign fighters, the suspects said that "They were paid neither travel expenses nor a salary, but they were received with open arms [...] We all want the same: social justice and the liberation of Russia from the Ukrainian invasion." The German newspaper Welt am Sonntag reported that more than 100 German citizens were fighting alongside pro-Russian militias in eastern Ukraine. Most of them were ethnic Germans from the former Soviet republics, and some had served in the Bundeswehr. According to the paper, a 33-year-old German citizen originally from Kazakhstan was killed in action by shrapnel during the battle of Debaltsevo, on 12 February 2015. Kazakhstan has given prison sentences of three to five years to its citizens who have fought for pro-Russian militias in Ukraine. In February 2016, Moldova stated that pro-Russian forces in Ukraine had recruited dozens of its citizens with the offer of money, with one individual saying he had been promised $3,000 a month. Two Moldovan mercenaries received three-year prison sentences and eight others were under investigation.

== Russian forces ==
While Russia denied its troops were operating in Ukraine between 2014 and 2022, OSCE observers have witnessed Russian troops operating in Ukraine identifying themselves as Russian servicemen. A paper released by the Royal United Services Institute estimated that 9,000–12,000 Russian troops had been deployed to parts of eastern Ukraine in early 2015, with 42,000 troops having been involved in the combined service rotation. On 17 December 2015 President Vladimir Putin stated in a response to a question about the detained Russian GRU agents held in Ukraine that Russia had "people (in Ukraine) who work on resolving various issues there, including in the military sphere." However, he went on to state "that doesn't mean there are regular Russian troops there." This was generally taken as an admission by Russia that its special forces were involved in the conflict. According to Russian former prime minister of the DNR Alexander Borodai, 50,000 Russian citizens had fought for separatist forces by mid 2015.

As of February 2018, the number of separatist forces were estimated at 31,000 out of which 80% (25,000) were Donbas residents, 15% (≈5,000) were military contractors from Russia and other countries and 3% (900–1,000) were regular Russian armed forces personnel. This proportion has significantly changed from earlier years, with "Russian command gradually filling up the military of the 'republics' with locals"; the primary driver being that salaries are no longer attractive for contractors from Russia, but highly attractive as stable source of income in economically impaired separatist territories. Regular soldiers in Donbas are offered anything from 15,000 and officers 25,000 RUB, while in the Russian army these respective earnings are 20,000 and 68,000 RUB. Russian forces still occupy most command positions as well as operate advanced weapons, such as electronic warfare units. In separate interviews given to Maksim Kalashikov in 2020, Igor Girkin and Pavel Gubarev openly admitted that the LDPR armed forces are only playing a role of "cover" for the regular armed forces of the Russian Federation, who are keeping the territories under Russian control.

OSCE monitors periodically record convoys of military trucks crossing through unmarked locations along the Russian-controlled border, usually overnight. OSCE statements and spot reports are criticised in Ukraine as they vaguely reports military "convoys leaving and entering Ukraine on dirt roads in the middle of the night, in areas where there is no official crossing" without explicitly mentioning Russian armed forces. OSCE monitoring frequently faces access restrictions and signal jamming of the monitoring UAVs. In 2021 OSCE reported that 62.5% long-range UAV flights "encountered GPS signal interference" with jamming so strong, it occasionally prevented UAV from even taking off. OSCE has on numerous occasions reported presence of Russian electronic warfare equipment in the separatist-controlled areas including specifically anti-UAV Repellent-1 systems.

After the full-scale invasion on Ukraine in 2022 a number of prominent LDPR activists started openly talking about involvement of Russian regular armed forces and GRU units described as "private military companies" since 2014. In 2023 interview Aleksander Khodakovsky described how in 2014 the Russian forces saved the separatist units from losing to Ukrainian army, noting that "it was not politically correct to discuss that involvement at that time" and helped expand their zone of control to Novoazovsk, Starobilsk, Telmanove and other regions.

=== Private military companies ===
Russia declaratively utilized private military companies (PMC) in the conflict, but as no such legal entity even exists in Russia law, these were usually controlled by FSB and GRU. Among the Russian PMCs operating in Eastern Ukraine, main actors were Wagner Group, MAR and E.N.O.T. Corp. Other include: RSB-Group, ATK-GROUP, Slavonic Corps Limited, Cossacks.

== Ukrainian forces ==
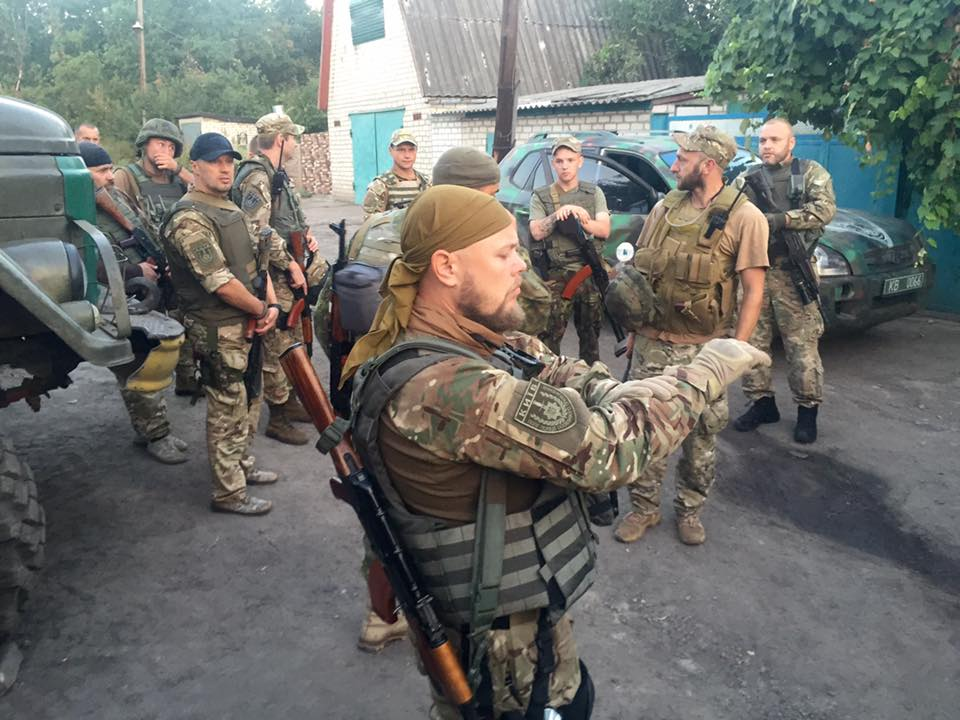
Ukrainian troops near Avdiivka

=== Armed Forces of Ukraine ===
The Armed Forces of Ukraine are the primary military force of Ukraine, and have taken a leading role in countering DPR and LPR forces. In 2014, the Armed Forces was said to be "in a disastrously impoverished state", and "had almost no training in confronting an internal land battle". It has been widely criticised for its poor equipment and inept leadership, forcing Internal Affairs Ministry forces like the National Guard and the territorial defence battalions to take on the brunt of the fighting in the first months of the war.

Following its independence from the Soviet Union in 1991, Ukraine inherited all Soviet military equipment and formations that had been stationed on its territory. Over the years preceding the start of hostilities in Donbas, the Armed Forces were systematically downsized, and became largely dilapidated. Soviet weaponry was not replaced or upgraded, leaving the Armed Forces with outdated and poorly maintained equipment. As an example, the Soviet military units never utilised ballistic vests, and hence, when the war in Donbas started, the Armed Forces of Ukraine had none. Whilst there is a vibrant defence industry in Ukraine, the equipment it produces is for export, and had not been used to equip the Armed Forces prior to the war. Amidst the annexation of Crimea by Russia on 11 March 2014, then Defence Minister Ihor Tenyukh said that "de facto only 6,000 [soldiers] are in combat readiness". According to a report by The Ukrainian Week, 90–95% of the Armed Forces' equipment in July 2014 was outdated or in poor repair. In addition, professional soldiers were in short supply, forcing conscripts and volunteers to fill battalions.

To counter equipment shortages, a powerful civil volunteer movement appeared. Teams of volunteers established crowdfunding centres that provide the soldiers with diverse support: from food and medicines to equipment like bulletproof vests, spaced armour, thermographic cameras and unmanned aerial vehicles. Other volunteers help the injured soldiers or search captives and the killed ones. Such volunteer centres work in all large cities and many small settlements of Ukraine, except those which aren't controlled by government.

In 2016, Ukraine was struggling to recruit conscript servicemen, due to significant evasion of conscription, to replace demobilising soldiers including volunteers. This followed negative publicity about nutrition and equipment deficiencies in the conflict zone. By mid-April 2016, 127,363 soldiers and volunteers had received veteran status.

By February 2018, the Ukrainian Armed Forces were larger and better equipped than ever before, numbering 200,000 active-service military personnel and most of the volunteer soldiers of the territorial defence battalions have been integrated into the official Ukrainian army.

=== National Guard of Ukraine ===
The National Guard of Ukraine was re-established on 13 March 2014, amidst rising tensions in Ukraine during the annexation of Crimea by the Russian Federation. It is a part of the Ministry of Internal Affairs. It was re-established to replace the Internal Troops of Ukraine, and is based on that force.

=== Ministry of Internal Affairs ===
The Ministry of Internal Affairs is commonly known as the militsiya, and is the primary police force in Ukraine. It is led by the Internal Affairs Minister, Arsen Avakov, a key figure in leading the counter-insurgency operations in the Donbas.

=== Security Service of Ukraine ===
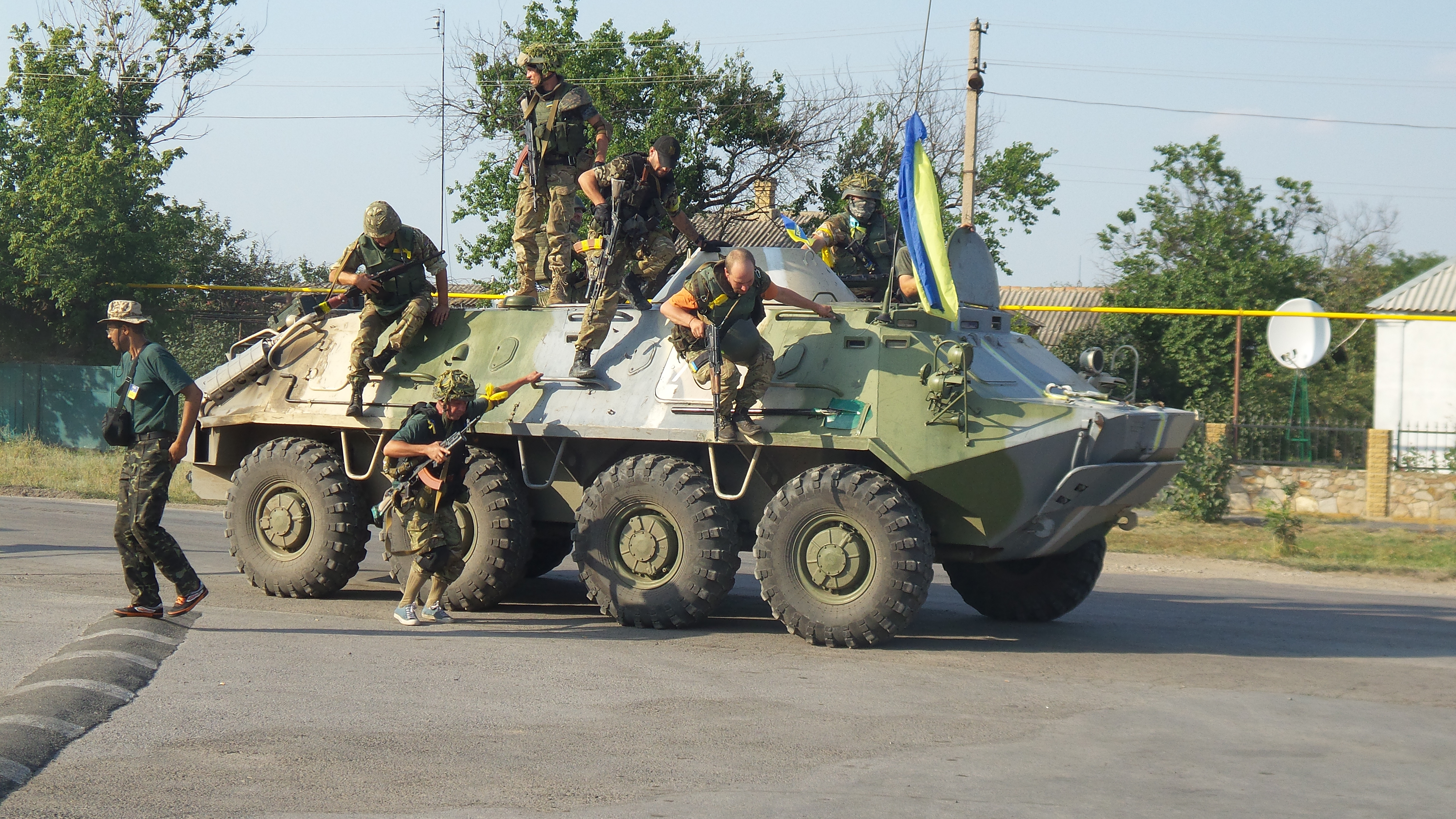
Donbas Battalion in Donetsk region, 9 August 2014

The government military operation to counter DPR and LPR forces in the Donbas is called the "Anti-Terrorist Operation" (ATO). It is led by the Anti-Terrorist Centre, a division of the Security Service of Ukraine (SBU). The SBU is the main intelligence service of Ukraine.

=== Pro-government paramilitaries ===
At least 50 pro-Ukrainian volunteer units have been formed and fought against the Donbas People's Militia and other insurgent groups. These forces include the Donbas Battalion, Azov Battalion, Kharkiv Battalion, and Oleh Lyashko's militia. Some of these units work under contract with the National Guard of Ukraine.

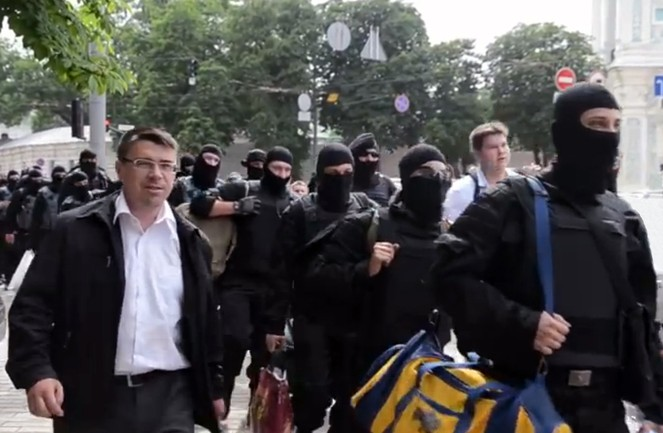
Azov Battalion volunteers in Kyiv, June 2014

These units took active participation in the military campaign. For example, the town of Shchastia in Luhansk Oblast was taken by the Aidar Battalion on 9 July, and Azov Battalion, together with other units, recaptured Mariupol from pro-Russian separatists forces in June 2014.

Some of the volunteer battalions belong to Right Sector. It lost 12 fighters when it was ambushed outside Donetsk in August 2014. Right Sector leader Dmytro Yarosh vowed his group would avenge the deaths.

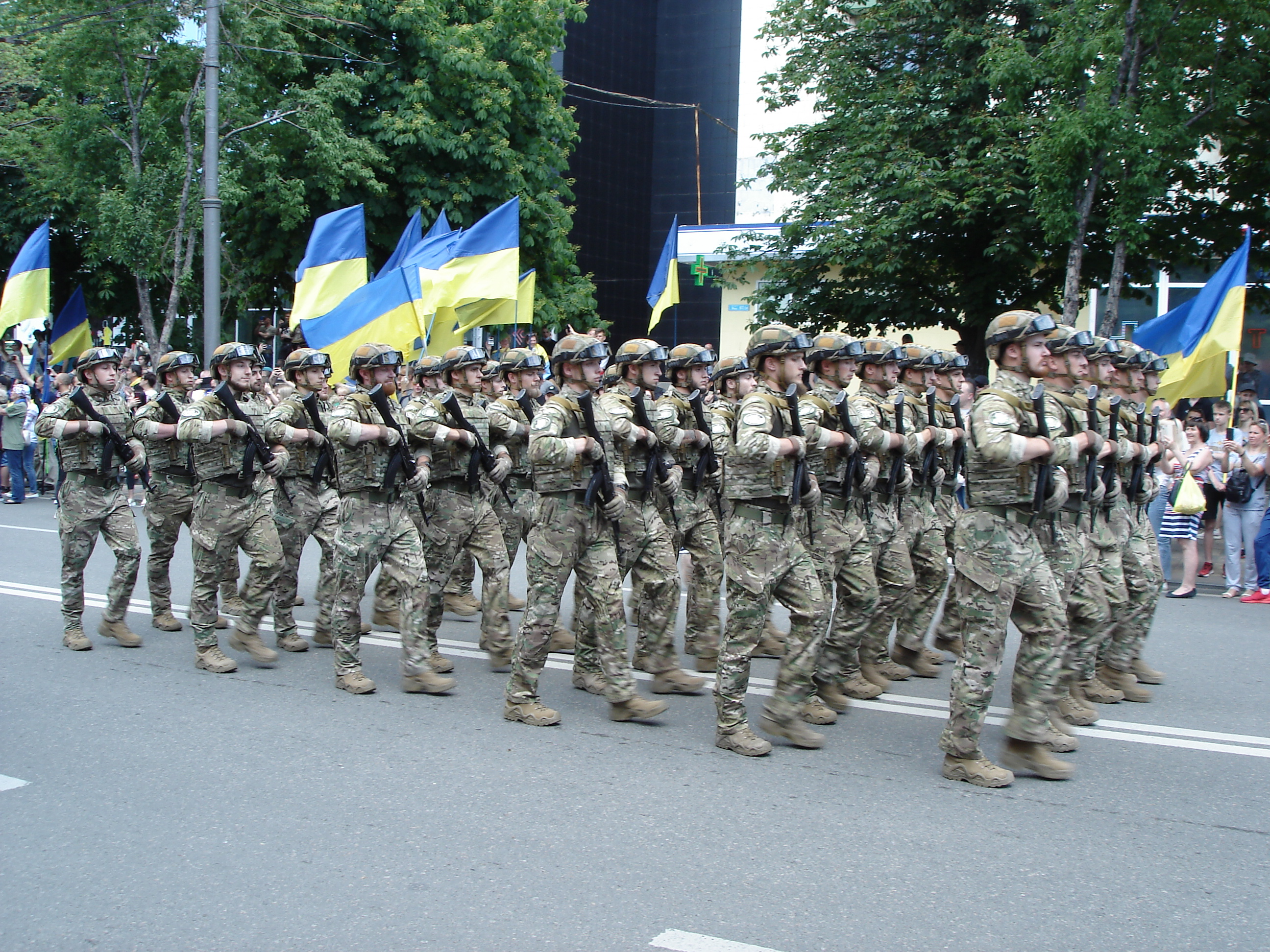
Azov Regiment at the parade in Mariupol, 2021

Foreign fighters mainly from Belarus, Georgia and Russia (about 100 men from each country) have joined the volunteer battalions, as well as volunteers from the United States, France, Germany, Norway, Sweden, Georgia, Poland, Spain, the Czech Republic, the United Kingdom, Croatia, Italy and Canada. The Foreign Ministry of Russia asked the governments of Sweden, Finland, the Baltic states, and France to conduct a thorough investigation into reports of mercenaries from their countries serving Ukrainian forces, following a story in the Italian newspaper Il Giornale.

Chechen opponents of the Russian government, including Chechen military commander Isa Munayev, were fighting pro-Russian separatists in Ukraine for the Ukrainian government.

At least three volunteer battalions composed mostly of people from the Caucasus and Central Asia are fighting against pro-Russian separatists. They include Muslims from states that were part of the Soviet Union, including Uzbeks, Balkars and Crimean Tatars.

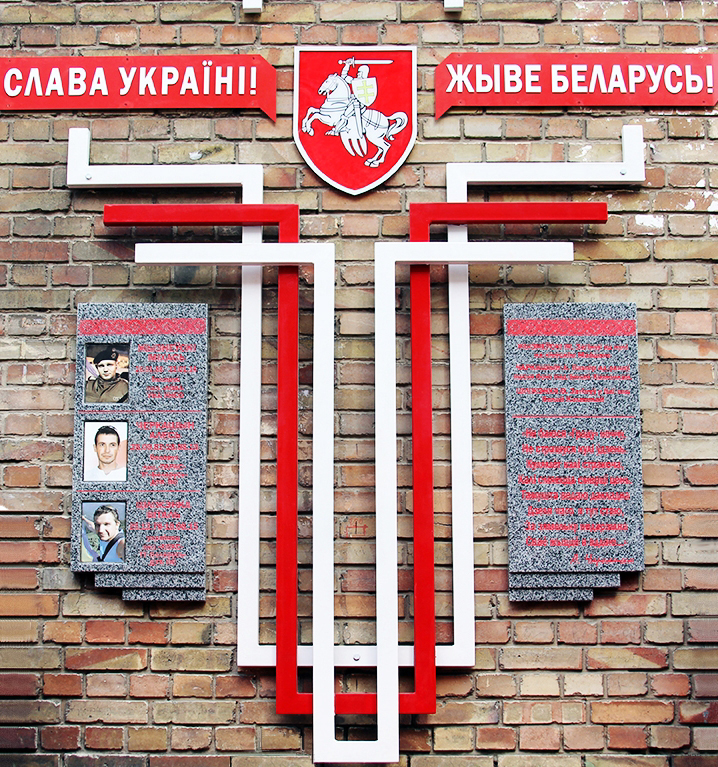
Monument to the Belarusians who died for Ukraine

Belarusian volunteers fighting on the side of Ukraine created the Tactical group "Belarus", as well as the "Pahonia" detachment, named after the old Belarusian coat of arms. On March 28, 2016, a Monument to the Belarusians who died for Ukraine was unveiled in Kyiv. It lists the names of Mykhailo Zhyznevsky, who died during the Euromaidan events, as well as Ales Cherkashin and Vitaly Tilizhenko, the dead volunteers of the Tactical group "Belarus". During the 2022 Russian invasion of Ukraine, Belarusian volunteers founded the Kastuś Kalinoŭski Battalion.

There are ongoing attempts by the Ukrainian Armed Forces to integrate volunteer battalions into the regular army and indeed many of the volunteers fighting in those groups were drafted into the army. The status of the remaining volunteer units remain legally ambiguous.

== See also ==
- Outline of the Russo-Ukrainian War
- Lists of active separatist movements
  - List of active separatist movements recognized by intergovernmental organizations
- List of historical separatist movements
- Ukrainian volunteer battalions
