= Lettre International =

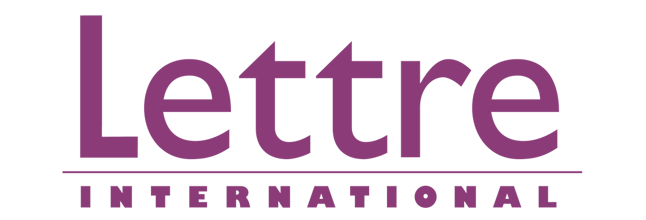
- Editor: Frank Berberich
- Frequency: Quarterly
- Founder: Antonín Jaroslav Liehm, Frank Berberich
- Founded: 1988
- Country: Germany
- Based in: Berlin
- Language: German
- Website: www.lettre.de
- ISSN: 0945-5167

Lettre International is the title of a number of cultural magazines published in various languages in Europe. The history of Lettre International dates back to 1984, the year that the original French edition (Lettre Internationale) first came out. Publication of the French magazine ceased in 1993. The corresponding German Lettre International, founded by Frank Berberich, has come out continuously since its inception in 1988.

== History ==
The original French edition was founded by Czech writer and scholar Antonín Jaroslav Liehm in Paris, 1984. This was followed by the establishment of an Italian edition, Lettera Internazionale (1985) and a Spanish one, Letra Internacional (1986). The German Lettre International was founded in 1988.

Shortly after the upheavals of 1989, intellectuals in Central and Eastern Europe joined the project and established editions of Lettre International in their respective languages. At most, Lettre International came out in twelve different versions at once, but some editions eventually ceased publication due to financial constraints and other circumstances. The French Lettre Internationale ceased publication in 1993. Lettre currently appears in German, Italian, Spanish, Hungarian, Romanian and, occasionally, in Danish language editions.

== Lettre International, Berlin ==
In 1988, the German Lettre International was founded in Berlin, by chief editor Frank Berberich. To begin with, Lettre International was published in cooperation with the Berlin daily newspaper, Die Tageszeitung, but has since the mid-1990 been the property of the independent Lettre International publishing company. The German edition comes out four times a year, with a circulation of 20,000 copies.

Each issue of the German edition is printed in tabloid format, roughly 10.6 inches wide by 14.6 inches tall. Every issue features 30 to 40 texts by different authors, the majority of which are translations, all of them first appearances in German. For each issue, Lettre International recruits a single visual artist to design the title page and up to ten pages of the magazine's middle section. Each issue also presents a freestanding six to eight page photo portfolio, consisting of a photo report, conceptual or essayistic photography.

=== Special issues ===
Issue 1, published in 1988, was printed and distributed in 100,000 copies.

Issue 31, published in winter 1995, was dedicated to the ongoing siege of Sarajevo, and titled Hommage à Sarajevo. The issue, which featured contributions from Jean Baudrillard, Susan Sontag and Heiner Müller, among 46 other authors, appeared in German and Serbo-Croatian simultaneously. The issue featured artworks from twelve artists, including Sophie Calle, Rebecca Horn, Annie Leibovitz and Lawrence Weiner.

Issue 81, published in summer 2008, is a 250 page long double-issue, featuring artworks and photography from 85 artists and written contributions from over 50 authors, celebrating the German edition's 20th anniversary. The issue was titled So Leben Wir Jetzt, featuring cover-artwork from Georg Baselitz.

Issue 86, published in autumn 2009, was titled Berlin auf der Couch or Berlin on the Couch, featuring Ewa Einhorn's drawing Bear as cover art. The main theme of the issue was Germany's capital and its development, culturally and otherwise, since the 1989 end of the Berlin wall. Among contributors to this issue were Boris Groys, Iain Sinclair, Jacques Rupnik, Angelo Bolaffi, Michail Ryklin, Wolfgang Müller, Sylvère Lotringer, Eliot Weinberger, Svetlana Alexievich and Václav Bělohradský. An interview in issue 86, with politician and writer Thilo Sarrazin, in which he expressed a strong anti-immigration and anti-Muslim disposition, caused a furore in the German media.

In March 2013, Lettre International celebrated its 25th anniversary with issue 100, featuring artworks and photography from 36 artists, including Max Grüter, Lawrence Weiner and Daniel Richter. The issue's title stems from Max Grüter's cover artwork: Niveau sans frontieres.

=== Lettre Ulysses Award ===
In 2003–2006, the German edition of Lettre International initiated and organized the Lettre Ulysses Award for the Art of Reportage, in partnership with the Aventis foundation and in cooperation with the Goethe-institute. It was the first world prize in the genre of literary reportage.
