= E.N.O.T. Corp. =

Russian private military company

- Единые народные общинные товарищества
- Logo of E.N.O.T. Corp.
- Founder: Igor Mangushev X
- Dates active: 2011–2019

E.N.O.T. Corp (Russian: ЧВК «ЕНОТ», romanized: ChVK «YENOT»; also frequently written as ENOT Corp) was a Russian private military company founded by Igor Mangushev.

It undertook mercenary work in Ukraine, Syria, and Nagorno-Karabakh.

== Etymology ==
E.N.O.T. is an acronym of the organisation's full name, Russian: Единые народные общинные товарищества, romanized: Yedinyye narodnyye obshchinnyye tovarishchestva, lit. 'United People's Communal Partnerships'. Enot (енот) is also Russian for raccoon, the animal the group uses as a logo.

The organisation is sometimes known as the Yenot or Raccoon PMC.

== History and activities ==
E.N.O.T. was founded in 2011 by Russian nationalist and Svetlaya Rus founder Igor Mangushev to bring together various Donbas-based militias and give them a more official status and ability to process funds for fighter's salaries, pensions, and other social protections. E.N.O.T. has undertaken armed activities in Ukraine, Syria, Nagorno-Karabakh. In 2012, the group provided military training at a gathering of right-wing militiamen to over 450 individuals, earning 1,500,000 ₽ ($86449 international dollars in 2012) over the course of the three-day event.

Since 2015, the group has been providing military training in camps in Serbia, Donbas and Belarus. Training camp participants include children aged between 12 and 18 from Russia, Montenegro, Serbia, Belarus, Transnistria, and South Ossetia. The Serbian training camp, operated by Bosnian War veterans, was shut down by the Serbian Ministry of Internal Affairs in 2018 citing child abuse concerns. On 7 November 2018, in response to the training of children, Russia's Federal Security Service and police force arrested members of E.N.O.T., releasing them the following day.

E.N.O.T. brands itself in Russia as русская православная община (lit. 'Russian Orthodox community') and officially registered with the Russian Ministry of Justice in May 2016 as a non-profit organisation. The official purpose was stated as the promotion and protection of patriotic youth, although as of 2018, the group had not submitted any official reports on activities. Since 2015, E.N.O.T. has received support from the Russian government for activities in Syria and Karabakh. E.N.O.T. was active in the Russo-Ukrainian War and supported the war in Donbas.

=== Disbanding ===
The company was disbanded on order of its founder and leader Mangushev some time in 2019. Afterwards, the former leadership of the company would be persecuted by the Russian government. In 2021, E.N.O.T. treasurer Vladimir Morozov was sentenced to 10.5 years in prison for extortion. In 2022, organisation leader Roman Telenkevich was sentenced to 13 years in prison for organising a criminal community, extortion, and threatening to kill or cause grievous bodily harm. In early February 2023, during the Russo-Ukrainian War, founder Igor Mangushev was fatally shot in the back of the head at a Russian vehicle checkpoint in Kadiivka. Following Mangushev's death, any remaining members still holding out were largely absorbed into other units and organisations.

== See also ==
- Belligerents in the Syrian civil war
- Combatants of the war in Donbas
- Rusich Group
- Wagner Group
