= Igor Mangushev =

Russian mercenary and political advisor (1986–2023)

- Игорь Мангушев
- Mangushev in Russian-occupied Ukraine, c. 2023
- Born: Igor Leonidovich Mangushev; 16 August 1986; Moscow, Russian SFSR, Soviet Union
- Died: 8 February 2023 (aged 36); Kadiivka, Luhansk Oblast, Ukraine
- Years active: 2009–2023
- Employer: Internet Research Agency
- Organization(s): Svetlaya Rus; E.N.O.T. Corp.
- Call sign: Bereg (Берег)
- Military career
- Allegiance: Luhansk PR; Russia
- Branch: E.N.O.T. Corp. Russian Ground Forces
- Service years: 2014–2023
- Conflicts: Russo-Ukrainian War; War in Donbas; Russian invasion of Ukraine (executed); Central African Republic Civil War; Wagner Group activities

Igor Leonidovich Mangushev (Russian: Игорь Леонидович Мангушев; 16 August 1986 – 8 February 2023) was a Russian mercenary and political strategist. A prominent figure within the Kremlin, he was a hardline Russian nationalist and is known for having founded Svetlaya Rus in 2009 and E.N.O.T. Corp. in 2011.

Born in Moscow six years before the dissolution of the Soviet Union, Mangushev became affiliated with far-right politics in his youth and also worked in Russia to advance the Kremlin's objectives internationally, including through his time at the Internet Research Agency. His E.N.O.T. Corp. was a private military company that had been active in Nagorno-Karabakh, the Russian-occupied territories, and Syria, while also having a presence in the Balkans. In 2014, Mangushev was stationed in Luhansk Oblast as a captain among Ukraine's Russian separatists during the War in Donbas. He also fought in the Central African Republic Civil War as a mercenary and worked alongside Russian oligarch Yevgeny Prigozhin, who was overseeing Wagner Group activities in Africa. During the Russian invasion of Ukraine, which he took part in as an officer of an anti-drone warfare platoon, he attracted international attention for an August 2022 public speech in which he brandished a human skull that he said belonged to a Ukrainian soldier who had been killed during the Russian siege of Mariupol.

Amidst the Russo-Ukrainian War, Mangushev characterized Ukraine as an "anti-Russian state" and advocated the destruction of the Ukrainian national identity, and had "dreamed of seeing Kyiv burning"; he claimed to have been the inventor of the Russian militarist Z symbol and had frequently been photographed while posing with the Nazi salute. In February 2023, he was killed at a Russian checkpoint in the Ukrainian city of Kadiivka. His death has been described as an assassination, as he was shot in the back of his head at close range.

== Early life and activity ==
Igor Mangushev was born on 16 August 1986 in Moscow, Russian SFSR.

Mangushev grew up to become a Russian nationalist, founding the organisation Svetlaya Rus (Russian: Светлая Русь) in late 2009. Mangushev, in his role leading Svetlaya Rus, coordinated with police and conducted raids on illegal migrants living within unlicensed dwellings in the Russian Federation. Following the raids on immigrant dwellings, Mangushev would contact local Russian police, who would take note of the illegal migrants, fingerprint them, and typically release them. His group was among the first such public-private partnerships in Russia to conduct these sorts of operations following the 2011 arrest of Russian pilots in Tajikistan.

By 2012, Mangushev's connections with militant patriotic groups in Russia had strengthened, and he founded and took the helm of E.N.O.T. (Russian: Енот), which was founded to coordinate Russia's nascent militarised patriotic movement.

According to documents leaked by Anonymous, Mangushev had become an employee of the Internet Research Agency by 2013. Kommersant reported in 2015 that Mangushev had written strategic analyses for various Russian government agencies prior to the 2014 onset of the Russo-Ukrainian War. He publicly spoke about his work as an internet troll, stating that he had written messages online both in favour and in opposition to 2013 Alexei Navalny mayoral campaign as a part of his work.

== Military career ==
Mangushev worked as captain in the Luhansk People's Republic People's Militia, and as a mercenary. Through E.N.O.T. Corp., he deployed as a fighter in the Russo-Ukrainian War beginning in 2014, though E.N.O.T. had claimed at the time that it was simply providing humanitarian assistance to individuals living in Donbas. Mangushev was an active proponent of the formation and use of private military companies in the war, seeing them as a way to unify the citizens' militias with a more structured organisation that could provide documentation of the militia's military activities.

In 2015, Mangushev continued to fight in Russian-occupied Luhansk and in December 2018 he was part of a three-person Russian contingent that was delegated to Central African Republic's capital city Bangui to take part in the Central African Republic Civil War. Mangushev provided support to the Russian state media funded Radio Lengo Songo. Mangushev also worked as a political strategist for Yevgeny Prigozhin, the Russian oligarch, and then-controller of Wagner Group. The strategy work included disinformation efforts, and the organisation of agent provocateurs to work against opposition politician Lyubov Sobol during the 2019 Moscow City Duma election.

During the 2022 Russian invasion of Ukraine, Mangushev led Russia's anti-drone platoon and used the call sign Bereg. The platoon sought out and destroyed Ukrainian drones by identifying and interrupting their WiFi signals with technology developed by Mangushev and his team. Mangushev was a vocal proponent of the war and a critic of some Russian military leaders who he perceived as hesitant and making slow progress in the war. He claimed to be the inventor of the Z symbol and was often photographed posing with a Nazi salute.

Mangushev operated the Telegram channel Notes of an Adventurer. In August 2022, a video circulated showing him appearing on a stage in a Russian nightclub holding a skull that he claimed was from a Ukrainian soldier who died in the Azovstal Iron and Steel Works during the siege of Mariupol. While on stage with the skull, he stated that he sought the destruction of Ukraine as a nation-state and that Russia's goal in the invasion of Ukraine was to destroy the Ukrainian national identity. Mangushev's widow said that he took the skull from the ruins of Azovstal because "one friend's wife wanted a skull of a Ukrainian very much".

== Death ==
On the night of 4 February 2023, at a checkpoint in Kadiivka, Mangushev was shot in the back of the head. At the time, he had been stationed in Kadiivka as a soldier in the Russo-Ukrainian War. He was struck by a 9 mm bullet at close range, and afterwards was taken to a hospital in Kadiivka. He died in the hospital on 8 February 2023, aged 36.

His wife described his death as an execution, and his friends have called for an official investigation into his death. British political scientist Mark Galeotti described the shooting as a "hit", while Mangushev's widow alleged that medical care was being intentionally withheld from her husband in the days between the shooting and his death.

Mangushev's body was cremated under strict supervision of his family because, as his widow explained, a US$70,000 prize was offered for his skull in response to his performance, and the family was seriously concerned that someone from the morgue or crematory will be tempted to covertly remove and sell it.

== See also ==
- Wagner Group activities in the Central African Republic
- Wagner Group activities in Ukraine
