= Boshnyakovo =

Boshnyakovo Бошняково
- Town
- Location of Boshnyakovo
- Location of Boshnyakovo Boshnyakovo (Sakhalin Oblast)
- Coordinates: 49°39′55.5″N 142°10′34.3″E
- Country: Russia
- Federal subject: Sakhalin Oblast
- Administrative district: Uglegorsky District
- Elevation: 11 m (36 ft)

Population (2010 Census)
  - Total: 1,122
- Time zone: UTC+11 (MSK+8)
- Postal code(s): 694914
- OKTMO ID: 64652402101

Boshnyakovo (Russian: Бошняково) is a village (a selo) (from 1947 to 2004 - an urban-type settlement) in the Uglegorsky District of the Sakhalin Oblast of Russia and the administrative center of the Boshnyakovsky rural district of the Uglegorsky district. The village is located 80 km north of Uglegorsk, on the banks of the Tatar Strait.

== History ==
Until 1945, it belonged to the Japanese prefecture of Karafuto and was called Nishisakutan (Japanese: 西柵丹), which comes from the Japanese word Nishi (Japanese: 西) meaning West, and from the Ainu word Sak Kotan (Ainu: サク・コタン) meaning summer village, so the translation of the name is West Summer Village. After the transfer of South Sakhalin to the USSR, the settlement was renamed on October 15, 1947, in honor of Nikolai Konstantinovich Boshnyak.
