= Yuri Samodurov =

Russian civil activist, publicist

- Юрий Самодуров
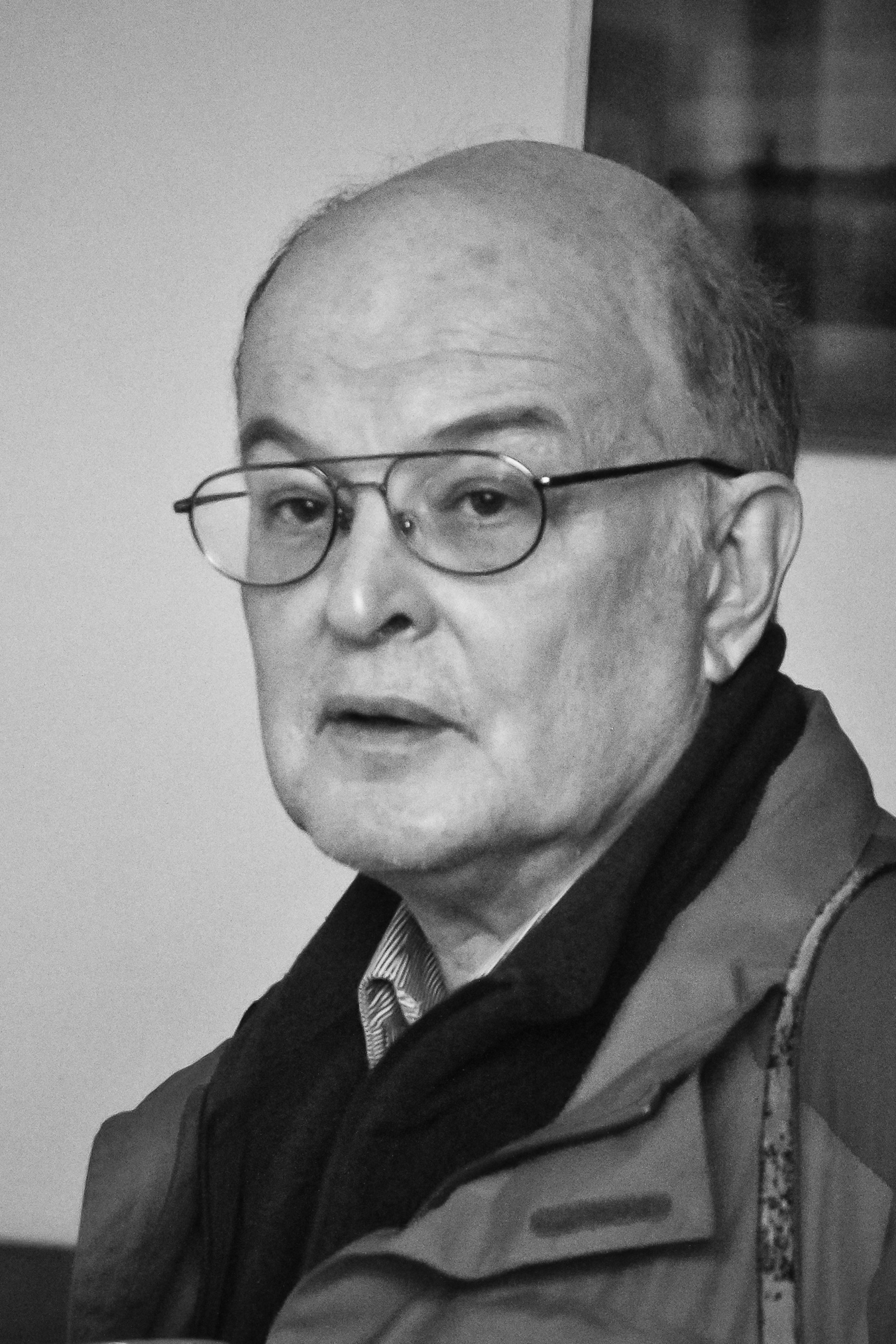
- Born: 27 September 1951 (age 74); Moscow, Russian SFSR
- Education: Russian State Geological Prospecting University
- Occupations: Civil activist; publicist; geologist
- Employer: Echo of Moscow
- Organization: Memorial
- Known for: signed Putin Must Go appeal
- Political party: Solidarnost

Yuri Vadimovich Samodurov (Russian: Юрий Вадимович Самоду́ров; born 27 September 1951, Moscow) is a Russian civil activist, publicist and public figure, candidate of geological and mineralogical sciences.

On the lat 1980s Samodurov was one of the founders of the historical and civil rights society Memorial, and author of its first program. From 13 January to 18 June 1993 he was acting director of the Vernadsky State Geological Museum. From 1996 to 2008 he was the director of Sakharov Center.

In 2004, a hearing on this case was held in the Tagansky Court of Moscow. The prosecutor demanded three years of imprisonment for Samodurov.[2] In March 2005, federal judge Vladimir Proshchenko delivered a verdict, finding Samodurov guilty of inciting religious hatred and sentencing him to a fine of one hundred thousand rubles. For holding the exhibition "Forbidden Art-2006" at the Andrei Sakharov Museum and Community Center in 2007 (curated by Andrei Erofeev), in 2010 he was again sentenced by the Tagansky Court to a fine of one hundred and fifty thousand rubles (the prosecutor again demanded three years of imprisonment for Samodurov).

In August 2008, he resigned from his post as director of the Andrei Sakharov Museum and Center of his own free will. From April 23, 2009 to November 23, 2011, he worked at the National Center for Contemporary Art, where he was the head of the program "Contemporary Art in an Open Society", the goal and idea of which was to organize and show contemporary art exhibitions outside of museums and galleries - in schools, parks, military schools, libraries, as well as in the provinces in small towns and villages. Together with Marina Zvyagintseva, he was the curator of a very large and successful exhibition "Sleeping District: Open Lesson" at the Yamburg school, together with Andrey Mitenev he proposed and implemented the project "Nomadic Museum of Contemporary Art" in Moscow during the "Night of Museums" in 2011 - about 40 artists-participants of the project walked with their exhibits on handcarts along Moscow boulevards, accompanied by more than a thousand spectators.

In 2010, Samodurov signed the appeal Putin Must Go. He is the author of articles for Echo of Moscow, Kasparov.ru and Radio Free Europe/Radio Liberty.
