= Sakharov Center =

Museum in Moscow, Russia

Coordinates: 55.7511°N 37.6586°E

The Sakharov Center
- Сахаровский центр
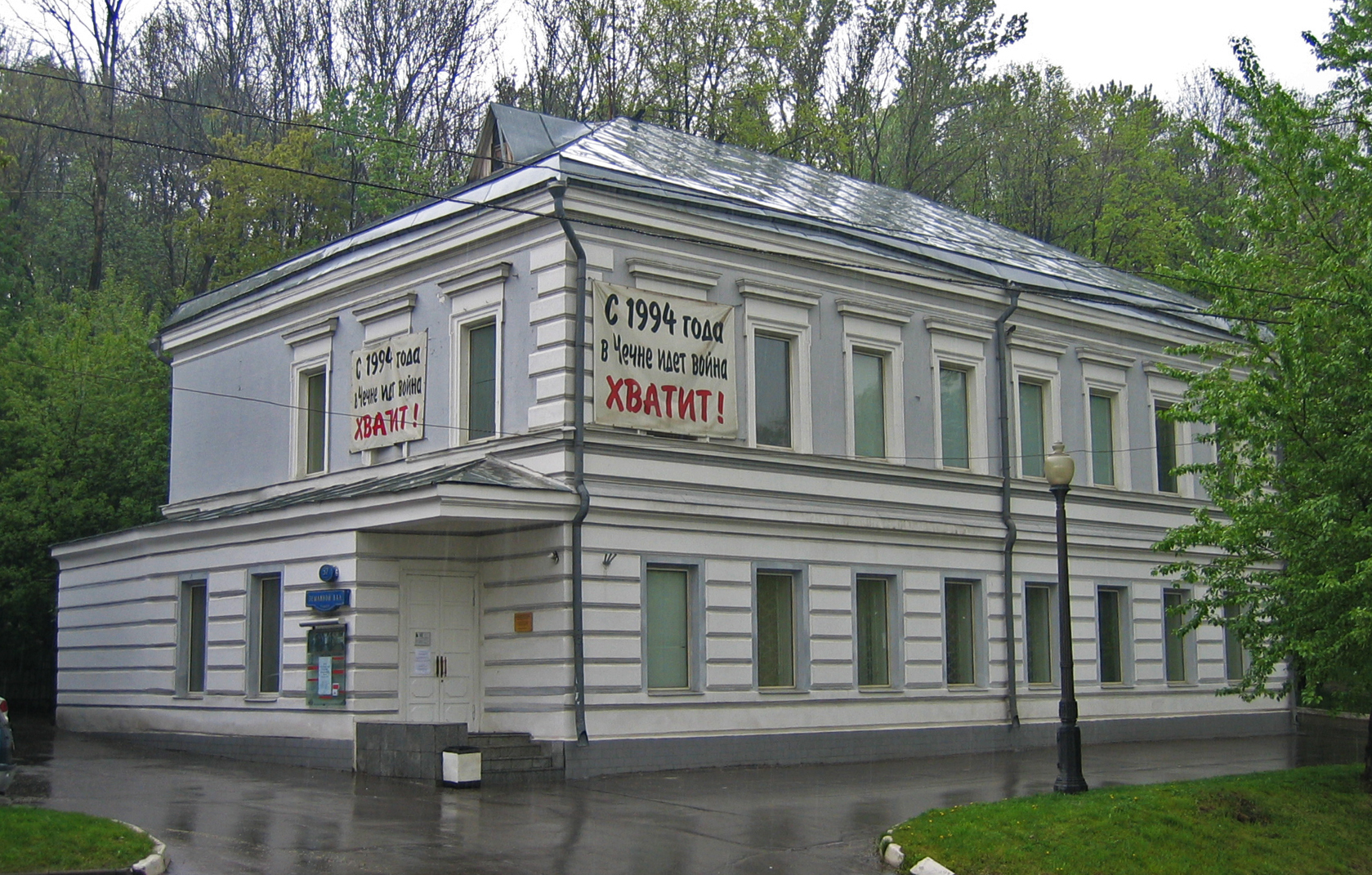
- The Sakharov Center
- Formation: 1996
- Founder: Yelena Bonner
- Dissolved: August 18, 2023; 3 years ago
- Type: Non-profit; NGO
- Purpose: Preserving Andrei Sakharov's legacy, human rights promotion and monitoring
- Headquarters: House 57, building 6, Zemlyanoy val street, 105120; Moscow, Russia
- Fields: History of human rights movement and political repression in the Soviet Union
- Director: Sergei Markovich Lukashevsky
- Website: sakharov-center.ru

The Sakharov Center (Russian: Сахаровский центр) was a museum and cultural center in Moscow devoted to protection of human rights in Russia and preserving the legacy of the prominent physicist and Nobel Prize winning human rights activist Andrei Sakharov. It was founded by the "Public Commission to Protect the Legacy of Andrei Sakharov", an international non-governmental organization established in 1990 through the efforts of Sakharov's widow Yelena Bonner and other Sakharov's friends and colleagues.

In 2014, they were first targetted by the authorities under the Russian foreign agent law. In August 2023, the center was shut down following a ruling by the Moscow City Court, after a request from the Justice Ministry.

== History ==
In 1994, the Public Commission opened the Sakharov Archives in the three-room apartment where Andrei Sakharov lived. The contents of the archive were donated by Yelena Bonner, and include files donated by Russia's Federal Counterintelligence Service.

In 1996, the Sakharov Commission opened the Sakharov Museum and multi-functional social center for Peace, Progress and Human Rights (renamed in 2012 as the Sakharov Center). The main building of the museum was a two-story manor that housed a library and a permanent exhibition dedicated to the history of the dissident movement in the USSR, and to the life and works of Andrei Sakharov. The exhibition was designed by Evgeny Asse. An installation made from a piece of the Berlin Wall stands in the park belonging to the museum.

On August 18, 2023, the Sakharov Center was shut down by a Russian court.

== Activities ==
The Sakharov Center provided a space for open expression in an increasingly restrictive political climate. In 2003, the Sakharov Center was vandalized after organizing a contemporary art exhibition titled "Caution, Religion!". In 2013, Cossacks stormed the Sakharov Center and interrupted "Moscow Trials," a play based on the trial of Pussy Riot directed by Milo Rau. In 2014, the Center was attacked by Orthodox fundamentalists during events advocating tolerance for the LGBT community. The memorial service for opposition leader Boris Nemtsov was also held in the Sakharov Center.

On December 26, 2014, the Sakharov Center was declared a "foreign agent" under Russia's foreign agent law. This law has been criticized both in Russia and internationally as representing a violation of human rights and having been designed to counter opposition groups. In fact, the court cited the Sakharov Center's political activity as the main reason for designating it as a "foreign agent". In January 2015, the Tagansky District Court fined the Sakharov Center 300,000 rubles for not voluntarily declaring itself a "foreign agent". The Sakharov Center denies this designation and has appealed the decision. On September 30, 2015, the Sakharov Center was fined again for failing to label itself as a foreign agent in an article it posted online.

On March 12, 2022, the Center published a statement about the Russian invasion of Ukraine on its website, which can be translated, in part, as:

Russian society has allowed itself to be dragged into the funnel of a monstrous crisis. The result was death, destruction and untold suffering in a neighbouring country. What happened means the moral bankruptcy of our society. And with this, regardless of the outcome of events, we will have to live for many years. The way out of this state will require a radical change in the basic attitudes of national identity, if at all it will be possible.

On January 24, 2023, Moscow authorities notified the Sakharov Center that all rental agreements with the human rights museum and cultural center were terminated, having been designated under the Russian foreign agent law, evicting the museum.
