= Ayaks =

Russian hypersonic aircraft program

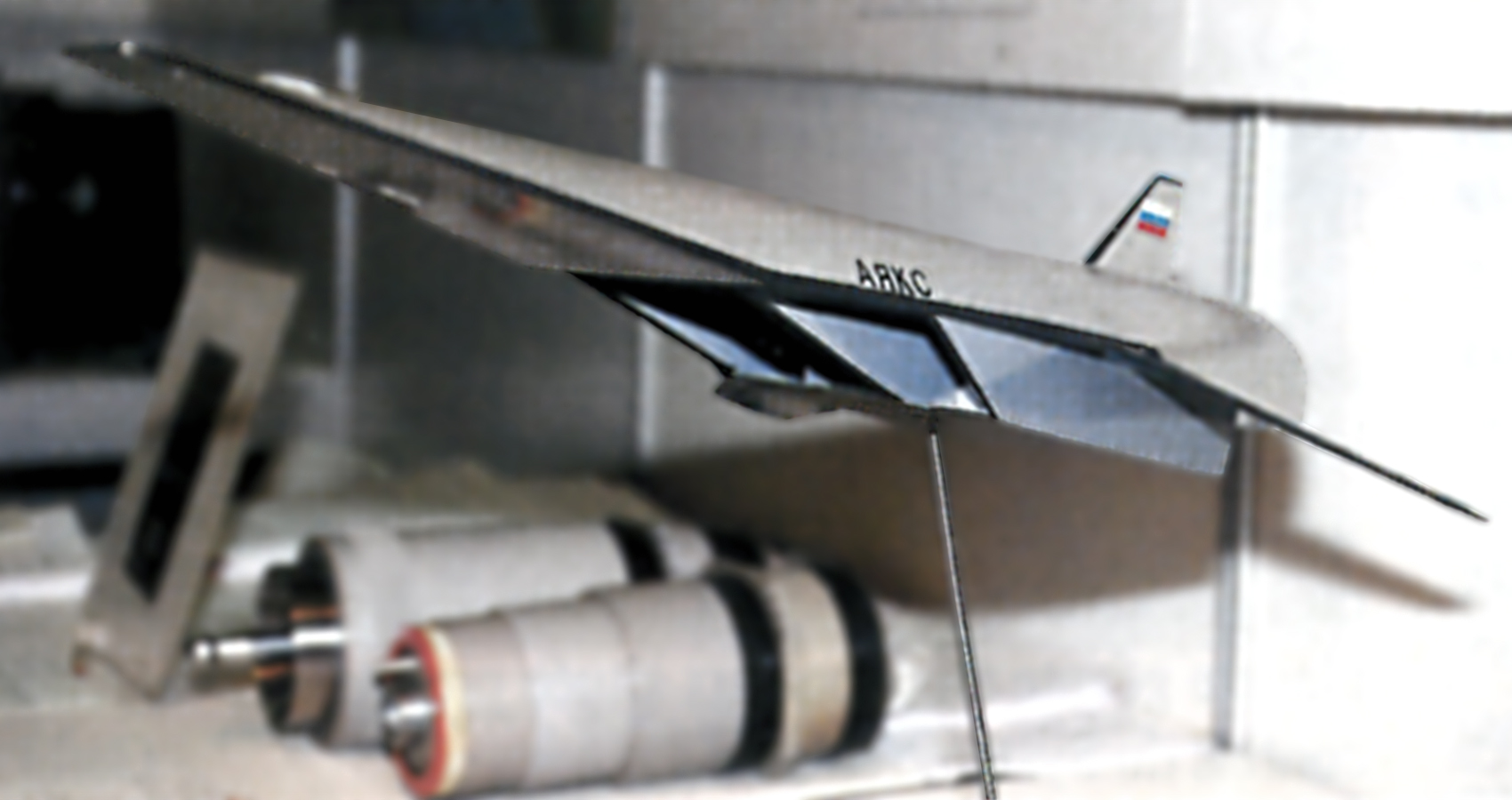
Leninetz HLDG Co. small-scale model of the Ayaks aircraft exposed at the 1993 MAKS Air Show, Moscow. The sharp isosceles trapezoid nose, flat top, inclined lower surface and rear SERN are typical of a waverider configuration, similar to the NASA X-43.

The Ayaks (Russian: АЯКС, meaning also Ajax) is a hypersonic waverider aircraft program started in the Soviet Union and currently under development by the Hypersonic Systems Research Institute (HSRI) of Leninets Holding Company in Saint Petersburg, Russia.

== Purpose ==
Ayaks was initially a classified Soviet spaceplane project aimed to design a new kind of global range hypersonic cruise vehicle capable of flying and conducting a variety of military missions in the mesosphere. The original concept revolved around a hypersonic reconnaissance aircraft project, but later was expanded into the wider concept of hypersonic multi-purpose military and civilian jets, as well as a SSTO platform for launching satellites.

The mesosphere is the layer of the Earth's atmosphere from 50 kilometres (160,000 ft) to 85 kilometres (279,000 ft) high, above the stratosphere and below the thermosphere. It is very difficult to fly in the mesosphere — the air is too rarefied for aircraft wings to generate lift, but sufficiently dense to cause aerodynamic drag on satellites. In addition, parts of the mesosphere fall inside the ionosphere, meaning the air is ionized due to solar radiation.

The ability to conduct military activities in the mesosphere gives a country some significant military potential.

== History ==
Layout of the projected Ayaks aircraft

In the late 1970s, Soviet scientists began to explore a novel type of hypersonic propulsion system concept, exposed for the first time in a Russian newspaper with a short interview of Ayaks' inventor, Pr. Vladimir L. Fraĭshtadt. Fraĭshtadt worked at that time at the aero branch of the PKB Nevskoye-Neva Design Bureau in Leningrad. He developed the Ayaks concept around the idea that an efficient hypersonic vehicle cannot afford to lose energy to its surroundings (i.e. to overcome air resistance), but should instead take advantage of the energy carried by the high speed incoming flux. At that time, the whole concept was unknown to the West, although early developments involved the cooperation of Soviet industrial enterprises, technical institutes, the Military-Industrial Commission of the USSR (VPK) and the Russian Academy of Sciences.

In 1990, two articles by defense specialist and writer Nikolai Novichkov gave more details about the Ayaks program. The second was the first document available in English.

Shortly after the dissolution of the Soviet Union, funding was cut and the Ayaks program had to evolve, especially as the US government announced the National Aero-Space Plane (NASP) program. At that time, Fraĭshtadt became director of the OKB-794 Design Bureau, publicly known as Leninets, a holding company running the open joint-stock company State Hypersonic Systems Research Institute (HSRI) (Russian: НИПГС pr: "NIPGS") in Saint Petersburg.

In early 1993, as an answer to the American announcement of the X-30 NASP demonstrator, the Ayaks project integrates into the wider national ORYOL (Russian: Орёл pr: "Or'yol", Eagle) program, federating all Russian hypersonic works to design a competing spaceplane as a reusable launch system.

In September 1993 the program was unveiled and a first small-scale model of Ayaks was publicly shown for the first time on the Leninetz booth at the 2nd MAKS Air Show in Moscow.

In 1994 Novichkov revealed that the Russian Federation was ready to fund the Ayaks program for eight years and that a reusable small-scale flight test module had been built by the Arsenal Design Bureau. He also stated that Ayaks' working principles had been validated with an engine test stand in a wind tunnel. The same year, the American NASP project was cancelled and replaced by the Hypersonic Systems Technology Program (HySTP), cancelled as well after three months. In 1995 NASA launched the Advanced Reusable Transportation Technologies (ARTT) program, part of the Highly Reusable Space Transportation (HRST) initiative, but experts from consulting firm ANSER evaluating Ayaks technologies did not believe at first in the performances announced by the Russians and did not recommend development along the same path.

However, between October 1995 and April 1997, a series of Russian patents covering Ayaks technologies were granted to Leninetz HLDG Co. and consequently available publicly, the oldest having been filed 14 years before.

As the information available out of Russia started to grow, three western academic researchers started to collect the sparse data about Ayaks: Claudio Bruno, professor at the Sapienza University of Rome; Paul A. Czysz, professor at the Parks College of Engineering, Aviation and Technology at Saint Louis University; and S. N. B. Murthy, professor at Purdue University. In September 1996, as part of the Capstone Design Course and the Hypersonic Aero-Propulsion Integration Course at Parks College, Czysz assigned his students to analyze the information gathered, as the ODYSSEUS project. Thereafter the three researchers copublished a conference paper summarizing the Western analysis of Ayaks principles.

With such information, long-time ANSER main expert Ramon L. Chase reviewed his former position and assembled a team to evaluate and develop American versions of Ayaks technologies within the HRST program. He recruited H. David Froning Jr., CEO of Flight Unlimited; Leon E. McKinney, world expert in fluid dynamics; Paul A. Czysz; Mark J. Lewis, aerodynamicist at the University of Maryland, College Park, specialist of waveriders and airflows around leading edges and director of the NASA-sponsored Maryland Center for Hypersonic Education and Research; Dr. Robert Boyd of Lockheed Martin Skunk Works able to build real working prototypes with allocated budgets from black projects, whose contractor General Atomics is a world leader in superconducting magnets (that Ayaks uses); and Dr. Daniel Swallow from Textron Systems, one of the few firms still possessing expertise in magnetohydrodynamic converters, which Ayaks extensively uses.

== Novel technologies ==
=== MHD bypass ===
Layout of Ayaks engines

The Ayaks was projected to employ a novel engine using a magnetohydrodynamic generator to collect and slow down highly ionized and rarefied air upstream of airbreathing jet engines, usually scramjets, although HSRI project lead Vladimir L. Fraĭshtadt said in a 2001 interview that the Ayaks MHD bypass system could decelerate the incoming hypersonic airflow sufficiently to almost use conventional turbomachinery. This would be a surprising technical solution considering such hypersonic speeds, yet confirmed as feasible by independent studies using Mach 2.7 turbojets or even subsonic ramjets.

The air is mixed with fuel into the mixture that burns in the combustor, while the electricity produced by the inlet MHD generator feeds the MHD accelerator located behind the jet engine near the single expansion ramp nozzle to provide additional thrust and specific impulse. The plasma funnel developed over the air inlet from the Lorentz forces greatly increases the ability of the engine to collect air, increasing the effective diameter of the air inlet up to hundreds of meters. It also extends the Mach regime and altitude the aircraft can cruise to. Thus, it is theorized that the Ayaks' engine can operate using atmospheric oxygen even at heights above 35 kilometres (115,000 ft).

A non-equilibrium MHD generator typically produces 1–5 MWe with such parameters (channel cross-section, magnetic field strength, pressure, degree of ionization and velocity of the working fluid) but the increased effective diameter of the air inlet by the virtual plasma funnel greatly increases the power produced to 45–100 MWe per engine. As Ayaks may use two to four of such engines, some electrical energy could be diverted to peaceful or military directed-energy devices.

=== Thermochemical reactors ===
The fuel feed system of the Ayaks engine is also novel. At supersonic speeds, air brutally recompress downstream the stagnation point of a shock wave, producing heat. At hypersonic speeds, the heat flux from shock waves and air friction on the body of an aircraft, especially at the nose and leading edges, becomes considerable, as the temperature is proportional to the square of the Mach number. That is why hypersonic speeds are problematic with respect to the strength of materials and are often referred to as the heat barrier.

Ayaks uses thermochemical reactors (TCRs): the heating energy from air friction is used to increase the heat capacity of the fuel, by cracking the fuel with a catalytic chemical reaction. The aircraft has double shielding between which water and ordinary, cheap kerosene circulates in hot parts of the airframe. The energy of surface heating is absorbed through heat exchangers to trigger a series of chemical reactions in presence of a nickel catalyzer, called hydrocarbon steam reforming. Kerosene and water spits into a new fuel reformate: methane (70–80% in volume) and carbon dioxide (20–30%) in a first stage:

C_{n}H_{m} + H_{2}O $\rightleftharpoons$ CH_{4} + CO_{2}

Then methane and water reform in their turn in a second stage into hydrogen, a new fuel of better quality, in a strong endothermic reaction:

CH_{4} + H_{2}O $\rightleftharpoons$ CO + 3H_{2}
CO + H_{2}O $\rightleftharpoons$ CO_{2} + H_{2}

Thus, the heating capacity of the fuel increases, and the surface of the aircraft cools down.

The calorific value of the mixture CO + 3H_{2} produced from 1 kg of methane through water steam reforming (62,900 kJ) is 25% higher than that of methane only (50,100 kJ).

Besides a more energetic fuel, the mixture is populated by many free radicals that enhance the degree of ionization of the plasma, further increased by the combined use of e-beams that control electron concentration, and HF pulse repetitive discharges (PRDs) that control electron temperature. Such systems create streamer discharges that irrigate the ionized flow with free electrons, increasing combustion effectiveness, a process known as plasma-assisted combustion (PAC).

Such concept was initially named Magneto-Plasma-Chemical Engine (MPCE), and the working principle referred to as Chemical Heat Regeneration and Fuel Transformation (CHRFT). In subsequent literature, the accent has been put more on magnetohydrodynamics than on the chemical part of these engines, which are now simply referred to as a scramjet with MHD bypass as these concepts intimately require each other to work efficiently.

The idea of thermally shielding the engine is detailed in the fundamental analysis of an ideal turbojet for maximum thrust analysis in the aerothermodynamics literature. That is, putting the turbine (work extraction) upstream and the compressor (work addition) downstream. For a conventional jet engine, the thermodynamics works, however the advanced thermo-fluids analysis shows that in order to add sufficient heat to power the aircraft without thermally choking the flow (and unstarting the engine) the combustor has to grow and the amount of heat added grows as well. It is more "efficient" in using the heat, it just needs a lot of heat. While thermodynamically very sound, the real engine is too large and consumes too much power to ever fly on an aircraft. These issues do not arise in the Ayaks concept as the plasma funnel virtually increases the cross-section of the air inlet while maintaining its limited physical size, and additional energy is taken from the flow itself. As Fraĭshtadt said, "Since it takes advantage of the CHRFT technology, Ayaks cannot be analyzed as a classical heat engine."

=== Plasma sheath ===
As altitude increases, the electrical resistance of air decreases according to Paschen's law. The air at the nose of Ayaks is ionized. Besides e-beams and HF pulse discharges, a high voltage is produced by the Hall effect in the MHD generator that allows a planar glow discharge to be emitted from the sharp nose of the aircraft and the thin leading edges of its wings, by a St. Elmo's fire effect. Such a plasma cushion in front and around the aircraft is said to offer several advantages:

- The ionized air becomes electrically conductive, which allows the MHD generator to work and decelerate the flow down to the air-breathing jet engines.
- The bow shock wave is detached further ahead of the aircraft, the energy deposition in this region acting as a virtual blunted nose, although the nose stays physically very sharp. This minimizes the heat flux on materials.
- The temperature gradient in the air is locally modified, hence the speed of sound value, which mitigates and softens the shock wave. This lowers thermal effects on materials further, as well as the wave drag.
- The plasma cocoon surrounding the whole aircraft gives plasma stealth. Combined with hypersonic speeds and maneuverability, such a platform would be very difficult to detect, track and target.

== Specifications ==
According to the data presented at the 2001 MAKS Airshow, the specifications of the Ayaks are:

Parameter	Hypersonic Satellite Launcher	Multi-purpose Hypersonic Craft	Transport Hypersonic Craft
Maximum takeoff weight, tonne	267	200	390
Loaded Weight, tonne	113	85	130
Empty weight, tonne	76		
Mass of the second stage, tonne	36		
Payload, tonne		10	10
Satellite mass, tonne	6		
Turbojet engines	4	4	4
Magneto-plasma-chemical engines	4	6	4
Thrust, turbojet engines, tonne	4×25	4×25	4×40
Thrust, magneto-plasma-chemical engines	4×25	6×14	4×40
Maximal speed, m/s	4000	4000	4600
Service ceiling, km	36	36	36
Practical range at M = 8 ... 10 and height of 30 km, km	14200	10000	12000

Later publications cite even more impressive numbers, with expected performance of service ceiling of 60 km and cruising speed of Mach 10–20, and the ability to reach the orbital speed of 28,440 km/h with the addition of booster rockets, the spaceplane then flying in boost-glide trajectories (successive rebounds or "skips" on the upper layers of the atmosphere, alternating unpowered gliding and powered modes) similarly to the US hypersonic waverider project HyperSoar with a high glide ratio of 40:1.

== Speculation ==
In 2003, French engineer Jean-Pierre Petit's study was based on a paper published in January 2001 in the French magazine Air et Cosmos by Alexandre-David Szamès, and in the same month from information gathered in a small workshop on advanced propulsion in Brighton, England, especially after discussions with David Froning Jr. from Flight Unlimited about his prior work involving electric and electromagnetic discharges in hypersonic flows, presented during the workshop.

Petit wrote about a large and long multipole wall MHD converter on the upper flat surface of the aircraft in contact with the freestream, instead of the linear cross-field Faraday converters located within a channel usually considered. In such a multipole converter, magnetic field is produced by many parallel superconducting thin wires instead of pairs of bigger electromagnets. These wires run below the surface directly in contact with the airflow, their profile following the body of the vehicle. Air is progressively decelerated in the boundary layer in a laminar flow without too much recompression, down to subsonic values as it enters the inlet then the air-breathing jet engines. Such an open wall MHD-controlled inlet will be exposed by two scientists of the Ayaks program in a similar way two years later, although they propose to locate it on the surface of the inclined front ramp underneath the aircraft, to vector the shock wave as a "shock-on-lip" upon the air inlet, whatever the speed and altitude.

As subsonic velocities can be achieved internally while the external flow is still hypersonic, Petit proposes that such platform could use almost conventional turbojets and ramjets instead of scramjets more difficult to control, and such plane would not need vertical stabilizers nor fins anymore, as it would maneuver through locally increasing or reducing drag on particular regions of the wetted area with electromagnetic forces. He then describes a similar multipole MHD accelerator located on the physical surface of the semi-guided ramp nozzle, which accelerates the conductive exhaust gases downstream the jet engines.

Ten years before Petit, Dr. Vladimir I. Krementsov, head of the Nizhny Novgorod Research Institute of Radio Engineering (NIIRT), and Dr Anatoly Klimov, chief of the Moscow Radiotechnical Institute of the Russian Academy of Sciences (MRTI RAS), exposed to William Kaufmann that the MHD bypass system of the Ayaks concept would have been already built in the rumored Aurora secret spaceplane, successor of the Lockheed SR-71 Blackbird.

== References in popular culture ==
- The Ayaks program features prominently in the book The Broken Sword of the Empire by Maxim Kalashnikov.

== See also ==
- Magnetohydrodynamic converter
- Soviet space program
- Avangard (hypersonic glide vehicle)
