= Mikhail Delyagin =

Russian author, politician, and economist

Mikhail Delyagin MP
- Михаил Делягин
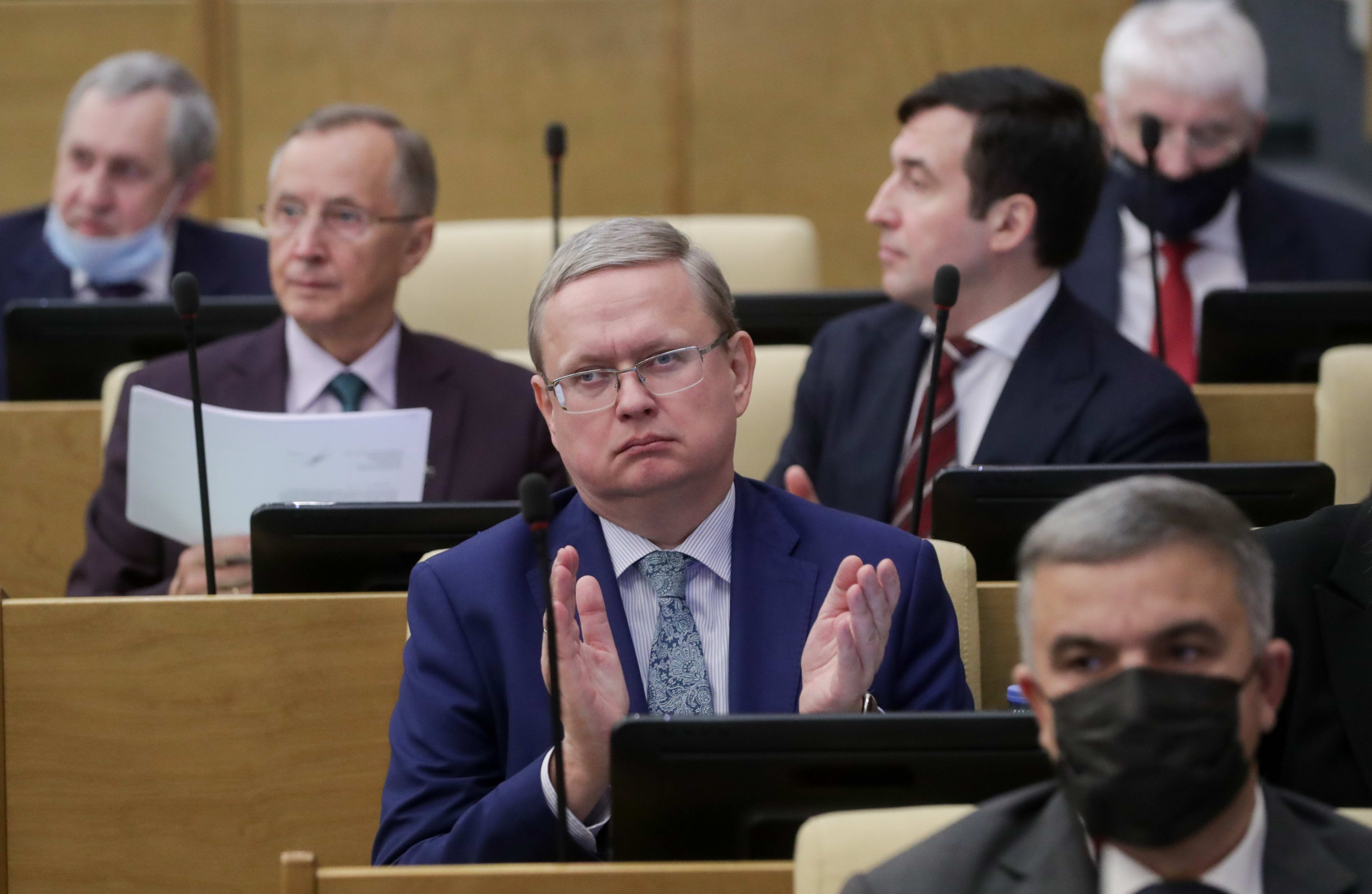

Member of the State Duma (Party List Seat)
- Incumbent
- Assumed office 12 October 2021

Personal details
- Born: 19 March 1968 (age 58) Moscow, Russian SFSR, Soviet Union
- Party: A Just Russia - For Truth
- Education: Moscow State University (DPhil)
- Occupation: Economist

Mikhail Gennadyevich Delyagin (Russian: Михаи́л Генна́дьевич Деля́гин, IPA: [mʲɪxɐˈil ɡʲɪˈnadʲjɪvʲɪdʑ dʲɪˈlʲæɡʲɪn]; born 16 March 1968) is a Russian author, economist and member of the State Duma.

== Biography ==
In 1985, he graduated from Moscow Secondary School No. 26 with a gold medal. and he entered the Faculty of Economics at Moscow State University.

After graduating from the first year in 1986-1988, he served in the Soviet Army (at that time, students of most universities were deprived of deferral).

After demobilization, he continued his studies and in his third year wrote a term paper under the scientific supervision of Igor Vasilyevich Nita on the topic of Soviet monopolies, with which he took third place at the All-Union competition of scientific papers of young specialists, graduate students and students, conducted by the Institute of Economics of the USSR Academy of Sciences. In July 1990, thanks to Nust, who became the first economic adviser to Boris Yeltsin, who had just been elected Chairman of the Supreme Soviet of the RSFSR, Delyagin joined Yeltsin's personal staff as an expert in the Group of Experts of the Chairman of the Supreme Soviet of the RSFSR, then the President of Russia, and then in 1992 — November 1993 — the chief specialist of the Group of Experts of the President of the Russian Federation. In this group, Delyagin worked together with Pavel Medvedev, Lev Freinkman, Viktor Krivov, Ivan Ivanovich Kharlanov, Anton Danilov-Danilyan, Andrey Melnikov and Galina Tereshchenko.

In 1992, combining his studies with work, he graduated with honors from the Faculty of Economics of Moscow State University.

1993-1994 — Deputy Director of Kominvest.

In 1995, at Moscow State University, he defended his thesis for the degree of Candidate of Economic Sciences on the topic "Statistical analysis of the regional development of the Russian banking system."».

In May 1994-1996 — Chief Analyst at the Analytical Center under the President of the Russian Federation (heads — Evgeny Yasin, Mark Urnov, V. Pechenev).

In March 1996, Delyagin joined the expert group at the Presidential Aides Service. This group was formed by Georgy Satarov in order to develop election documents for Boris Yeltsin's team. In June 1996, Delyagin participated in writing the "Second Letter to the Thirteen" — appeals of the oligarchs directed against Zyuganov's program, as well as publishes a corresponding article in the newspaper Kommersant».

In October 1996-1997, he worked as a research assistant to the President of Russia for Economic Affairs, Sergei Ignatiev.

In March 1997— he became an adviser to Anatoly Kulikov, Deputy Chairman of the Russian Government and Minister of Internal Affairs.

June 1997 — August 14, 1998 — Advisor to Boris Nemtsov, First Deputy Prime Minister of Russia.

In 1998, at the Russian Academy of Public Administration, he defended his thesis for the degree of Doctor of Economics on the topic "Finance in ensuring the economic security of the Russian Federation".

In October 1998 — May 1999— he was an adviser to the First Deputy Chairman of the Government of Russia, Yuri Maslyukov.

In May—July 1999— he was Deputy Head of the Secretariat of the First Deputy Prime Minister of Russia Nikolai Aksenenko.

In August 1999 – 2002— he was an adviser to the head of the Fatherland — All Russia movement, Yevgeny Primakov.

In August 1998 — April 2002 — Director of the Institute of Problems of Globalization (IPROG).

March 2002 — August 2003 — Advisor to the Chairman of the Government of Russia Mikhail Kasyanov.

Since 2002 — Chairman of the Editorial Board of the FORUM.Moscow, according to some sources, his sponsor. Together with its editor-in-chief A. Baranov, he participates in the May Day demonstrations.

In March 2004 — July 2006 — Chairman of the Program Committee, then Chairman of the Ideological Committee of the Rodina Party». At the end of 2004, he was nominated as a candidate for deputy of the State Duma from the Rodina party in the Preobrazhensky district.

In March 2006— he was again the director of IPROG, and since May 2017, he has been its scientific director.

From September 11, 2010 to April 2011 — Chairman of the Motherland: Common Sense party.

Since December 2011, he has been the editor—in—chief of Svobodnaya Mysl magazine (until 1991, he was a Communist).

The main developer of the Russian government's program "On measures to stabilize the socio-economic situation in the country" (autumn 1998), participant in negotiations with the International Monetary Fund and the World Bank in January—April 1999.

Honorary Professor (2000) of Jilin University (China). Research Professor at the Moscow State Institute of International Relations (2003). Member of the Council on Foreign and Defense Policy (1999), the Board of the All-Russian Union of Commodity Producers (2001), the Supervisory Board of the World Anti-Criminal Anti-Terrorist Forum (2001), co-founder and Deputy Chairman of the Russian Taxpayers Union (2003), member of the Presidium of the National Investment Council (2005). Full State Adviser of the Russian Federation, 2nd class, has the gratitude of the President of the Russian Federation Boris Yeltsin. Member of the Public Chamber of the Union State of Russia and Belarus (since 2017). By decree of the President of the Russian Federation V. V. Putin, he was appointed to the Scientific Council of the Security Council of the Russian Federation (2017). A full member of the Russian Academy of Natural Sciences.

The developer of the theory of globalization (in particular, he substantiated the key feature of globalization — the formation of collective consciousness as the main type of management of human activity in the 21st century; introduced the concepts of meta-technologies and high—hume - by analogy with high-tech; developed a theory of development and formation of a global management class). Researcher of the complex influence of the main political, economic and social groups on the functioning of the state (since 1995). Developer of the first Banking Atlas of Russia (1995-1997).

Since 2008, he has been a member of the Expert Council and a regular author of the international analytical journal "Geopolitics".

Since 2009, he has been hosting the program "Personal Money" on radio Komsomolskaya Pravda.

Since 2012, he has been a member of the Izborsk Club.

In 2012-2015, he was a member of the General Council of the WFP "Party of Business".

Since 2013, he has been a columnist on the analytical Internet channel Den—TV (created by Alexander Borodai).

In 2013-2015, he was an expert at the Moscow Economic Forum.

Since 2014, he has been a regular expert on the programs "Time will Tell" on Channel One, "Meeting Place" on NTV.

In 2016, in the elections to the State Duma of the 7th convocation, he was nominated by the A Just Russia party as part of the federal and regional part of the party list of Krasnoyarsk Krai (although in 2003 he once called the Party of Life a “muskrat”»).

In 2016-2018, he hosted his personal weekly radio program "Moscow Speaks"; the program was closed after M. G. Delyagin announced live on air the results of the radio listeners' vote, which showed that they preferred presidential candidate P. Grudinin to the current president V. Putin.

Since 2017 — columnist for the Tsargrad TV channel, hosts the section Position. Delyagin, in the second half of 2019 — Mobile Delyagin. Makes releases on political and economic issues on his YouTube channels Delyagin TV (account blocked for violating community rulesYouTube) и Real Delyagin ((51.4K subscribers, less than 2M views)).

In 1995, he was the first to use the word "oligarch" as a description of the leading politically influential figures of modern Russian business.

n 2001, he published a forecast stating that “in 2008, it is possible that a black man will be nominated for US President, who will collect a significant number of votes.”.

In 2003, during an election debate, Zhirinovsky told the Rodina candidate, former Airborne Forces commander General Shpak: "I am glad that your son died in Chechnya," and repeated this phrase several times until his microphone was cut off. In response, Delyagin called Zhirinovsky an "animal," after which he ordered his guards to beat him up, which led to a mass brawl.

Key books: "Beacons of Darkness: The Physiology of the Liberal Clan from Gaidar and Berezovsky to Sobchak and Navalny (2016)", "The Festive Hell of Freedom" (the story of Romeo and Juliet, rewritten for a world where ordinary relations between the sexes are prohibited by law; a libretto for a ballet about a liberal dream, reviews and army poems), "Beware, the Doors Are Opening. Volume 1. General Theory of Globalization" and Volume 2. "Special Theory of Globalization" (2019).

In April 2020, M. G. Delyagin's personal website took 96th place in terms of citation in Runet social media according to the Brand Analytics analytical center, becoming one of three (except for the websites of Navalny and Sobyanin, who took the hundredth place) included in the rating of personal pages.

At the end of 2020, he put forward an initiative to support by all reasonable forces of Russia the "Pact of Normality - a Step towards Transforming Russia", which includes populist demands that, in his opinion, unite the absolute majority of Russians: the return of the retirement age of 55/60 years, a guarantee of a real subsistence minimum for citizens, progressive taxation of income and property, a compensatory tax based on the results of privatization, the direction of budget reserves to the development of Russia, confiscate property transferred to offshore zones as ownerless, limit corruption, arbitrariness of monopolies and financial speculation, provide cheap credit, withdraw from WTO agreements, cancel the Unified State Exam, stop the coronavirus madness, normalizeTemplate:Unknown term medicine and education, ban microfinance organizations, abolish juvenile justice and bring its organizers to justice, introduce a visa regime with social disaster zones, eliminate social dumping by obliging employers to provide migrant workers with conditions no worse than citizens of the Russian Federation, to finance their socialization and bear responsibility for the offenses they commit; to punish violators of these norms for the slave trade, to cancel the "tax maneuver" of 2018 (stimulating the export of raw materials from Russia and undermining its processing), to reduce VAT to 10%, to exempt investments from profit tax, to exempt productive small and micro businesses from all taxes, to double the responsibility of civil servants for offenses compared to ordinary citizens, to introduce the election of judges and senators, to govern on the basis of permanent electronic referendums with flexible delegation of votes".

He was a candidate for deputy of the State Duma of the VIII convocation in the elections in September 2021 from the party "A Just Russia - For Truth" and won the elections.

Deputy Chairman of the State Duma Committee on Economic Policy.

During the Russian invasion of Ukraine in April 2022, as part of a group of deputies, he introduced a bill that would empower the Russian Prosecutor General and his deputies to invalidate media registrations and terminate television and radio broadcasting licenses if they spread “fakes” about the Russian military and their “discrediting,” calls for sanctions, as well as information that contains “clear disrespect for society, the state, and the Constitution of the Russian Federation.”.

== Main areas of scientific activity ==
The developer of the theory of globalization (in particular, he substantiated the key feature of globalization - the formation of collective consciousness as the main type of management of human activity in the 21st century; introduced the concepts of metatechnologies and high-hume - by analogy with high-tech; developed a theory of the development and formation of a global governing class), the author of the theory of the transition from the information society to the world of "social platforms", which, in his opinion, occurred in 2020.

Researcher of the history of the formation and destruction of the British Empire, social mechanisms of the Austro-Hungarian Empire.

Researcher of the complex influence of the main political, economic and social groups on the functioning of the state (since 1995).

Author of the analysis of the specifics of Russian culture from the point of view of the global competitiveness of the Russian Federation.

Developer of the first Banking Atlas of Russia (1995-1997).

== Political views and goals ==
Delyagin's transition from liberalism to his current political views occurred in 1994 thanks to E. G. Yasin ("Yevgeny Grigoryevich Yasin 'cured' me of liberalism"), who, during the devaluation of the ruble, which led to the resignation of A. N. Shokhin and other members of the government and the strengthening of A. B. Chubais, resolutely convinced V. S. Chernomyrdin not to resort to extreme measures in carrying out reforms for several days. Delyagin, observing all these events, was deeply shocked by the system of values that dominated the new government environment and ceased to be a liberal. In addition, the First Chechen War served as a watershed: at its beginning, Delyagin was in the political team that opposed it.

In March 2008, Delyagin took part in the 6th Congress of the PCRM. A new party program was discussed and adopted at the congress. Delyagin admired the combination of liberalism and communism in the program and emphasized: "Competitiveness requires a free person and requires justice. And freedom and justice are precisely that very communist liberalism that made me happy." In the summer of 2008, Delyagin spoke about the leader of the PCRM: "Voronin is one of the few leaders in the post-Soviet space who evokes very strong and warm feelings. Extreme liberalism is completely unexpected for a communist... this is what the modern left should strive for. This is the closest to the ideal modern left." In 2009, Delyagin again praised the PCRM: "The economic achievements of the PCRM are indisputable." Delyagin is a categorical opponent of a totally distributive planned economy ("nonsense"), but considers its strategic planning necessary; fully supports the idea of a "compensatory tax" on major privatization participants in order to overcome the "split in Russian society between those who feel robbed and those who feel robbed", emphasizing that the tax can be levied "in kind, that is, in share packages".

On December 10, 2011, Delyagin, together with A. Baranov, spoke at a protest rally on Bolotnaya Square, proclaiming "the beginning of the Russian political spring"; he demanded the abolition of Article 282 of the Criminal Code of the Russian Federation.

After the publication of V.V. Putin's articles in February 2012, he supported the ideas set out in them. Later, he systematically criticized the government for failing to implement Putin's May decrees, and Putin himself for condoning the "sabotage" of his decrees.

In June 2016, Mikhail Delyagin joined the left-center party "A Just Russia". He formulates his public goals as follows:

to tell the leaders and politicians of Russia what is happening with our society and the world around it (and why the state should serve the people, not global speculators...) and what would be right to do for the success of our country.

In 2018, Delyagin proposed, as a response to the "cold war of annihilation unleashed against Russia by the United States", to close enterprises that are destroying the health of Russian citizens, or force them to switch to the production of safe products (including McDonald's catering and the production of highly carbonated drinks with excess sugar), and also to impose a 10% tax on transactions with the dollar, ensuring complete freedom of transactions with other currencies.

He is an expert at the Moscow Economic Forum.

== Criticism ==
After Delyagin's appointment as Kasyanov's assistant to Prime Minister in 2002, Kommersant recalled his statement about President Vladimir Putin, made earlier on Chekist Day.: "The problem is not even that we are ruled by Stalin, but that we are ruled by a very small Stalin who is not even able to strategize and decide where he wants to lead the country.". The profile publication Financial Russia noted in 2002 the strange appointment of Delyagin as Kasyanov's as

Last week it became known that economist Mikhail Delyagin has been appointed Mikhail Kasyanov's assistant. <...> The event seemed to be an ordinary one, but it caused a slight sensation among Delyagin's colleagues for two reasons. Firstly, everyone knows that Delyagin strongly disagreed with the economic course of Kasyanov's cabinet, and there are probably no accusations that Delyagin would not have had time to publicly express against the government[66]. Secondly, Delyagin's very persona as an assistant to the prime minister looks extremely odious — it feels like the economist has made it his profession to promote his own views on any issues. Over the past two months alone, Mikhail Delyagin has given 8 press conferences: on the euro, capital flight, Russia's modernization strategy, Bush's address to Congress, inflation in January, the Falcon case, Russia's accession to the WTO, and President Putin's reputation. Simply put, Delyagin slightly overfed the press. A somewhat ironic attitude began to arise among journalists towards Mr. Delyagin: an expert on any issues, ready to give any comments. But if the government says "white," then Delyagin will definitely say "black." Most importantly, it was unclear why, actually. The public and the press should be interested in the opinion of Mikhail Delyagin, who is, in fact, a private individual. <...> Prior to his appointment to the White House, Mikhail Delyagin called himself the "public director of the Institute for Problems of Globalization," but no one had ever heard of any other researchers at this institute. Therefore, the press dubbed Delyagin a "man-institute." Mikhail Delyagin's fame arose due to conscious, systematic and extremely intensive PR. And the government, of course, also noticed the efforts of the human institution. Which is probably what he wanted.

Left-wing publicist Dmitry Yakushev wrote in 2005: "Listening to Delyagin, I found out one important thing. Previously, I didn't quite understand how you could come up with outright nonsense about Putin's feudalism and expect people to take it seriously. Then it hit me. Delyagin came up with an ideological scheme justifying the anti-Putin alliance of the left with the big bourgeoisie, and he does not doubt for a second that the scheme is brilliant, since he is a great economist and everything he comes up with is brilliant by definition. Yakushev also noted in 2008 that Delyagin's views were anti-human: "Following him, the progress of mankind will probably strive not to fight poverty and disease, but to the customs of Sparta. There, the problems of improving the gene pool were solved easily.". Andrey Terentyev (Trudovaya Rossiya) calls Delyagin a "prominent businessman of left-wing political business"

: I wonder how Delyagin's "curbing monopolies" combines with the imperialist struggle for the redistribution of world markets? It's very simple. Delyagin is an educated businessman enough to seriously express the interests of the petty bourgeoisie. In fact, he breeds petty-bourgeois snot in the interests of preserving big capital and the capitalist mode of production as a whole.

Vladimir Burdyugov, a member of the Politburo of the Central Committee of the CPSU and editor of the Communist magazine in 2011, called Delyagin "pink not by his looks, but by his complexion.", He also accused them of being ready to "... surrender Russia to the flower revolutions" and "... prepare a Libyan scenario for Russia.".

The official website of the PKK-PKK in 2019 called Delyagin a "hardened bourgeois politician", and in 2013, he became a "soldier of the bourgeois empire".

Since M. Delyagin, according to S. G. Kara-Murza, adheres to both left-centrist and "orange" views., this position provokes protest from both some supporters and opponents of the ideas of liberalism in Russia. Both tried to find in his publications signs of obvious sympathy for any political ideology in Russia. In 2005, in his book "Exporting Revolution. Saakashvili, Yushchenko..." S. G. Kara-Murza wrote: "the position of the relatively new left-wing patriotic organization Rodina remains unclear," while he believed that "a prominent representative of Rodina, M. Delyagin, holds a radical orange position.".

Some journalists and bloggers tried to accuse M. Delyagin of simultaneously sympathizing with both right-wing and left-wing political ideologies, and even with supporters of liberalism in Russia (for his participation in the protest movement in Russia in 2012).

Pavel Danilin, analyzing Delyagin's book "Retribution on the Threshold. The Revolution in Russia: when, how, why", comes to the conclusion:

This is his weakest and most unsuccessful book, nevertheless, it is of interest to political scientists. Many of Delyagin's prophecies have not come true, and many things are happening according to a completely different scenario.

...To seize power, our dear revolutionaries: "it will be necessary to establish close and strong relations not only with the main (and traditionally hostile to each other) power structures, but also with the main (and also hostile to each other) groups existing within each of these structures." This is the finish line. Throughout the book, Delyagin talked about how the security forces are robbing the country, how they are tormenting Russia and how much trouble they are causing. And then he says that in order to win, revolutionaries must "lie down" under these security forces and surrender to them with a smile on their lips.

The online publication "Politgexogen" also wrote about this:

Delyagin's frightening predictions, as a rule, never come true. <...> the scarier the forecast coming from Delyagin, the more he is quoted, and the more often the name "Cassandra" flashes in the press. Rather, he is a theorist who has been broadcasting annually for ten years about the "inevitable crisis", followed by the "bloody chaos" that will surely follow if… If, apparently, Delyagin is not installed back in power. <...> Staying in the ranks of the anti-oligarchic party, Delyagin scientifically predicted the "catastrophic" consequences of the trial of Mikhail Khodorkovsky. Big deal, party principles

The online publication "Politgexogen" also wrote about this:In 2011, the famous economist Nikita Krichevsky accused Delyagin of plagiarizing his article. In 2012, when Delyagin, following the founder and head of the City Without Drugs Foundation, Yevgeny Roizman, publicly supported the criminal charges against opposition activist Taisiya Osipova, Alexander Averin, a member of the Other Russia party, accused Delyagin of lying and slander.: Later, Averin was also sentenced to a criminal term

On the eve of tomorrow's cassation, Taisiya Osipova was also uncovered by Delyagin. In the case of Taisiya Osipova, Mikhail Delyagin allowed himself to lie, slander and call for the death penalty of an innocent man. Delyagin is a man of legendary, epic cowardice. Michal Delyagin, a man with the face and figure of an eternally offended accountant and the psychology of a hyena (may this noble beast forgive comparisons with Delyagin), solemnly goes to

In 2020, the Ministry of Industry and Trade of the Russian Federation accused M. Delyagin of deliberately misleading Russian citizens about the alleged ban on the import of test systems for the diagnosis of coronavirus and the import of medical masks, as he said in an interview with IA Regnum.

Saliya Vapieva of the National Liberation Movement (NOD) wrote: "Delyagin is an enemy of the people, because he calls for voting against amendments to the Constitution, which should lead to the restoration of Russia's sovereignty."

Denies the existence of the coronavirus pandemic, emphasizing that the epidemic threshold has been exceeded worldwide in only 1 country (San Marino). He is an opponent of compulsory vaccination.

In April 2022, Delyagin and a group of associates introduced Bill No. 113045-8 on the Control of the Activities of Persons under Foreign Influence, according to which a "foreign agent" is a Russian citizen who does not receive foreign funding, but who "is under foreign influence in other forms." The bill was criticized because it "expands the space for arbitrariness."; even the head of the Constitutional Committee of the Federation Council, Andrei Klishas, spoke out against "frequent changes to the law.".

In June 2022, Delyagin and a group of associates introduced Bill № 140449-8, sharply restricting the holding of rallies, marches, demonstrations and assemblies. Since the authors proposed to include "religious premises, buildings and structures, as well as land plots on which such buildings and structures are located" in the list of places near which it is prohibited to hold meetings, marches, rallies and demonstrations, the Russian Orthodox Church expressed concern about this bill: the amendments contradict the law "On Freedom of Conscience and Religion." about religious associations». In addition, Delyagin's bill prohibits holding public actions near train stations and stations, as well as near buildings of public authorities.

=== Responses to criticism Mikhail Delyagin in 2012 commented on the accusations of "political omnivorousness" and "love for liberals." ===
:My job, my place in life, is to express the positive synthesis of values that has developed in Russian society.… Our society is one, and it's stupid to divide it into apartments – leftists here, patriots there, Democrats here. Near-political schizophrenics are easy to divide, but normal people don't.: they carry all the values. As for the love of liberals, I never speak out against democratic principles, but only against the perversion of these principles by liberal fundamentalists.

== International sanctions ==
Due to support for Russian aggression and violation of the territorial integrity of Ukraine during the Russian-Ukrainian war, he is under personal international sanctions from various countries.

On February 23, 2022, he was included in the sanctions lists of the European Union countries for actions and policies that undermine the territorial integrity, sovereignty and independence of Ukraine and further destabilize Ukraine.

On February 24, 2022, he was included in Canada's sanctions list of "close associates of the regime" for voting to recognize the independence of the "so-called republics in Donetsk and Lugansk".

On March 24, 2022, amid Russia's invasion of Ukraine, he was placed on the US sanctions list for "complicity in Putin's war" and "supporting the Kremlin's efforts to invade Ukraine.". The US State Department said that State Duma deputies are using their powers to persecute dissidents and political opponents, violating freedom of information, restricting human rights and fundamental freedoms of Russian citizens.

For similar reasons, it has been under UK sanctions since 11 March 2022. Under Swiss sanctions since 25 February 2022, under Australian sanctions since 26 February 2022, and under Japanese sanctions since 12 April 2022. By decree of Ukrainian President Volodymyr Zelenskyy dated 7 September 2022, sanctions were imposed on Ukraine. Has been under sanctions by New Zealand since 3 May 2022.

In March 2022, Delyagin, responding to the activity of the Azerbaijani military in the temporary deployment zone of the Russian peacekeeping corps in Nagorno-Karabakh, said on the air of the 60 Minutes program on the Russia 24 channel: “The Azerbaijanis really violated the ceasefire. And ours said that they retreated after we talked to them. And they officially stated that they did not leave the occupied territories. So this policy of aggression on the part of the American satellites and in this case Turkey, on the part of the Turkish proxies, which we call a state. This is a real danger today. And if we do not punish for this harshly and unequivocally, then why do we need the oil industry of Azerbaijan, a simple question? We do not need it, and it is extremely vulnerable. If people do not understand words, then they will probably have to understand actions. If we do not do this, we will not exist. This is the only question.”. Shortly before this, Delyagin conducted a poll on his Telegram channel about whether it is acceptable to "use tactical nuclear weapons to eliminate the oil industry of Azerbaijan" after reposting an article by political scientist Dimitriev, who considered this possibility. Delyagin was criticized for these words by the press secretary of the Russian president Dmitry Peskov, the official representative of the Russian Foreign Ministry Maria Zakharova, deputy chairperson of the State Duma commission on parliamentary ethics Nikolai Arefyev, as well as Delyagin's ally in the party, secretary of the presidium Oleg Shein. The leader of the party "A Just Russia - For Truth" Sergei Mironov said that Delyagin's words about Azerbaijan do not reflect the party's position. The Azerbaijani embassy in Russia called Delyagin's speech "delusional and provocative"; deputies of the Azerbaijani parliament Mikhail Zabelin and Rasim Musabekov also criticized Delyagin's behavior. The Federal National-Cultural Autonomy of Azerbaijanis in Russia called on the Prosecutor General's Office of Russia to initiate a criminal case against Delyagin under Article 354 of the Criminal Code of the Russian Federation (public calls to unleash an aggressive war), stating, in particular, that "such statements and actions cannot in any way be called adequate, and the person who voiced and wrote this can even less be called mentally balanced." Delyagin later apologized to "everyone who was frightened or offended, or insulted" by his words, noting that he hoped "that some part of the Azerbaijani bureaucracy will behave reasonably" and reported that, "as far as I can judge from the existing reaction, the call for respect for Russian peacekeepers and their difficult work was heard by its addressees." Following this, the Prosecutor General's Office of Azerbaijan initiated a criminal case against the deputy under Articles 101.2 (call for an aggressive war), 214.2.3. (terrorism - threat of use of weapons), 283.2.1 and 283.2.2 (national, social and religious hatred) and declared him wanted internationally through Interpol with the choice of a preventive measure in the form of detention in custody.

== Publications ==
The author of more than a thousand articles in Russia, the USA, Germany, France, Finland, China, India and elsewhere, the author of 16 monographs, the most famous of which are "The Economy of Non-Payments" (1997), "The Ideology of Revival" (2000), "The World Crisis. General Theory of Globalization" (2003), "Russia after Putin. Is an "Orange-Green" Revolution Inevitable in Russia?" (2005), "Drive of Humanity" (2008), "The Crisis of Humanity. Will Russia Survive the Un-Russian Turmoil?" (2010). Head of the authors' collective of the book "The Practice of Globalization: Games and Rules of the New Era" (2000), in collaboration with V. Sheyanov he wrote the book "The World Inside Out. How the Economic Crisis Will End for Russia" (2009).

Developer of the hypothesis of globalization as a process of complex transformation of the individual, society and global competition by information technologies. Introduced the terms high-hume, "meta-technologies", "closing technologies". Theorist of the transformation of the market society into a "society of social platforms", integration of the systemic and subjective approaches.

Studies the rise, decline and transformation of the British Empire.

Hirsch index: Scopus — 1, Web of Science (Publons) — 0, elibrary.ru — 21, РИНЦ — 19, RINTS taking into account publications in journals only — 11, RINTS core — 6.

=== Books ===
1. Делягин М. Г. Куда идёт «великая» Россия? (1994);
2. Делягин М. Г. Россия в депрессии : Экономика : анализ проблем и перспектив. — 2-е изд., перераб. и доп. — М : Б. и., 1997. — 193 с. (Вестник банковского дела / Рос. ассоц. пром.-строит. банков (Россия); № 3: Спец. вып.)
3. Делягин М. Г. Экономика неплатежей: как и почему мы будем жить завтра. — 3-е изд., перераб. и доп. — М. : Б. и., 1997. — 397 с.
4. Практика глобализации: игры и правила новой эпохи / Братимов О. В., Горский Ю. М., Делягин М. Г., Коваленко А. А.; Под ред. М. Г. Делягина; Ин-т проблем глобализации (ИПРОГ). — М. : Инфра-М, 2000. — 342 с. ISBN 978-5-16-000379-5
5. Делягин М. Г. Идеология возрождения: как мы уйдём из нищеты и маразма: Эскиз политики ответственного правительства России. — М. : Форум, 2000. — 183 с. ISBN 978-5-8199-0010-9
6. Делягин М. Г. Мировой кризис. Общая теория глобализации: Курс лекций / Ин-т проблем глобализации (ИПРОГ). — 3-е изд., перераб. и доп. — М.: Инфра-М, 2003. — 767 с. ISBN 978-5-16-001603-0
7. Делягин М. Г. Россия после Путина: неизбежна ли в России «оранжево-зелёная» революция? — М.: Вече, 2005. — 413 с. (Ракурс). ISBN 978-5-9533-0720-8
8. Делягин М. Г. Возмездие на пороге. Революция в России: когда, как, зачем. — М.: Новости, 2007. — 447 с. (Максим Калашников рекомендует). ISBN 978-5-7020-1195-0
9. Делягин М. Г. Россия для россиян. — М.: Алгоритм, 2007. — 366 с. (Против всех). ISBN 978-5-9265-0436-8 (переиздание в 2009);
10. Делягин М. Г. Основы внешней политики России: матрица интересов / Ин-т проблем глобализации. 3-е изд., перераб. и доп. — М.: ИНФРА-М, 2007. — 79 с. ISBN 978-5-16-002983-2
11. Делягин М. Г. Реванш России. — М.: Яуза: Эксмо, 2008. — 446 с. (Пятая Империя). ISBN 978-5-699-26155-0
12. Делягин М. Г. Драйв человечества: глобализация и мировой кризис. — М.: Вече, 2008. — 527 с. ISBN 978-5-9533-3539-3
13. Делягин М. Г., Шеянов В. В. Мир наизнанку. Чем закончится экономический кризис для России? — М.: Эксмо, 2009. — 351 с. (Библиотека Коммерсантъ). ISBN 978-5-699-34129-0
14. Делягин М. Г. Как самому победить кризис. Наука экономить, наука рисковать: простые советы! — М.: АСТ: Астрель, 2009. — 477 с. (Красная обложка) ISBN 978-5-17-058456-7
15. Делягин М. Г. Дураки, дороги и другие беды России: беседы о главном. — М.: Вече, 2010. — 334 с. (Русский вопрос). ISBN 978-5-9533-4548-4
16. Делягин М. Г., Бобраков О. А. Что скрывают послания Президента. — М.: Эксмо: Алгоритм, 2010. — 239 с. (Политические расследования). ISBN 978-5-699-44928-6
17. Делягин М. Г. Путь России: новая опричнина, или почему не нужно «валить из Рашки». — М.: Эксмо, 2011. — 414 с. (Путь России). ISBN 978-5-699-48086-9
18. Делягин М. Г., Шеянов В. В. Русский космос: победы и поражения. — М.: Эксмо, 2011. — 155 с. (Люди в космосе). ISBN 978-5-699-48181-1 : 4000 экз.
19. Делягин М. Г. 100-долларовое правительство. А если цена на нефть упадёт? — М.: Алгоритм, 2012. — 207 с. (Власть в тротиловом эквиваленте). ISBN 978-5-4438-0098-1
20. Делягин М. Г., Глазьев С. Ю., Фурсов А. И. Стратегия «Большого рывка». — М.: Алгоритм, 2013. — 239 с. (Меч Империи). ISBN 978-5-4438-0543-6
21. Делягин М. Г. Время побеждать: беседы о главном. — М.: Книжный мир, 2014. — 430 с. (Коллекция Изборского клуба). ISBN 978-5-8041-0647-9
22. Делягин М. Г. Россия перед лицом истории. Конец эпохи национального предательства? — М.: Книжный мир, 2015. — 382 с. — (Коллекция Изборского клуба). ISBN 978-5-8041-0746-9
23. Делягин М. Г., Шеянов В. В. Империя в прыжке. Китай изнутри. Как и для чего «алеет Восток». Главное событие XXI века. Возможности и риски для России. — М.: Книжный мир, 2015. — 671 с. ISBN 978-5-8041-0758-2
24. Уроки Второй мировой. Восток и Запад: как пожать плоды Победы?: сборник / А. А. Проханов, В. Ю. Винников, Ю. В. Тавровский, А. И. Фурсов, Л. Г. Ивашов, С. Ф. Черняховский, Ш. З. Султанов, М. Г. Делягин, Г. Г. Малинецкий [и др.]. — М.: Книжный мир, 2015. — 316 с. (XX: век войн и революций). — (Коллекция Изборского клуба)
25. Делягин М. Г. Преодоление либеральной чумы. Почему и как мы победим? — М.: Книжный мир, 2015. — 509 с. (Коллекция Изборского клуба). ISBN 978-5-8041-0793-3 : 1000 экз.
26. Делягин М. Г. Светочи тьмы: физиология либерального клана: от Гайдара и Березовского до Собчак и Навального / Ин-т проблем глобализации. — М.: Книжный мир, 2016. — 794 с. — (Серия «Коллекция Изборского клуба»). ISBN 978-5-8041-0827-5 : 3000 экз.
27. Делягин М. Г. Британские элиты: факторы глобального превосходства. От Плантагенетов до Скрипалей. — М.: Книжный мир, 2019. — 257 с. — ISBN 978-5-6042521-2-3
28. Делягин М. Г. (2019). Конец эпохи. Осторожно: двери открываются! Том 1. Общая теория глобализации. М.: Книжный мир. p. 832. ISBN 978-5-6041887-7-4.
29. Делягин М. Г. Конец эпохи: осторожно, двери открываются! Том 2. Специальная теория глобализации. — М.: Политиздат, Книжный мир, 2020. — 812 с. — ISBN 978-5-6043473-9-3
30. Делягин М. Г. Жизнь в катастрофе: победи кризис сам. — М.: ПОЛИТИЗДАТ, Книжный мир, 2020. — 512 с. — ISBN 978-5-6044601-9-1

Editor

- Д. В. Ольшанский; М. Г. Делягина; Институт проблем глобализации, eds. (2006). Кремлядь, или Наследники Путина: альманах российской публицистики. М.: Политиздат. p. 192. ISBN 978-5-903366-01-9. (обл.)

== Journalism ==
=== Broadcast media ===
- Радиопередача «Государство и мы» («Народное радио»)
- Радиопередача «Парадокс» (Финам FM), тема «Экономика России достигла дна? Что будет дальше?»
- Программа «Пятница с Михаилом Делягиным» на Радио КП

=== Print and electronic media ===
- «Московский комсомолец»
- «Свободная пресса»
- «Комсомольская правда»
- «Аргументы недели»
- «„Ежедневный журнал“».
- «Актуальные комментарии»

== See also ==
- Personal site
- IPROG site
- Maxim Kalashnikov : The battle for skies
