= All-Russia People's Front =

Political coalition in Russia

People's Front Народный фронт
- Abbreviation: NF (Since 2023) ONF (Before 2023)
- Leader: Vladimir Putin
- Ruling body: Central headquarters
- Co-chairs: Sergey Kogogin; Alexey Komissarov; Leonid Roshal; Elena Tsunaeva; Yelena Shmelyova
- Chairman of the Central Audit Commission: Anatoly Karpov
- Chairman of the Central Executive Committee: Mikhail Kuznetsov
- Founder: Vladimir Putin
- Founded: 6 May 2011 (15 years, 184 days)
- Headquarters: 40th Building, Mosfilmovskaya Street, Moscow, Russia. 119285
- Membership (2018): 125,000
- Ideology: Statism; Social conservatism National conservatism Russian conservatism Russian nationalism
- Political position: Big tent
- Member parties: United Russia; A Just Russia; Rodina; National Liberation Movement; Progressive Socialist Party of Ukraine; We Are Together with Russia
- Colors: White, Blue, Red (Russian national colors)
- Slogan: Мы — за Россию! ('We are for Russia!')
- Seats in the Federation Council: 146 / 170
- Seats in the State Duma: 340 / 450

Website
- onf.ru

People's Front (Russian: Народный фронт, romanized: Narodnyy front, NF), formally All-Russia People's Front (Note: Officially, People's Front "For Russia" Russian: Народный фронт «За Россию», romanized: Narodnyy front «Za Rossiyu») (Russian: Общероссийский народный фронт, romanized: Obshcherossiyskiy narodnyy front, ONF), is a political coalition in Russia started in 2011 by then-Prime Minister of Russia Vladimir Putin to provide the United Russia political party with "new ideas, new suggestions and new faces". The ONF aims to forge formal alliances between United Russia (the ruling party from 2001 onwards) and numerous Russian non-governmental organizations. On 12 June 2013 the ONF founding conference elected Putin (President of Russia from 2012) as the Front's leader.

== History ==
The All-Russia People's Front was established on the initiative of then-Prime Minister, Vladimir Putin. The proposal for its creation was put forward on May 6, 2011, at an interregional conference of the United Russia party in Volgograd. In his speech, he noted:

This form of pooling the efforts of all political forces is used in various countries by a wide range of political groups—left-wing, right-wing, and patriotic alike; it serves as a tool for uniting like-minded political forces. I would like to see the party, other political parties, and civic organizations—in short, all those united by a desire to improve life in this country—come together. This coalition could be called the 'All-Russia People's Front'

On May 7, 2011, during a meeting between Vladimir Putin and representatives of civic organizations at Novo-Ogaryovo, a coordinating council for the All-Russia People's Front was established. Participants in the meeting included representatives from organizations such as Opora, the Russian Union of Industrialists and Entrepreneurs, the Federation of Independent Trade Unions of Russia, Delovaya Rossiya, the Union of Pensioners of Russia, the Young Guard of United Russia, the Council of the All-Russia Public Organization of Veterans of the Russian Armed Forces, the interregional motorists' organization "Freedom of Choice", the Russian Union of Veterans of Afghanistan, the Union of Transport Workers of Russia (Russian: Союза транспортников России), and the Union of Women of Russia, as well as regional groups such as the Union of Agrarians and "Tatarstan — New Century". During the meeting, Vladimir Putin outlined the key areas of focus for the All-Russia People's Front:

We need to urgently defuse the 'mine' that Lenin planted under the USSR; we need to shift the economy onto an innovative track while simultaneously addressing social issues in an effective and fair manner—these are the two primary motivations that served as the starting point for the proposal to establish the ONF.

In addition to participants from Russia, public organizations from Estonia, Latvia, Moldova, Belarus, and Finland also joined the ONF. An international wing—dubbed "International Russia"—was formed from these foreign-based compatriots who joined the movement.

By May 2011, hundreds of businesses had enlisted their workforces in the organization, including around 40,000 from the Siberian Business Union.

"Action Forum", November 22, 2016

Following the 2012 presidential election, Vladimir Putin—now serving as head of state—held his first meeting with the core members of the All-Russia People’s Front at Novo-Ogaryovo on October 18. He stated that his initial motivation for creating the ONF was less about political maneuvering and more about the need to establish a broad public coalition. During the meeting, the President outlined the primary objectives for the movement: monitoring the implementation of his presidential decrees and directives, as well as combating corruption. By that time, the ONF had come to include representatives from a wide array of groups—such as youth, women's, and labor organizations (including the Federation of Independent Trade Unions of Russia, the Russian Pensioners’ Union, and the Union of Women of Russia)—as well as professional associations (like the National Medical Chamber and the motorists' advocacy group "Ruined Roads") and business communities (including the Russian Union of Industrialists and Entrepreneurs, Delovaya Rossiya and Opora).

The founding congress of the All-Russia People's Front took place in Moscow at the Manege on June 11–12, 2013. Delegates adopted the movement's core founding documents—including the ONF Charter, which emphasized its non-partisan nature—and established the ONF Central Headquarters. The official name of the public movement was also established: "All-Russia People's Front 'For Russia'." During the congress, the front's Central Staff was elected: film director Stanislav Govorukhin, Delovaya Rossiya, co-chairman Aleksandr Galushka and State Duma member Olga Timofeeva. Russian President Vladimir Putin was elected as the leader of the ONF. In his address to the founding congress, he noted:

The All-Russia People's Front must truly become a broad public movement, ensuring that all citizens of the country have the opportunity to set their own—that is, the people's—objectives, see them through to completion, and push forward issues that sometimes get bogged down in a bureaucratic quagmire. It should allow people to submit proposals directly—proposals that can subsequently be transformed into laws and state policy decisions. People must be empowered to utilize existing tools for influencing public processes, to seek out new ones, and to apply them effectively. It is necessary to bring forward new individuals and new candidates, to participate in elections, and to nominate people who are well-suited for such roles. But most importantly, for this work to remain vibrant, it must be directly connected to the people—to their interests and to the resolution of the problems they face.

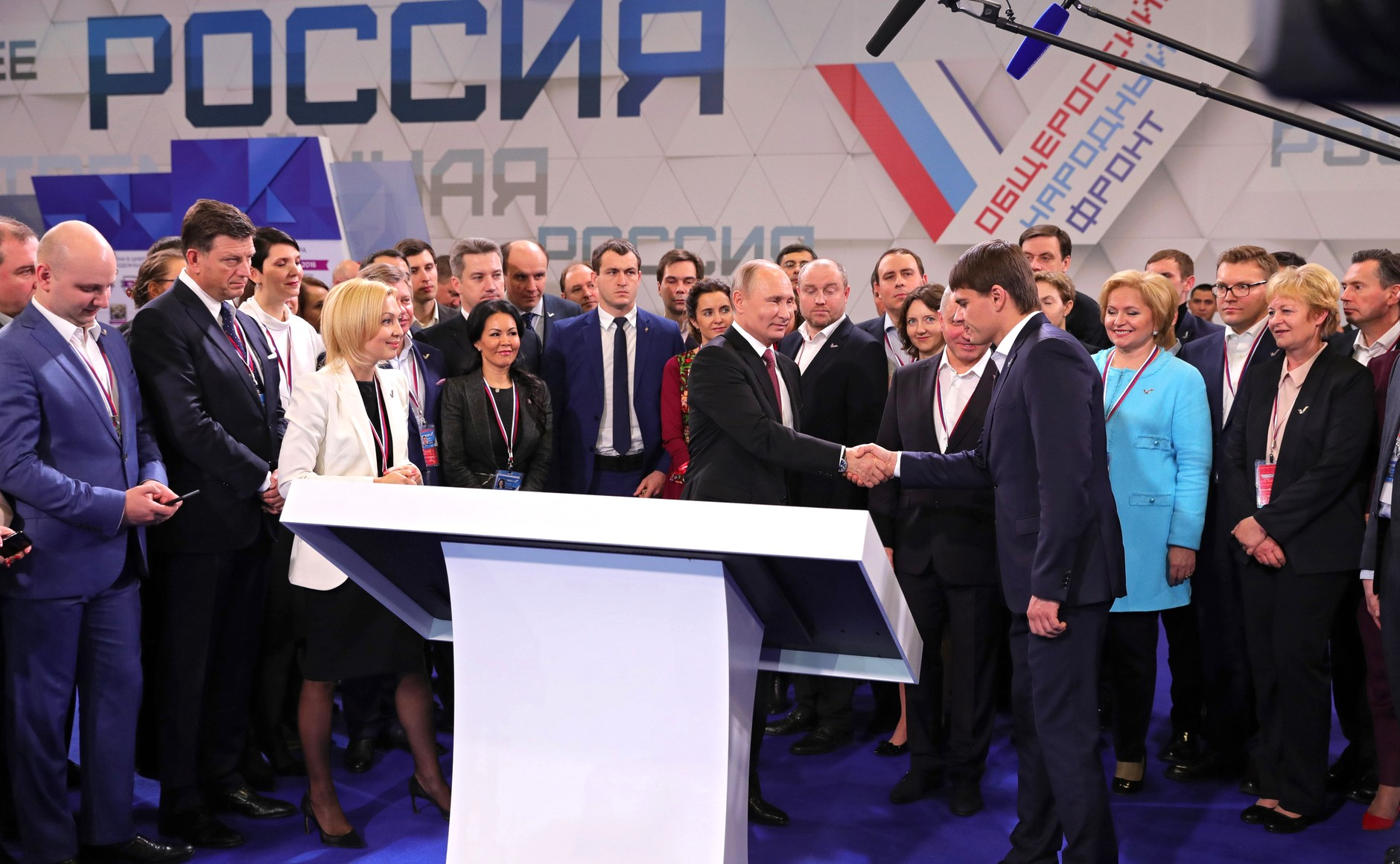
Russian President Vladimir Putin at a plenary session of the All-Russia People's Front. December 19, 2017

On June 14, the charter and manifesto of the All-Russia People's Front movement were published. According to the founding documents, the movement is open to citizens of the Russian Federation who are at least 18 years old, meet the legal requirements for participants in public associations under current Russian law, accept the movement's charter, and have expressed support for its goals. Participation in—and withdrawal from—the All-Russia People's Front is voluntary.

According to the Charter, the Front's goal is "promotion of unity and civil solidarity in the name of Russia's historical success"; the country's development as a free, strong and sovereign state with a robust economy; fast economic growth; and reliance on the family. On the list of the ONF founders were 480 people, including trade union activists, workers, scientists, culture workers, athletes, businessmen, farm and medical workers and politicians.

On 4 December 2013, the Action Forum was held. The conference, which ran until 6 December, discussed the process of implementing reforms in healthcare, economy, community services, education and culture. The meeting held numerous round tables on the president's so-called "May Decrees" and tackled internal agenda items.

In January 2014, the Front registered its first regional office in the city of Lipetsk, located about 440 kilometers south of Moscow, with Russia's Justice Ministry.

In early April 2014, Alexey Anisimov was elected head of the All-Russia People’s Front executive committee. He had previously served as deputy chief of the Presidential Directorate for Internal Policy, where he was responsible for regional policy and the department for social monitoring. His remit also included overseeing elections at all levels across Russia’s constituent entities, as well as supervising the "People’s Front". Following his election, Anisimov stated that he viewed the fight against corruption and the monitoring of governors' activities as among the primary objectives of the ONF.

On April 10, 2014, the second meeting between Russian President and All-Russia People’s Front leader Vladimir Putin and the movement's core members took place. During the meeting, representatives from the People’s Front’s regional headquarters briefed the head of state on what they considered to be the most pressing issues facing the country and put forward a number of proposals.

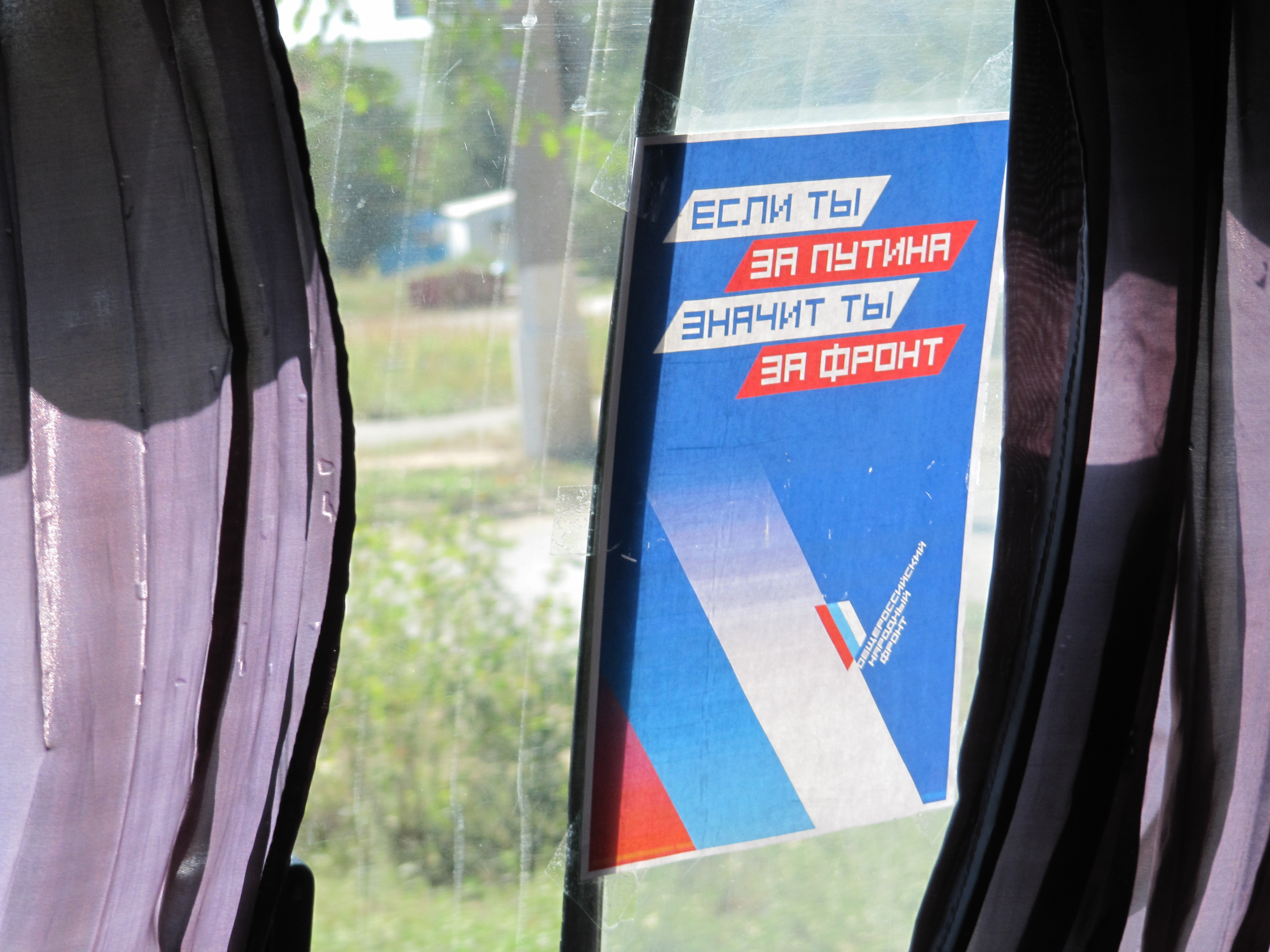
Poster of the People's Front in September 2011

From April 23–25, 2014, the ONF organized the "Truth and Justice" media forum in St. Petersburg for independent regional and local media outlets, inviting independent journalists from all across Russia. During the event, a decision was made to establish the "Truth and Justice" Foundation for the Support of Independent Regional and Local Media, as well as a Legal Support Center for Journalists.

Between August 10 and 20, the ONF held the "Tavrida" International Youth Forum in Crimea. Ahead of the forum’s opening, the People’s Front’s "Russia-2014" expedition—which traveled from Vladivostok to Sevastopol—concluded; its objective was to monitor the implementation of the "May decrees" and the President’s directives on the ground.

By 2014, the regional headquarters and executive committees of the People’s Front had been fully established across all constituent entities of the Russian Federation, including Crimea and Sevastopol. On November 17–18, 2014, the All-Russia People’s Front held its second "Forum of Actions", which reviewed the organization's work over the preceding year.

On March 11, 2015, the ONF Central Headquarters decided to establish the ONF Center for Public Monitoring of Environmental and Forest Protection Issues. This new initiative brought together experts, scientists, public figures, and environmental specialists dedicated to combating mismanagement and corruption in the forestry sector, as well as addressing illegal logging and other environmental challenges..

From April 25–28, 2015, the second ONF media forum, titled "Truth and Justice," took place in St. Petersburg. The forum focused on pressing regional issues and professional matters concerning the development of independent journalism in Russia. As part of ongoing efforts to support regional media, the ONF organized a special track for young journalists from regional and local outlets during the "Tavrida" All-Russian Youth Educational Forum, held from August 27 to September 2, 2015, on the Bakalskaya Spit in Crimea.

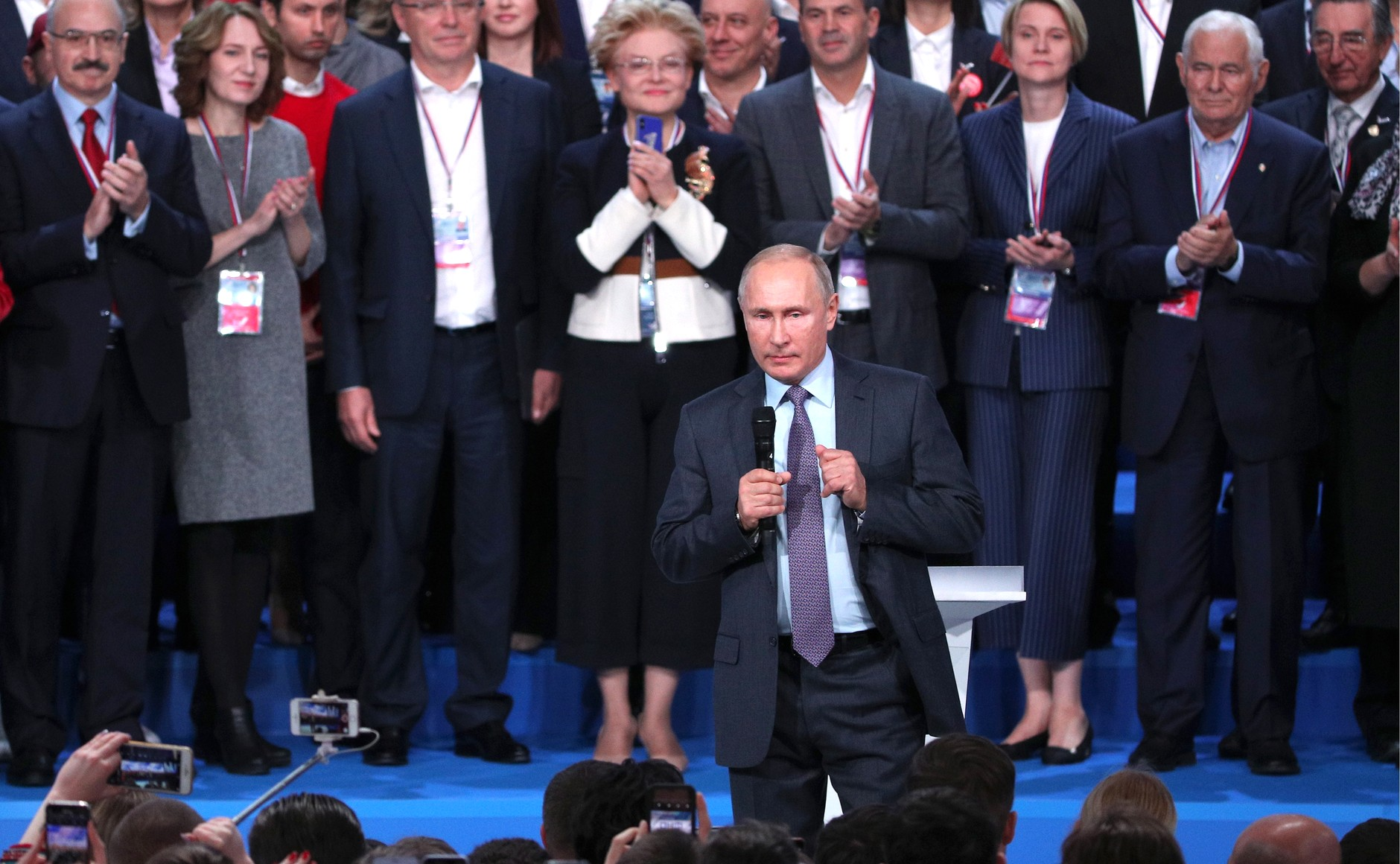
Putin at a congress of the People's Front, November 2018

On November 27, 2015, a third meeting between ONF activists and Russian President Vladimir Putin was held at the Novo-Ogaryovo residence. Following the event, the Prosecutor General's Office, the Accounts Chamber of Russia and the Federal Taxation Service were tasked with auditing the efficiency of budget expenditures by a number of state-owned companies.

On February 25, 2016, a conference on environmental issues and forest protection, organized by the All-Russia People's Front, took place in Irkutsk. The event brought together over 300 participants, including civic activists, environmentalists, federal and regional ONF experts on forest protection from Siberia and the Russian Far East, representatives from relevant government ministries and agencies, regional authorities, and journalists. During the conference’s plenary session, a set of public proposals was developed to address challenges related to forest protection nationwide and environmental issues in the Lake Baikal region.

From April 4 to 7, 2016, the All-Russia People's Front held a media forum for independent regional and local news outlets in Saint Petersburg, titled "Truth and Justice." The event drew more than 450 participants, including journalists from every region of the country, bloggers, heads of federal media organizations, and leaders of relevant government ministries and agencies.

On April 24–25, 2016, an "Action Forum: Regions" was held in Yoshkar-Ola. The forum was attended by approximately 450 people, including ONF activists from 21 regions across the Volga, Ural, and Northwestern federal districts, as well as federal and regional experts from the People's Front, representatives of the executive branch, and journalists.

Representatives of the ONF authored a section on the effectiveness of government decision-making for the 2016 parliamentary election platform of the United Russia party.

Following the September 2016 parliamentary elections to the State Duma, approximately 80 ONF members secured seats in the 7th convocation of the State Duma, having been elected either through party lists or in single-mandate constituencies. In the new convocation, they secured seven out of 26 committees, 16 positions as deputy committee chairs, and the post of Deputy Speaker.

On November 22, 2016, a concluding Forum of Actions took place in Moscow, dedicated to reviewing the results of the State Duma elections and the movement’s work over the preceding three years. According to the organizers, more than 1,000 people attended the event, including delegates from every region of Russia, representatives of executive authorities, and members of parliament. Russian President Vladimir Putin delivered a speech at the forum's plenary session.

In 2017, the movement focused its efforts on addressing pressing environmental issues. Throughout the year, four interregional environmental conferences were held: in Rostov-on-Don (March 23), Kaliningrad (May 18), Kirov (June 29), and Ulan-Ude (September 6). In addition to the movement's core members, the events were attended by environmentalists, federal and regional officials, and various experts.

From August 26 to 30, 2017, the ONF organized a special track for young journalists at the "Tavrida" All-Russian Youth Educational Forum, held on the Bakalskaya Spit in Crimea. More than 300 participants took part, including journalists and bloggers from across the country, as well as media editors-in-chief and others. Each day of the program for these young regional journalists was dedicated to one of the ONF’s priority projects. On August 30, 2017, at the "Tavrida" camp in Crimea, the All-Russia People's Front unveiled its youth wing, Molodyozhka ONF (ONF Youth), with Igor Kastyukevich appointed as its head.

In January 2018, ONF members participated in collecting signatures to support Vladimir Putin's candidacy in the presidential election. At the same time, more than 300 representatives from the movement joined Putin’s regional campaign headquarters. Among the co-chairs of these regional campaign offices were trusted representatives of Vladimir Putin drawn from the ranks of ONF activists and experts.

On November 4, 2018, Putin tasked the ONF with monitoring the implementation of his presidential decree, "On National Goals and Strategic Objectives of the Development of the Russian Federation for the Period up to 2024"—specifically, assessing how the changes brought about by the national projects affect the quality of life of citizens. A month later, "Russia Aimed at the Future" Action Forum, held in Moscow on December 18–19, 2018. In total, more than 4,000 people took part in the event. Russian President Vladimir Putin held a meeting with the People's Front experts.

On December 17, 2018, at a meeting of the ONF Central Headquarters, Mikhail Razvozhayev was confirmed as the head of the ONF Executive Committee. Prior to this appointment, Razvozhayev had served as the acting head of the Republic of Khakassia.

On January 10, 2019, the ONF announced the launch of a website providing official information on donations collected—and how those funds were spent—to assist those affected by the domestic gas explosion that occurred on December 31 at 164 Karl Marx Avenue in Magnitogorsk.

From May 14–16, 2019, a media forum for independent regional and local news outlets, titled "Truth and Justice", took place in Sochi. More than 500 people participated, including winners of the "Truth and Justice" and "Airports Named After Great Compatriots" journalism contests, as well as journalists, bloggers, editors-in-chief, and executives from federal media organizations. The forum featured an exhibition dedicated to the People's Front’s various projects. Additionally, a consultation desk was set up by the Center for Legal Support for Journalists, where experts presented an updated legal handbook for media professionals. Russian President Vladimir Putin attended the forum’s plenary session. On July 11, 2019, Russian President Vladimir Putin appointed Mikhail Razvozhayev, head of the All-Russia People's Front Executive Committee, as the acting governor of Sevastopol. On September 13, 2019, by a decision of the ONF Central Headquarters, Mikhail Kuznetsov—who served as vice-governor and chief of staff to the governor of the Moscow Region—was appointed head of the All-Russia People's Front Executive Committee.

On October 21, 2019, the Supreme Court of Russia, following a lawsuit by the Ministry of Justice, liquidated the Agrarian Party of Russia for insufficient participation in the elections for 7 years, thus also ending its participation in the Front.

On March 18, 2020, the All-Russia People's Front, through its volunteer headquarters and in collaboration with partners, launched a hotline to assist the elderly and individuals with limited mobility. The hotline served as a centralized hub for various types of support, including processing requests for the delivery of groceries and medications, as well as the payment of utility bills. It also handled inquiries from healthcare workers, provided psychological support to the public, and offered consultations on topics such as support measures for families with children, credit holidays, the resolution of labor disputes, and the repatriation of Russian citizens from abroad.

Following the onset of the coronavirus pandemic, the youth wing of the People's Front established multi-ethnic rapid response teams across Russia’s regions. These teams assisted medical staff in repurposing hospitals into infectious disease wards and observation units, delivered personal protective equipment, staffed call centers, brought COVID-19 medications to patients undergoing treatment at home, and provided aid to the elderly and those with limited mobility.

In April 2020, the People's Front organized a volunteer team under the banner "#SvoikhNeBrosayem" ("We Don't Abandon Our Own"). Working in coordination with the Ministry of Foreign Affairs, the Ministry of Digital Development, and various airlines, the team helped Russian citizens secure spots on evacuation flights. Since the project’s inception, these volunteers have assisted over 1,500 Russian citizens in returning home from 60 countries and provided consultations to more than 6,500 individuals.

Since 2020, the People's Front has implemented several initiatives, including "MnogoDaryu" ("Giving Much"), which helps large families obtain computers and laptops for educational purposes, and "#PRO_NEE" ("About Her"), which provides support to mothers raising children with developmental disabilities. "Runway" ("Vzletnaya Polosa") — an initiative designed to help children in the care of relatives, the state, or foster families prepare for university admission.

On December 21, 2021, the 4th Congress of the All-Russia People's Front took place. A new Central Headquarters, consisting of 78 members, was established. The Central Headquarters reappointed Mikhail Kuznetsov as the head of the People's Front Executive Committee.

In February 2022, the People's Front began providing assistance to people displaced from the Luhansk and Donetsk People's Republics. On February 19, 2022, a joint "#WeAreTogether" (#MyVmeste) headquarters was established in Rostov-on-Don, coordinated by Boris Podolny, Deputy Head of the People's Front Executive Committee for Regional Operations.

In 2022, a key focus of the People's Front became its humanitarian mission in the Donetsk and Luhansk Republics, as well as the Zaporizhzhia and Kherson regions. In collaboration with partner organizations, the People's Front established 6 humanitarian hubs and opened 955 collection points for humanitarian aid. A system was set up to provide civilians with a regular supply of water and bread. Through the "Aid Train for Donbas" initiative, more than 2,400 tons of humanitarian supplies were delivered from 60 regions across Russia. In June 2022, the "Everything for Victory!" ("Vsyo dlya pobedy!") project was launched to support the defenders of Donbas.

== Member organizations ==
Name (abbreviation)	Ideology	Position	Leader	State Duma	Federation Council	Status
United Russia; Единая Россия	Conservatism (Russian); Statism; Cultural nationalism (Russian)	Big-tent	Dmitry Medvedev, Vladimir Putin, Sergei Shoigu	324 / 450	142 / 170	In Government
A Just Russia; Справедливая Россия	Social democracy Russian nationalism Social conservatism Eurasianism	Centre to centre-left	Sergey Mironov, Zakhar Prilepin, Gennady Semigin	28 / 450	4 / 170	Support for government
Rodina; Родина	Russian nationalism Russian conservatism Right-wing populism	Far-right	Aleksey Zhuravlyov	1 / 450	0 / 170	Support for government
National Liberation Movement; Национально-освободительное движение	Russian nationalism Ultranationalism; Eurasianism	Far-right	Yevgeny Fyodorov	1 / 450	0 / 170	Support for government
Abroad members
Progressive Socialist Party of Ukraine; Прогрессивная социалистическая партия Украины; Прогресивна соціалістична партія України	National Bolshevism; Russophilia; Left-wing populism Social conservatism	Far-left	Nataliya Vitrenko	0 / 450 (seats in Verkhovna Rada of Ukraine)		not in Russia, not in government of Ukraine; Banned in Ukraine since 20 March 2022
We Are Together with Russia; Мы вместе с Россией	Russophilia; Putinism	Far-right	Vladimir Rogov			

The All-Russia People's Front also includes the following organisations:

- Federation of Independent Trade Unions of Russia
- Russian Union of Industrialists and Entrepreneurs
- All-Russian Public Organization of Veterans of the Russian Armed Forces
- Young Guard of United Russia
- Siberian Business Union
- All-Russian Public Civil-Patriotic Movement
- Union of Pensioners of Russia
- Union of Transport Workers of Russia
- Union of Russia Women
- Killed Roads movement
- Support of Russia

== Election results ==
=== Presidential ===
Election	Candidate	First round		Second round		Result
Election	Candidate	Votes	%	Votes	%	Result
2018	Vladimir Putin	56,430,712	76.69	—N/a		Won
2024	Vladimir Putin	76,277,708	88.48	—N/a		Won

== Analysis ==
According to a 2013 article by the BBC, the ONF may replace United Russia in the future, which was the probable reason for its establishment.

== See also ==
- Popular front
- National Front of the German Democratic Republic
- United front (China)
