= The Broken Sword of the Empire =

1998 book by Maksim Kalašnikov

- Author: Maxim Kalashnikov
- Original title: Сломанный меч Империи (Slomanniy Mech Imperii)
- Cover artist: G. Zhivotov
- Language: Russian
- Publisher: The Great Resistance
- Publication date: 1998
- Publication place: Russia
- Pages: 560
- ISBN: 5-89747-027-8
- OCLC: 50078689
- Followed by: The Battle for Skies

The Broken Sword of the Empire (Russian: Сломанный меч Империи) is a book by Russian author Maxim Kalashnikov, first published in 1998 by the Great Resistance publisher. It is the first part of a historical, geopolitical and economic series by the author.

The Broken Sword of the Empire is a historical/geopolitical analysis of Russia in the period from the 1930s to the 1990s. The whole book is constructed as an answer to the question “Who was winning the Third World Cold War?”

== Structure ==
The 560 pages of the book are divided in 26 chapters, and are organized as follows:

- First part : the author exposes the problematic and central theme by a modern example (e.g.: the role of Aviation in the 1991 Gulf War )
- Second part : Kalashnikov then shows how the technology/field evolved through the Arms Race, comparing the East, West and sometimes Axis developments.
- Third part : He then compares the different technical achievements. Usually, Kalashnikov shows the potential that a particular technology had before the collapse of the Soviet Union.
- Fourth part : the author then criticises the post-Soviet government for disregarding that technology or field (e.g.: Modern Russia and the First Chechen War)

== Criticism ==
Maxim Kalashnikov has been criticised for not being objective in his books.

== Achievements ==
It is true that the elements exposed in the book are very hard to find anywhere else, like the AYaKS aerospaceship programme, the Soviet plasma anti-friction generator, the Ekranoplan programme, and names of Soviets that fought in Korea, Cuba, Algeria, Vietnam, Egypt, Somalia, Syria, Afghanistan but also on the territory of the Soviet Union. To Kalashnikov, those people were the "Hammer and Sword" of the Soviet nation. They were previously unknown in the Soviet era because of the secrecy policy.
