= Nozzle =

Device used to direct the flow of a fluid

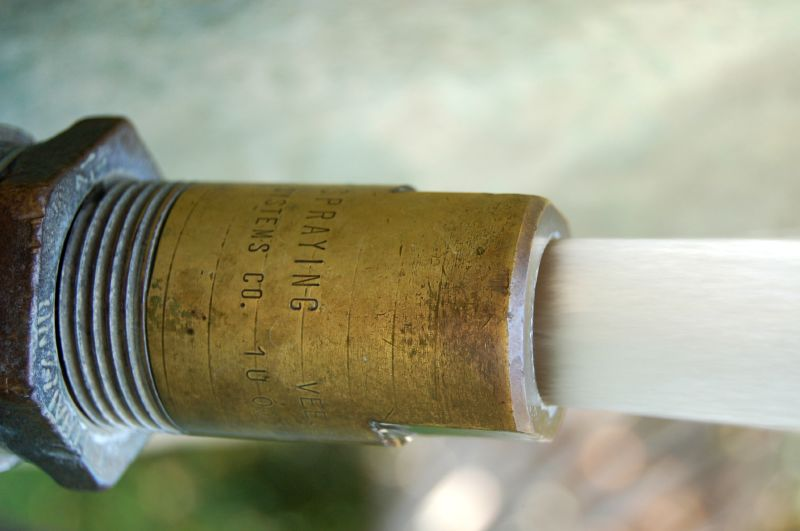
A water nozzle

Center-pivot irrigation sprinkler nozzles, as used in crop irrigation

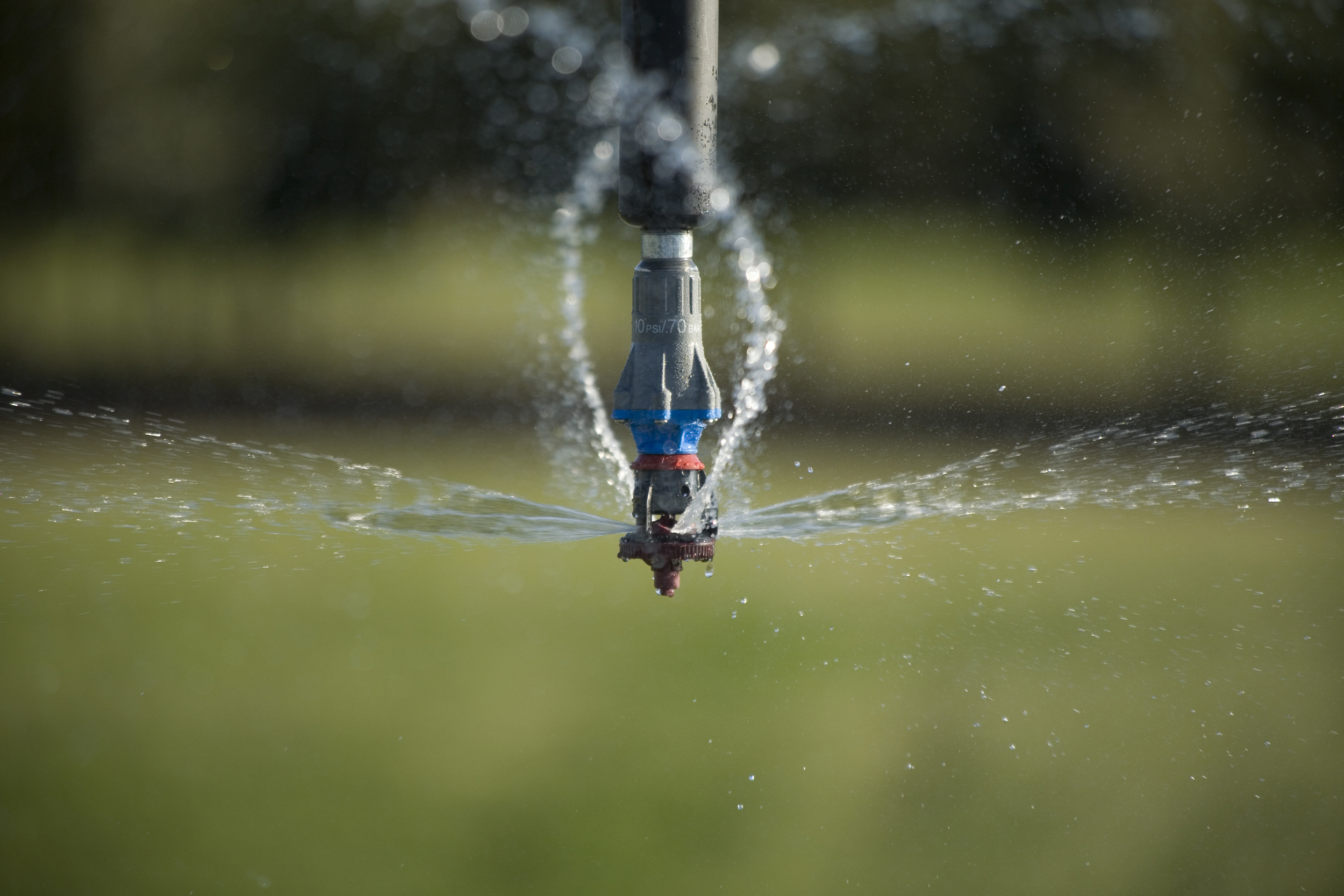
Rotator-style sprinkler

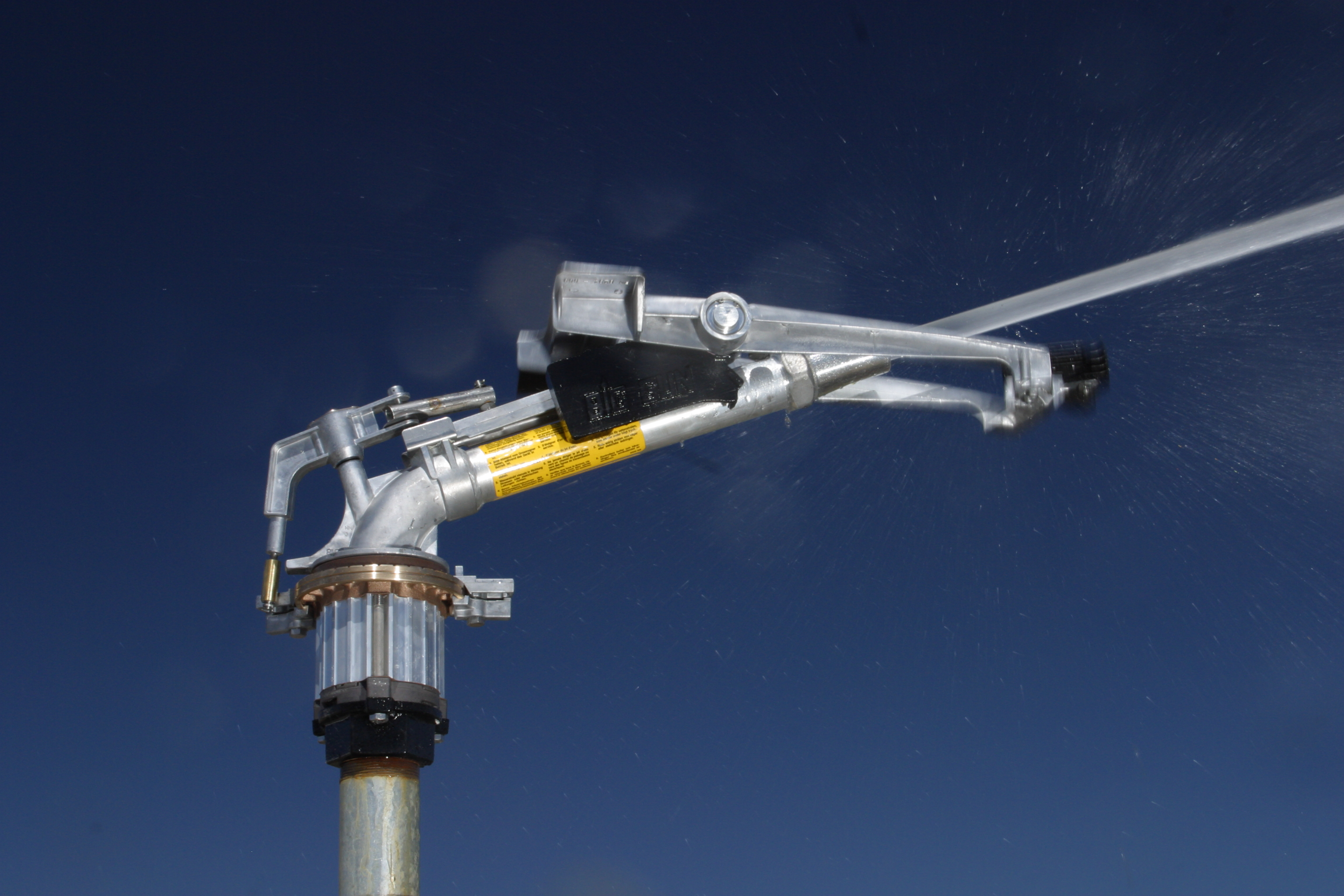
End-gun–style sprinkler

A nozzle is a device designed to control the direction or characteristics of a fluid flow (specially to increase velocity) as it exits (or enters) an enclosed chamber or pipe.

A nozzle is often a pipe or tube of varying cross sectional area, and it can be used to direct or modify the flow of a fluid (liquid or gas). Nozzles are frequently used to control the rate of flow, speed, direction, mass, shape, and/or the pressure of the stream that emerges from them. In a nozzle, the velocity of fluid increases at the expense of its pressure energy.

== Types ==
=== Jet ===
A gas jet, fluid jet, or hydro jet is a nozzle intended to eject fluid in a coherent stream into a surrounding medium. Gas jets are commonly found in gas stoves, ovens, or barbecues. Gas jets were commonly used for light before the development of electric light. Other types of fluid jets are found in carburetors, where smooth calibrated orifices are used to regulate the flow of fuel into an engine, and in jacuzzis or spas.

Another specialized jet is the laminar jet. This is a water jet that contains devices to smooth out the pressure and flow, and produces laminar flow, as its name suggests. This provides better results for fountains.

The foam jet is another type of jet, which uses foam instead of a gas or fluid.

Nozzles used for feeding hot blast into a blast furnace or forge are called tuyeres.

Jet nozzles are also used in large rooms where the distribution of air via ceiling diffusers is not possible or not practical. Diffusers that uses jet nozzles are called jet diffuser where it will be arranged in the side wall areas in order to distribute air. When the temperature difference between the supply air and the room air changes, the supply air stream is deflected upwards, to supply warm air, or downwards, to supply cold air.

=== High-velocity ===
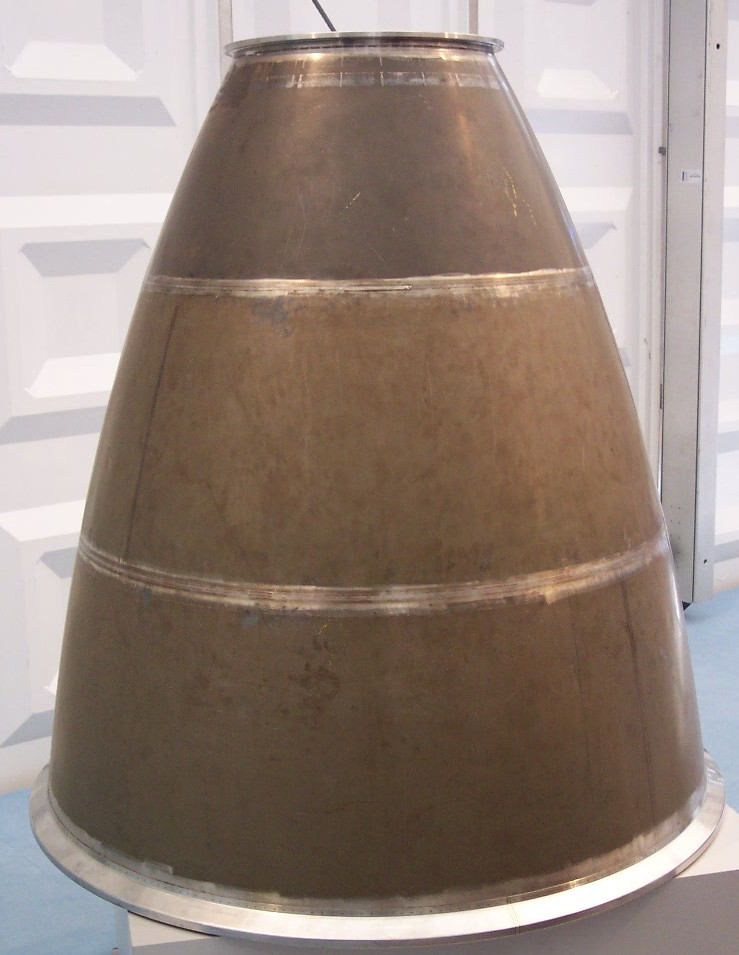
A nozzle from the Ariane 5 rocket

Frequently, the goal of a nozzle is to increase the kinetic energy of the flowing medium at the expense of its pressure and internal energy.

Nozzles can be described as convergent (narrowing down from a wide diameter to a smaller diameter in the direction of the flow) or divergent (expanding from a smaller diameter to a larger one). A de Laval nozzle has a convergent section followed by a divergent section and is often called a convergent–divergent (CD, con–di) nozzle.

Convergent nozzles accelerate subsonic fluids. If the nozzle pressure ratio is high enough, then the flow will reach sonic velocity at the narrowest point (i.e. the nozzle throat). In this situation, the nozzle is said to be choked.

Increasing the nozzle pressure ratio further will not increase the throat Mach number above one. Downstream (i.e. external to the nozzle) the flow is free to expand to supersonic velocities; however, Mach 1 can be a very high speed for a hot gas because the speed of sound varies as the square root of absolute temperature. This fact is used extensively in rocketry, where hypersonic flows are required and where propellant mixtures are deliberately chosen to further increase the sonic speed.

Divergent nozzles slow fluids if the flow is subsonic, but they accelerate sonic or supersonic fluids.

Convergent–divergent nozzles can therefore accelerate fluids that have choked in the convergent section to supersonic speeds. This CD process is more efficient than allowing a convergent nozzle to expand supersonically externally. The shape of the divergent section also ensures that the direction of the escaping gases is directly backwards, as any sideways component would not contribute to thrust.

=== Propelling ===
A jet exhaust produces thrust from the energy obtained from burning fuel. The hot gas is at a higher pressure than the outside air and escapes from the engine through a propelling nozzle, which increases the speed of the gas.

Exhaust speed needs to be faster than the aircraft speed in order to produce thrust but an excessive speed difference wastes fuel (poor propulsive efficiency). Jet engines for subsonic flight use convergent nozzles with a sonic exit velocity. Engines for supersonic flight, such as used for fighters and SST aircraft (e.g. Concorde) achieve the high exhaust speeds necessary for supersonic flight by using a divergent extension to the convergent engine nozzle which accelerates the exhaust to supersonic speeds.

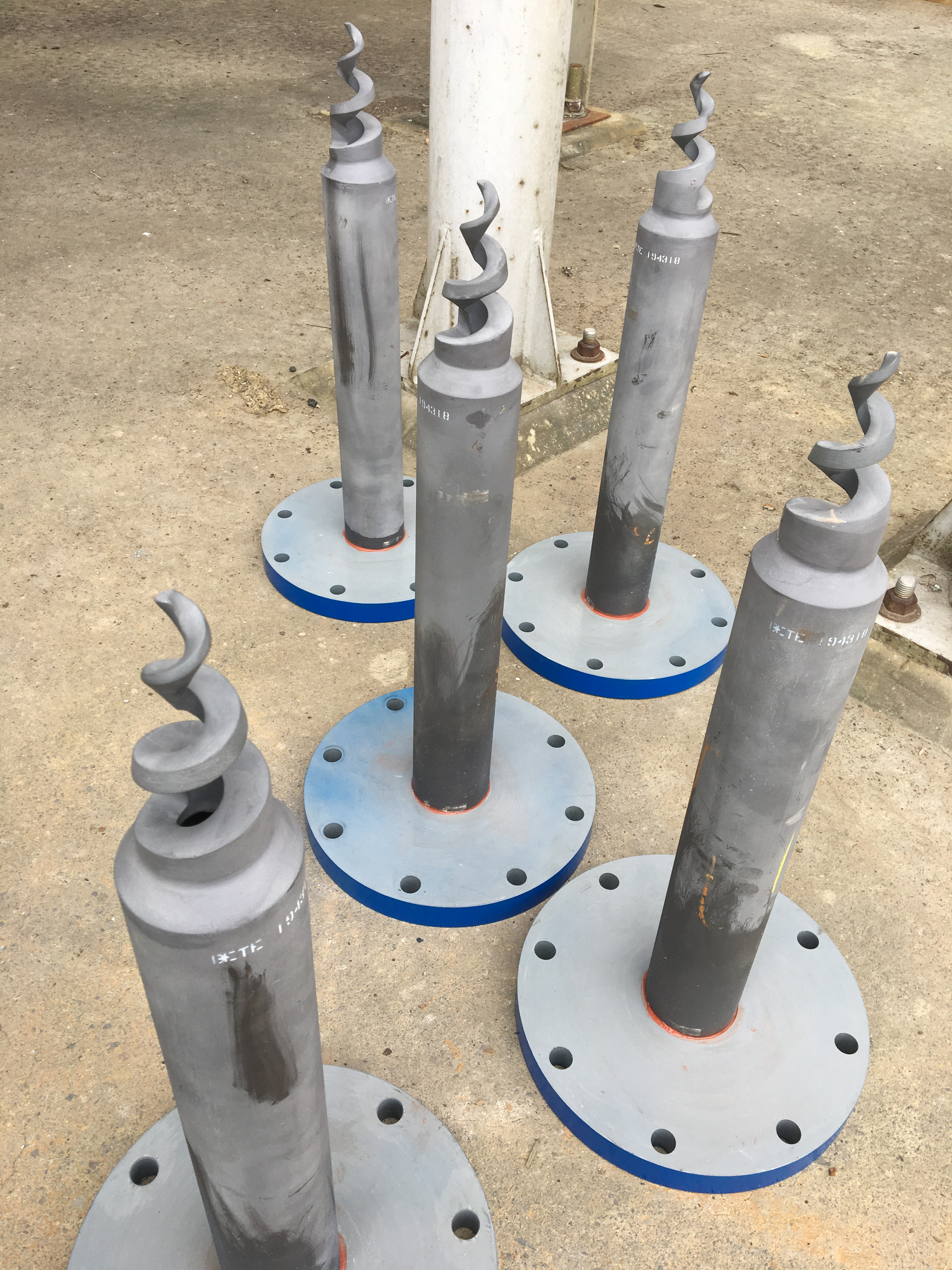
Multiple large spiral nozzles (also known as pigtail nozzles) used in a scrubber application. Spiral nozzles typically have the largest free passage design to help prevent clogging.

Rocket motors maximise thrust and exhaust velocity by using convergent–divergent nozzles with very large area ratios and therefore extremely high pressure ratios. Mass flow is at a premium because all the propulsive mass is carried with the vehicle, and very high exhaust speeds are desirable.

=== Magnetic ===
Magnetic nozzles have also been proposed for some types of propulsion, such as VASIMR, in which the flow of plasma is directed by magnetic fields instead of walls made of solid matter.

=== Spray ===
Many nozzles produce a very fine spray of liquids.

- An atomizer nozzle is used for spray painting, perfumes, carburetors for internal combustion engines, spray-on deodorants and antiperspirants, and many other similar uses.
- An air-aspirating nozzle uses an opening in the cone-shaped nozzle to inject air into a stream of water-based foaming mixture (CAFS/AFFF/FFFP) to make the concentrate "foam up". Most commonly found on foam extinguishers and foam handlines.
- A swirl nozzle injects liquid tangentially, and it spirals into the center and then exits through the central hole. Due to the vortexing this causes the spray to come out in a cone shape.
- A water-spray nozzle is designed to distribute water in a controlled pattern for cooling, dust suppression, fire protection, or industrial applications. It ensures efficient liquid dispersion for various needs.

=== Vacuum ===
Vacuum cleaner nozzles come in several different shapes. Vacuum nozzles are used in vacuum cleaners.

=== Shaping ===
Some nozzles are shaped to produce a stream that is of a particular shape. For example, extrusion molding is a way of producing lengths of metals or plastics or other materials with a particular cross-section. This nozzle is typically referred to as a die.

== See also ==
- Fire hose#Forces on fire hoses and nozzles
- Rocket engine nozzle
- SERN
