= The Battle for Skies =

2000 novel by Maxim Kalashnikov

The battle for skies
- Author: Maxim Kalashnikov
- Original title: Битва за небеса (Bitva za nebesa)
- Cover artist: G. Zhivotov
- Language: Russian
- Genre: Historical/geopolitical novel
- Publisher: The Great Resistance
- Publication date: 2000
- Publication place: Russia
- Pages: 800
- ISBN: 5-89747-003-0
- OCLC: 46323286
- LC Class: UA770 .K2527 2000
- Preceded by: The Broken Sword of the Empire
- Followed by: The Wrath of the Orc

The Battle for Skies (Russian: Битва за небеса) is a novel by Russian author Maxim Kalashnikov, first published in 2000 by the Great Resistance publisher. It is the second part of Kalashnikov's historical, geopolitical and economical series of novels (the sequel to The Broken Sword of the Empire).

The Battle for Skies is essentially the big missing part of The Broken Sword of the Empire—what the author meant to write about the Cold War but didn't include into the first book. A few changes can yet be seen. Kalashnikov was deeply touched by the Yugoslavian crisis (Operation Allied Force) in 1999. As a result, he wrote the introduction of the second book by exposing his thoughts about this war. Notably, the author draw a distinct parallel between the events in Yugoslavia and the state of affairs in Russia. Kalashnikov was convinced that it was only an exercise for the "Westerners" (NATO country-members), and that the same destiny would await Russia in the close future.

== Structure ==
The Battle for Skies is larger than its predecessor. It is divided into four parts :

- "Part I: World War IV-the wolf hour". It is essentially a large introduction, which explains the important points of what the author calls "the Fourth World War" (1999-....), using an argumentation structured as a discussion between Maxim Kalashnikov and the Russian economist Mikhail Delyagin. According to the author, NATO had started World War IV with the Operation Allied Force in Yugoslavia. Like the Cold War, it is based on local conflicts (e.g., Iraq), but it also includes a full scale financial and media global war.
- "Part II: The glory of our fathers". This is a historically accurate description of the Cold War from 1945 (Churchill's Operation Unthinkable) to the détente of the 1970s through a Soviet perspective.
- "Part III: The "Black Bird" hunters". Here the author continues the history of the Cold War. Yet as Kalashnikov approaches to the end, the writings tend to take a rather fantastic perspective. A parallel universe is modeled where the Soviet Union is ruled by a mystical "Commander in chief", which corresponds in every detail to the Joseph Stalin figure.
- "Part IV: the Ubercorporation Empire: Memories of the future". This last part is a description of an utopian Russia which has achieved global control after a victory in the Cold War.
