= All-Russian Public Organization of Veterans of the Russian Armed Forces =

- Общероссийская общественная организация ветеранов Вооруженных Сил Российской Федерации
- Abbreviation: OOOV VS RF (ОООВ ВС РФ)
- Formation: January 26, 2009; 17 years ago
- Type: Nonprofit,
- Registration no.: 1097799001640
- Headquarters: Moscow
- Location: Russia
- Chairman: Viktor Yermakov
- Website: veteranvs.ru

All-Russian Public Organization of Veterans of the Russian Armed Forces (Russian: Общероссийской общественной организации ветеранов Вооруженных Сил Российской Федерации) is an association of army and navy veterans of the Russian Armed Forces. It has an extensive network of regional branches, representing 1.5 million veterans of the Russian Armed Forces. The organization is a member of the All-Russia People's Front.

== History ==
The decision to establish the organization was made at the first organizational conference of the Armed Forces veterans on November 12, 2008. The initiative emerged from the need to bring together numerous existing veterans' associations representing different branches and services of the Russian Armed Forces. The intention was to create a nationwide organization comparable to established veterans' associations within other Russian security and law-enforcement institutions. The constituent conference adopted the organization's charter and established its governing bodies. At that same time, General of the Army Mikhail Moiseyev, former Chief of the General Staff of the Russian Armed Forces, was elected as its chairman. The organization received official registration from the Russian Ministry of Justice on 22 January 2009. Over its four years of existence, the organization has grown into a robust association of like-minded individuals, united in their efforts to foster camaraderie among veterans, promote cooperation, and provide mutual support. A major milestone came on 17 November 2012, when the organization held its Second Reporting and Election Conference. General of the Army Viktor Yermakov was elected chairman of the council, succeeding Moiseyev.

In October 2014, Minister of Defence, Sergei Shoigu, signed Order No. 719, concerning improvements to cooperation with veterans' organizations of the Armed Forces. The measures provided for a more structured system of interaction between the Ministry of Defence and veterans' associations, the appointment of officials responsible for veteran affairs in military districts, branches of the armed forces and military commissariats, greater involvement of veterans in military-patriotic education, better coordination of social and organizational work with former servicemen.

== Activity ==
- Support for Participants in the Special Military Operation: The organization is actively involved in providing humanitarian aid for the special military operation and assisting troops on the front lines.
- Patriotic Education: Engaging with the youth, preserving historical memory, and defending the "historical truth" regarding the Great Patriotic War and other military conflicts.
- Social Protection and Mutual Aid: Assisting veterans, individuals with military service-related disabilities, Ministry of Defence pensioners, and their family members in addressing social, medical, and legal issues.
- Consolidating the Potential of Veterans: Leveraging the experience and expertise of veterans to bolster the standing of the armed forces (army and navy), while maintaining collaboration with regional branches across the country.
- Publishing and Educational Outreach: Officially registered activities include the production of specialized literature, books, and periodicals.
