= Yevgeny Fyodorov (politician) =

Russian politician

- Евгений Фёдоров
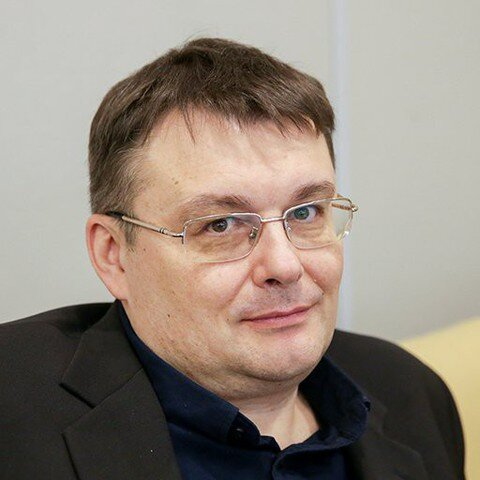
- Fyodorov in 2022

Coordinator of the National Liberation Movement
- Incumbent
- Assumed office 12 November 2012
- Preceded by: Position established

Personal details
- Born: 11 May 1963 (age 63) Leningrad, Russian SFSR, Soviet Union
- Education: Leningrad Higher Military Engineering and Construction College

Military service
- Allegiance: Soviet Union
- Years of service: 1985–1988
- Battles/wars: Soviet–Afghan War

Yevgeny Alexeyevich Fedorov (Fyodorov; Russian: Евгений Алексеевич Фёдоров; born 11 May 1963) is a Russian nationalist politician and deputy of the State Duma of the Federal Assembly of Russia four convocations (1993–1996, 2003), chairman of the Committee on Economic Policy and Entrepreneurship of the State Duma, member of the Central Political Council of United Russia party, PhD. State Councilor of the Russian Federation, coordinator of the organization "National Liberation Movement".

== Early life and education ==
He graduated from the Leningrad Higher Military Engineering and Construction College. Army Gen. AN Kamarouski in Military electrical engineer.

== Career ==
From 1985 to 1988 he served in the Soviet Armed Forces, participating in the Soviet–Afghan War.

Since 1990, Fedorov was elected as a deputy of the Leningrad Oblast Council of People's Deputies (one of Russia's regional parliaments, a member of the small council, deputy of the State Duma of the first convocation and the Chairman of the Subcommittee on Economic Security of the State Duma.

In 1996 he was appointed deputy head of the Insurance Supervision Department of the Ministry of Finance of the Russian Federation in 1997, for the post of Deputy Head of the Security Council of Russia. In the 1990s, he initiated the creation of a number of social movements, including the all-Russian political public movement "in support of the development of nuclear energy, industry and science", Russian public movement of depositors of Sberbank, policyholders Rosgosstrakh and the owners of the securities.

He was a member of the Advisory Council of the President of the Russian Federation, a member of the Board of Trustees of the Association of Child Computer Centres "Compass Center" as well as the chairman of the All-Russian political public movement "in support of independent MPs", in 1999 established the electoral bloc Unity.

Until 2001 he worked as Deputy Minister of the Russian Federation for Atomic Energy (predecessor of Rosatom state corporation).

In December 2003, he was elected to the State Duma from the United Russia party and was elected to become a member of the General Council of United Russia.

In April 2005, he was appointed Deputy Chairman of the State Duma Committee on Budget and Taxation. Was a member of the working (tripartite) group on improving intergovernmental relations in the Russian Federation, a member of the State Duma Commission on the Review of the federal budget allocated to defense and national security of the Russian Federation .

In November 2006, Fyodorov was appointed Chairman of the State Duma Committee on Economic Policy, Entrepreneurship and Tourism, and was also selected as a member of the State Duma Commission on the implementation of the annual addresses of the President to the Parliament.

Member of the Council on Competitiveness and Entrepreneurship under the Government of Russia, a member of the Government Commission on the development of small and medium-sized businesses, a member of the Government Commission to ensure the implementation of measures to prevent the bankruptcy of strategic enterprises and organizations as well as organizations of military–industrial complex, a member of the Government Commission on investment projects of national importance, a member of the supervisory board of Rusnano, chairman of the commission on the EurAsEC customs and border Policy.

In 2011 he was elected to the State Duma of the fifth convocation of the party United Russia and was appointed Chairman of the Committee on Economic Policy and Entrepreneurship. Since 2011, coordinates the activities of the national liberation movement in Russia, and in 2013 was elected as chairman of the factional groups in the State Duma of the Russian Federation "For sovereignty".

On 24 March 2022, the United States Department of the Treasury sanctioned him in response to the Russian invasion of Ukraine and Russo-Ukrainian War.

=== Views ===
According to Fyodorov rock music is "U.S.-instigated sabotage".

In September 2012, he stated that Russia and China were the leading powers in ending an alleged "colonization" of the world by the US, where "everyone still plays by the American rules".

In March 2015, he claimed that the recent assassination of the Russian opposition politician Boris Nemtsov had been organized by the CIA.

In June 2015, he claimed that Russia's acknowledgment of the independence of the Baltic states in 1991 had been illegal, and took initiative to the Russian State Prosecutor's investigations on this subject.

In September 2017, he stated in an interview that the crisis surrounding North Korea's nuclear program was that of a situation with freedom fighters battling against the world hegemony of the US, who however seemed to be acting increasingly cowardly, when facing even small threats.

==== Russo-Ukrainian War ====
After Russian rock musician Andrey Makarevich performed for Ukrainian internally displaced people in the town of Slovyansk during the war in Donbas, in August 2014 Fyodorov vowed to introduce legislation to strip Makarevich of all Russian state honors because his performance in Slovansk was "collaborating with the fascists".

In a long video interview from May 2014, Fyodorov predicted a violent coup d'état in Moscow and Russia within a couple of years, organized by Western countries. He stated it would be a US-European-supported "color revolution" (as those previously taking place in Georgia or Ukraine), with collaboration from a local "5th Column". The aim of such a "revolution" would be the grabbing of Russia's natural resources, after abolishing the state as such, which would lead to a dramatic population reduction, as a result of civil war, children's sterilization, LGBT agenda, famine, etc., "like it happened with the American Indians, also as it happed with the African Americans during age of slavery and segregation". This would take place as a continuation of NATO's policy towards the former Warsaw Pact countries, he stated. However, he stated, newborn "People's Republics" in Donetsk and Lugansk (collectively also known as "Novorossia") were a hindrance to NATO's strategy and an ostensible sign of Ukrainians' popular reaction against US-EU's imperialism, able to encourage other former Soviet citizens in Ukraine to break free from the government in Kyiv, and turn the course of events away from Western world dominance. Fyodorov also said that genocide and terror, sponsored by NATO, were taking place in Ukraine to a much larger extent than generally thought, using foreign mercenaries and Neo-Nazis to terrorize and subdue the local population. Fyodorov said that his mass movement PLM (People's Liberation Movement, in Russian NOD, Национально-освободительное движение, sometimes known also as NLM, National Liberation Movement) had 100,000 members. No such coup ended up occurring.

In January 2022, during the Russian-Ukrainian crisis, he proposed, among other things, to use nuclear weapons against the Nevada Test Site or to bomb US military laboratories as a warning.

In June 2022, during the Russian invasion of Ukraine, Fyodorov called for the independent, free status of Lithuania to be repealed. Lithuania got its independence back in 1991 after it was occupied by the Soviet Union in 1940, but Fyodorov claimed that when Lithuania got its independence back, this was done in an illegal way, because it was Russia, as the successor state of the Soviet Union, which should have been granting Lithuania freedom. His argument about Russia being a successor state was based on an amendment to the Russian constitution in 2020. He also argued that the State Council of the Soviet Union, which granted the independence, was not mentioned in the Constitution of the Soviet Union, and therefore was unconstitutional. Further, Fyodorov claimed that Lithuania is a "disputed entity" and therefore according to article 6 of the North Atlantic Treaty cannot be a member of NATO. A spokesperson for the Lithuanian Foreign Ministry characterized his claims as "absurd". On 14 June, the day of the 1941 deportation by the USSR of tens of thousands of people to Siberia from occupied Estonia, Latvia and Lithuania, he threatened to propose similar laws to the Duma regarding Estonia, Latvia and Ukraine.

In December 2023, Fyodorov called for the return of the Childless tax to boost birthrates.
