= National Liberation Movement (Russia) =

National Liberation Movement Национально-освободительное движение
- Abbreviation: NOD (English); НОД (Russian)
- Leader: Yevgeny Fyodorov
- Founded: 12 November 2012; 13 years ago
- Split from: United Russia
- Headquarters: Moscow, Russia
- Newspaper: National Course: For the sovereignty of Russia!
- Membership (2021): >193,576
- Ideology: Ultranationalism; Okhranitelstvo; Sovereigntism; Statism; Russian nationalism Russian irredentism Anti-Americanism; Anti-globalism; Eurasianism; Reactionism
- Political position: Far-right
- National affiliation: All-Russia People's Front
- Colours: Black; Orange
- Slogan: "Our country — Our rules!" (Russian: "Наша страна — наши правила!")

Party flag
- (See also: Ribbon of Saint George)

Website
- rusnod.ru

The National Liberation Movement (NLM or NOD; Russian: Национально-освободительное движение; НОД; Natsionalno-osvoboditelnoye dvizheniye, NOD) is a Russian far-right political movement. The first mentions of the movement refer to November 2012. It is positioned by its activists as an organization without legal personality.

As its purpose NLM declares the restoration of Russia's sovereignty. The movement stands for the national course and the territorial integrity of the state.

NLM activities expressed in spreading their ideology and changing public awareness through participation in pickets and rallies, distribution of campaign materials, personal work with government officials and others. Also in the movement activities are included the opposition to color interventions (the so-called "outdoor component") and the "intelligence service" against opponents of sovereignty. NLM members have been linked to many of the so-called Zelyonka attacks. In 2016, activists were actively involved in the political life of the country and, in particular, a number of NLM members participated in the elections to the State Duma of the Russian Federation, although none were elected.

== History ==
The first mentions of the movement refer to November 2012. According to the journalist of "Kommersant-Vlast" the movement is founded by Yevgeny Fyodorov in 2012, shortly after the "swamp case".

As the movement NLM is not registered and has no legal relationship with the state. The Movement in 2013 registered the party "National Course", the founder is the assistant of Yevgeny Fyodorov and an activist of the Eurasian Youth Union Andrey Kovalenko. The party is considered by NLM as the infrastructure for the future referendum. On March 12, 2014 there was registered the information and analytical newspaper " NLM: For sovereignty". On March 27 the same year there was registered the newspaper "National Course" (of the same name party). In 2015, NLM joined to the movement "Antimaydan". To that moment, the movement had a regional network throughout Russia, also it had supporters and branches in Belarus, Kazakhstan, Moldova, Ukraine, Azerbaijan, Bulgaria, Canada, Finland, Estonia, the Czech Republic and Germany.

In 2016, members of the movement participated in the elections to the State Duma of the Russian Federation.

In December 2022, NOD member Ravil Garifullin advocated for a nuclear attack on the United States by driving a car dubbed the "Sarmatmobile" with a mock-up of a RS-28 Sarmat ICBM from Kazan to the U.S. Embassy in Moscow. Various Participants of the surrounding demonstrations called for a 'pre-emptive strike on decision-making centers'.

== Ideology ==
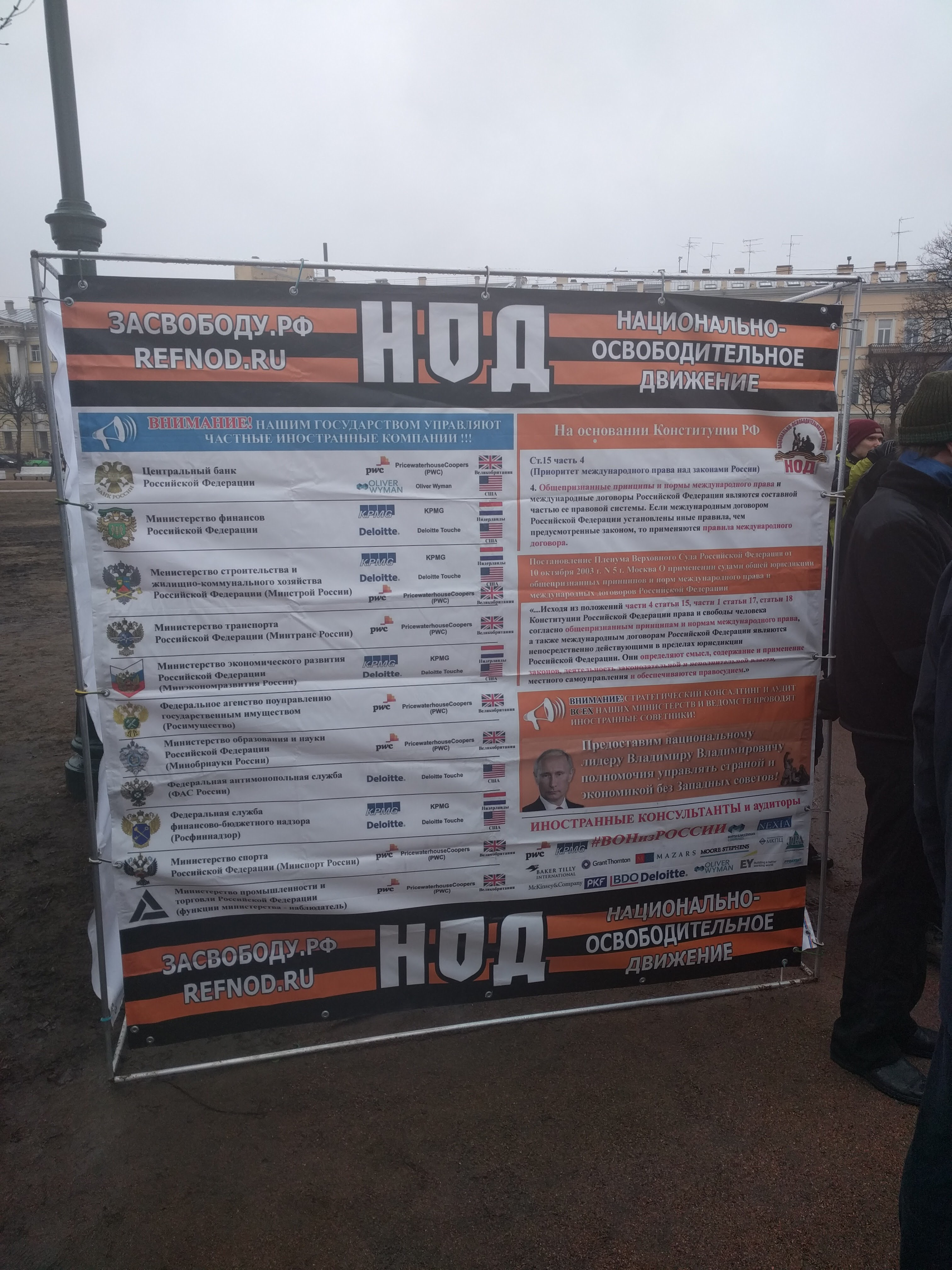
The national liberation movement about what US companies operate the Russian Federation, at an anti-corruption rally on March 26, 2017, Saint Petersburg, Russia.

The ideology of the movement is based on what was stated by Yevgeny Fyodorov since 2011, according to which after the collapse of the USSR in 1991, the real power in the Russian Federation is in the hands of the United States, and this form of government has led the "occupied" country to the "colony" status. Also, according to the ideology, the Russian Federation pays "daily tribute" in the form of ruble emission through the Central Bank, and does not invest in supporting of the national economy and does not create a big business in the domestic jurisdiction. At the same time, the NLM representatives argue that the United States controls federal TV channels, legislative activity and the state apparatus through direct agents (as ministers and officials), as well as through NPOs, that receive foreign grants, and international consulting companies, having access to the documents of key Russian companies.

According to Yevgeny Fyodorov, Russian President Vladimir Putin, being a reformer of the system and the leader of the national liberation movement, began to resist foreign influence (canceling the production sharing agreement, Khasavyurt Accord and prohibiting the adoption of Russian orphans by Americans). Yevgeny Fyodorov believes that the final victory of the president requires popular support and the goal of the opponents of Vladimir Putin from the opposition is to overthrow the President of the Russian Federation to stop his liberation activities, as well as the introduction of direct control of the metropolis.

In support of the President, Yevgeny Fyodorov suggested to amend the Constitution by adding the concept of state ideology and sovereignty. Among the demands were the nationalization of the Central Bank, reducing the refinancing rate to 1 percent and the ban on the purchase of foreign currency by the reserve fund. Like the goal of the movement they proclaimed "the restoration of sovereignty lost in 1991". It has been described as ultra-conservative and far-right.
