= SERN =

Type of physical linear expansion nozzle

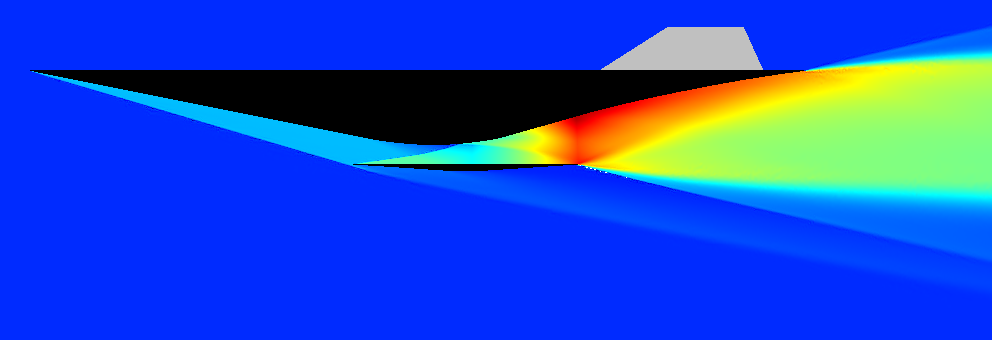
Temperature distribution in and around a Scramjet vehicle with SERN

In rocketry, a SERN, which stands for single expansion ramp nozzle, is a type of physical linear expansion nozzle where the gas pressure transfers work only on one side. Traditional nozzles are axially symmetric, and therefore surround the expanding gas. Linear nozzles are not axially symmetric, but consist of a 2D configuration of two expansion ramps. A SERN could also be seen as a single sided aerospike engine.

Many designs for space planes with scramjet engines make use of SERNs because of the weight reduction at large expansion ratios, or the additional lift at under-expansion. The X-43, a test vehicle in NASA's Hyper-X programme, is a flying example.

One of the practical problems with the use of SERNs is the fact that they produce a pitching moment depending on the throttling of the engine, thereby requiring more control authority of the elevators, more complex control systems, etc.
