= Maxim Kalashnikov =

Russian writer (born 1966)

Vladimir Kucherenko
- Владимир Кучеренко
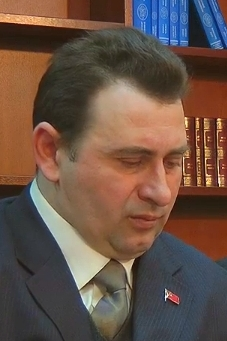
- Kalashnikov live on The National Issue in 2010
- Born: December 21, 1966 (age 59); Ashgabat, Turkmen SSR, USSR
- Education: Moscow State University
- Occupations: Journalist; writer; blogger; political activist
- Writing career
- Pen name: Maxim Kalashnikov
- Genres: History, geopolitics

Vladimir Alexandrovich Kucherenko (Russian: Владимир Александрович Кучеренко; born December 21, 1966), better known by the pen name Maxim Kalashnikov (Максим Калашников), is a Russian writer, publicist, and political activist.

His writings focus on praising the Soviet Union and its political and economic system from a Russian nationalist perspective and criticizing the current Russian government. He also discusses the perceived NATO (particularly American) threat to Russia and the likelihood that this antagonism will result in a nuclear war between Russia and NATO.

In July 2024, he saw it as clear that Russia would not be able to win the war against Ukraine, and complained that Russia had had big losses. He promoted the idea that the war should end with a negotiated peace and that Russia should keep the occupied parts of Ukraine.

== Ideology and criticism ==
Maxim Kalashnikov is a Russian nationalistic agitator. As an expert in Russian history, economics, and military, he criticizes modern Russia and praises the Soviet system, or more precisely what it was under Joseph Stalin and what it could have become without Leonid Brezhnev and Mikhail Gorbachev. He is an advocate of "a federated Russian Empire" consisting of the Russian Federation, Ukraine, parts of Belarus, Moldova's breakaway Transnistria, and Georgia's Abkhazia and South Ossetia. He has described himself as a supporter of "dismemberment" of Georgia and creation of Russian-allied enclaves in its territory.

Kalashnikov has often been criticized for lack of objectivity and abuse of sentimentalism in his writings. His writings primarily target younger generations of Russians. He has also been criticized for making numerous contradictions. For example, in some of his writings, Kalashnikov praises Stalin and the Soviet system, yet in other writings, he espouses sharp anti-communist arguments.

In September 2009 President of Russia Dmitry Medvedev urged the government to study Kalashnikov's ideas for speeding the development of the country’s innovative economy posted at LiveJournal.

== Major works ==
- Московский спрут The Muscovite Octopus (1993)
- Москва — империя тьмы Moscow – the Empire of Darkness (1995)
- Сломанный меч империи The Broken Sword of the Empire (1998/2000/2002)
- Битва за небеса The Battle for Skies (2000/2002)
- Гнев орка The Wrath of the Orc (in collaboration with Yuri Krupnov 2003)
- Оседлай молнию Ride the Lightning (in collaboration with Yuri Krupnov 2003)
- Вперед, в СССР-2 Towards USSR 2.0 (2003)
- Третий проект: книга-расследование в 3 тт. The Third Project: An Investigation Book in 3 Volumes (in collaboration with Sergey Kugushev 2005/2006)
- Код Путина The Putin Code (2005)
- Война с Големом The War Against the Golem (2006)
- Сверхчеловек говорит по-русски The Übermensch Speaks Russian (in collaboration with Rodion Rusov, 2006)
- Крещение огнём The Baptism of Fire (2007)
