= Perovo constituency =

Russian legislative constituency

Perovo single-member constituency
- Constituency of the Russian State Duma

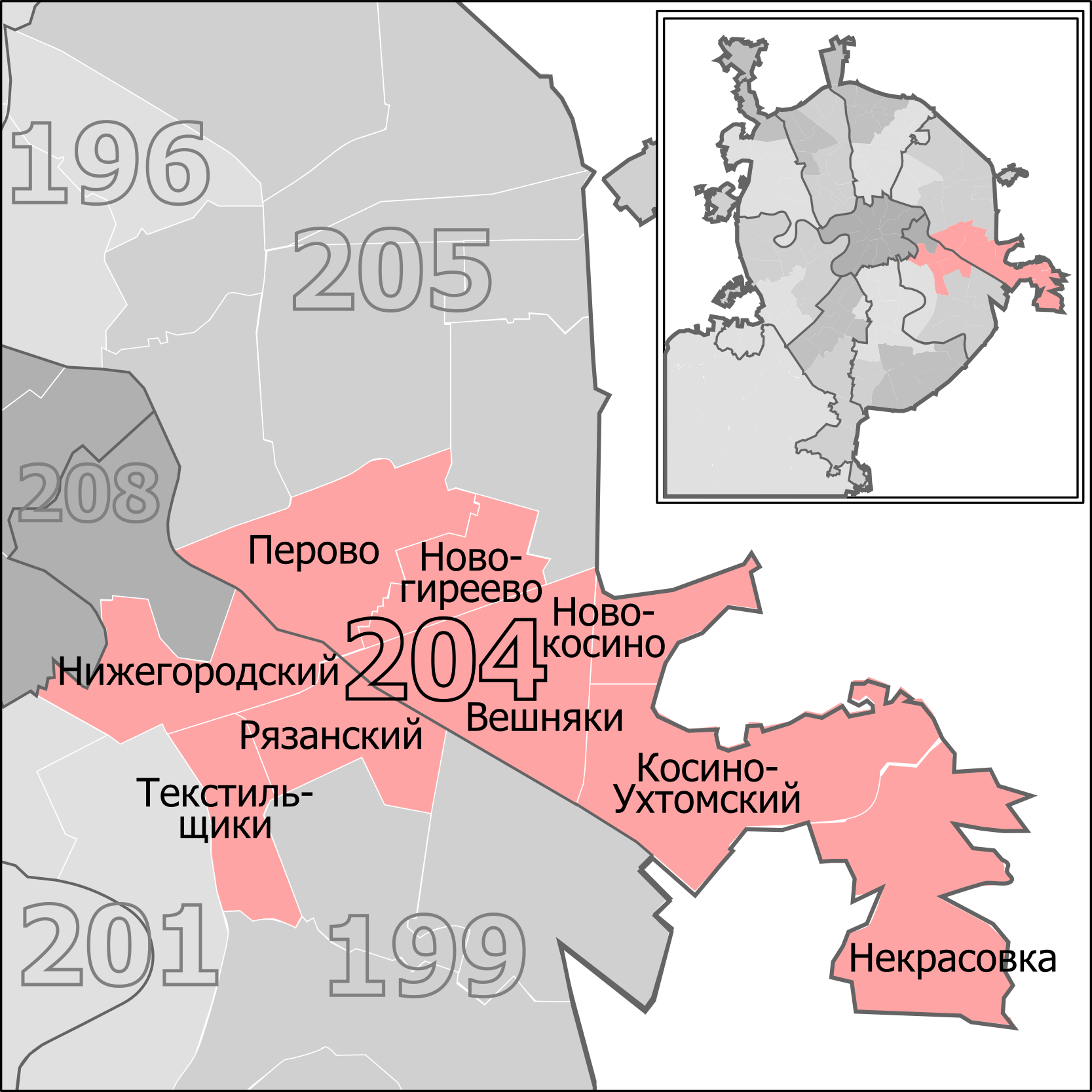
- Constituency boundaries since 2016
- Deputy: Eduard Shonov; United Russia
- Federal subject: Moscow
- Districts: Eastern AO (Kosino-Ukhtomsky, Novogireyevo, Novokosino, Perovo, Veshnyaki), South-Eastern AO (Nekrasovka, Nizhegorodsky, Ryazansky, Tekstilshchiki)
- Voters: 544,907 (2026)

The Perovo сonstituency (No.203 (Note: No.197 in 1993-1995, No.198 in 1995-2007, No.204 in 2016–2026)) is a Russian legislative constituency in Moscow. The constituency stretches from inner South-Eastern Moscow to outer Eastern Moscow, as well as former exclave of Nekrasovka.

The constituency has been represented since 2026 by United Russia deputy Eduard Shonov, UAV centre executive and retired Russian Army guards major, who won the open seat, succeeding one-term United Russia incumbent Tatyana Butskaya.

== Boundaries ==
1993–1995: Eastern Administrative Okrug (Ivanovskoye District, Kosino-Ukhtomsky District, Novogireyevo District, Novokosino District, Perovo District, Sokolinaya Gora District, Veshnyaki District, Vostochnoye Izmaylovo District)
The constituency covered southern half of Eastern Moscow.

1995–2007: Eastern Administrative Okrug (Ivanovskoye District, Kosino-Ukhtomsky District, Novogireyevo District, Novokosino District, Perovo District, Sokolinaya Gora District, Veshnyaki District)
After the 1995 redistricting the constituency was slightly altered, losing Vostochnoye Izmaylovo to Preobrazhensky constituency.

2016–present: Eastern Administrative Okrug (Kosino-Ukhtomsky District, Novogireyevo District, Novokosino District, Perovo District, Veshnyaki District), South-Eastern Administrative Okrug (Nekrasovka District, Nizhegorodsky District, Ryazansky District, Tekstilshchiki District)
The constituency was re-created for the 2016 election and retained most of its former territory, losing Ivanovskoye and Sokolinaya Gora to Preobrazhensky constituency. This seat instead was pushed to South-Eastern Moscow, gaining Nizhegorodsky District, Ryazansky District and Tekstilshchiki from the former Avtozavodsky constituency as well as Nekrasovka from Lyublino constituency (Nekrasovka also gained Lyuberetskiye Polya residential area in 2011, formerly part of Lyuberetsky District in Lyubertsy constituency).

== Members elected ==
Election	Member	Party
1993	Aleksandr Osovtsov	Independent
1995	Valery Borshchyov	Yabloko
1999	Valery Ryazansky	Fatherland – All Russia
2003	Valery Ryazansky	United Russia
2007	Proportional representation - no election by constituency	
2011	Proportional representation - no election by constituency	
2016	Sergey Zheleznyak	United Russia
2021	Tatyana Butskaya	United Russia
2026	Eduard Shonov	United Russia

== Election results ==
=== 1993 ===
Summary of the 12 December 1993 Russian legislative election in the Perovo constituency
Candidate	Party	Votes	%
Aleksandr Osovtsov	Independent	38,742	15.71%
Igor Zaslavsky	Independent	–	11.08%
Valery Borshchyov	Yavlinky–Boldyrev–Lukin	–	–
Aleksandr Bulgakov	Independent	–	–
Aleksandr Dubrovin	Independent	–	–
Luiza Gagut	Liberal Democratic Party	–	–
Viktor Karpukhin	Independent	–	–
Oleg Kolbasov	Kedr	–	–
Andrey Lebedev	Independent	–	–
Georgy Lokhov	Russian Democratic Reform Movement	–	–
Andrey Sebentsov	Party of Russian Unity and Accord	–	–
Vladimir Semago	Communist Party	–	–
Ivan Shevchenko	Independent	–	–
Total		246,540	100%

=== 1995 ===
Summary of the 17 December 1995 Russian legislative election in the Perovo constituency
Candidate	Party	Votes	%
Valery Borshchyov	Yabloko	80,533	28.04%
Konstantin Zhukov	Communist Party	34,873	12.14%
Galina Andreyeva	Block of Djuna	19,336	6.73%
Igor Ilyinsky	Ivan Rybkin Bloc	14,065	4.90%
Elmira Abdurakhmanova	Women of Russia	11,433	3.98%
Andrey Lebedev	Trade Unions and Industrialists – Union of Labour	10,293	3.58%
Vladimir Chernov	Party of Russian Unity and Accord	10,122	3.52%
Viktor Kruglyakov	Independent	9,756	3.40%
Sergey Mavrodi	Independent	8,648	3.01%
Aleksandr Makarov	Independent	8,153	2.84%
Yury Khudyakov	Communists and Working Russia - for the Soviet Union	7,879	2.74%
Ivan Shevchenko	Independent	4,749	1.65%
Vladimir Shanygin	Derzhava	4,610	1.61%
Viktor Lyubin	Power to the People!	4,395	1.53%
Vasily Simchera	Liberal Democratic Party	4,234	1.47%
Tatyana Ivanova	Agrarian Party	3,844	1.34%
Yevgeny Yagupets	Bloc of Independents	1,182	0.41%
against all		43,569	15.17%
Total		287,191	100%

=== 1999 ===
Summary of the 19 December 1999 Russian legislative election in the Perovo constituency
Candidate	Party	Votes	%
Valery Ryazansky	Fatherland – All Russia	88,161	29.46%
Valery Borshchyov (incumbent)	Yabloko	66,633	22.27%
Natalia Barmina-Sidorova	Andrey Nikolayev and Svyatoslav Fyodorov Bloc	23,075	7.71%
Vyacheslav Gerasimov	Spiritual Heritage	15,251	5.10%
Ivan Kuzmin	Independent	12,834	4.29%
Igor Voskresensky	Russian Socialist Party	10,772	3.60%
against all		72,714	24.30%
Total		299,245	100%

=== 2003 ===
Summary of the 7 December 2003 Russian legislative election in the Perovo constituency
Candidate	Party	Votes	%
Valery Ryazansky (incumbent)	United Russia	101,082	40.58%
Valery Borshchyov	Yabloko	48,552	19.49%
Yaroslav Sidorov	Communist Party	20,080	8.06%
Vagiz Khidiyatullin	United Russian Party Rus'	9,163	3.68%
Oleg Bolgov	Liberal Democratic Party	8,725	3.50%
Viktor Malinin	Party of Russia's Rebirth-Russian Party of Life	7,618	3.06%
against all		48,471	19.46%
Total		250,609	100%

=== 2016 ===
Summary of the 18 September 2016 Russian legislative election in the Perovo constituency
Candidate	Party	Votes	%
Sergey Zheleznyak	United Russia	74,854	44.35%
Aleksandr Timchenko	Communist Party	19,225	11.39%
Igor Bayko	Liberal Democratic Party	15,224	9.02%
Maksim Kruglov	Yabloko	12,463	7.38%
Aleksandr Korsunov	A Just Russia	8,252	4.89%
Olga Lukhtan	The Greens	7,995	4.74%
Aleksey Balabutkin	Communists of Russia	5,866	3.48%
Yelena Badak	Party of Growth	5,122	3.03%
Vladimir Zalishchak	People's Freedom Party	4,740	2.81%
Igor Yerin	Patriots of Russia	4,059	2.40%
Dmitry Kasmin	Rodina	3,695	2.19%
Maksim Shemyakin	Civilian Power	2,213	1.31%
Total		168,793	100%

=== 2021 ===
Summary of the 17-19 September 2021 Russian legislative election in the Perovo constituency
Candidate	Party	Votes	%
Tatyana Butskaya	United Russia	101,785	39.35%
Sergey Kurgansky	Communist Party	53,315	20.61%
Ksenia Domozhirova	A Just Russia — For Truth	15,951	6.17%
Nikolay Dvorak	Party of Pensioners	12,667	4.90%
Valentin Ignatyev	New People	11,970	4.63%
Yury Kurganov	Communists of Russia	11,775	4.55%
Mikhail Monakhov	Liberal Democratic Party	10,292	3.98%
Vasily Prokhanov	Rodina	8,659	3.35%
Nikolay Kavkazsky	Yabloko	7,248	2.80%
Mikhail Gromyko	Russian Party of Freedom and Justice	5,529	2.14%
Konstantin Presnyakov	The Greens	5,331	2.06%
Anton Shuvalov	Green Alternative	3,418	1.32%
Aleksey Yashin	Party of Growth	2,860	1.11%
Sergey Izmaylov	Civic Platform	2,542	0.98%
Total		258,665	100%

=== 2026 ===
Summary of the 18-20 September 2026 Russian legislative election in the Perovo constituency
Candidate	Party	Votes	%
Eduard Shonov	United Russia	129,649	43.75%
Anton Malyshev	New People	35,773	12.07%
Vera Mysina	Communist Party	35,500	11.98%
Maksim Makarov	Yabloko	33,949	11.46%
Ivan Kurbakov	Liberal Democratic Party	27,878	9.41%
Ksenia Domozhirova	A Just Russia	23,689	7.99%
Olesya Mysiv	Communists of Russia	9,041	3.05%
Total		296,313	100%
