= Moscow City Duma District 16 =

Moscow City Duma electoral constituency

- Moscow City Duma constituency
- Deputy: Yelena Yamshchikova; A Just Russia
- Administrative Okrug: Eastern
- Districts: part of Novogireyevo, Perovo, Sokolinaya Gora
- Voters: 158,614 (2024)

Moscow City Duma District 16 is one of 45 constituencies in Moscow City Duma. Currently the district covers parts of Eastern Moscow.

The district has been represented since 2024 by A Just Russia deputy Yelena Yamshchikova, a former Legislative Assembly of Kemerovo Oblast member, who defeated one-term Independent incumbent Viktor Maksimov (Note: Maksimov was member of the Communist Party of the Russian Federation faction in 2019–2024 but was deselected at the party convention) from District 17.

== Boundaries ==
District boundaries from 2014 to 2024

1993–2001: Kosino-Ukhtomsky, Novogireyevo, Novokosino, Veshnyaki
The district covered outer parts of Eastern Moscow.

2001–2005: Kosino-Ukhtomsky, part of Novogireyevo, Novokosino, Veshnyaki
The district continued to cover outer parts of Eastern Moscow but lost part of Novogireyevo to District 15.

2005–2009: constituency abolished
Prior to the 2005 election the number of constituencies was reduced to 15, so the district was eliminated.

2009–2014: Filyovsky Park, Khoroshyovo-Mnyovniki, Krylatskoye, Kuntsevo, Strogino
The district was created prior to the 2009 election, after the number of constituencies was increased from 15 to 17. The district was based in North-Western and Western Moscow, which were previously divided between districts 3 and 14

2014–2024: Bogorodskoye, Preobrazhenskoye, part of Sokolinaya Gora
The district was completely rearranged in the 2014 redistricting as it was moved to cover inner parts of Eastern Moscow.

2024–present: part of Novogireyevo, Perovo, Sokolinaya Gora
During the 2023–24 Moscow redistricting most of the district was functionally eliminated as most of its territory was divided between 14 (Bogorodskoye) and 15 (Preobrazhenskoye). In its new configuration the district retained only part of Sokolinaya Gora, uniting it with the rest of the raion from former District 17, while most of the current district came from districts 17 (Perovo) and 19 (Novogireyevo).

== Members elected ==
Election	Member	Party
1993	Viktor Kruglyakov (Note: appointed Head of Eastern Division of Moscow Department of Education in January 1997)	Choice of Russia
1997	Sergey Loktionov	Independent
2001	Sergey Loktionov	Independent
2005	Constituency eliminated	
2009	Yevgeny Gerasimov	United Russia
2014	Anton Molev	Independent
2019	Mikhail Timonov	A Just Russia
2024	Yelena Yamshchikova	A Just Russia – For Truth

== Election results ==
=== 2001 ===
Summary of the 16 December 2001 Moscow City Duma election in District 16
Candidate	Party	Votes	%
Sergey Loktionov (incumbent)	Independent	25,570	49.22%
Yury Nazarov	Communist Party	9,569	18.42%
Aleksandr Molokhov	Independent	8,918	17.17%
against all		5,636	10.85%
Total		52,331	100%

=== 2009 ===
Summary of the 11 October 2009 Moscow City Duma election in District 16
Candidate	Party	Votes	%
Yevgeny Gerasimov (incumbent) (Note: redistricted from District 14)	United Russia	82,507	67.01%
Andrey Chupanov	Communist Party	18,210	14.79%
Aleksandr Basmanov	A Just Russia	9,537	7.75%
Maksim Gromov	Liberal Democratic Party	8,368	6.80%
Total		123,128	100%

=== 2014 ===
Summary of the 14 September 2014 Moscow City Duma election in District 16
Candidate	Party	Votes	%
Anton Molev	Independent	14,476	45.85%
Denis Parfenov	Communist Party	6,098	19.32%
Mikhail Timonov	A Just Russia	4,431	14.04%
Yelena Grishchenko	Yabloko	3,324	10.53%
Nikolay Lazarev	Liberal Democratic Party	1,422	4.50%
Marat Mustafin	Independent	729	2.31%
Total		31,570	100%

=== 2019 ===
Summary of the 8 September 2019 Moscow City Duma election in District 16
Candidate	Party	Votes	%
Mikhail Timonov	A Just Russia	12,293	36.40%
Anton Molev (incumbent)	Independent	10,419	30.85%
Aleksandra Andreyeva	Communist Party	5,855	17.34%
Tatyana Gordiyenko	Communists of Russia	1,466	4.34%
Vera Kosova	Liberal Democratic Party	1,395	4.13%
Aleksandra Andreyeva	Independent	1,290	3.82%
Total		33,770	100%

=== 2024 ===
Summary of the 6–8 September 2024 Moscow City Duma election in District 16
Candidate	Party	Votes	%
Yelena Yamshchikova	A Just Russia – For Truth	22,027	34.29%
Viktor Maksimov (incumbent) (Note: redistricted from District 17)	Independent	14,694	22.87%
Mikhail Petrov	Communist Party	11,597	18.05%
Ilya Khovanets	Liberal Democratic Party	10,364	16.13%
Vladimir Davydov	The Greens	5,520	8.59%
Total		64,242	100%
