= Denis Aksenov =

Russian politician

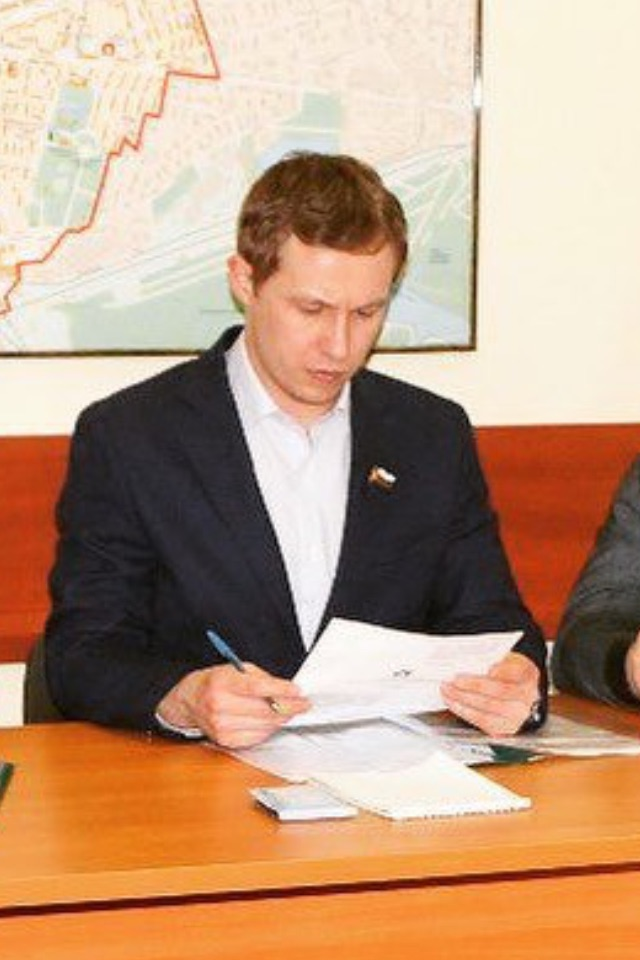

Municipal Deputy The Moscow district Perovo
- Incumbent
- Assumed office 11 September 2017
- President: Vladimir Putin
- Constituency: Moscow

Personal details
- Born: Denis Sergeevich Aksenov; 23 December 1986 (age 39) Moscow, Russia
- Citizenship: Russian Federation
- Party: United Russia
- Education: Moscow Polytechnic University
- Occupation: Politician

Denis Sergeevich Aksenov (Russian: Денис Сергеевич Аксёнов; born 23 December 1986, in Moscow) is a Russian political and public figure. Since 11 September 2017, Aksenov has served as the municipal Deputy of the Moscow district Perovo and is former chairman of the youth chamber at the Moscow City Duma.

== Biography ==
Denis Aksenov was born on 23 December 1986 in Moscow. He graduated from Moscow Polytechnic University, specializing as an engineer-technologist. From April 2011 to December 2015, Aksenov worked in Khrunichev State Research and Production Space Center.

Since 2015, Denis Aksenov has served as a public adviser to the head of the district Council Perovo Alexander Dovgopol, and was also appointed to the position of chairman of the youth chamber of Perovo. In the summer of 2016, he participated in Environment Day celebrations. On 24 January 2017, he took part in an ecology exhibition at the Moscow City Duma. In September 2017, Aksenov was elected Deputy of the Moscow district of Perovo for a term of 5 years as a member of the United Russia party. On 21 December 2017, together with the Deputy of the Moscow city, Duma Zoya Zotova, raided on Christmas bazaars.
