= Novokosino =

Novokosino may refer to:

- Novokosino District
- Novokosino (Moscow Metro)
