= Reutov =

Town in Moscow Oblast, Russia

Reutov Реутов
- Town
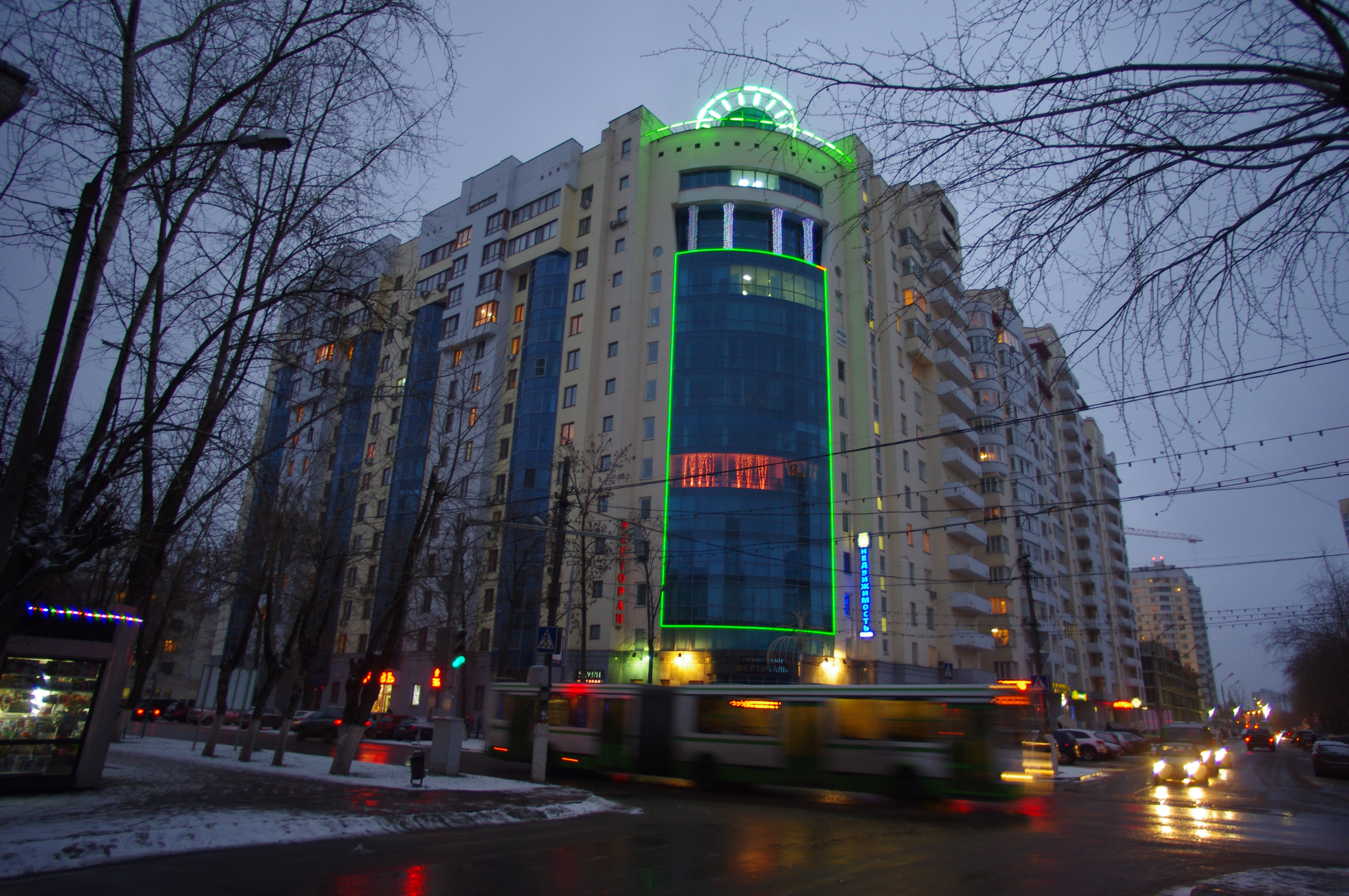
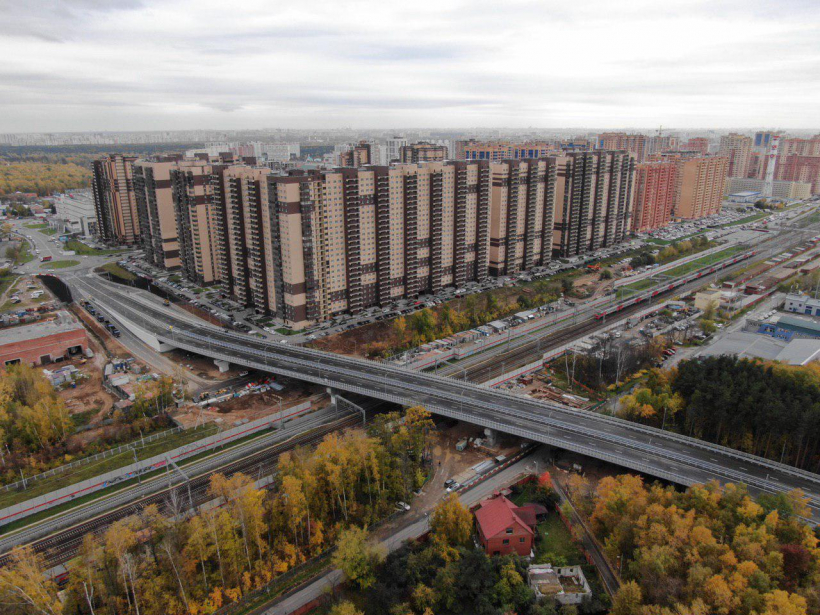
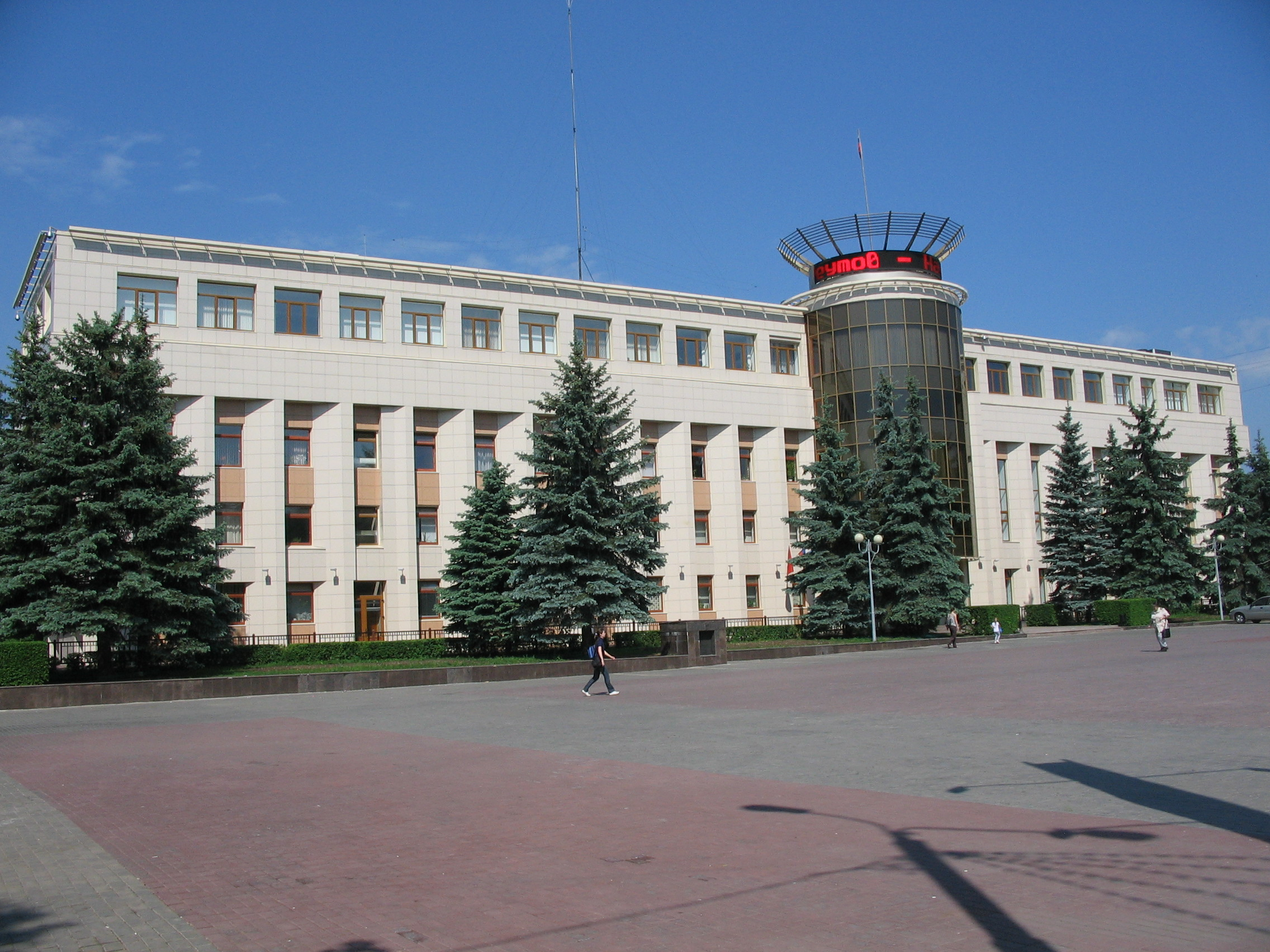
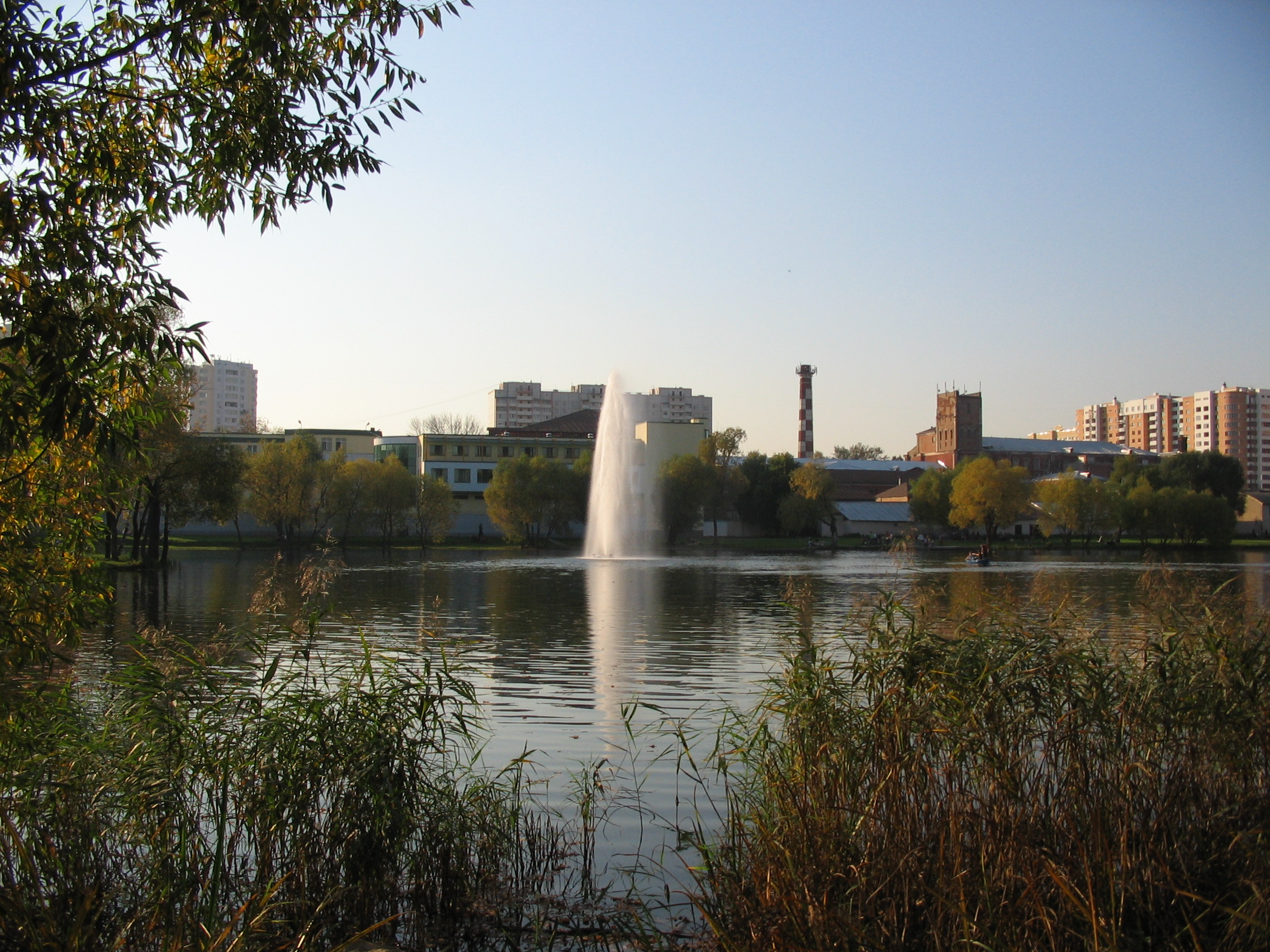
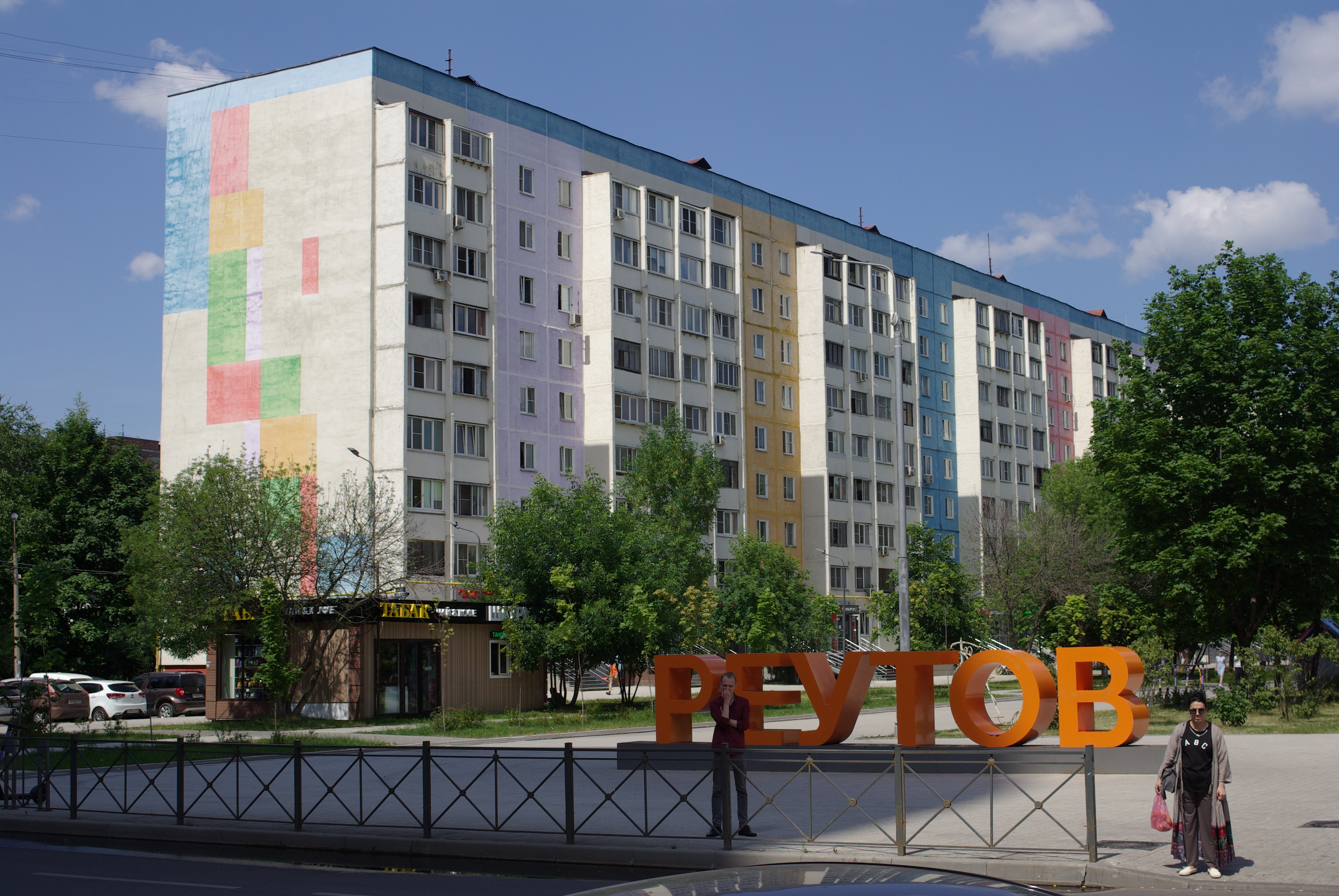
- From left to right, top to bottom: building in the center, Transportnaya Street overpass, city administration building, Factory Pond, house near Alexander Square

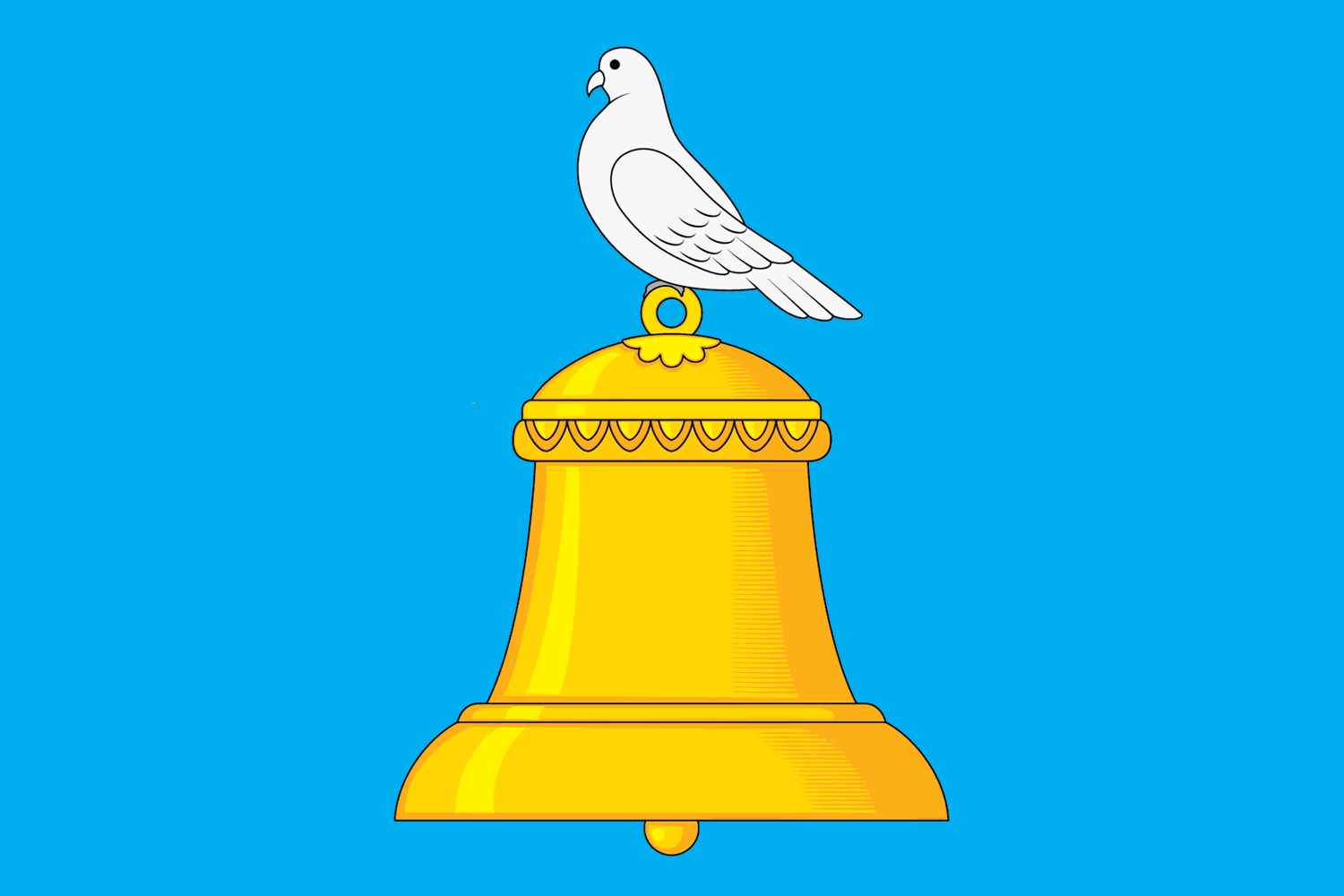
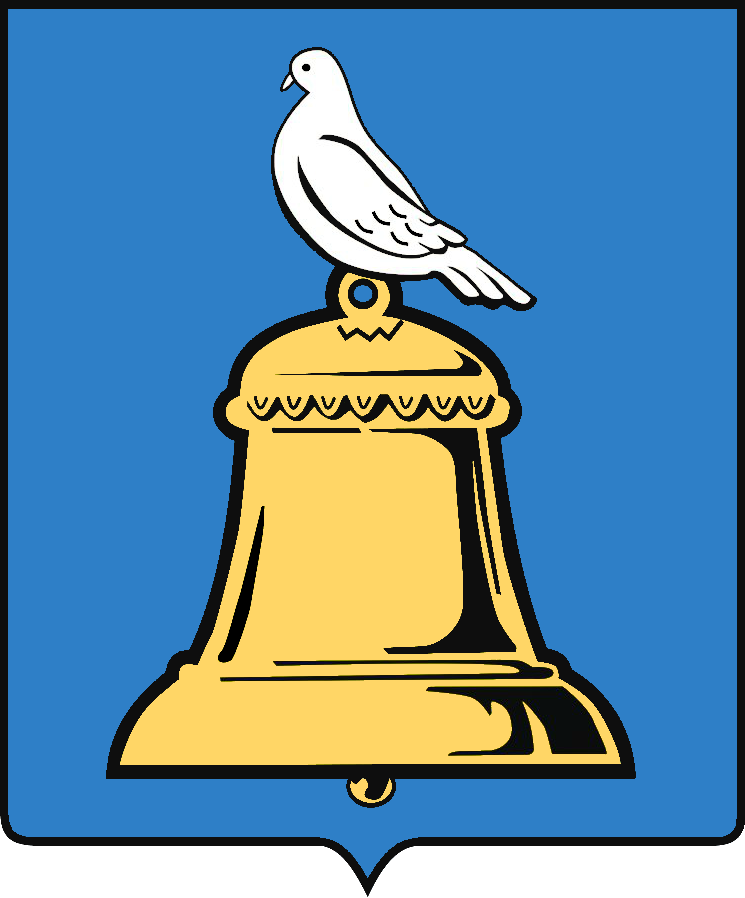
- Flag Coat of arms
- Interactive map of Reutov
- Location of Reutov Reutov (European Russia) Reutov (Europe)
- Coordinates: 55°45′44″N 37°51′24″E
- Country: Russia
- Federal subject: Moscow Oblast
- Founded: between 1492 and 1495

Government
  - Body: Council of Deputies
  - Head: Stanislav Katorov
- Elevation: 166 m (545 ft)

Population (2010 Census)
  - Total: 87,314
  - Estimate (2019): 106,962 (+22.5%)
  - Rank: 193rd in 2010

Administrative status
  - Subordinated to: Reutov Town Under Oblast Jurisdiction
  - Capital of: Reutov Town Under Oblast Jurisdiction

Municipal status
  - Urban okrug: Reutov Urban Okrug
  - Capital of: Reutov Urban Okrug
- Time zone: UTC+3 (MSK)
- Postal codes: 143960, 143964–143966, 143968, 143969
- OKTMO ID: 46764000001
- Town Day: last Saturday in September
- Website: www.reutov.net

Reutov (Russian: Ре́утов ru) is a town in Moscow Oblast, Russia, located east of Moscow. Population: 113,871 (2021 census); 87,314 (2010 census); 76,805 (2002 census); 68,326 (1989 Soviet census).

== History ==
The exact date of Reutov's foundation is unknown; however, most historians believe that it was founded between 1492 and 1495. In the 17th-18th centuries, the village of Reutovo belonged to the dynasties of Prince Turenin and Prince Vasily Dolgorukov. At the beginning of the 18th century, Reutovo became a village. Census Book of 1709 has a record of the village of Reutovo, owned by the Prince Vasily Dolgorukov.

In 1787, the village was acquired by Prince N. I. Maslov. Under his rule Reutovo became a luxurious country estate. At the beginning of the 19th century, Prince Maslov went bankrupt and the village became a property of Lt. Col. A. M. Pokhvistnev who in 1824 built a cotton mill. Yarn from the factory was among the best in Russia and won a gold medal at the All-Russian National Show in 1831. Shortly after that Pokhvistnev sold the land and the mill.

In 1843, the land and the cotton mill was purchased by S. A. Mazurin, a Moscow merchant. He built a brick factory, dormitories, and restructured the cotton mill gradually forming a factory town of Reutovo.

Since 1955, Reutov is the host for NPO Mashinostroyeniya, formerly known as USSR Experimental Design Bureau #52, where development of various robotic and crewed space satellites, ICBMs, cruise missiles takes place; the longtime director was Vladimir Chelomey.

The town is separated from Moscow by the Moscow Ring Road and Nosovikhinskoye Highway. Reutov has the status of a science-town (naukograd) and celebrates its anniversary on the last Saturday of September.

== Local government ==
=== Council of Deputies ===
The Council of Deputies is a representative body of local government of the Reutov urban district. From 1990 to 1993, the post of chairman of the city Council of People's Deputies was held by Nikolai Nikolayevich Kovalev. Since 4 November 1993, he has held the position of first deputy head of the city administration. In 2005, instead of the previous 11 deputies, there were 20.

19 out of 25 deputies (76%) of the current (since 2019) composition of the council are members of the United Russia faction. The Chairman of the Council of Deputies since 2014 is Sergei Mansurovich Yepifanov.

== Administrative and municipal status ==
Within the framework of administrative divisions, it is incorporated as Reutov Town Under Oblast Jurisdiction—an administrative unit with the status equal to that of the districts. As a municipal division, Reutov Town Under Oblast Jurisdiction is incorporated as Reutov Urban Okrug.

== Transportation ==
=== Buses and route taxis ===
Unlike in other cities and towns of Moscow Oblast, public transport is fully serviced by Mosgortrans (State unitary company "Moscow city transport") but always without suburban fare. The only 28 bus is serviced by Balashikha. The transports connect

- From the west: to metro Novogireyevo
- From the south: with districts Novokosino, Kosino, Lubertsy and Kazansky railway.
- From the north: to metro Pervomayskaya

=== Railway and metro ===
Railway station Reutovo is 5 stops (approx 20 mins) by commuter train (elektrichka) from Moscow Kursky Rail Terminal.

Metro station of Novokosino is 7 stations from the centre of Moscow city.

== Twin towns and sister cities ==
Reutov is twinned with:

- Mansfield, United Kingdom
- Nesvizh, Belarus

== Sources ==
- Московская областная Дума. Закон №11/2013-ОЗ от 31 января 2013 г. «Об административно-территориальном устройстве Московской области», в ред. Закона №249/2019-ОЗ от 29 ноября 2019 г. «О внесении изменений в Закон Московской области "Об административно-территориальном устройстве Московской области"». Вступил в силу на следующий день после официального опубликования (13 января 2013 г.). Опубликован: "Ежедневные Новости. Подмосковье", №24, 12 февраля 2013 г. (Moscow Oblast Duma. Law #11/2013-OZ of January 31, 2013 On the Administrative-Territorial Structure of Moscow Oblast, as amended by the Law #249/2019-OZ of November 29, 2019 On amending the Law of Moscow Oblast "On the Administrative-Territorial Structure of Moscow Oblast". Effective as of the day following the day of the official publication (January 13, 2013).).
- Московская областная Дума. Закон №134/2004-ОЗ от 29 октября 2004 г. «О статусе и границе городского округа Реутов», в ред. Закона №63/2012-ОЗ от 30 мая 2012 г. «О внесении изменений в Закон Московской области "О статусе и границе городского округа Реутов"». Вступил в силу со дня официального опубликования. Опубликован: "Ежедневные Новости. Подмосковье", №216, 13 ноября 2004 г. (Moscow Oblast Duma. Law #134/2004-OZ of October 29, 2004 On the Status and the Border of Reutov Urban Okrug, as amended by the Law #63/2012-OZ of May 30, 2012 On Amending the Law of Moscow Oblast "On the Status and the Border of Reutov Urban Okrug". Effective as of the day of the official publication.).
