= Timonov =

Timonov (Russian: Тимонов) is a Russian masculine surname originating from the name Timofey, its feminine counterpart is Timonova. It may refer to the following notable people:

- Mikhail Timonov (born 1965), Russian politician
- Todor Timonov (born 1986), Bulgarian football midfielder
- Yuliya Timonova (born 1973), Russian volleyball player
