= Tatiana Butskaya =

Russian politician (born 1970)

Tatiana Butskaya MP
- Татьяна Буцкая
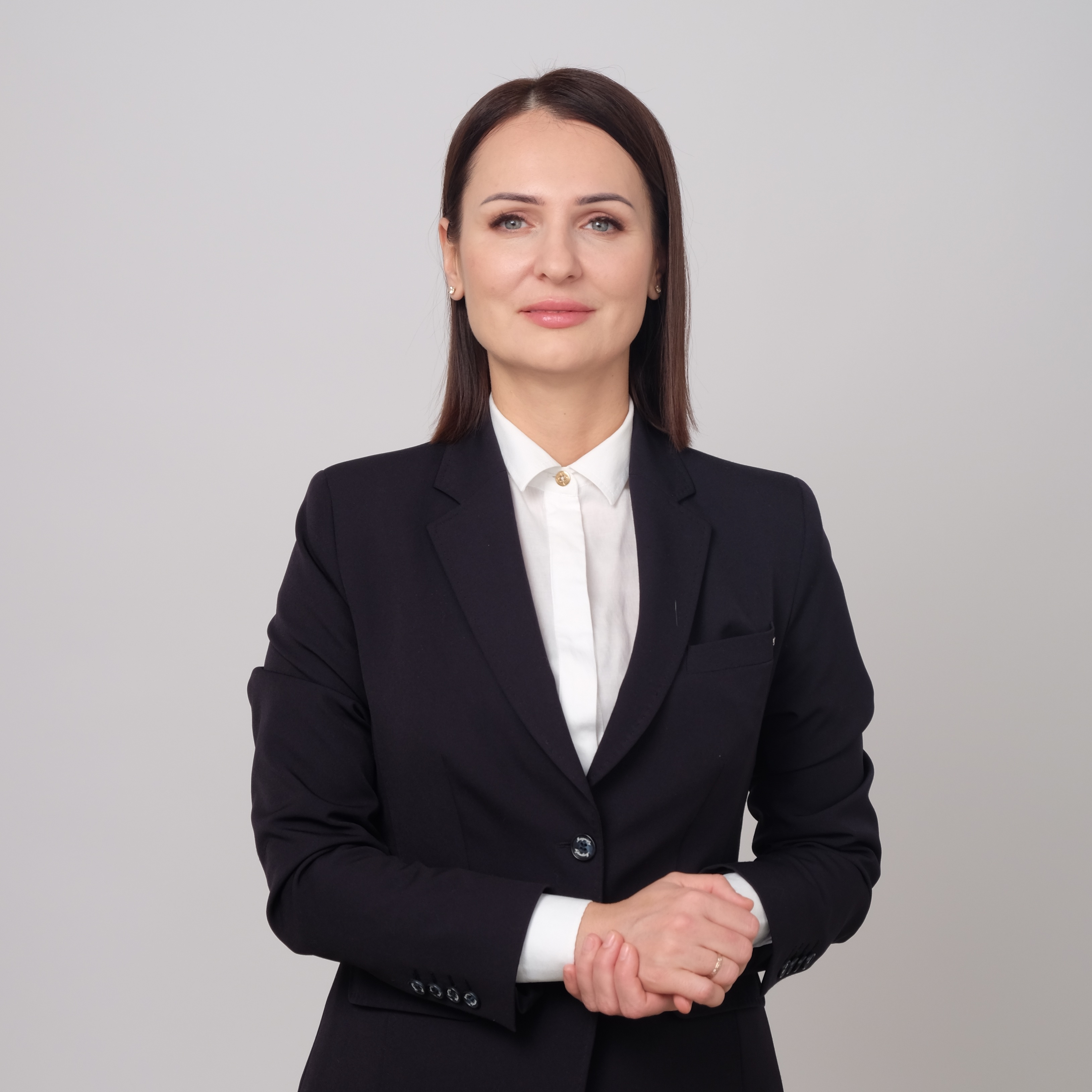

Member of the State Duma for Moscow
- Incumbent
- Assumed office 12 October 2021
- Preceded by: Sergei Zheleznyak
- Constituency: Perovo (No. 204)

Personal details
- Born: 8 May 1975 (age 51) Moscow, RSFSR, USSR
- Party: United Russia
- Education: Russian National Research Medical University

Tatiana Viktorovna Butskaya (Russian: Татьяна Викторовна Буцкая; born May 8, 1975, Moscow) is a Russian political figure and a deputy of the 8th State Duma. In 1999, she graduated from the Russian National Research Medical University. In 2004, she was awarded a Candidate of Sciences degree in medicine. In 2018, Butskaya co-founded the Council of Mothers Russian Public Organisation. She is also a member of the All-Russia People's Front.

Since 2021, she has served as a deputy of the 8th State Duma from the Perovo constituency.

== Initiatives ==
In 2020, while serving as head of the Council of Mothers, Butskaya proposed introducing a childlessness tax for both men and women. "We are talking about those who consciously refuse to decide to have a child. Either you love children and have them, or you don't love them and pay for not loving them," she stated.

In 2023, Butskaya suggested monitoring children's gender preferences starting from kindergarten: in her view, girls should play "mothers and daughters", while boys should play "with cars and toy hammers."

That same year, she proposed a legislative ban on giving male names to girls and female names to boys. The explanatory note clarified that the initiative was prompted by an increase in cases of assigning names that do not correspond to the child's sex. Butskaya mentioned that "a girl was given the name Mikhail at birth by her parents", but did not provide statistics to support her claims. She did not propose banning unisex names.

In 2024, Butskaya proposed requiring employers to monitor birth rates among their employees. "Each employer in their workplace should look: what is your birth rate? In your team? Do you have one more child this year from each person who can have a child, or not? This is exactly how we should pose the question," she said. That same year, Butskaya announced that in 2025, with her participation, a state standard for gifts for newborns would be developed. She prepared a price list of Russian-made products with state symbols to be purchased for such gifts. "These are not just Russian manufacturers—this is when you are a patriot from birth, when you have the tricolor, the coat of arms. Your very first clothes already say that you were born in Russia, that you are needed by Russia, that you are important, that you are loved from birth," she explained.

In 2025, Butskaya reported the development of a draft law against quadrobears and furries, which would ban "the dissemination of information promoting the ideology of dehumanization among children."

In February 2026, Butskaya, speaking on the Govorit Moskva radio station, proposed banning access to porn sites for Russians who do not have children.

In February 2026, Butskaya proposed “repurposing” Valentine’s Day, celebrated on February 14, by renaming the holiday in order to move away from mentioning Saint Valentine “with his ambiguous history,” and suggested renaming it “Plush Toy Day” or “Love Day”.

== Personal life ==
Tatiana Butskaya is married to entrepreneur Vladimir Butsky. They have sons Boris (born 2003) and Andrey (born 2011).

She leads an active lifestyle: she runs.

== Sanctions ==
She was sanctioned by the UK government in 2022 in relation to the Russo-Ukrainian War.
