= Mikhail Timonov =

Russian politician

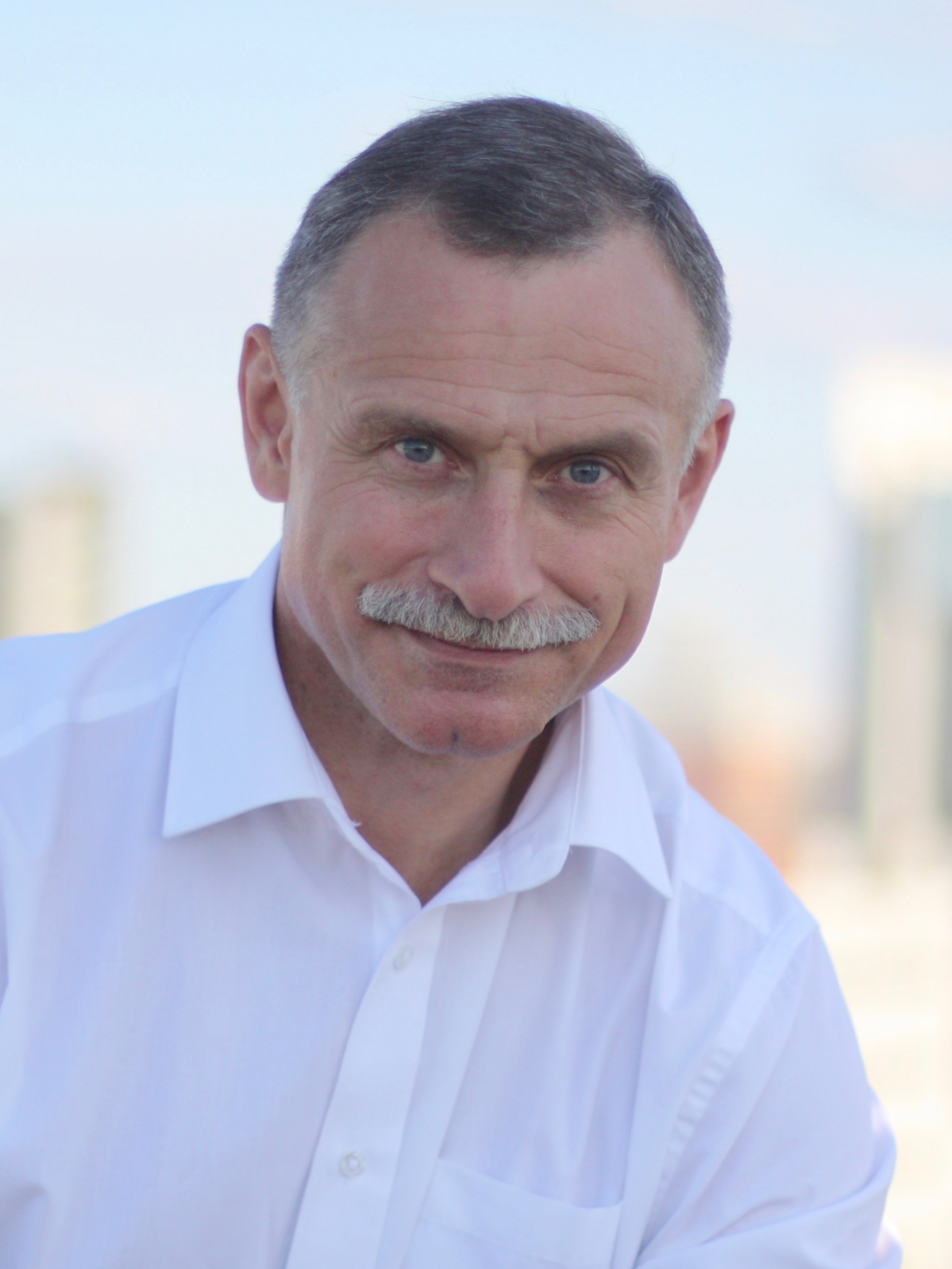

Member of the Moscow City Duma
- In office 8 September 2019 – 18 September 2024
- Preceded by: Anton Molev
- Succeeded by: Yelena Yamshchikova
- Parliamentary group: A Just Russia
- Constituency: №16

Personal details
- Born: Mikhail Leonidovich Timonov; 22 May 1965 (age 61) Moscow, Russian SFSR, Soviet Union
- Party: Independent
- Other political affiliations: A Just Russia (since 2014)
- Education: Moscow Aviation Institute
- Website: https://timonov.info

Mikhail Leonidovich Timonov (Russian: Михаил Леонидович Тимонов; born 22 May 1965 in Moscow, USSR) is a Russian politician. Member of the Moscow City Duma, leader of the Opposition (2019 – 2024).

== Biography ==
Born on September 22 May 1965 in Moscow, RSFSR. Graduated from the Moscow Aviation Institute.

== 2019 Moscow City Duma election ==
Mikhail won the elections to the Moscow City Duma of the seventh convocation in the 16th single-mandate constituency (the districts Bogorodskoye, Preobrazhenskoye, part of Sokolinaya Gora), receiving 12.293 votes (37.6%). Member of the commissions for urban planning, state property and land use, environmental policy, urban management and housing policy.

He was supported by Alexei Navalny's "Smart Voting" system. From September to November 2019 Michail Timonov led A Just Russia in Moscow City Duma and was suspended due to vote against the draft budget of Moscow for 2020.

In June 2023, Timonov was declared a 'foreign agent' by the Russian Ministry of Justice. On May 15, 2024 Vladimir Putin signed a law, which prohibits foreign agents to run in any elections in Russia until the status of foreign agents is revoked, which automatically disqualified Timonov from running for re-election.

== Electoral history ==
=== Moscow City Duma elections ===
==== 2014 ====
2014 Moscow City Duma election (16th constituency)
Candidate	Party	Votes	%
Anton Molev	United Russia	14.476	45.85%
Denis Parfenov	CPRF	6.098	19.32%
Mikhail Timonov	A Just Russia	4.431	14.04%
Elena Grishchenko	Yabloko	3.324	10.53%
Nikolai Lazarev	LDPR	1.422	4.50%
Marat Mustafin		729	2.31%

==== 2019 ====
2019 Moscow City Duma election (16th constituency)
Candidate	Party	Votes	%
Mikhail Timonov	A Just Russia	12.293	37.57%
Anton Molev (incumbent)	United Russia	10.419	31.85%
Alexandra Andreeva	CPRF	5.855	17.90%
Tatiana Gordienko	CPCR	1.466	4.48%
Vera Kosova	LDPR	1.395	4.26%
Alexandra Andreeva		1.290	3.94%
