= Novokosino (Moscow Metro) =

Moscow Metro station

Novokosino Новокосино
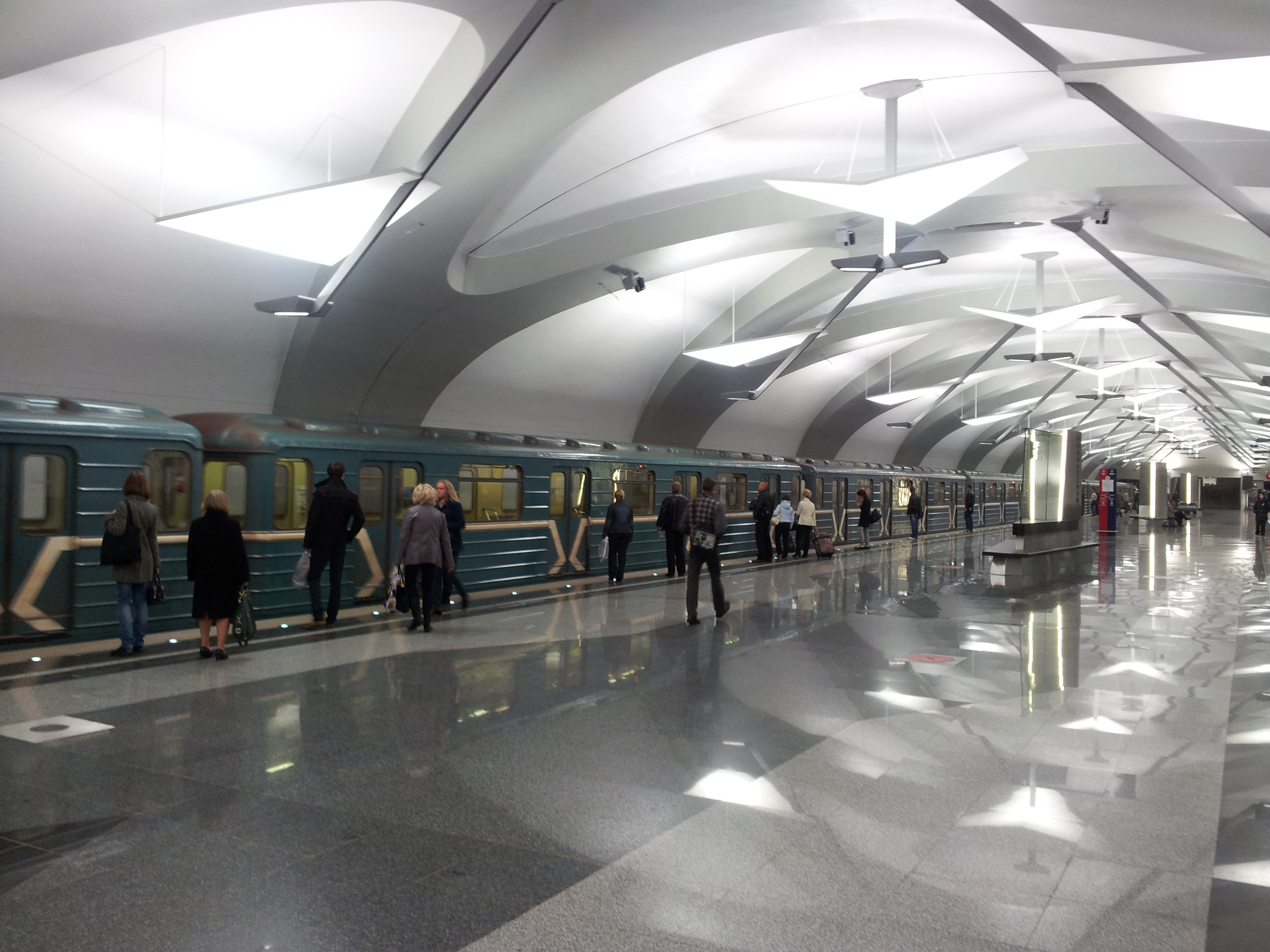

General information
- Location: Nosovikhinskoye Road, Novokosino District, Eastern Administrative Okrug; Moscow; Russia
- Coordinates: 55.7451°N 37.8638°E
- System: Moscow Metro station
- Owner: Moskovsky Metropoliten
- Line: Kalininskaya line
- Platforms: 1
- Tracks: 2

Construction
- Structure type: Shallow single vault
- Depth: 9 metres (30 ft)
- Platform levels: 1
- Parking: Yes
- Accessible: yes

Other information
- Station code: 163

History
- Opened: 30 August 2012; 13 years ago

Services
Preceding station	Moscow Metro	Following station
Novogireyevo towards Tretyakovskaya	Kalininsko-Solntsevskaya line (Kalininsky radius)	Terminus
Route map
Location
- Location within Moscow Metro

Novokosino (Russian: Новокосино) is a station on the Kalininsko-Solntsevskaya Line of the Moscow Metro. The station is situated at the northern edge of Novokosino District, adjacent to the Reutov town of Moscow Oblast. After its inauguration in 2012, it replaced Novogireyevo as the eastern terminus of Kalininskaya Line.
