= High school No. 1637 (Moscow) =

High school in Moscow, Russia

Coordinates: 55.7596°N 37.7835°E

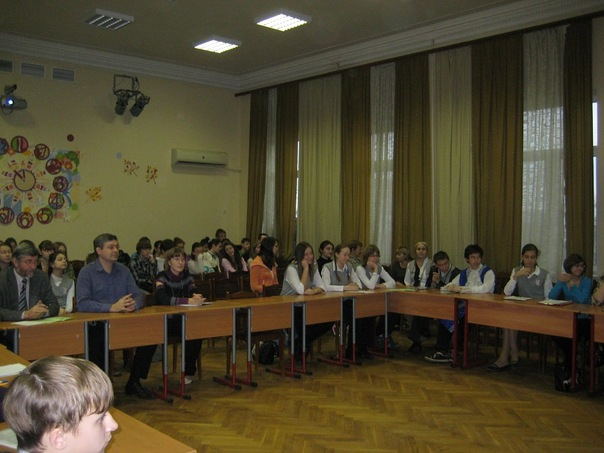

High School No. 1637 (Russian: Гимназия №1637) is a high school located in the Perovo District of eastern Moscow, Russia. Grammar School No. 1637 is a pre-and-elementary school located at Federated Avenue and 3rd VladimirStreet, 12A. The former building for school No. 635 was located on Novogireevskaya Street, 22A. The grammar school is open five days a week, which is known as "full-time mode." The school focuses on artistic and aesthetic training. Children are taught fine arts and music starting from the first grade. World culture is taught in fifth grade. Foreign language education, particularly English, begins in second grade.

== School history ==
- Secondary School No. 736 was founded in 1955 in Perovo.
- In 1989, the school was awarded the status of teaching specialized subjects of artistic and aesthetic cycle, later known as the educational field "Art."
- In 1993, school number 736 and kindergarten number +1626 were integrated into the educational complex number 1637, with specialized subjects of artistic and aesthetic cycle.
- From 2003 to 2014, the education center worked as a part of an urban experimental site involving "modernization of artistic and aesthetic education in experimental activities."
- In December 2005, the school was granted the status of HBOU Education Center No. 1637.
- In 2014, the status changed to school.
- In 2015, Gymnasium No. 1637 combined with an average educational school No. 635 (Novohyryeyevskaya Street, 22A).

== School achievements ==
As of 2014, the school enrolled around 900 students, and employed about 100 teachers, 27 of whom had higher qualifications and 11 of whom held the title of "Honored Worker of General Education." Several members of the teaching staff had won various stages of the Moscow "Teacher of the Year" contest(including IA Danilov, the winner of the district stage of competition of educational excellence and public recognition known better as "Teacher of the Year in Moscow 2012", and AV Rybaulina, the winner of the city contest "Teacher of the Year Moscow - 2012"). Rybaulina Olga is one of the authors of the Perovo District, along with English teachers Vasina, Zavyalova, Dimitrenko, and others.
