= Alexander Dovgopol =

Russian politician, lawyer and businessman

- Born: Alexander Ivanovich Dovgopol; November 12, 1965 (age 60); Kiev, USSR
- Occupation: politician

Alexander Ivanovich Dovgopol (Russian: Александр Иванович Довгопол; born November 12, 1965) is a Russian politician, lawyer and businessman. On June 6, 2013 he became the head of the Perovo District. He is a member of United Russia.

== Early life ==
Alexander Dovgopol was born on November 12, 1965, in the village of Barakhta Kiev region. In Moscow External University of Humanities he received yurist. Takzhe profession received higher professional education at the Moscow Institute of national and regional relations. He attended Moscow External University of Humanities. He has higher professional education in law.

== Career ==
In 2008 Alexander was appointed head of the municipal formation of intra-municipal entity Perovo in Moscow.

In 2012 in connection with the re-election of deputies of the municipal assembly of the municipality of intra Perovo in Moscow, he was reappointed as Perovo head.

On June 6, 2013 he was appointed head of the district council Perovo Moscow City.

=== Positions ===
- Deputy district municipality Perovo
- Head of the district council Perovo
- Deputy Municipal Assembly of the municipality of intra Perovo
- Head of the municipal formation of intra-municipal entity Perovo

== Personal life ==
Alexander Dovgopol is married with one daughter.

== Controversy ==
At a May 18, 2016 meeting, in response to a question about the construction of the Moscow district of Perovo chord near the houses, the destruction of trees, the noise and dirt, Dovgopol formally proposed that Muscovites sell their apartment and move away. Residents complained to Sergey Sobyanin.

On January 29, 2016 he issued a complaint against his daughter and her common law husband and sister. His daughter claimed that she had an alibi and additional evidence of the incident.
