= Sergei Zheleznyak =

Russian politician

Sergei Zheleznyak MP
- Сергей Железняк
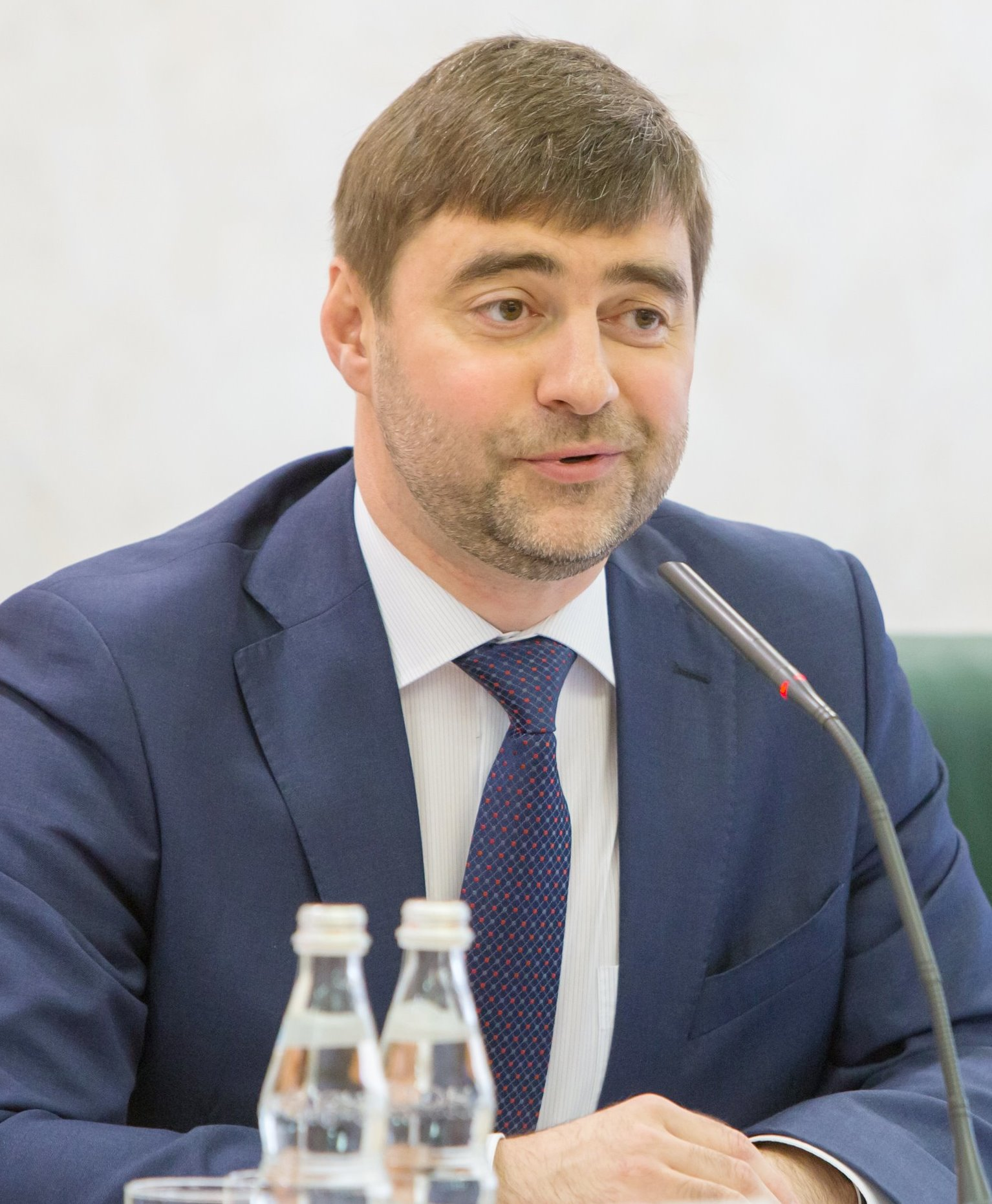
- Zheleznyak in 2014

Member of the State Duma for Moscow
- In office 5 October 2016 – 12 October 2021
- Preceded by: constituency re-established
- Succeeded by: Tatyana Butskaya
- Constituency: Perovo (No. 204)

Deputy Secretary of the General Council of United Russia
- In office 2011 – 26 July 2018

Personal details
- Born: 28 October 1976 (age 49) Leningrad, RSFSR, USSR
- Party: United Russia
- Sergei Zheleznyak's voice From the Echo of Moscow program, 20 May 2013

Sergei Vladimirovich Zheleznyak (Russian: Серге́й Влади́мирович Железня́к; born 1970) is a Russian politician. In 2007 he was elected as a member of State Duma and became its deputy chairman in June 2012. He was a member of the State Duma's Committee on International Affairs. Prior to his political career he was an advertising, media, and public relations executive.

Following his nomination Zheleznyak co-authored a law which allowed the government to block websites that it sees harmful for children. He also co-authored a law which would force internationally funded non-profit organizations to register as "foreign agents". In 2013 he spoke to RIA Novosti about prohibition of pedophilia in theatres after seeing a Golden Mask winner play called A Midsummer Night's Dream. In May of the same year Zheleznyak suggest the Duma to pass a bill that would make criticism of the World War II coalition member states' illegal and will be punished by imprisonment for up to 3 years. In June 2013 he told Economics and Life online journal that

"The US, which presents itself as a bastion of democracy, has in fact been carrying out minute-by-minute surveillance of tens of millions of citizens of Russia and other countries"

Following this remark which was in reference to Edward Snowden's leak, he referred to anti-gay law in Russia that it is an American reproach of sticking their noses into the personal correspondence of tens of millions of Russian citizens.

== Sanctions ==
As a result of the annexation of Crimea by the Russian Federation, the federal government of the United States under Barack Obama blacklisted Sergei Zheleznyak.

He was sanctioned by the UK government on 18 March 2014 in relation to actively supporting the use of Russian Armed Forces in Ukraine and the annexation of Crimea.

== Personal life ==
Zheleznyak's daughter, Anastasia Zheleznyak, lives in London. Two of his children were educated in the UK.
