= Kuskovo railway station =

Railway station in Moscow, Russia

Kuskovo Кусково
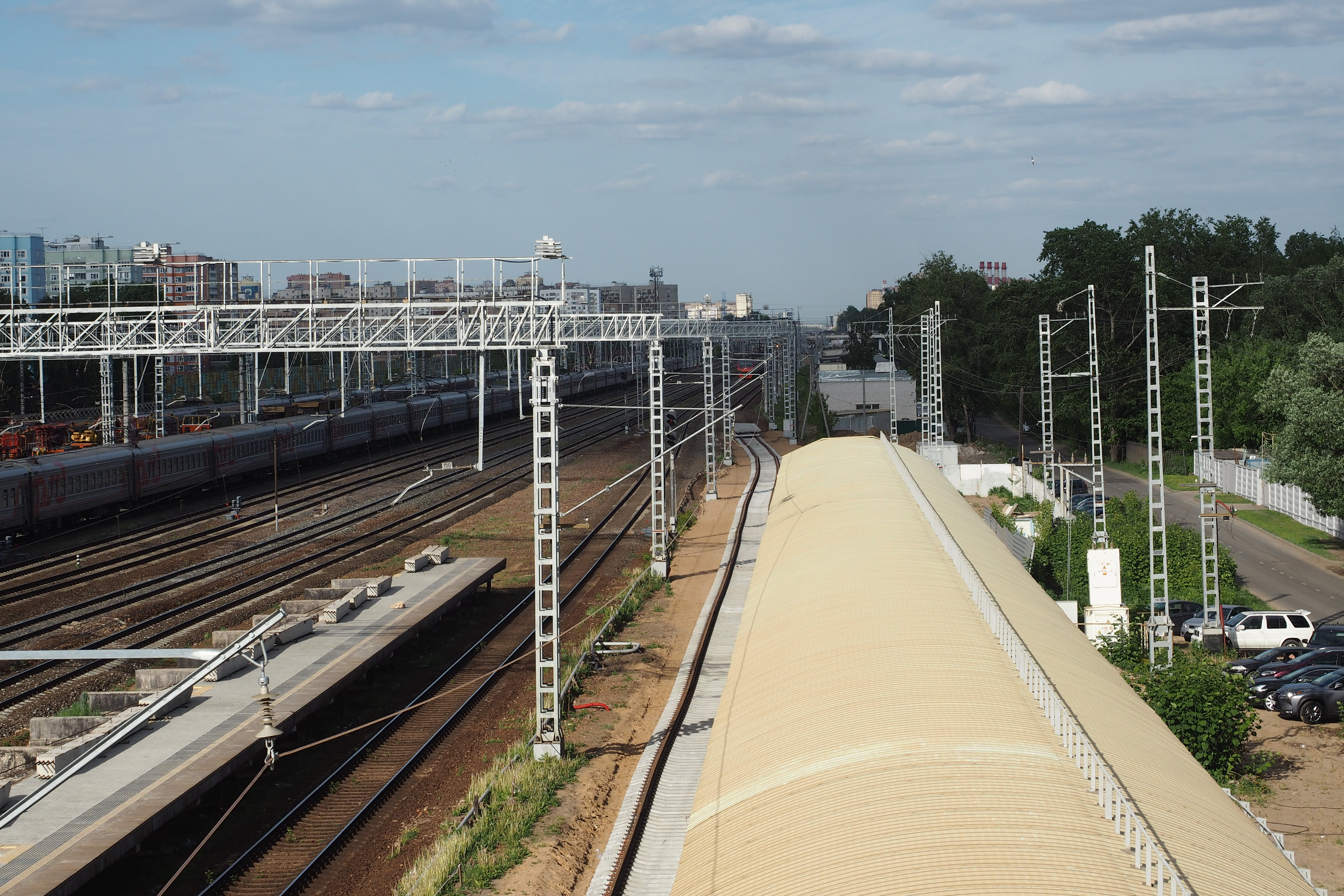

General information
- Location: Moscow; Russia
- Coordinates: 55.7394°N 37.7942°E
- System: Moscow Railway platform
- Owner: Russian Railways
- Operator: Moscow Railway
- Platforms: 2
- Tracks: 13

Construction
- Structure type: At-grade

History
- Opened: 1861

Services
Preceding station	Russian Railways	Following station
Chukhlinka towards Moscow Kursky	Gorkovsky Suburban	Novogireyevo towards Vladimir
Preceding station	Moscow Central Diameters	Following station
Novogireyevo towards Zheleznodorozhnaya	Line D4	Chukhlinka towards Aprelevka
Location

Kuskovo railway station is one of the oldest railway stations in Moscow, serving the Gorkovsky suburban railway line. Built in 1861, it is today one of the stops on Moscow Central Diameter 4 (MCD-4).

The station has two passenger platforms and an overhead pedestrian bridge.

The station is located at the border of Novogireyevo District and Veshnyaki District. There are Kuskovo Park and the historic Kuskovo Palace near the station.

== Gallery ==
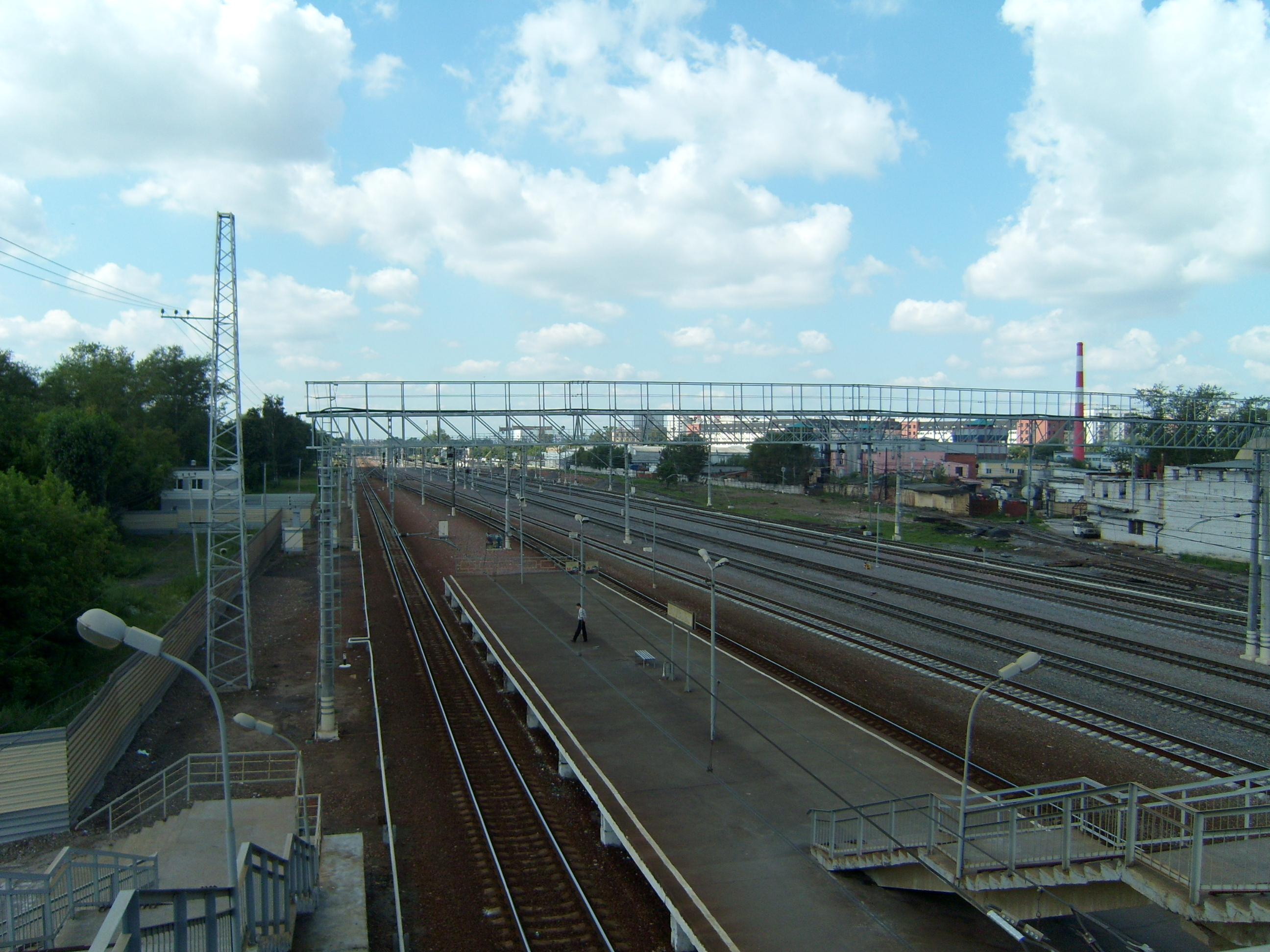
Station before reconstruction, in 2009

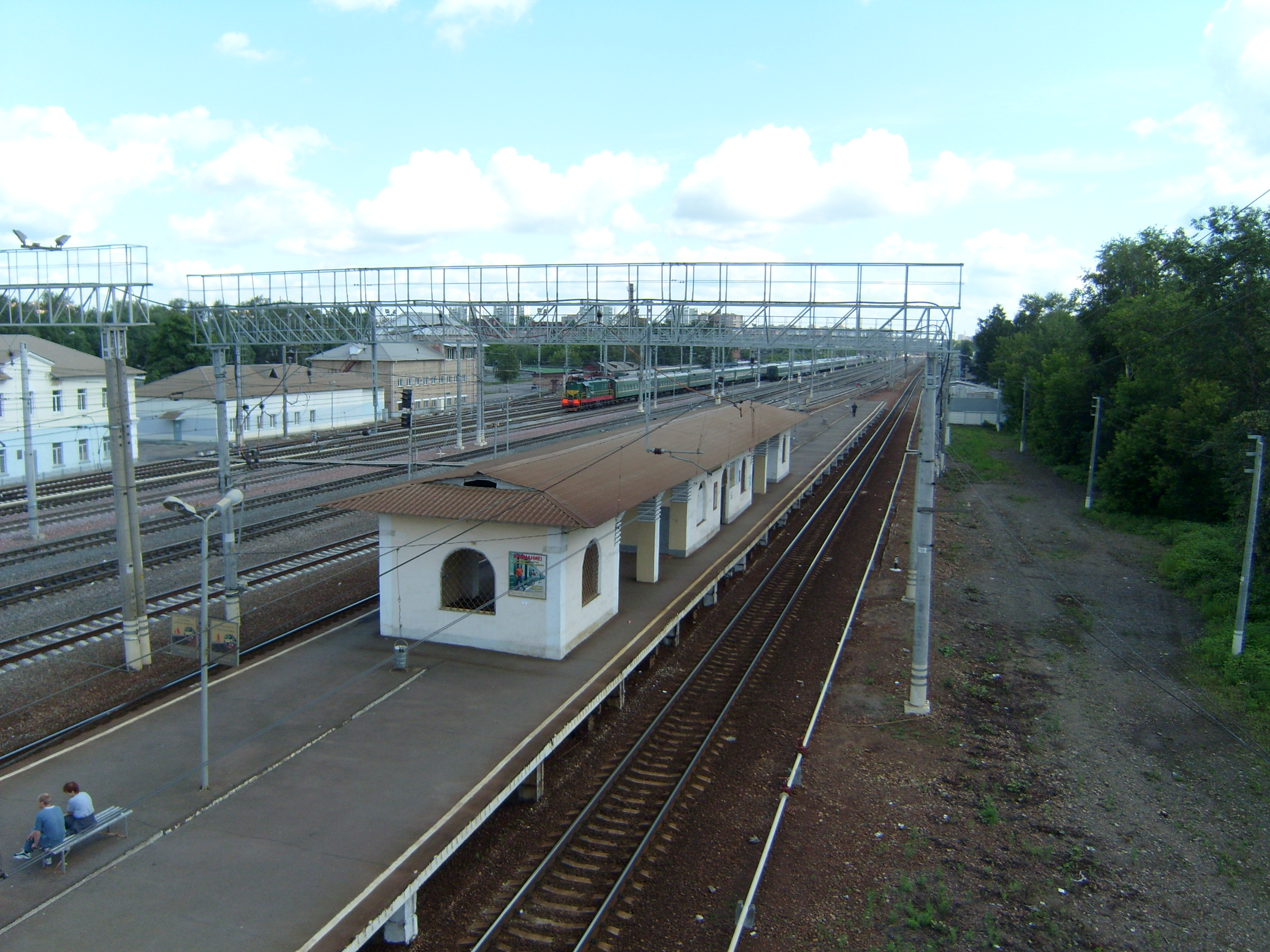

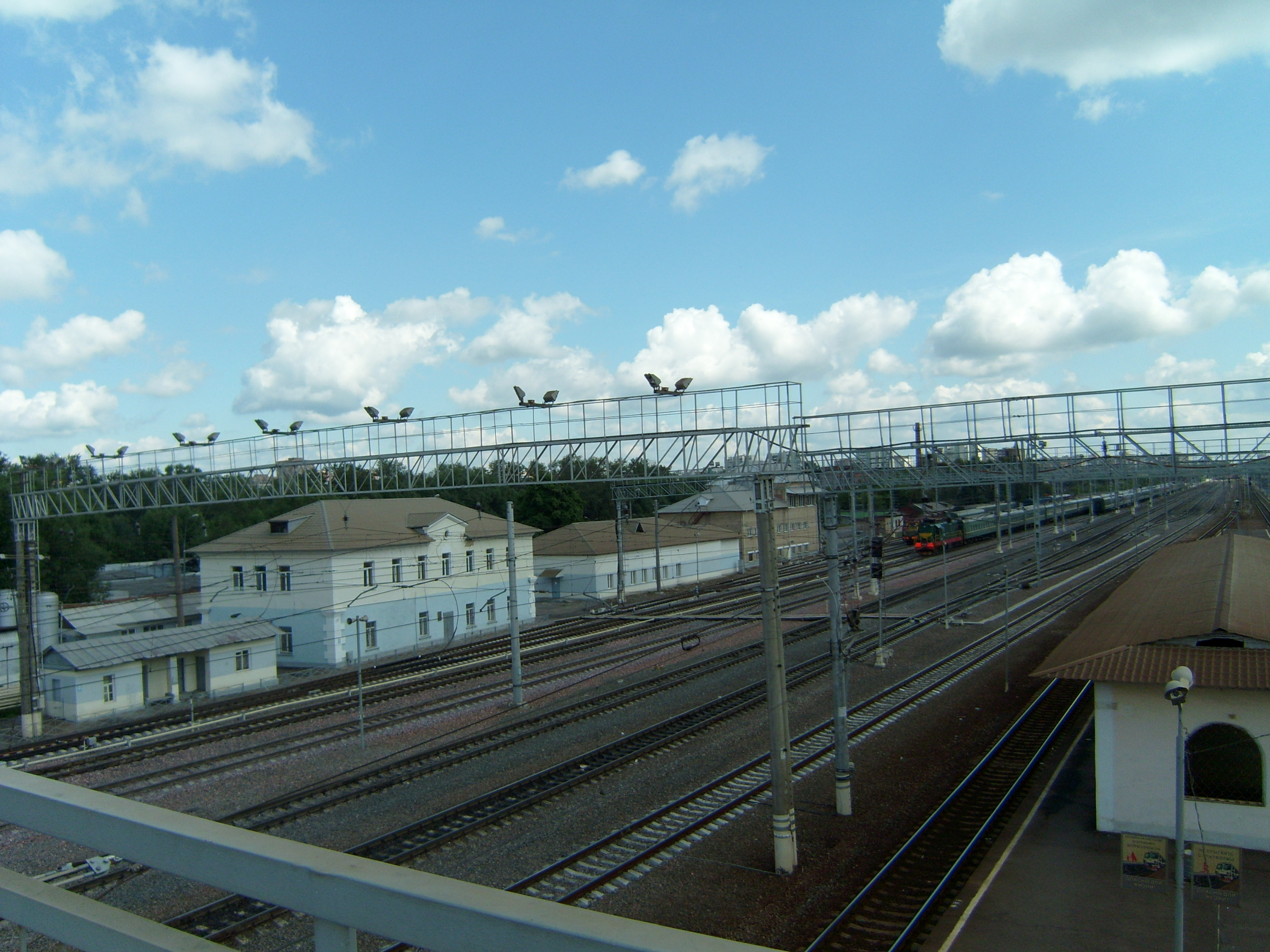
