= Novogireyevo (Moscow Metro) =

Moscow Metro station

Novogireyevo Новогиреево
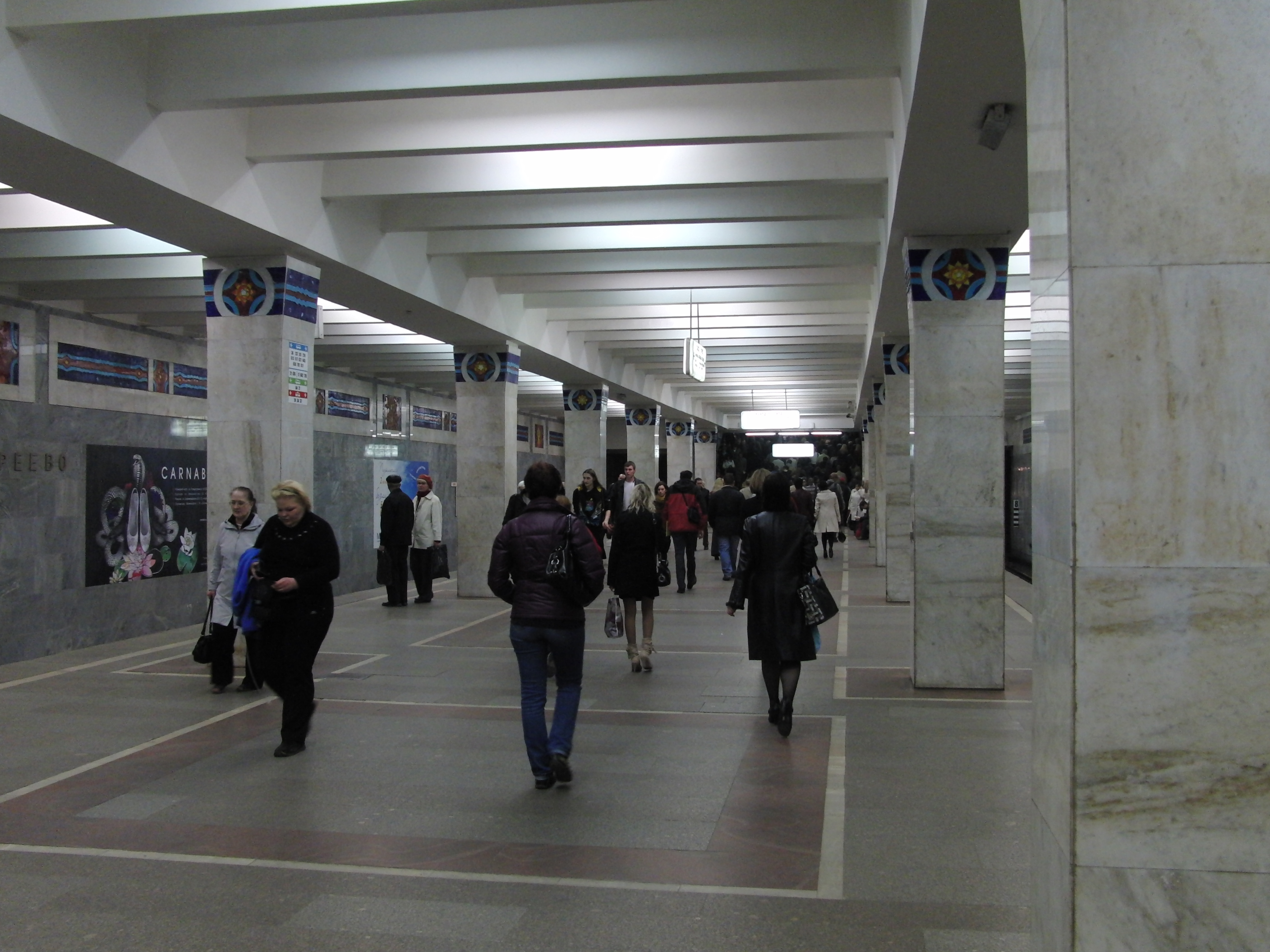

General information
- Location: Zelyony Avenue, Perovo District, Eastern Administrative Okrug; Moscow; Russia
- Coordinates: 55.7517°N 37.8166°E
- System: Moscow Metro station
- Owner: Moskovsky Metropoliten
- Line: Kalininskaya line
- Platforms: 1
- Tracks: 2
- Connections: Bus: 17, 21, 36, 237, 247, 276, 615, 617, 621, 645, 659, 662, 676, 776, 792, 811; Trolleybus: 64, 77; Tram: 24, 34, 37.

Construction
- Structure type: Shallow column tri-span
- Depth: 9 metres (30 ft)
- Platform levels: 1
- Parking: No

Other information
- Station code: 079

History
- Opened: 30 December 1979; 46 years ago

Services
Preceding station	Moscow Metro	Following station
Perovo towards Tretyakovskaya	Kalininsko-Solntsevskaya line (Kalininsky radius)	Novokosino Terminus
Route map
Location
- Location within Moscow Metro

Novogireyevo (Russian: Новогиреево) is a Moscow Metro station on the Kalininsko-Solntsevskaya Line. It was constructed in 1979 in Moscow's Novogireyevo District, as the final terminus of the Kalininsky radius. The status of terminus ended following the inauguration of Novokosino, extension to the east, on August 30, 2012. The station has entrances at both ends, and is at a depth of nine metres. About 110 000 passengers use Novogireyevo station daily.

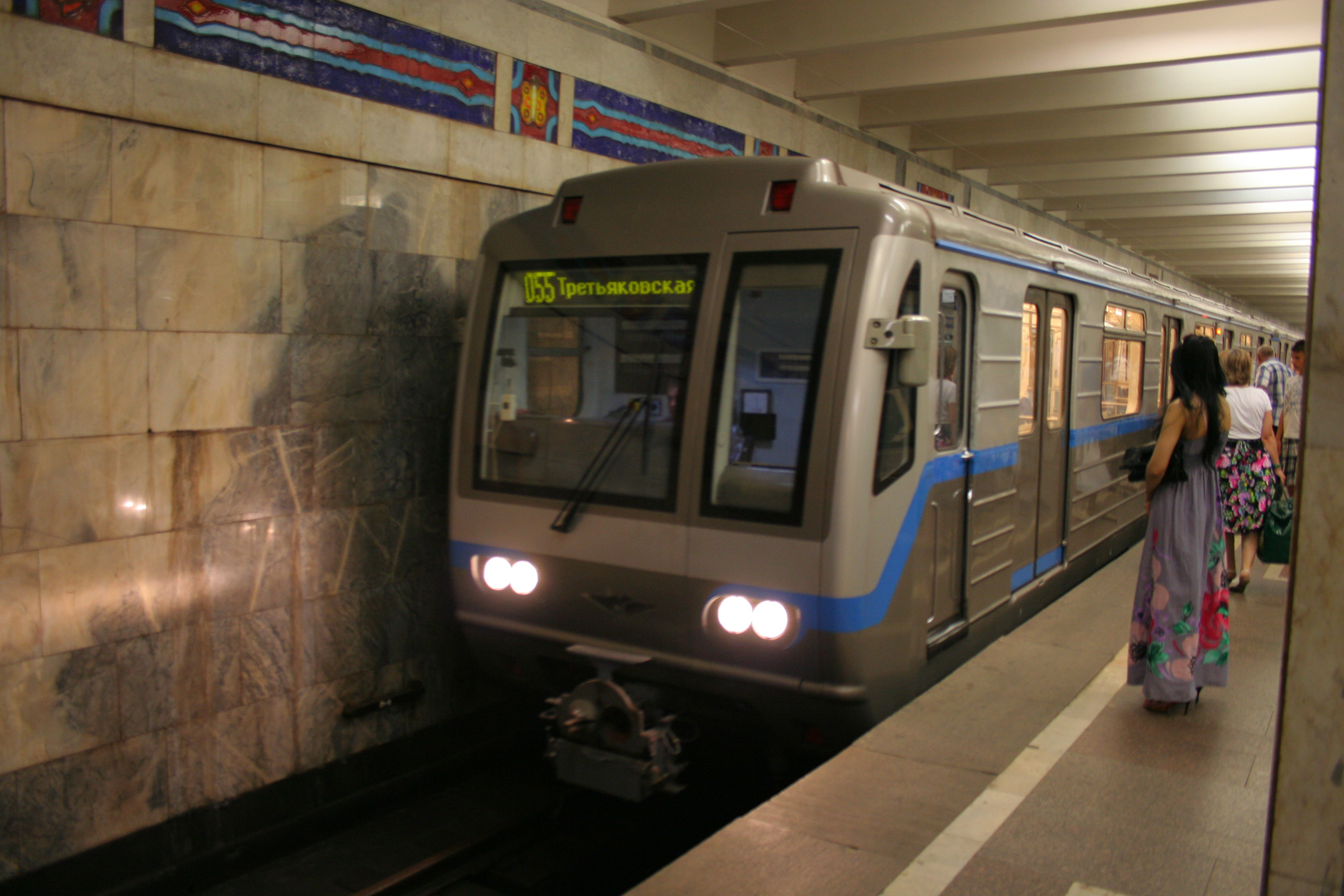
Platform with arriving train

== Architecture ==
The station was designed by Robert Pogrebnoi and Plyukhin. The station was the first of the newer version of the pillar-trispan with the step of the pillars further increased from 6 to 7 metres. The pillars are revetted with light-grey marble and the walls are revetted with steel blue marble. The upper parts of the pillars and the walls are decorated with friezes devoted to the nature of the Moscow area (by A. Kuznetsov). The floor is faced with slabs of red and brown granite and strips of white marble.
