= Valery Borshchyov =

Russian politician and civil rights activist (1943–2025)

- Валерий Борщёв
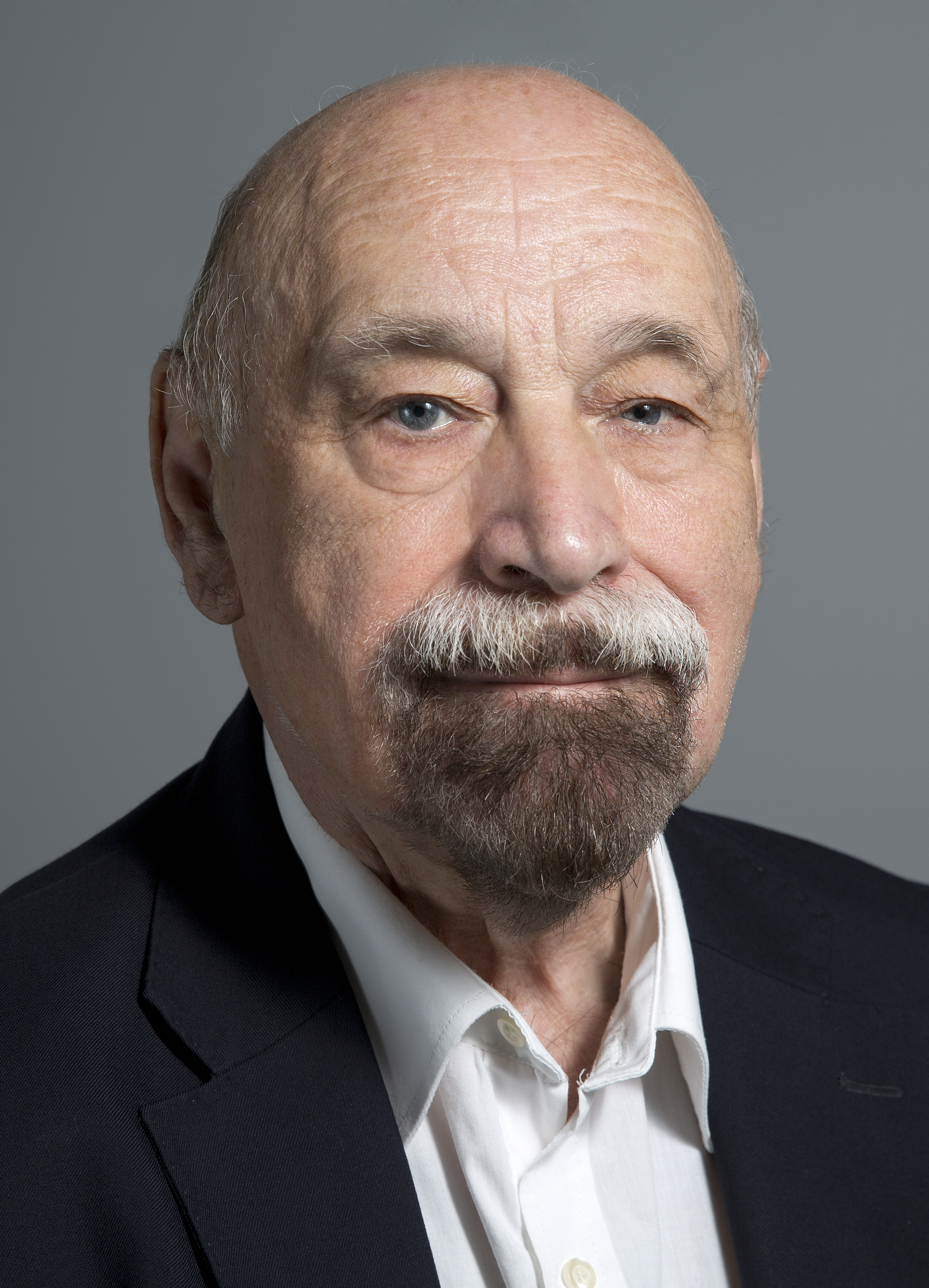
- Born: 1 December 1943; Tambov Oblast, Soviet Union
- Died: 3 November 2025 (aged 81)

Valery Vasilyevich Borshchyov (Russian: Валерий Васильевич Борщёв, alternatively transliterated Valery Borshchev; 1 December 1943 – 3 November 2025) was a Russian politician, human rights activist and journalist. He began actively protesting against Soviet policy and became actively involved in human rights work in the 1970s. He served as a member of the Mossoviet from 1990 to 1993 and in the State Duma from 1993 to 1999.

== Life and career ==
Borshchyov was born in Chernyanoye, Lysogorsky district, Tambov Oblast on 1 December 1943. He graduated from the Faculty of Journalism at Moscow State University. He started actively protesting against Soviet policy in 1973, and was inspired to do so due to the prosecution of Aleksandr Solzhenitsyn. He became actively involved in human rights work after he met Andrei Sakharov in 1975; Borshchyov's work led to him being banned from practicing journalism. During the 1980s, his actions as a dissident grew, he was harassed and beaten by the authorities and his work was labeled as "anti-Soviet propaganda" by the KGB. He was a member of the Mossoviet from 1990 to 1993. He was a member of the Moscow Helsinki Group and served as its co-chair from 2018.

According to the Moscow Helsinki Group, he helped evacuate women and children from combat areas during the First Chechen War. In 1995, Borshchyov volunteered to take the place of a hostage during the Budyonnovsk hostage crisis.

Borshchyov served in the State Duma from 1993 to 1999. As a member of parliament, he put forward legislation to strengthen human rights in Russia. He co-authored the law that governs public monitoring of detention facilities, which guided the creation of the Moscow Public Oversight Commission, which he eventually led. In 2001, Borshchyov was awarded the Medal "Defender of a Free Russia". In 2009, he was elected to serve as head of the Public Oversight Commission (POC). In this capacity, he led the team that used forensic evidence to prove that Sergei Magnitsky was murdered while in police custody, and did not die, as officially claimed, by a heart attack. Following the murder of Magnitsky, Borshchyov also underlined that a series of articles about the murder published in the New York Times ameliorated the situation and hoped the interest of the press might help bring the perpetrators to justice. Borshchyov spoke out against growing human rights abuses in Russia, stating in 2012 that Russia had entered "a new era of Stalin-like repressions". In 2017, he was awarded the Magnitsky Human Rights Award for Outstanding Human Rights Activist.

Borshchyov died on 3 November 2025, at the age of 81.
