= Sokolinaya Gora District =

- District
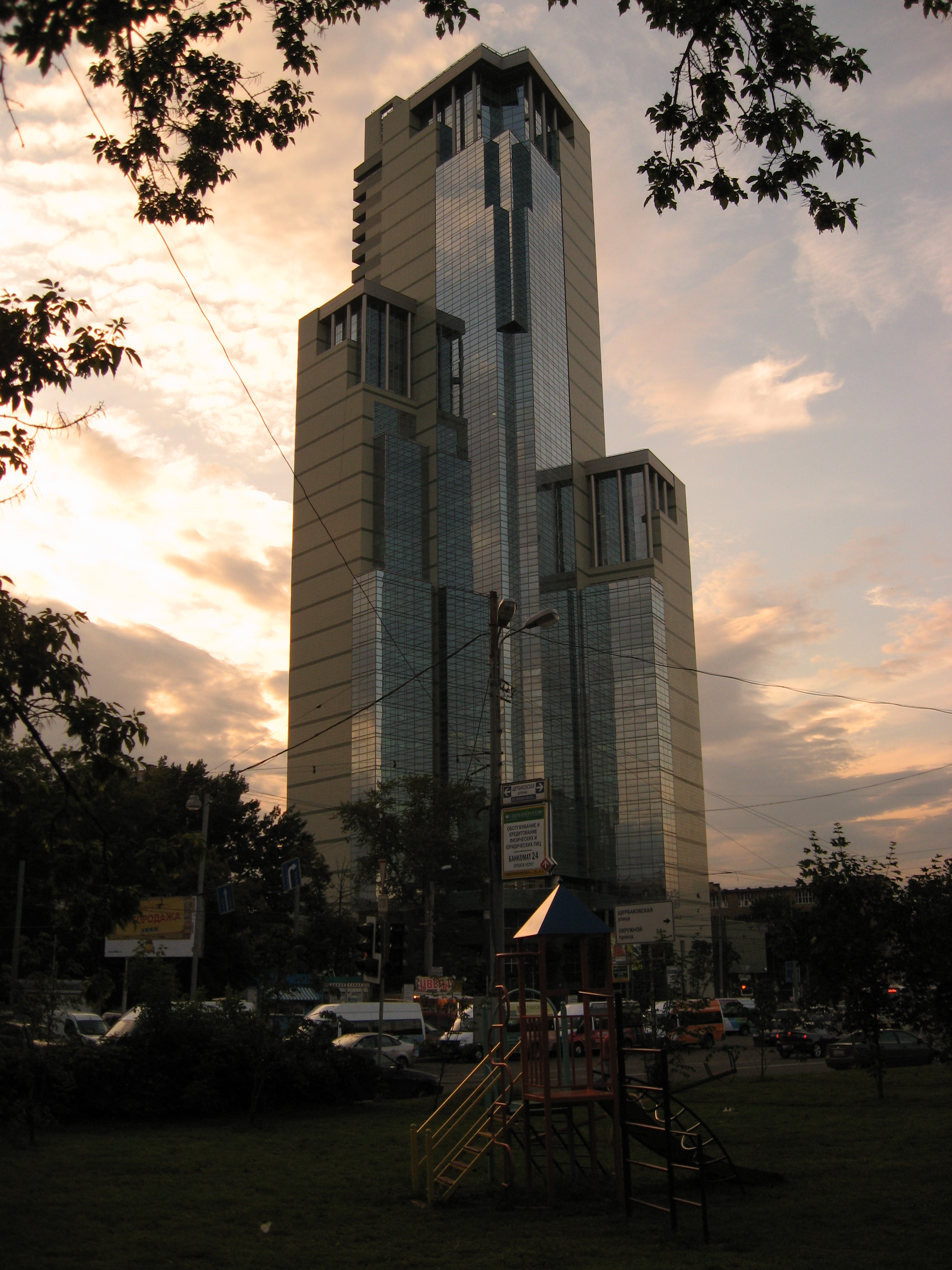
- Sokolinaya Gora District

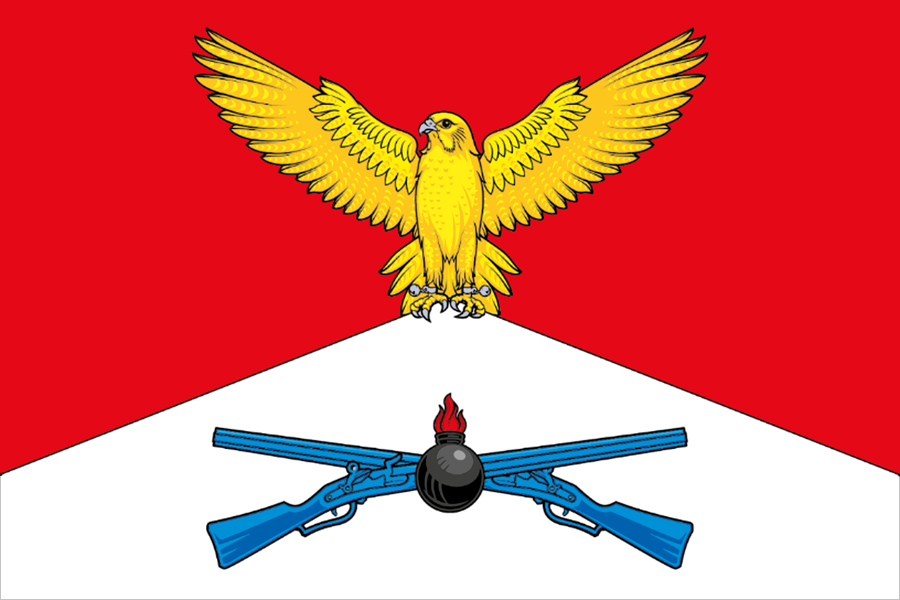
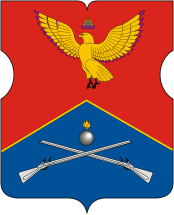
- Flag Coat of arms
- Location of Sokolinaya Gora District on the map of Moscow
- Coordinates: 55°46′11″N 37°43′52″E
- Country: Russia
- Federal subject: Moscow

Area
  - Total: 7.961 km^{2} (3.074 sq mi)
- Time zone: UTC+
- OKTMO ID: 45314000
- Website: http://sokolinka.mos.ru/

Sokolinaya Gora District (Russian: район Соколиная Гора, "Falcon Hill") is an administrative district (raion) of Eastern Administrative Okrug, and one of the 125 raions of Moscow, Russia. The area of the district is 7.961 square kilometers (3.074 sq mi). Population: 84,100 (2017 est.).

== See also ==
- Administrative divisions of Moscow
