= Novokosino District =

Novokosino District Новокосино
- District
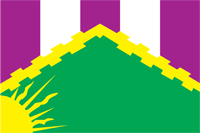
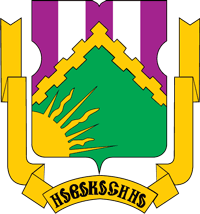
- Flag Coat of arms
- Location of Novokosino District on the map of Moscow
- Coordinates: 55°44′24″N 37°51′54″E
- Country: Russia
- Federal subject: Moscow
- Time zone: UTC+3 (MSK)
- OKTMO ID: 45310000
- Website: http://www.uprava-novokosino.ru/

Novokosino District (Russian: райо́н Новокосино́) is an administrative district (raion) of Eastern Administrative Okrug, and one of the 125 raions of Moscow, Russia. The area of the district is 3.60 square kilometers (1.39 sq mi).

== Sister cities ==
Novokosino District has many sister cities, as designated by Sister Cities International:

- Orange, California, United States of America

== Gallery ==
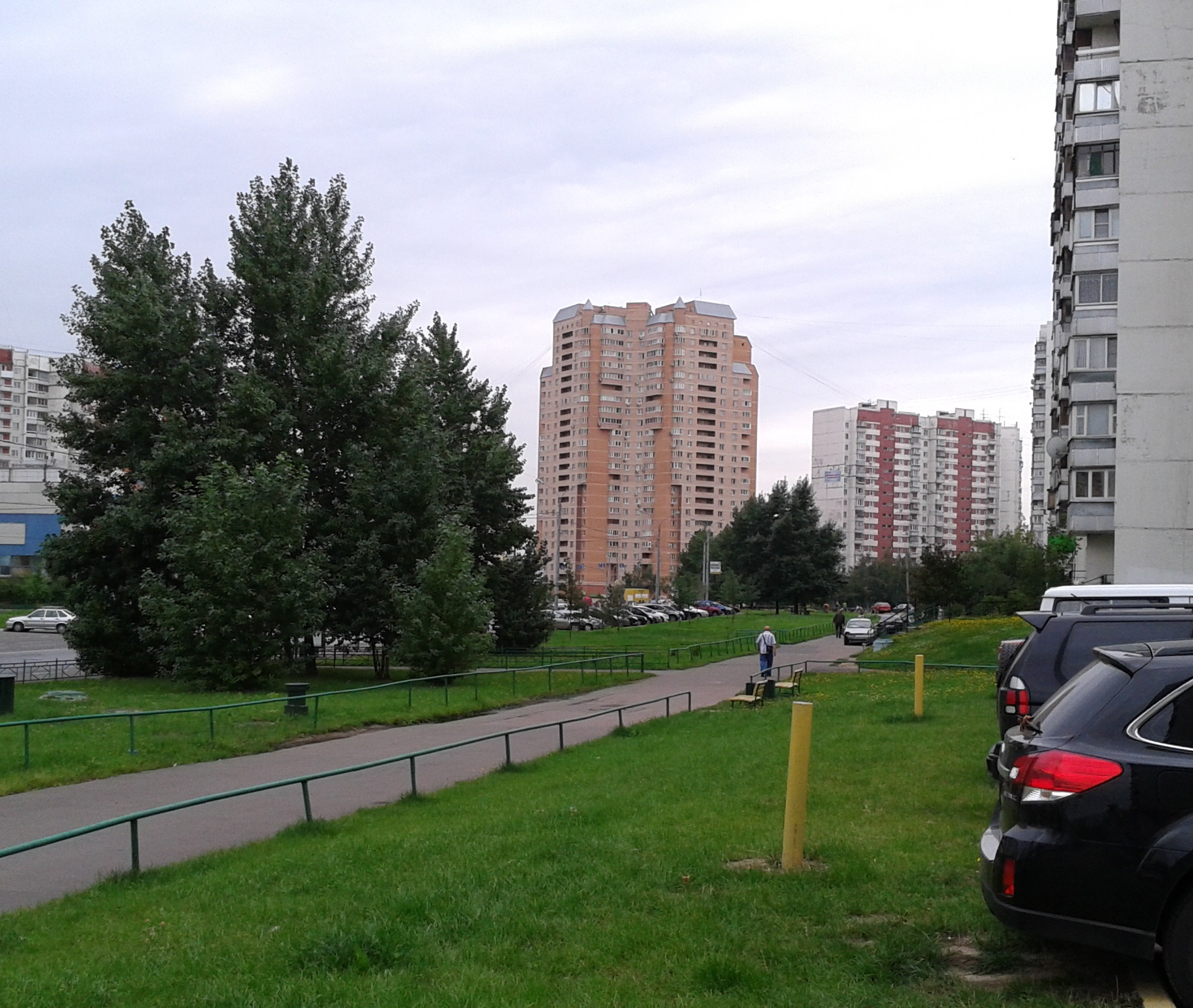
Novokosino

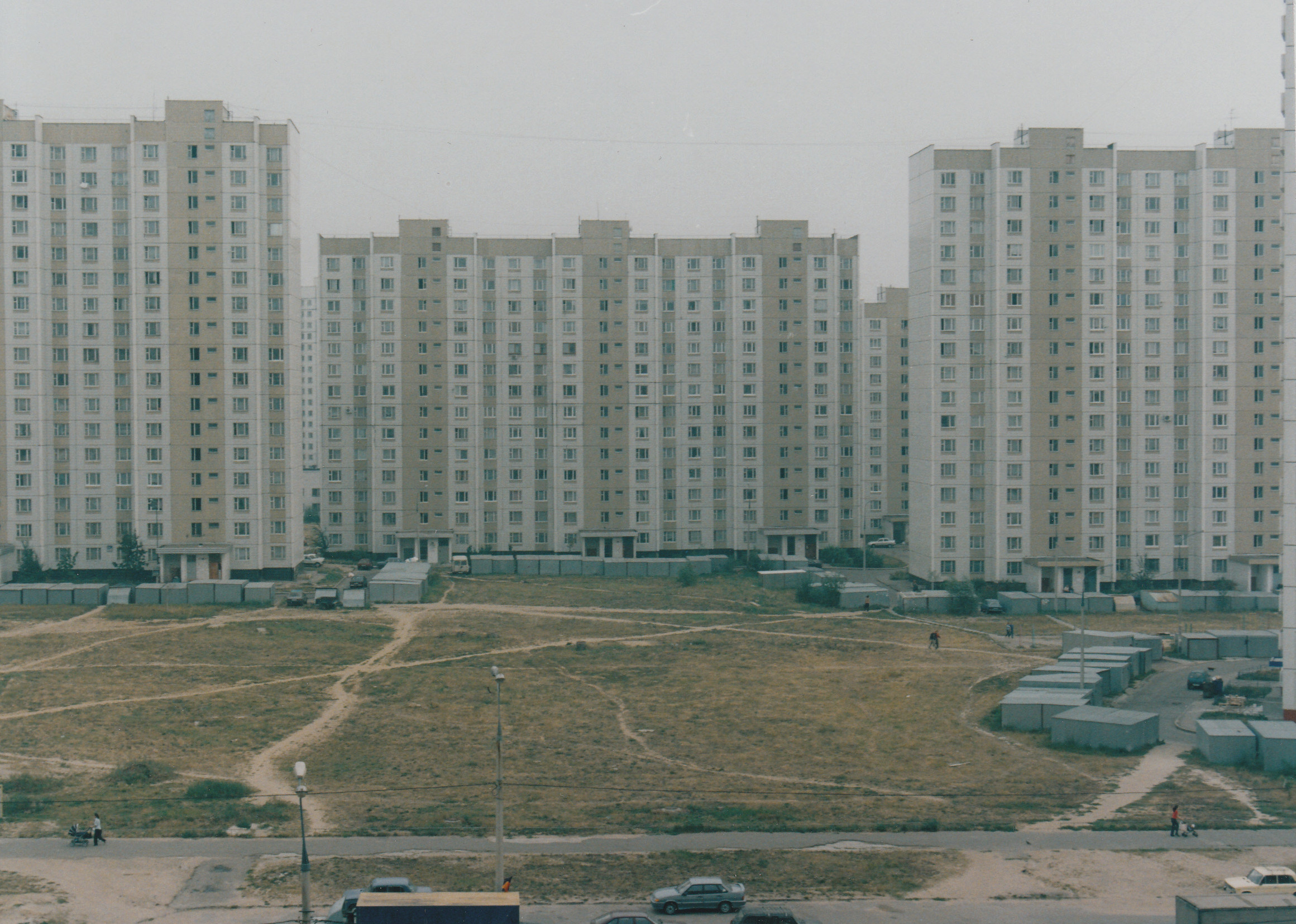
Standard buildings of Novokosino

== See also ==
- Administrative divisions of Moscow
