= Perovo District =

- District
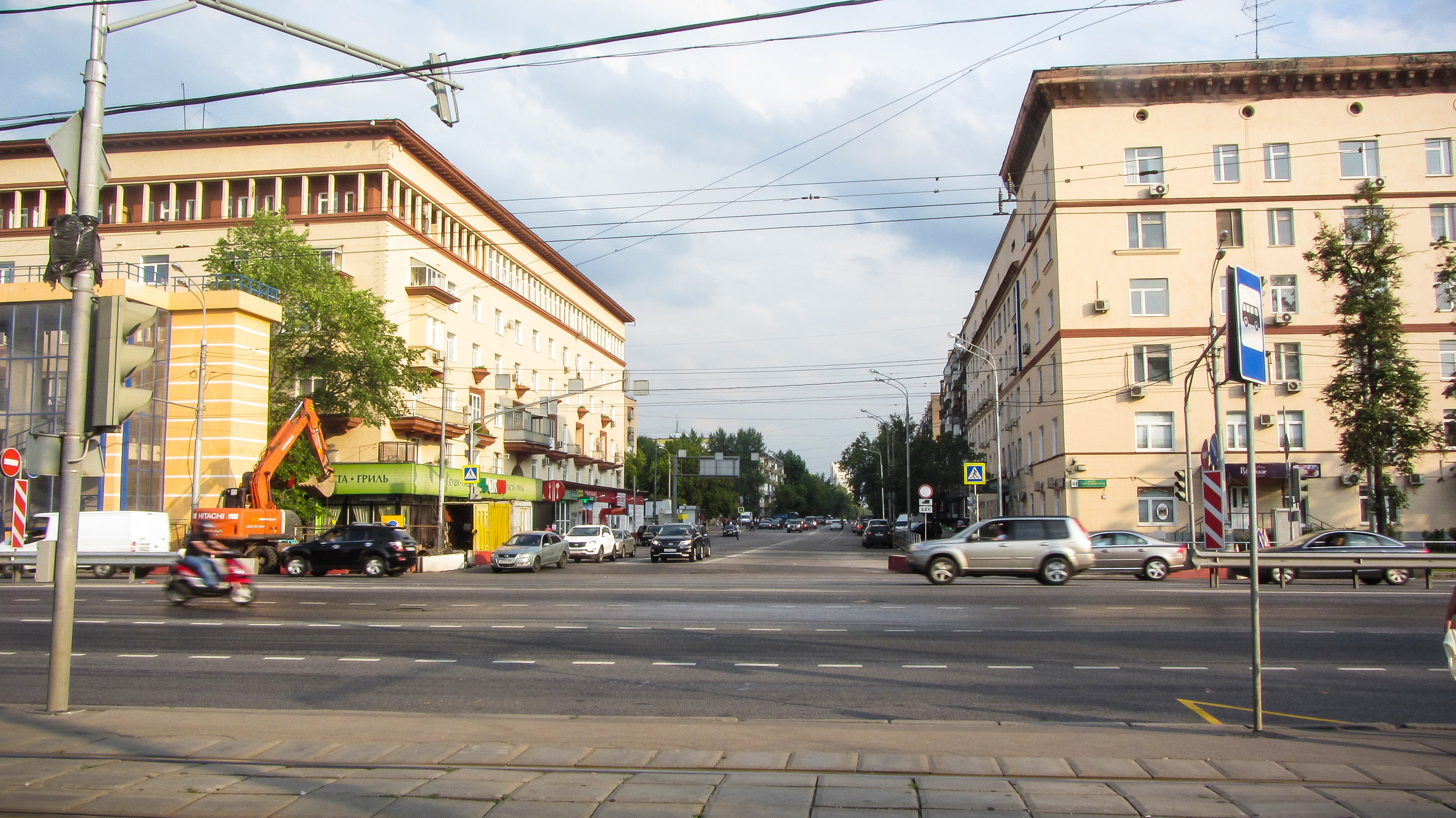
- 2nd Vladimirskaya street, Perovo District

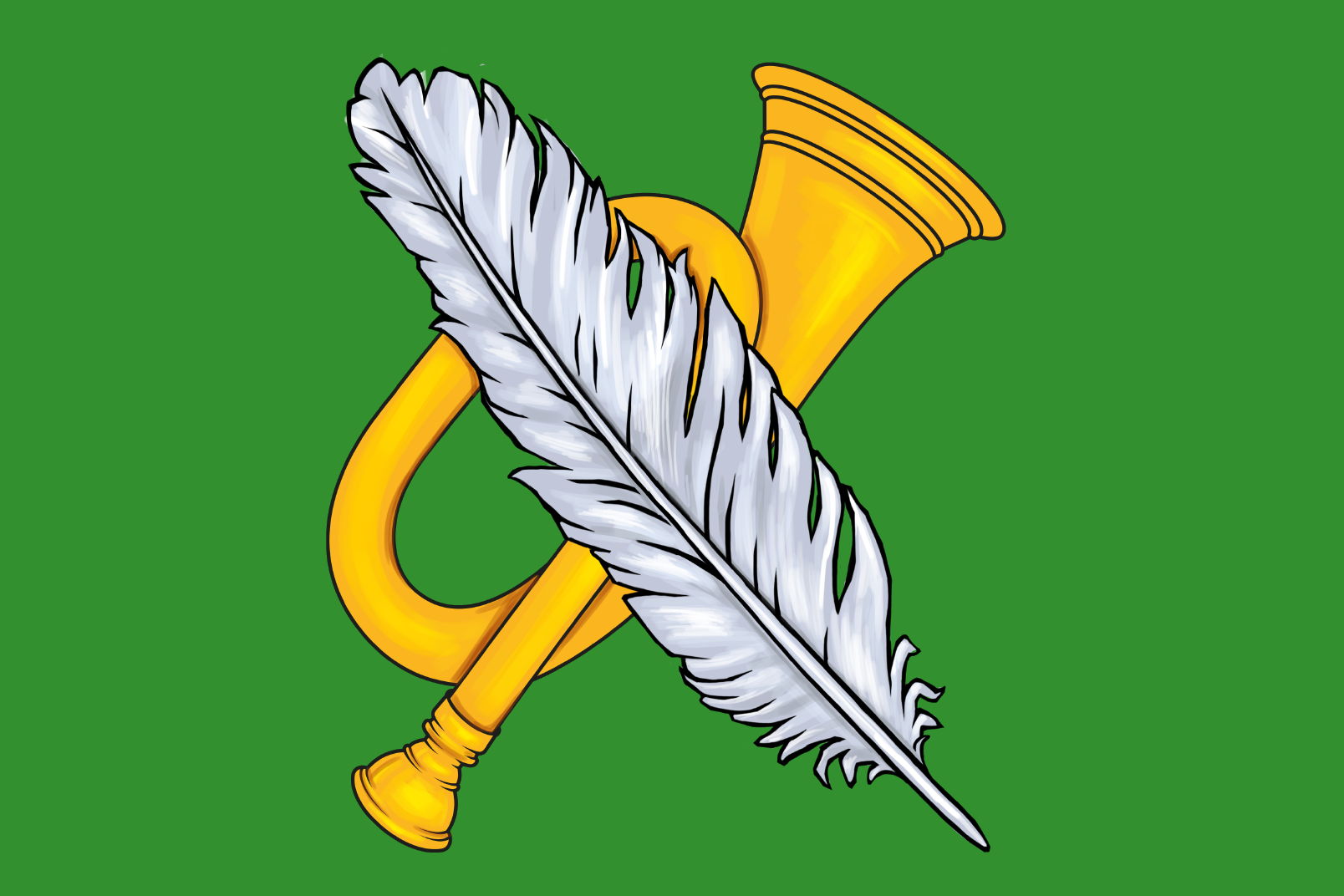
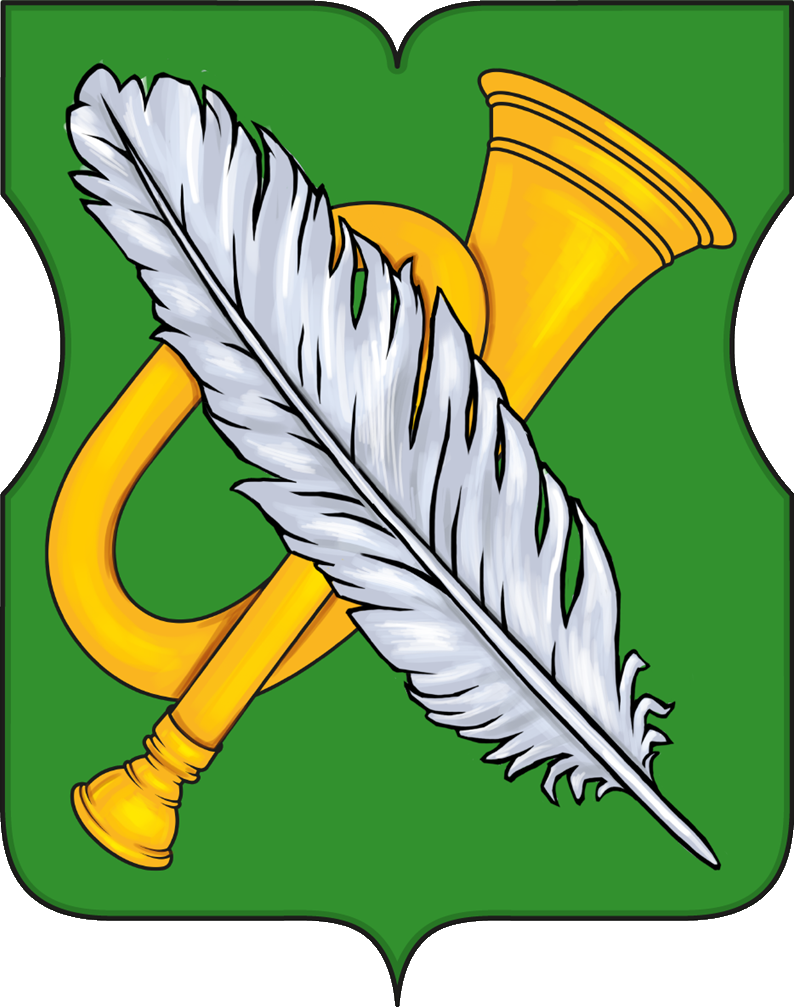
- Flag Coat of arms
- Location of Perovo District on the map of Moscow
- Coordinates: 55°44′29″N 37°46′29″E
- Country: Russia
- Federal subject: Moscow
- Established: 1960
- Time zone: UTC+
- OKTMO ID: 45312000
- Website: http://perovo.mos.ru/

Perovo District (Russian: райо́н Перо́во) is an administrative district (raion) of Eastern Administrative Okrug, and one of the 125 raions of Moscow, Russia.

== Education ==
High school No. 1637 is located in the district.

== See also ==
- Administrative divisions of Moscow
