= Ali Fayad (arms dealer) =

Lebanese-born Ukrainian arms dealer

Ali Taan Fayad
- Born: Ali Taan Fayad; Lebanon

Ali Taan Fayad (Arabic: علي طعان فياض), also known as Ali Amin, is a Lebanese-born Ukrainian arms dealer.

== History ==
On 26 March 2014, he was indicted by a court in New York on charges including 'conspiracy to kill officers and employees of the United States', 'conspiracy to acquire and transport anti-aircraft missiles', 'conspiracy to commit money laundering', 'conspiracy to import cocaine into the United States' and 'conspiracy to provide material support or resources to a foreign terrorist organisation'.

In April 2014, Fayad was arrested alongside Fawzi Jaber and Khaled Marabi in a Prague hotel by undercover agents of the United States Drug Enforcement Administration, who were posing as members of the Revolutionary Armed Forces of Colombia. Fayad and his co-conspirators had met with the undercover DEA agents in Ghana and Warsaw as part of a two-year sting operation named Project Cassandra. Fayad had agreed to provide twenty 9K38 Igla surface-to-air missiles and four-hundred rocket-propelled grenades for $8.3 million.

On 4 February 2016, Prague's Municipal Court ordered his release after Justice Minister Robert Pelikán refused to allow his extradition to the United States. According to then-Defense Minister Martin Stropnický, his extradition was refused as part of a deal to release five Czech citizens who had been kidnapped in Lebanon in July 2015 by Fayad's half-brother and other Hezbollah operatives. It has been suggested that the US government did not apply serious pressure on the Czech government to extradite Fayad due to their desire to achieve the Joint Comprehensive Plan of Action deal with Iran. Fayad is currently living in Lebanon under Hezbollah's protection.

== See also ==
- Drug economy in Lebanon
- Foreign relations of Hezbollah
- Funding of Hezbollah
- Chekri Mahmoud Harb
- Mohamad Noureddine
- Abdallah Safi-Al-Din
- Ayman Saied Joumaa
- Ali Mohamed Kharroubi
- Adham Tabaja
