= Ayman Saied Joumaa =

Colombian-Lebanese national and alleged drug kingpin

- Organization: Hezbollah (alleged)
- Criminal charges: Drug trafficking, money laundering

Ayman Saied Joumaa is a Colombian/Lebanese national and alleged drug kingpin. The US Treasury Department alleges that his organization launders money and traffics illicit drugs in the Americas, Middle East, Europe, and Africa, and that he has ties to Hezbollah and the Los Zetas cartel.

== Criminal activities and links to Hezbollah ==
On January 26, 2011, the US Treasury Department's Office of Foreign Assets Control (OFAC) listed him as a Specially Designated Narcotics Trafficker under the Foreign Narcotics Kingpin Designation Act. This was due to Joumaa's money-laundering operations supporting Hezbollah's activities, as investigated during Project Cassandra.

== Legal proceedings ==
On November 23, 2011, a federal grand jury in Alexandria, Virginia, indicted Joumaa for distributing tens of thousands of kilograms of cocaine from Colombia through Central America to Los Zetas in Mexico and for laundering millions of dollars' worth of drug money from Mexico, Europe, and West Africa to Colombia and Venezuela.

== See also ==
- Aly Fayad
- Drug economy in Lebanon
- Foreign relations of Hezbollah
- Funding of Hezbollah
