= Funding of Hezbollah =

The funding of Hezbollah comes from Lebanese business groups, private persons, businessmen, the Lebanese diaspora involved in African diamond exploration, other Islamic groups and countries, and the taxes paid by the Shia Lebanese. Hezbollah says that the main source of its income comes from its own investment portfolios and donations by Muslims.

Western sources maintain that Hezbollah receives most of its financial, training, weapons, explosives, political, diplomatic, and organizational aid from the Islamic Republic of Iran and Ba'athist Syria. Iran is said to have given $400 million between 1983 and 1989 through donation. The situation changed due to economic problems, but in 2013 Iran still funded humanitarian efforts carried on by Hezbollah. According to reports released in February 2010, Hezbollah received $400 million from Iran. In 2011, Iran earmarked $7 million to Hezbollah's activities in Latin America. Hezbollah also receives financial and political assistance, as well as weapons and training, from Iran. Iranian support to Hezbollah has varied over the years, but as of 2018 US officials estimate Iran transfers $700 million annually.

Hezbollah has relied also on funding from the Shi'ite Lebanese Diaspora in West Africa, the United States and, most importantly, the Triple Frontier, or tri-border area, along the junction of Argentina, Brazil, and Paraguay. U.S. law enforcement officials have identified an illegal multimillion-dollar cigarette-smuggling fund raising operation and a drug smuggling operation. However, Nasrallah has repeatedly denied any links between the South American drug trade and Hezbollah, calling such accusations "propaganda" and attempts "to damage the image of Hezbollah".

== International sanctions ==
As at October 2019, Hezbollah is subject to sanctions from a number of countries and international organisations that seek to stop funding to designated terrorist organisations, that includes Hezbollah. Banks, including Lebanese banks, are required to comply with these sanctions. Banks that deal with parties that provide funds for Hezbollah (or other terrorist organisation) are liable to be barred from dealing in dollars, besides other sanctions.

The countries that ban transfers of funds to Hezbollah include: Argentina, Australia, Canada, Egypt, Israel, Japan, New Zealand, Paraguay, Saudi Arabia, United Arab Emirates, United Kingdom (partly), and the United States. Germany and the European Union outlawed only Hezbollah's military wing, and work with Hezbollah's political wing and allow it to raise funds in Europe.

The United States has accused members of the Venezuelan government of providing financial aid to Hezbollah. According to the testimony of a former Assistant Secretary of State for Western Hemisphere Affairs, Roger Noriega, Hugo Chávez's government gave "indispensable support" to Iran and Hezbollah in the Western Hemisphere. In an article by the conservative think tank the American Enterprise Institute, Noriega explained how two witnesses alleged that Ghazi Atef Nassereddine, a Venezuelan diplomat in Syria, was an operative of Hezbollah who used Venezuelan entities to launder money for Hezbollah with President Nicolás Maduro's personal approval.

In January 2022, the U.S. Department of the Treasury's Office of Foreign Assets Control (OFAC) designated Hezbollah-affiliated financial facilitator Adnan Ayad, as well as members of an international network of facilitators and companies connected to him and to Adel Diab - Dyad's business partner. Dyad - a fellow Hezbollah financier who was also added by the OFAC to the Specially Designated Nationals (SDN) list.

In August 2025 it was reported that the US deployed three Aegis-guided missile destroyers, along with P‑8 reconnaissance aircraft and at least one attack submarine, near Venezuela in order to fight the drug cartels and smuggling.

On 23 September 2025 it was reported that the US offer a reward of $10 million to whoever provides information about the financial networks of Hezbollah. This comes as another step to interfere with the organization funding.

== Money laundering ==
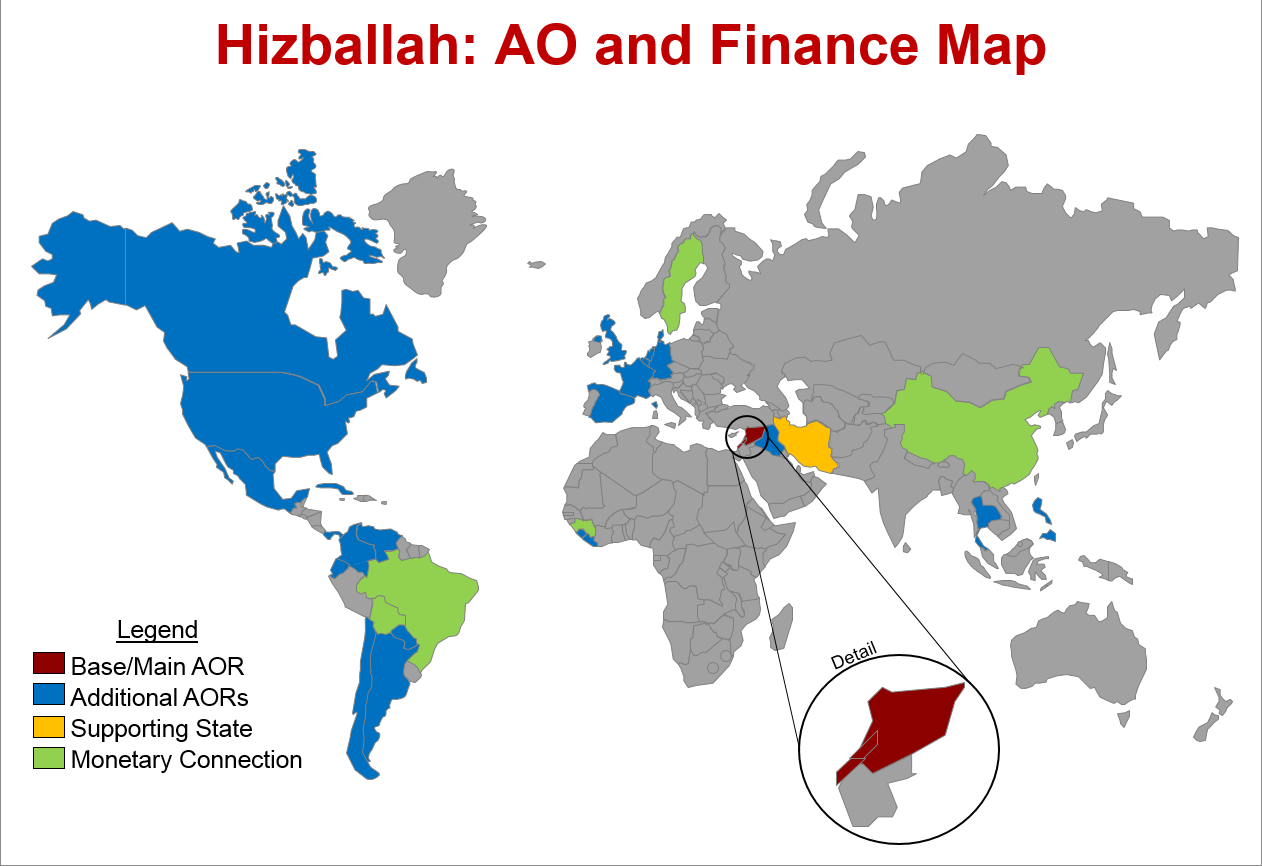
Countries where Hezbollah operates or has financing connections.

Hezbollah has been accused of engaging in various illegal activities for the purpose of securing funds for its own activities. For example, Matthew Levitt told a committee of the US Senate that Hezbollah engages in a "wide variety of criminal enterprises" worldwide in order to raise funds. The U.S. Treasury Department has accused Hezbollah of raising funds by counterfeiting U.S. currency. In 2008, the United States Drug Enforcement Administration launched Project Cassandra to track and undercut fundraising via illicit drugs.

Hezbollah has categorically denied all allegations of drug trafficking, illegal banking and money laundering. In a statement in 2011, the party said "The United States' allegations that Hezbollah is funding its activities illegitimately is merely another attempt to tarnish the image of the resistance in Lebanon ... after the failure and exposure of U.S. intelligence operations in our country".

In a 2012 speech, Secretary General Hassan Nasrallah said "Time and again they speak about the drug networks in Latin America and Europe and they say Hezbollah is financing these activities. This is forbidden for us." Al-Akhbar Newspaper argued that there is no evidence supporting the claim of Hezbollah's drug trafficking because no court have been provided evidence for that claim.

In October 2023, Dutch media outlet RTL Nieuws reported findings from the Israeli crypto analytics firm BitOK, which estimated that Hezbollah had received approximately US$3.7 million in cryptocurrency between mid-2021 and October 2023. The same investigation attributed around $41 million in crypto to Hamas and nearly $98 million to Palestinian Islamic Jihad during the same period.

=== Asia and Middle East ===
In the Golden Triangle region of South-East Asia, Hezbollah generates funding with the heroin trade and reportedly the smuggling of rare or precious items or materials. Mohammed Raad, at one time leader of Loyalty to the Resistance Bloc, said money from Iran came only through private charities to be used for health care, education and the support of war widows. Hezbollah's main sources of income, he said, are the party's investment portfolios and wealthy Shiites.

==== Lebanon ====
In July 2014, The Daily Beast reported that Hezbollah owns marijuana plantations and produces Hashish in the Bekaa Valley, in eastern Lebanon, and exports the produce to countries such as Iraq, Jordan and Syria. Prior to the Syrian civil war, the Lebanese Army patrolled the fields, though the Lebanese government has since adopted a laissez-faire attitude towards illegal drug production. According to Arab media reports, Hezbollah has a number of Lebanese front companies that deal in counterfeit medicine.

Hezbollah is known to be involved in the Cocaine trade, and the Hashish trade. Hezbollah uses the drug trade as well as other "criminal enterprises" to fund its military excursions in Lebanon, while some of their funds go to education and health assistance for the poor.

In September 2020, the U.S. Department of the Treasury's Office of Foreign Assets Control (OFAC) sanctioned two Lebanese ministers Ali Hassan Khalil and Yusuf Finyanus, due to their "material support to Hezbollah" and other corruption charges. It also sanctioned Lebanon-based Arch Consulting and Meamar Construction for being owned, controlled, or directed by Hezbollah, in addition to Hezbollah Executive Council official Sultan Khalifah Asaad.

According to a recent report from March 2026 analyzing Hezbollah's funding sources, since it entered the war with Israel in 2023, it is suffering from a deep financial crisis. This is due to its weakened military's strength, that affects its funding networks and disrupted its smuggling routes and regional support. The fall of the Assad regime and damage to revenues from Captagon trade have reduced its resources, leaving the group struggling. This forced Hezbollah to turn to alternative methods such as illegal online gambling. These platforms provide income and sophisticated means of money laundering, enabling money from unclear sources to be cycled as legitimate winnings. As a result, online gambling has become a central part of Hezbollah's emerging financial strategy in response to mounting economic strain.

Israel's efforts against Hezbollah have focused on its military assets as well as its finances, with an emphasis on the estimated US$700 million directed from Iran each year through intermediaries that accounted for most of Hezbollah's annual operating budget. Some of the earliest Israeli military efforts during the 2026 Lebanon war in March 2026 targeted the organization's supply of gold and foreign currency, as well as branches of the Al-Qard Al-Hasan Association, a non-profit financial institution that has been described as being "Hezbollah's bank in Lebanon". Money changing offices and gas stations were also struck, all as part of an effort to squeeze the organization's sources of funding. To bypass constraints set limiting the access of Al-Qard Al-Hasan to the formal banking network, the hawala system had been used to send US$1 billion in Iranian funds in 2025 via a network of broker transfers that passed through Iraq, Turkey and the United Arab Emirates, though sanctions have been placed on these brokers by the United States Department of the Treasury.

=== Europe ===
On January 9, 2010, Der Spiegel reported that drug dealers, on behalf of Hezbollah, transfer millions to Lebanese groups via European narcotics transactions.

In November 2018, following an investigation by the U.S. Drug Enforcement Administration (DEA) called “Operation Cedar”, Lebanese nationals, accused of having links to Hezbollah went on trial for laundering millions of euros in South American drug money to Europe and Lebanon. According to a research conducted by the Abba Eban Institute as part of an Initiative called Janus, some of the individuals arrested in “Operation Cedar” were Hezbollah operatives involved in money laundering and narcotics trafficking. The research also found that Hezbollah is financed through non-profit organizations such as the “Orphans Project Lebanon”, a German-based charity for Lebanese orphans. It found that it had been donating portions of its contributions to a foundation which finances the families of Hezbollah members who commit suicide bombings.

The European Foundation for Democracy published that the “Orphans Project Lebanon” organization directly channels financial donations from Germany to the Lebanese Al-Shahid Association, which is part of the Hezbollah network and promotes suicide bombings in Lebanon, particularly among children. In Germany, financial donations to the Orphans Project Lebanon are tax-deductible and thus subsidized by the German State's tax policy.

The largest seizure of cocaine in Irish history, 2.2 tons, took place in September 2023 when authorities conducted a military operation on a cargo trawler that ran aground in Irish waters. In July 2025, Irish courts sentenced two Iranian nationals involved in the incident whom police determined to be affiliated with Hezbollah, which had organized the shipment from Venezuela in coordination with the Kinahan cartel.

=== Latin America ===
==== Colombia ====
On October 21, 2008, the Los Angeles Times reported that an international cocaine smuggling and money laundering ring with alleged connections to Hezbollah was dismantled in Colombia. It is claimed that 12% of the group's profits went to fund Hezbollah, although no dollar figure was specified. A separate report claimed that the joint operations between the United States and Colombia resulted in the arrest of nearly 130 individuals suspected of being members of a cell formed from an alliance among a famous Colombian drug syndicate known as "North Valley", an armed leftist militant organisation composed by former and current members of FARC, and a group of smugglers of Lebanese origin.

Two years before, the United States and Colombia had launched a joint investigation, known by the operational codename "Titan", with the goal of pursuing networks that smuggled drugs from Colombia to the US, Europe and the Middle East. The investigation soon centred on the leader of the "North Valley" group, an individual of Lebanese origin called "Shukri Harb." Harb's network supplied 12 per cent of its revenues in cash directly to Hezbollah.

A June 25, 2009 article published by the Jamestown Foundation, a Washington, D.C. think tank, reported on the allegations connecting Hezbollah to drug trafficking and money laundering incidents in Curaçao in April 2009 and previous incidents linking Hezbollah to cocaine and money laundering rings dismantled in Colombia and 2008 and a similar ring dismantled in June 2005. The article takes a critical approach to these allegations by questioning the veracity of accusations linking Hezbollah to the drug trade in the Americas. The article also reported that Lebanese organized crime groups are likely to be responsible for drug-related activities in the region and that solid evidence proving the Hezbollah angle to drug-related activities never emerges.

==== Mexico ====
Other sources of Hezbollah funding became evident during a review of the Lebanese-Mexican smuggling network that smuggled 200 illegal Lebanese immigrants in the United States of America. Specifically, after Mahmoud Youssef Kourani, a Lebanese who infiltrated into the United States through the Lebanese-Mexican smuggling network was captured, Mahmound Youssef Kourani admitted spending part of his time in the United States raising money to support Hezbollah—at least $40,000, according to an FBI affidavit. A further check of court records indicated that Kourani told the FBI his brother is the group's (Hezbollah) chief of military security in southern Lebanon.

==== Venezuela ====
Members of the Bolivarian Venezuelan government have also been accused of providing financial aid to Hezbollah by the United States Department of the Treasury and according to the testimony of a former Assistant Secretary of State for Western Hemisphere Affairs of the United States Department of State Roger Noriega, Hugo Chávez's government gave "indispensable support" to Iran and Hezbollah in the Western Hemisphere. In an article by the conservative think tank American Enterprise Institute, Noriega explained how two witnesses alleged that Ghazi Atef Nassereddine, a Venezuelan diplomat in Syria, was an operative of Hezbollah who used Venezuelan entities to launder money for Hezbollah with President Nicolas Maduro's personal approval.

In a study by the Center for a Secure Free Society (SFS), at least 173 people from the Middle East were caught with Venezuelan documentation. The majority passed through Caracas security improperly and traveled to Canada. The SFS states that the Venezuelan government has been instrumental in providing documents to "Iran and other extremists seeking to enter North America without being detected. According to Joseph Humire, Executive Director of SFS, those caught were from "Iran, Iraq, Syria, Jordan and Lebanon" and that "most were from Iran, Lebanon and Syria. 70% came from those countries and had some connection with Hezbollah".

The majority allegedly had Venezuelan passports, IDs, visas and in some cases, even Venezuelan birth certificates. Anthony Daquin, former security advisor involved in the modernization of the Venezuelan identity system stated in the report that the Venezuelan government will "be able to issue the Venezuelan document without any problem, from the University of Computer Sciences, because they have the equipment and supplies, including polycarbonate sheets, electronic signature that goes into passports and encryption certificates, which are those that allow the chip to be read at the airports".

One of the key figures of the Venezuelan government noted in the SFS report was the Lebanese born former Minister of the Interior, Tarek El Aissami, who allegedly "developed a sophisticated financial network and multi-level networks as a criminal-terrorist pipeline to bring Islamic militants to Venezuela and neighboring countries, and to send illicit funds from Latin America to the Middle East". The "pipeline" consists of 40 shell companies which have bank accounts in Venezuela, Panama, Curaçao, St. Lucia, Miami and Lebanon. Tarek El Aissami's father Zaidan El Amin El Aissami, who is also known as Carlos Zaidan, was a military associate of Saddam Hussein.

The capture of Nicolás Maduro in early 2026 will make it much harder for Hezbollah to continue its activities in Venezuela. The organization has used official government support such as, documents, safe travel, and financial help through Venezuelan institutions, as well as partly illegal criminal networks to raise funds. With Maduro gone, these support systems could break down, government assets could be taken, and local criminal partners might fall apart. This would sharply reduce both legal and illegal income.

=== North America ===
In 2011, the United States Treasury designated Lebanese Canadian Bank a "primary money laundering concern" for its role in money laundering for Hezbollah funder and drug kingpin Ayman Joumaa. The US Treasury banned LCB from dealing in dollars, resulting in the sale of the bank.

Operation Smokescreen identified an illegal multimillion-dollar cigarette smuggling fundraising operation in the United States. Mohammed Hammoud was convicted in the United States for "violating a ban on material support of groups designated as terrorist organizations". The amount was US$3,500, which Hammoud claimed was to "support Hezbollah's efforts to distribute books at schools and improve public water systems."

=== Africa ===
Hezbollah created a financial network in Africa, mainly in Western and Central Africa. This network operates in addition to the funding it receives from Iran. The group is made up of the Shiite Lebanese diaspora in West Africa and are involved in several activities.

==== "Donations" ====
Hezbollah gets money from businesses owned by Lebanese people in countries like Côte d'Ivoire, Guinea, Sierra Leone, Senegal, Gambia, and the Democratic Republic of Congo. Business owners are often asked to give money once or twice a year. Sometimes they give it willingly, but other times they are forced to pay. The money is usually collected in cash and taken to Lebanon by people carrying it.

==== Money laundering and smuggling ====
Hezbollah is deeply involved in money laundering. It uses both legal businesses—like food companies, phone services, and real estate—and illegal activities, such as smuggling and avoiding taxes. People like Kassim Tajideen and his family have sent millions of dollars from Africa to Hezbollah. This has led the U.S. to punish them with sanctions and legal action.

==== Drug trafficking and the "Crime-Terror Nexus" ====
West Africa is an important stop for drug trafficking, especially for cocaine coming from South America. Hezbollah members like Ayman Joumaa have cleaned hundreds of millions of dollars made from drug sales by using businesses in Africa. The money is then sent to Hezbollah in Lebanon. They often work with drug cartels from South America, using West Africa to move drugs and hide the money.

==== Illegal Diamond Trade ====
In places like the Democratic Republic of Congo, traders connected to Hezbollah take part in the illegal diamond trade. The money they make from this is sent back to Lebanon, giving Hezbollah a steady flow of income that is hard to track.

==== Charity ====
Hezbollah also gets money through charities, which often hide their real purpose. In Nigeria, for example, the Al-Qard Al-Hassan Association has been used to collect money for Hezbollah, pretending it's to help the Lebanese community. Recent reports as of October 2025, show that in Lebanon, groups tied to Hezbollah are using digital payment services like Whish Money and OMT to raise money.

They managed to take advantage of weak anti money laundering and anti terror rules, enabling donations even though some of these charities are under US sanctions. Hezbollah instructs people to send money to digital wallets owned by private individuals, not to official accounts, making it hard for sanctions checks to spot the payments.

== Military funding ==
=== Iran ===
Hezbollah has also received Iranian-supplied weaponry, including 11,500 missiles already in place in southern Lebanon. 3,000 Hezbollah militants have undergone training in Iran, which included guerrilla warfare, firing missiles and rocket artillery, operating unmanned drones, naval warfare, and conventional war operations.

Mahmoud Ali Suleiman, the Hezbollah operative captured in August 2006 by the IDF for his role in the kidnapping of two Israeli soldiers in a cross-border raid on July 12, admitted during his interrogation that he received weapons-training and religious instruction in Iran. He told his interrogators that he rode in a civilian car to Damascus, from where he flew to Iran. Other than the Russian-made Katyusha, Hezbollah's reported artillery cache is entirely Iranian-made.

On August 4, 2006, Jane's Defence Weekly, a defense industry magazine, reported that Hezbollah asked Iran for "a constant supply of weapons to support its operations against Israel" in the 2006 Israel-Lebanon conflict. The report cited Western diplomatic sources as saying that Iranian authorities promised Hezbollah a steady supply of weapons "for the next stage of the confrontation".

Iran long denied supplying Hezbollah with weapons, despite persistent reports to the contrary. However, "Mohtashami Pur, a one-time ambassador to Lebanon who currently holds the title of secretary-general of the 'Intifada conference,' told an Iranian newspaper that Iran transferred the missiles to the Shi'ite militia, adding that Hezbollah has his country's blessing to use the weapons in defense of Lebanon". The Israel Defense Forces regard Hezbollah as virtually an arm of the Iranian armed forces; a senior Israeli defence official told Jane's Defence Weekly that "we should consider that what we are facing in Lebanon is not a militia but rather a special forces brigade of the Iranian Army." In an interview in 2007, Hezbollah Deputy Secretary-General Naim Qassem told the Iranian Arabic-language TV station al-Qawthar that all suicide bombings and other operations in Lebanon must be approved by the ayatollahs in Tehran; in 2008 Iran issued a stamp commemorating a recently killed Hezbollah leader.

In a 2016 speech, Nasrallah publicly announced for the first time that all of his organization's funding comes directly from Iran, “The budget of Hizbullah, its salaries, its expenses, its food, its drink, its weapons, and its missiles come from the Islamic Republic of Iran.” Nasrallah added that the funding is directly transferred to the group, not through banks and other financial institutions, “As long as Iran has money, we have money… Just as we receive the rockets that we use to threaten Israel, we are receiving our money.”

As of 2018, annual Iranian monetary support for Hezbollah is estimated at 700 million dollars according to US estimates.

According to Asharq Al-Awsat, as of 2024, Iran has begun to ship weapons by sea in lieu of attacks by the Israeli air force on weapons deliveries coming into northern Syria via Iraq. Weapons and other goods are now shipped to the Syrian port of Latakia, and from there are sent to southern Lebanon. Iran is reportedly utilizing ships that eventually dock at European ports as cover for the shipments.

In November 2025, it was reported that The U.S. Treasury sanctioned three individuals (Ossama Jaber, Ja’far Muhammad Qasir, and Samer Kasbar) who are linked to Hezbollah, for trafficking millions from Iran through Lebanon's cash based economy in 2025. These sanctions freeze their US assets and block American dealings with them.

=== Ba'athist Syria ===
Similar claims and denials regarding supply of weapons have been made with respect to Ba'athist Syria. Many have accused the Assad regime of funneling the weapons to Hezbollah from its border with Lebanon. Hassan Khalil, a top political adviser to Nasrallah, said that the group "firmly opposes the supervision of the Syrian-Lebanese border," adding that "Hezbollah has enough weapons to defend Lebanon against [an] Israeli aggression, even if borders with Syria are completely closed".

=== Iraq ===
Due to a modification of terrorist funding laws the U.S. government placed financial sanctions on an Iraqi military leader named Al-Zaydi who allegedly was linked to Hezbollah financial activities and military support which was coordinated by Iran.

=== Qatar ===
A private security contractor, Jason G., claimed that Qatar sponsored Hezbollah as early as 2017, in which he was offered €750,000 by Abdulrahman bin Mohammed Sulaiman al-Khulaifi, Qatar's ambassador to Belgium, to hush up the supply of money and weapons to the organization.

In September 2021, the Department of the Treasury's Office of Foreign Assets Control (OFAC) and the government of Qatar conducted a joint operation to uncover and sanction a financing network used by Hezbollah, a designated foreign terrorist organization based in Arabian Peninsula. According to the United States, Hezbollah abused the international financial system and announced that the U.S. will protect the international financial systems from terrorist abuse and cooperate with their partners like Qatar.

== See also ==
- Hezbollah Captagon smuggling to Saudi Arabia
- Illegal drug trade in Lebanon
