= Smokescreen =

Smokescreen or smoke screen may refer to:

- Palais Royale (film), a 1988 Canadian film released under the alternative titles Smokescreen or Smoke Screen
- Security smoke, generated smoke specifically used as a security measure
- Smoke screen, smoke released as a military countermeasure to hide weapons, other equipment, or infantry
- Smokescreen (film), a 1964 British film
- Smokescreen (Transformers), the name of several different characters in the Transformers robot superhero franchise
- "Smoke Screen", a song by Laura Branigan from Laura Branigan

== See also ==
- Operation Smokescreen, a US interagency counterterrorist operation from 1995 to 2002 to disrupt fundraising by Hezbollah
- "The Smoke Screen" (Yes, Prime Minister), a 1986 episode of Yes, Prime Minister
- Fog display, an imaging technique
