= Tiburon =

Tiburon (Spanish Tiburón, "shark") may refer to:

== Places ==
=== United States ===
- Tiburón Golf Club, in Naples, Florida
- Tiburon Peninsula (California), a peninsula in the San Francisco Bay Area of California

- Tiburon, California, a town on the peninsula

- EA Tiburon, an Electronic Arts studio in Orlando, Florida; developer of the Madden NFL series of video games

=== Mexico ===
- Tiburón Island, an island in the Gulf of California

=== Haiti ===
- Tiburon Peninsula, Haiti, the peninsula making up the southern half of Haiti

- Tiburon, Sud, a commune on the peninsula

=== Denmark ===
- Thyborøn, a fishing village on the west coast of Jutland

=== Fictional places ===
- A planet and a city in the Star Trek series
- A fictional town in South Carolina in The Secret Life of Bees (novel)
- A fictional town based on Canowindra, NSW described by Kylie Tennant in her eponymous first novel.

== Arts ==
- Tiburon, a 1935 prize winning first novel about the people of the eponymous town by Kylie Tennant
- El Tiburón, a single by Proyecto Uno. Also covered by Henry Mendez
- El Tiburón (film), a 2024 Dominican film directed by Félix Germán
- "Tiburón" (Rubén Blades song), by Willie Colón and Rubén Blades
- "Tiburones", a song recorded by Ricky Martin
- The Sharks (Spanish: Los Tiburones), a 2019 coming-of-age drama film written and directed by Lucia Garibaldi

== Sports ==
- Tiburones de Aguadilla
- Tiburones de Cancún
- Tiburones de La Guaira
- Tiburones de Mazatlán
- Tiburones de Sonsonate
- "El Tiburón", a nickname given to Spanish footballer Carles Puyol

== Vehicles ==
- Hyundai Tiburon, a car built by the Hyundai Motor Company
- Hoyt Tiburon, a take-down recurve bow built by Hoyt Archery
- USS Tiburon (SS-529)
- ROV Tiburon, a deep-sea research robot of the R/V Western Flyer

== Others ==
- A fictional character in the game Assassin's Creed IV: Black Flag
- A gunship in the game Star Citizen
- Ferran Torres, a Spanish football player who plays for FC Barcelona
- Operation Tiburon, a 1982 counterdrug operation
- USS Tiburon NCC-74220, Star Trek Fan organization in Denver, Colorado, U.S.

== See also ==
- Tibouren, French wine grape often misspelled as Tiburon
- Tiburonia, a genus of jellyfish in the family Ulmaridae
