= DEA Office of National Security Intelligence =

Division of the U.S. Drug Enforcement Administration

Office of National Security Intelligence
- Drug Enforcement Administration's seal

Office overview
- Formed: 1973
- Jurisdiction: United States
- Employees: 680 analysts
- Office executive: Paul E. Knierim, DEA Assistant Administrator for Intelligence
- Parent Office: Drug Enforcement Administration
- Website: Official website

The Office of National Security Intelligence of the United States Drug Enforcement Administration (DEA), established in 1973, helps initiate new investigations of major drug organizations, strengthens ongoing ones and subsequent prosecutions, develops information that leads to seizures and arrests, and provides policy makers with illegal drug trade trend information upon which programmatic decisions can be based. Additionally, the intelligence program has been one of the federal organizations that make up the United States Intelligence Community since 2006.

It employs over 680 intelligence analysts (I/As) and is led by the DEA Assistant Administrator for Intelligence.

== Functions ==
The specific functions of the DEA's intelligence mission are:

- Collect and produce intelligence in support of the DEA Administrator and other federal, state, and local agencies;
- Establish and maintain close working relationships with all agencies that produce or use narcotics intelligence;
- Increase the efficiency in the reporting, analysis, storage, retrieval, and exchange of such information; and, undertake a continuing review of the narcotics intelligence effort to identify and correct deficiencies.

== See also ==
- El Paso Intelligence Center
- Organized Crime Drug Enforcement Task Force
- War on drugs
