= Kamchatka Krai Police =

Law enforcement agency in Kamchatka, Russia

The Main Directorate for Internal Affairs of Kamchatka (Russian: Главного управления Министерства внутренних дел Российской Федерации по Камчатский край) or the Police of Kamchatka (Russian: Полиция Камчатки) is the main law enforcement agency in Government of Kamchatka Krai in Far East Russia. The central Headquarters is in Petropavlovsk-Kamchatsky.

== History ==
=== Czarist Russia ===
The Police was formed on May 24, 1902, as Constables Corps of Petropavel County. On June 17, 1909, The Kamchatka Oblast was established and Governor Perfilev formed the local branch of the Ministry for Internal Affairs. In 1913, the police force was formed as a new Gendarmerie. Between March and October 1917, the Politsiya departments were dissolved.

=== Soviet Russia ===
On May 26, 1917, The Militsiya Force of Kamchatka Oblast was formed, and Zavoikinsky and Zakrzhevsky were appointed as new commanders.

On April 29, 1918, the Militsiya become official. On April 1, 1926, the Miltsiya was divided into the next regional departments: Petropavel, Ust-Kamchatska, Bolshers, Karagin, Tigil, Penzhin, Anadyr and Chukotka Militsiya. On June 10, 1934, the Militsiya became a part of NKVD. In 1939 the Traffic police was established.

In 1946, The NKVD Directorate for Kamchatka Oblast was renamed as MVD Directorate for Kamchatka Oblast. During the Cold War, the police gained major structural changes, including the establishments of departments of forensics, economic crimes, investigation, and press.

=== Federal Russia ===
In January 1993, The Directorate for combating Organised Crimes (УБОП) has been established. On May 15 in same year was established The UNON Department (Anti Drugs Department, the processor of FSKN).

On June 1, 1993, the local special force was created as Kamchatka's OMON. On July 5, 1996, the Internal Affairs Departments for Cops Investigations was created to combat the growing corruption.

After the Federal Taxes Police was dissolved, on July 1, 2003, it was decided to create the local Directorate for Tax Crimes. The Police Aviation was formed on April 19, 2004.

In May 2011, the Militsiya was renamed and again it is carrying out the previous Czarist name, Politsiya.

== Structure ==
- Central Investigation Department
- Department of organization of the Spetsnaz
- Directorate for public order
- Zonal dog service center
- Department for records and mode
- Center for licenses and permits
- Department of inquiry
- Department for regional departments
- Office for Combating Economic Crimes
- Directorate for private security
- Office of the Traffic Police (GAI)
- The Personnel Office
- Department of Internal Security
- The Center for Combating offenses in the consumer market and the implementation of administrative law
- Forensic Center
- Audit Division
- Center for Information Technology, Communications and Information Protection (TsITSiZI)
