= Putin's Plan =

Political and economic program of Vladimir Putin

Putin's Plan (Russian: план Путина, romanized: Plan Putina) is an informal reference for a political and economic programme of Russian president Vladimir Putin. Neither Putin nor his team officially released any comprehensive programme.

Slogans supporting "Putin's Plan" were a staple of the election campaign of the United Russia in the 2007 parliamentary election and the 2008 presidential election.

Putin himself stated that the term is nothing but a pre-election slogan based on the excerpts from 7 years of his State of the Nation address to the Federal Assembly related to the long-term development of various spheres in the life of the country.

== Origin ==
The term "Putin's Plan" was introduced by the chairman of the Supreme Council of United Russia Boris Gryzlov. Conceptual framework of "Putin's Plan" was first revealed by Director General of APEC D. Orlov in May 2007.

== United Russia ==
In the electoral programme of the party "United Russia" in the parliamentary elections in 2007, "Putin's Plan" is stated as follows:

- further development of Russia as a unique civilization, protection of common cultural space, the Russian language, our historical traditions;
- improving the competitiveness of the economy through access to innovative development, support of science, infrastructure development, increasing investment primarily in high technology, the industry - the engines of economic growth;
- provide a new quality of life by continuing the implementation of priority national projects, and further substantial increase in wages, pensions and scholarships to help citizens in solving the housing problem;
- support of civil society, promote social mobility and activity, promotion of community initiatives;
- strengthening the sovereignty of Russia, the country's defense, the provision for its proper place in a multipolar world.

== In popular culture ==
Almost immediately the expression was reinterpreted based on the Russian slang meaning of the term "план" for "marijuana", i.e., reading it as "Putin's Weed". A little-known band "Корейские LЁDчики" from Vladivostok gained in its popularity with the songs Putin and Putin's "Plan").

The Moscow section of the Union of Right Forces sent a written request to Federal Drug Control Service of Russia to check whether "Putin's Plan" is a narcotic or psychotropic substance and carried out a rally against legalisation of controlled substances during which they gave out badges with various pun texts, such as "Putin's High Rating is Due to Putin's Plan."
