= Project Cassandra =

Stymied DEA-led effort to undercut Hezbollah funding from illicit drug sources

Project Cassandra was a U.S. Drug Enforcement Administration (DEA) initiative launched in 2008 to disrupt Hezbollah's funding networks by targeting its involvement in international drug trafficking and money laundering. Focused on tracking hundreds of millions of dollars flowing from North and South America through Europe and West Africa to Lebanon, the effort aimed to expose and block financial channels supporting the group's activities. While the operation uncovered significant links between Hezbollah and organized crime, its later years were marked by controversy over allegations that enforcement efforts were slowed to protect nuclear negotiations with Iran—a claim disputed by former officials.

== The project ==
Project Cassandra was an overall effort led by the United States Drug Enforcement Administration (DEA) to undercut Hezbollah funding from illicit drug sources in South America. The effort had two other investigations running simultaneously: Project Cedar and Project Titan. Launched in 2008, Project Cassandra was investigating the terrorist organization's funding. The DEA, Eurojust, and Europol found that Hezbollah was increasingly involved with drug trafficking and organized crime as a method of funding its activities.

Hezbollah's ties to Venezuela are part of its wider presence in Latin America. Reports say it has worked with criminal groups and some political figures there to launder money, traffic drugs, and move people and goods. This support helps Hezbollah raise money and operate beyond the Middle East, which some US officials see as a security risk. The investigation was tracking how hundreds of millions of dollars were being laundered from North America through Europe and West Africa to Lebanon and into Hezbollah's coffers.

"Members of Hezbollah established business relationships with South American drug cartels responsible for supplying large quantities of cocaine to the European and United States drug markets. An intricate network of money couriers collect and transport millions of euros in drug proceeds from Europe to the Middle East. The currency is then paid in Colombia to drug traffickers using the Hawala disbursement system. A large portion of the drug proceeds is laundered through Lebanon [facilitated by the now-defunct Lebanese Canadian Bank and other Lebanese nationals], where it is then used for the benefit of Hezbollah to purchase weapons."

== Allegations and controversy ==
Josh Meyer's investigative report, published by Politico in December 2017, described how, during the Obama administration, concerns regarding the Iran nuclear deal took precedence over the DEA project. This led to the shutdown of Project Cassandra just as it was targeting senior Hezbollah figures, even though the group was still smuggling cocaine into the United States. Requests by the DEA team to secure support from the Departments of State, Justice, and Treasury for their investigation faced delays or rejections, and officials have publicly suggested that these obstacles were politically motivated, aiming to preserve ongoing negotiations over the nuclear agreement with Iran. In his report, Meyer cited former Obama administration Treasury official Katherine Bauer, who testified before the House Committee on Foreign Affairs in February 2017 that certain law enforcement efforts against Hezbollah had been constrained by policy decisions related to Iran. Former Obama administration officials denied blocking actions against Hezbollah for political reasons, citing ongoing sanctions and prosecutions. Critics argued key arrests came only after nuclear talks concluded and claimed earlier efforts were obstructed.

== Aftermath ==
In December 2017, during Trump's first administration, Attorney General Jeff Sessions ordered a review of prior cases, which was followed in January 2018 by the establishment of the Hezbollah Financing and Narcoterrorism Team (HFNT) at the Department of Justice. The team was tasked with reexamining investigations from the DEA's 2008–2017 efforts targeting Hezbollah's drug trafficking and financial networks, including cases stemming from Project Cassandra. However, this yielded only modest outcomes.

== See also ==
- 2026 United States intervention in Venezuela
- Iran nuclear deal framework
- Drug economy in Lebanon
- Foreign relations of Hezbollah
- Funding of Hezbollah
- Aly Fayad
- Iran–United States relations during the Obama administration
- Iranian external operations
- Operation Money Badger

== External references ==
- Hezbollah, l'enquête interdite
