= Cannabis in Lebanon =

- Location of Lebanon (dark green)
- Medicinal: Legal
- Recreational: Illegal
- Hemp: Legal

On 21 April 2020, the Parliament of Lebanon passed a law legalizing cannabis cultivation for medical use. Lebanon became the first Arab country to do so. Cultivation of non-psychoactive hemp was also made legal. The Bekaa Valley region is well-known for its cannabis production.

== Production ==
A 2021 VOA report about cannabis harvesting in the Bekaa Valley

The production of hashish was prohibited in Lebanon in 1926, during the era of the French Mandate for Syria and the Lebanon. However, the cannabis industry blossomed during the chaos of the 15-year Lebanese civil war (1975–1990). The cultivation of cannabis itself was forbidden in 1992, under pressure from the United States.

By 2001, poverty had pressed many farmers to return to growing cannabis. By 2002, production had reached 37,000 acres: double what it was the year prior. Later on, cannabis farms flourished during the Syrian civil war starting from 2011, as the government was more concerned about security issues.

== Legal status ==
In 2018, the Parliament speaker Nabih Berri stated, "The Lebanese Parliament is preparing to study and adopt the legislation necessary to legislate the cultivation of cannabis and its manufacture for medical uses in the manner of many European countries and some US states", as he told US Ambassador to Lebanon Elizabeth Richard according to Lebanon's official news agency. This announcement came after the release of a five-year study by McKinsey & Company to boost economic development. With the world's third highest debt, proponents for legalization argued that fostering the marijuana industry could help to reform the country's economy. Some growers that oppose the reform, such as Abu Jafaar of the Bekka Valley (Lebanon's most well-known growing area), feared that government intervention will take revenue away from them and into the hands of politicians.

On 21 April 2020, the Parliament passed a law legalizing cannabis cultivation for medical use. Lebanon became the first Arab country to do so. Cultivation of non-psychoactive hemp was also made legal. In 2025, Prime Minister Nawaf Salam stated that he had high hopes for the growing legal cannabis industry in Lebanon, predicting that it could generate over $1 billion in annual revenue and provide high-quality jobs in areas like the Bekaa Valley.

== See also ==
- Illegal drug trade in Lebanon
