= Operation Money Badger =

Secret DEA espionage operation

- Logo of the Drug Enforcement Administration.
- Date: 2013-?
- Location: Venezuela
- Type: Secret mission
- Participants: DEA

Operation Money Badger was a secret espionage operation carried out in Venezuela by the Drug Enforcement Administration (DEA) and United States prosecutors since 2013.

After the Federal Prosecutor's Office in Manhattan released a series of classified documents in an apparent accident, Associated Press (AP) published an investigative report with the news on February 1, 2024.

== History ==
The secret 15-page report made in 2018 was available on the internet for a few hours, until an AP journalist began asking questions and it was taken down. It revealed that an investigative operation had begun in 2013 and had intensified during the Trump administration. The memo was intended not to be made public in the future.

The report also reported that the United States had infiltrated DEA operatives in Venezuela under the order that "it is necessary to carry out this operation unilaterally and without notifying the Venezuelan authorities," recognizing that it could be a violation of international law.

The operation targeted dozens of people, including Nicolás Maduro and the Minister of Energy. Alex Saab was one of the spied on officials, as well as a fugitive Defense contractor. About a hundred people had been investigated by the United States.

As part of the operation, Group 10 of the DEA's Miami Field Division recruited as an informant a professional money launderer accused of stealing $800 million from Venezuela's foreign exchange system through a fraudulent import scheme.

The DEA collected information regarding the former governor of Táchira, José Vielma Mora, and Luis Motta Domínguez, who were later accused by the United States of money laundering linked to bribery.

== 2025-2026 US operations against Venezuela ==
Following year of targeting Maduro on the drug cartels and his drug related charges, based on the 2010s and 2020s, DEA secret spying operations, the US launched a widespread operation against Venezuela. Its highlight was the Capture of Nicolás Maduro.

== See also ==
- Project Cassandra
- Project Cedar (DEA)
- Project Titan (DEA)
- United States v. Maduro et al.
