= El Paso Intelligence Center =

Coordinates: 31°49′48.55″N 106°22′27.38″W

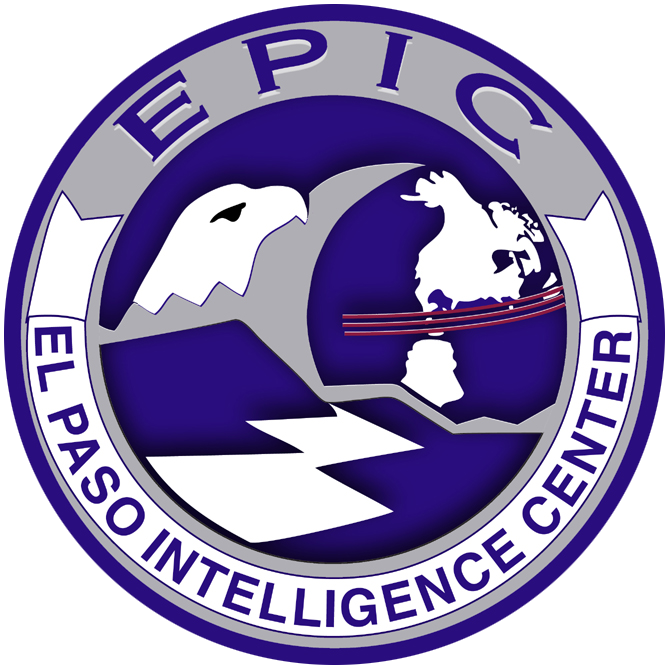

Agency overview
- Formed: 1974; 52 years ago

Jurisdictional structure
- Operations jurisdiction: United States

Operational structure
- Parent agency: Drug Enforcement Administration

The El Paso Intelligence Center (EPIC) was established in 1974 in response to a study by the Justice Management Division of the U.S. Department of Justice entitled, "A Secure Border."

== History ==
Recommendation number 7 of this study suggested the establishment of a southwest border intelligence center to be led by the Drug Enforcement Administration (DEA) and staffed by representatives of that agency, as well as the U.S. Customs Service. The initial focus of the center was to assist in the identification of drug traffickers and alien traffickers along the Mexico–United States border.

The current EPIC facility was dedicated on 22 February 1989 in memory of DEA special agent Enrique Camarena-Salazar who was slain in the line of duty while conducting an undercover operation in Mexico. Expanded in 1998–1999, EPIC headquarters lies within Biggs Army Airfield at Fort Bliss military reservation in El Paso, Texas, and is run jointly by the DEA and U.S. Customs and Border Protection (CBP), part of the Department of Homeland Security (DHS). In the pre-DHS era, the three main federal agencies at EPIC were DEA, the Immigration and Naturalization Service (INS) and the U.S. Customs Service.

EPIC is now staffed with over 300 personnel and liaison officers from 15 agencies.
