= Operation Tiburon =

Counterdrug operation

- Part of War on drugs
Date	November 1980 – February 5, 1982
Location	Colombia
Result	Temporary disruption of marijuana trafficking: Over 400 traffickers arrested; More than 90 vessels seized; 6.4 million pounds of marijuana confiscated

Belligerents
United States: U.S. Coast Guard; United States Customs Service; Drug Enforcement Administration; Colombia: Colombian Armed Forces; Colombian National Police	Marijuana traffickers; Drug cartels

Commanders and leaders
(United States) William French Smith	Unknown

Operation Tiburon, (Tiburon (es:Tiburón) is Spanish for "Shark,") was a coordinated counterdrug operation between three different U.S. agencies – Drug Enforcement Administration (DEA), U.S. Coast Guard, U.S. Customs Service – and Colombian authorities, resulting in the seizure of approximately 6.4 million pounds of marijuana coming from Colombia, about 20% of the total amount that enters the United States annually. Of the total, 4.7 million were confiscated by the Colombian government while the remaining 1.7 million were seized by U.S. personnel. The operation concluded on February 5, 1982, when U.S. Attorney General William French Smith announced "the most successful international marijuana interdiction effort to date" at Coast Guard headquarters. Along with the pot seized, 495 people were arrested and 95 vessels were seized.

Conducted in a 14-month-long period involving three raids, the operation is considered to be the most successful counterdrug operation to date, with record seizures as of 1982. The Attorney General commended the operation as a "classic example" of how successful collaboration between different agencies and governments is key to tackling large-scale drug trafficking operations.
