= Main Directorate for Drugs Control =

Russian federal government agency

Main Directorate for Drugs Control Главное управление по контролю за оборотом наркотиков
- Emblem of the Main Directorate for Drugs Control
- Abbreviation: GUKON (ГУКОН)

Agency overview
- Formed: 5 April 2016; 10 years ago
- Preceding agency: Federal Drug Control Service

Jurisdictional structure
- National agency (Operations jurisdiction): Russia
- Federal agency (Operations jurisdiction): Russia
- Operations jurisdiction: Russia
- GUKON jurisdiction
- Area: 17,098,242 square miles (44,284,240 km^{2})
- Population: 143,441,534 (2016 est.)
- Legal jurisdiction: Russian Federation; Russian foreign drug-related investigations
- Governing body: Ministry of Internal Affairs
- General nature: Federal law enforcement; Civilian police

Operational structure
- Overseen by: Government of Russia
- Headquarters: 19 Azovskaya, Moscow, Russia
- Director responsible: Vladimir Kolokoltsev, Interior Minister
- Agency executive: Ivan Gorbunov, Director
- Parent agency: Ministry of Internal Affairs
- Child agency: Grom Special Unit

Website
- mvd.ru/gunk

The Main Directorate for Drugs Control (Note: The official name is the Main Directorate for Drugs Control of the Ministry of Internal Affairs of the Russian Federation Russian: Главное управление по контролю за оборотом наркотиков Министерства внутренних дел Российской Федерации) (GUKON, Russian: Главное управление по контролю за оборотом наркотиков (ГУКОН), romanized: Glavnoe upravlenie po kontrolyu za oborotom narkotikov (GUKON)) is a law enforcement agency of the Ministry of Internal Affairs of Russia responsible for the regulation of narcotics and investigation of drug crimes.

Drugs Control is tasked with combating drug smuggling and illegal drug use within the Russian Federation. It is the lead agency for domestic enforcement of the Controlled Substances Act, sharing concurrent jurisdiction with the Federal Security Service, and also has sole responsibility for coordinating and pursuing Russian drug investigations abroad.

Drugs Control was established by presidential decree on 4 April 2016 when the Federal Drug Control Service of Russia was dissolved and its functions were transferred to the Ministry of Internal Affairs. Kirill Smurov has been Acting Director of Drugs Control since 16 July 2021. Drugs Control is headquartered at Azovskaya 19 in Moscow.

== History ==
There were no specialized departments or police departments to combat drug trafficking on the territory of the Russian Empire, but these functions were carried out by the Police Department and the Medical Department of the Ministry of Internal Affairs of the Russian Empire. For a long time, there was no specialized department to combat drug trafficking in the Soviet Union due to insufficient awareness of the seriousness of the problem and, in part, ideological attitudes towards "the impossibility of drug addiction in Soviet society." This led to the fact that such a department appeared only in 1970, although law enforcement agencies had been dealing with this problem from the very beginning of the formation of the Soviet Union.

On 7 July 1973, an independent Department for Combating Drug Addiction of the Criminal Investigation Department of the USSR Ministry of Internal Affairs (Отдел по борьбе с наркоманией Управления уголовного розыска МВД СССР) was created. In 1989, the Drug Enforcement Department was reorganized into the 3rd Directorate for Combating Illicit Drug Trafficking and Crimes Associated with Foreign Citizens of the USSR Ministry of Internal Affairs. Two of the three divisions of the 3rd Directorate specialized in drug trafficking.

On 1990, at the expense of the staffing of the USSR Ministry of Internal Affairs, the Directorate for Combating the Spread of Drug Addiction of the USSR Ministry of Internal Affairs was created. In its structure, in addition to the two central ones, seven more interregional departments for combating drug trafficking are formed, subordinate directly to the USSR Ministry of Internal Affairs. After repeated renaming and organizational changes in the system and structure of the Ministry, by order of the USSR Ministry of Internal Affairs dated 28 November 1991, this special militsiya unit was removed from the jurisdiction of the Main Directorate of the Ministry of Internal Affairs of the USSR. Instead of the previous Directorate, the Bureau for the Control of Illicit Drug Trafficking of the USSR Ministry of Internal Affairs was formed, which became an independent branch service of the criminal police.

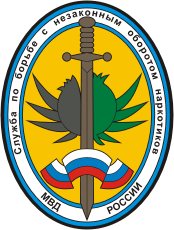
Emblem of Anti-Narcotics Department (UNON), 1992–2002

In early 1992, the Bureau for the Control of Illegal Drug Trafficking of the Ministry of Internal Affairs merged with the First Department of the Directorate for Combating Drug Addiction and Crimes against Foreign Citizens of the Criminal Investigation Department of the Ministry of Internal Affairs of the Russian Soviet Federative Socialist Republic, which dealt with the drug problem within Russia. On the basis of these two organizational structures, the Directorate for Illegal Drug Trafficking of the Ministry of Internal Affairs of Russia (UNON) is being formed. Over the years of its existence, UNON was the main body that counteracted the spread of drugs in Russia and the criminal prosecution of persons who sell drugs and involve new victims in drug addiction – in other words, the drug mafia. UNON performed many successful operations, with thousands of drug dealers being arrested and prosecuted. UNON existed for 12 years and during this period there was significant change in both the fight against drug trafficking and in Russian realities.

By the fall of 2002, the need for reforms of UNON was ripe with calls for a new structure, with broader powers, capable of more effectively countering the increase in the drug threat, including in the information sphere. In November 2002, the State Committee for Counteracting Illegal Trafficking in Narcotic Drugs and Psychotropic Substances (Gosnarkontrol) was established under the Ministry of Internal Affairs. But six months later, it became clear that the importance of the problem required the creation of an independent department. By the decree of the President of Russia Vladimir Putin, on 1 July 2003, the State Committee of the Russian Federation was established to control the circulation of narcotic drugs and psychotropic substances. Gosnarkontrol was involved in management in all areas, one way or another related to drugs, with their legal or illegal circulation. On 9 March 2004, the President of Russia signed Decree No. 314 "On the System and Structure of Federal Executive Bodies" in accordance with which the State Drug Control Service of Russia was renamed the Federal Service of the Russian Federation for the Control of Drug Trafficking (FSKN of Russia), which became one of the most powerful federal services in Russia. However, during its existence, the Federal Drug Control Service was met with strong criticism from the Federal Security Service and the Ministry of Internal Affairs for their poor efficiency, and a structural reform was again needed.

On 5 April 2016, President Putin signed Decree No. 156 abolishing the Federal Drug Control Service and transferring its functions to the Ministry of Internal Affairs of Russia. Since April 2016, the functions of the Federal Drug Control Service of Russia have been performed by the Main Directorate for Drug Control of the Ministry of Internal Affairs of the Russian Federation. On 13 April 2016, Lieutenant General of Police Andrei Ivanovich Khrapov was appointed Chief of the Main Directorate.

== Directors ==
Director	Years	President	Notes
Alexander Sergeyev	September 1992 – September 2002	Yeltsin, Putin	Director of the Directorate of the Drugs Law Enforcement (UNON)
See here	2003–2016	Putin, Medvedev	Director of the Federal Drug Control Service
Andrei Khrapov	5 April 2016 – 16 July 2021	Putin	First Director of the Main Directorate for Drugs Control (GUKON)
Kirill Smurov	16 July 2021 – 31 January 2022	Putin	Acting director
Ivan Gorbunov	31 January 2022 – present	Putin	Director of the Main Directorate for Drugs Control (GUKON)

== See also ==
- Service for Citizenship and Registration of Foreign Citizens
- Militsiya
- Police of Russia
