= Operation Smokescreen =

1995–2002 US anti-Hezbollah financing operation

Operation Smokescreen was an American interagency counterterrorist operation to disrupt fundraising by Hezbollah, that took place in early 1995, ending in 2002. The operation involved the Sheriff's Office in Iredell County, North Carolina, Federal Bureau of Investigation (FBI), Bureau of Alcohol, Tobacco, Firearms and Explosives (BATF), Immigration and Naturalization Service (INS), and the U.S. Department of State's Diplomatic Security Service (DSS).

Detective Sergeant Robert Fromme made repeated observations of a group of men purchasing large quantities of cigarettes, often with $20,000 - $30,000 in cash. The joint counterterrorism operation ended the fundraising operation, resulting in the arrest, trial, and conviction of the cell members. The operation led to the creation of the North Carolina Joint Terrorism Task Force (JTTF).

== Hezbollah operations ==
Hezbollah cell leader Mohamad Youssef Hammoud was denied a travel visa by the US embassy in Syria, after which he traveled to Venezuela. After purchasing a forged travel visa, arrived in New York City in 1992. By 1995, Hammoud set up operations in Charlotte, North Carolina, working at a local pizza restaurant. At least two additional members of the Hezbollah Charlotte cell entered the United States with false travel visas from Venezuela purchased for $200, and three had travel visas issued in Cyprus. Half the cell members were born in Lebanon, and the other half were US-born, of Lebanese descent. Early in the spring of 1995, Detective Robert Fromme, working a second job at the tobacco wholesaler JR Discount (in Statesville, North Carolina), observed the cell purchasing massive quantities of cigarettes, paying for them in cash. The cash was usually carried in large grocery bags, containing as much as $20,000 to $30,000 at a time.

== Surveillance ==
Detective Fromme continued to monitor the purchases for several months, and determined cell members were transporting the cigarette cartons across state lines, in violation of federal laws. Each of the four men Fromme was watching purchased 299 cartons of cigarettes, the legal limit permitted without filing legal paperwork. Cigarettes were moved from North Carolina to Tennessee and Virginia. Fromme notified John Lorick, of the Charlotte ATF. ATF officials informed Fromme that cigarette trafficking was likely an attempt to sell the merchandise for as much as twice the price in states such as Michigan, New York, and Pennsylvania - which had considerably higher taxes on tobacco. North Carolina's tax on cigarettes was five cents, whereas it was seventy-five cents in Michigan at the time. The Hezbollah cell was selling the cigarettes through "front store" operations, and to local convenience stores in Dearborn, Michigan, with a price difference between North Carolina and Michigan ranging from $8.00 - $10.00 per carton. Each 680-mile cigarette smuggling trip to Michigan carried between 800 and 1,500 cartons of cigarettes, worth between $3,000 and $10,000. Some cell members fraudulently secured a $1.6 million loan from the federal government's Small Business Administration, which funded the opening of a gas station.

The Iredell County Sheriff's Office signed a memorandum of understanding with the Charlotte ATF, permitting the formal collaboration between the two agencies. As a result, Detective Fromme was officially reassigned to the ATF. Additional federal agencies were assigned to the case, including the Diplomatic Security Service, and Immigration and Naturalization Service. The FBI, which had already been wiretapping communications of two of the cell members, apparently without the knowledge of local law enforcement, also participated in the joint operations. In all, sixteen law enforcement and intelligence services from state, local, and federal agencies contributed to the operation, including the Canadian Security Intelligence Service (CSIS). Surveillance was run from an empty storefront across from the JR Discount wholesaler building. The cell was secretly followed by a team of five vehicles, which took turns driving behind the cigarette smugglers. "As an extra precaution, the agents sometimes changed clothes and switched license plates during pit stops."

== Raid ==
The assembled joint task force penetrated the Hezbollah cell, developing more than ten informants from within the group, as well as from a pool of witnesses. Informants were gleaned from cell staff members, including drivers, smugglers, and even spouses. Simultaneous raids in North Carolina and Michigan at 6:00 a.m. on July 20, 2000 captured many cell members and accomplices. A total of 18 arrest warrants were executed. The arrest of Said Muhammad Harb provided invaluable insights into the structure of the Hezbollah cell, its members, and operations. In exchange for his cooperation, Harb received a lighter sentence, and his family was relocated from Lebanon to the United States. At least 230 local, state, and federal agents participated in the raids.

== Outcome ==
Hezbollah members from the Charlotte cell were arrested, tried, and convicted in a federal court in Charlotte, North Carolina. The case brought against the cell included "copyright violations, cigarette tax violations, counterfeit violations... bank scams, bribery, credit card fraud, immigration fraud, identity theft, tax evasion, and money laundering," and "material support to a terrorist organization." Federal courts estimate the cell collected a total of $8 million, funneled through some 500 different bank accounts. The Hezbollah cell also purchased and shipped "Night vision goggles and scopes, Surveying equipment, Global Positioning Systems, Metal detection equipment, Video equipment, Aircraft analysis & design software, Military compasses, Binoculars, Naval equipment, Ultrasonic dog repellers, Laser range finders, Digital cameras, zoom lenses, Computer equipment (laptops, high-speed modems; processors, joysticks, plotters, scanners, and printers), Stun guns, Handheld radios & receivers, Cellular telephones, Nitrogen cutters, Mining, drilling & blasting equipment" to the Middle East, for use by Hezbollah, mostly purchased by Harb. Mohamad Youssef Hammoud, the cell's leader, was sentenced to 155 years in federal prison. Hammoud's older brother, Shawqi Youssef, (a.k.a. "Bassem"), and "right-hand man" received a prison sentence of 70 years. Overall, 26 people were indicted in the operation. The Operation Smokescreen case is the first conviction for the violation of federal code 2339B, "Providing material support or resources to designated foreign terrorist organizations". Similar cases were later uncovered in Asheville, North Carolina, and Louisville, Kentucky.

== Sources ==
- Lightning Out of Lebanon: Hizballah Terrorists on American Soil, Tom Diaz and Barbara Newman, 2006.
- Federal and State Authorities in North Carolina Announce 'Operation Smokescreen', CNN Archived 2011-05-22 at the Wayback Machine, July 21, 2000.
- U.S. authorities bust cigarette-smuggling ring linked to Hezbollah, CNN, July 21, 2000.
- Hezbollah suspects arrested, BBC News, July 22, 2000.
- Blood Money: A Hezbollah Terrorist Cell in Charlotte, N.C., Reader's Digest Archived 2008-12-05 at the Wayback Machine, February 2004.
- "An Assessment of the Tools Needed to Fight the Financing of Terrorism.", Robert J. Conrad Jr., November 20, 2002.
- American Jihad: The Terrorists Living Among Us, Steven Emerson, 2002.
