= Federal Drug Control Service of Russia =

Federal Service for the Control of Narcotics Narco-Control Наркополиция
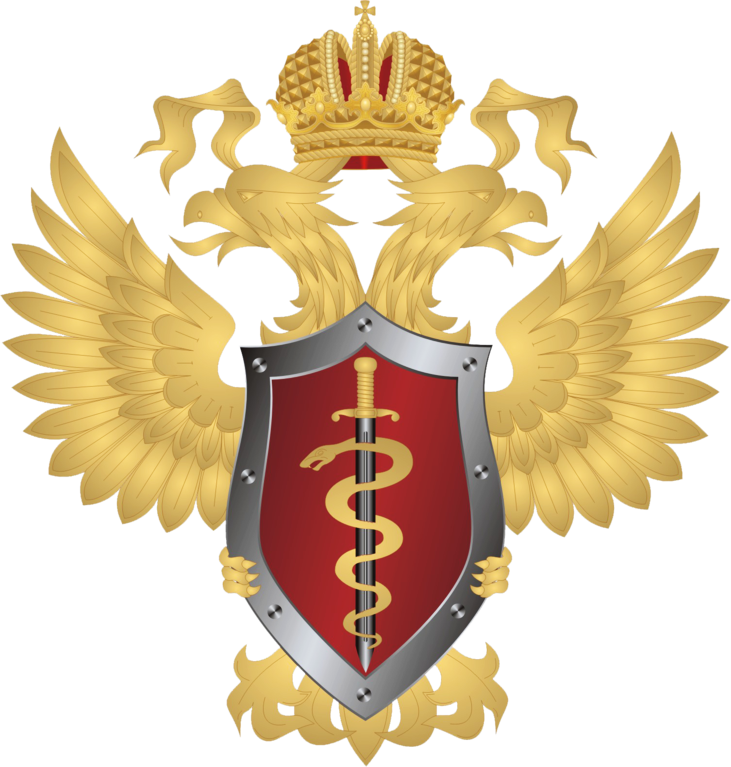
- Emblem

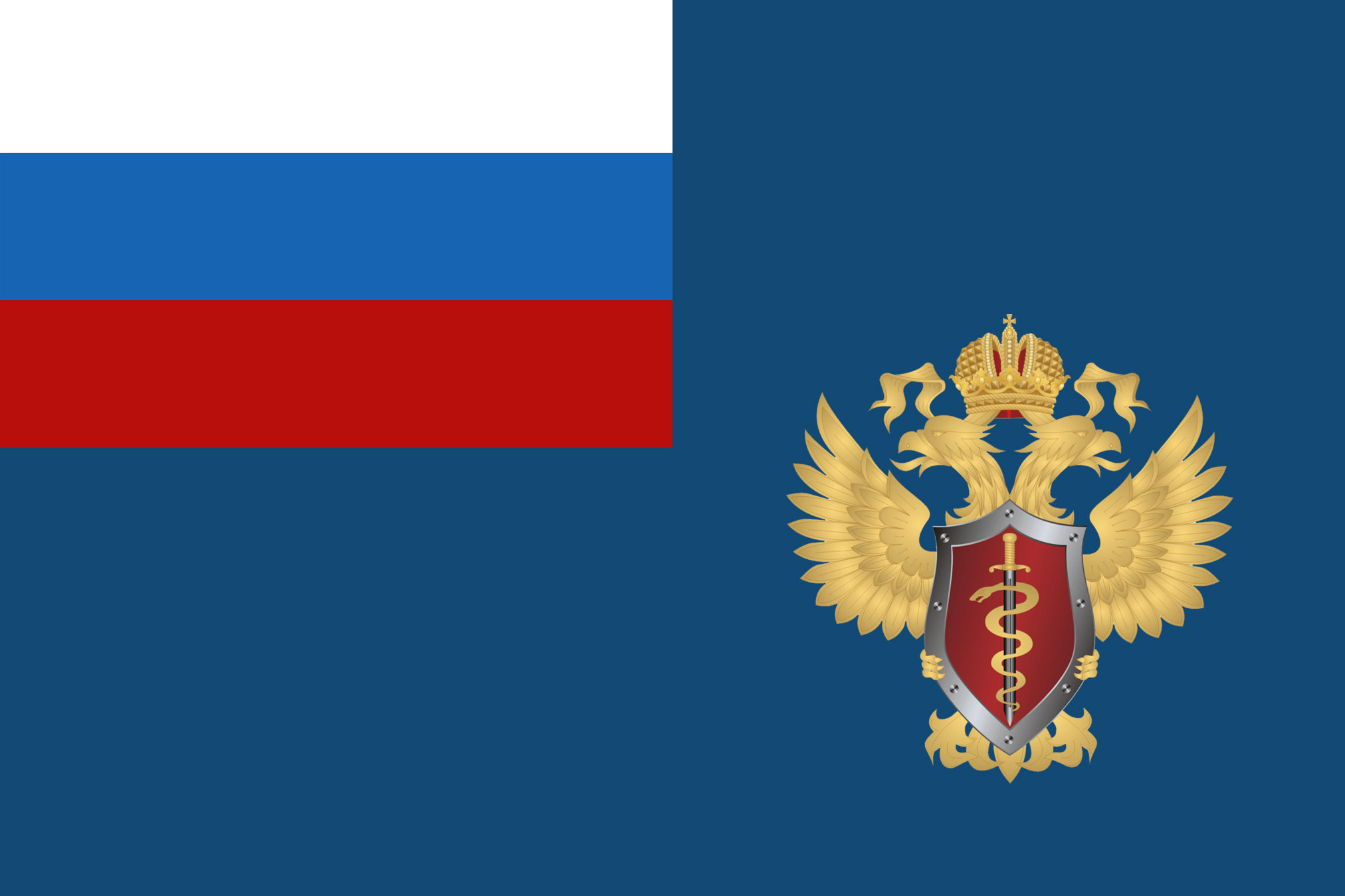
- Flag
- Abbreviation: FSKN

Agency overview
- Formed: 11 March 2003
- Preceding agencies: State Committee for the Control of the Circulation of Narcotic and Psychotropic Substances; UNON MVD – MVD's Anti-Drugs Department
- Dissolved: 31 May 2016 (Under a Presidential decree from 5 April 2016)
- Superseding agency: Main Directorate for Drugs Control
- Employees: ~40,000
- Annual budget: ₽24,737,452 RUB (2011) (US$810,794)

Jurisdictional structure
- Federal agency (Operations jurisdiction): RUS
- Operations jurisdiction: RUS
- Legal jurisdiction: Russian Federation; Russian foreign drug-related investigations
- Primary governing body: Presidential Administration of Russia
- Secondary governing body: State Anti-Narcotics Committee
- General nature: Federal law enforcement; Civilian police

Operational structure
- Headquarters: Moscow, Russia
- Elected officer responsible: Vladimir Putin, President
- Agency executives: Viktor Ivanov, last Director of the Federal Service for Drug Control; Vladimir Kalada, First Deputy Director (last)
- Parent agency: Presidential Administration of Russia
- Child agency: Grom Unit, Narcopolice Spetsnaz

Notables
- Anniversary: 11 March

Website
- http://www.fskn.gov.ru/

The Federal Drug Control Service of the Russian Federation or FSKN (Russian: Федеральная служба Российской Федерации по контролю за оборотом наркотиков, ФСКН России, romanized: Federal'naya sluzhba Rossiyskoy Federatsii po kontrolyu za oborotom narkotikov, FSKN Rossii) was a federal law enforcement agency of executive authority authorized to combat illicit drug trafficking. It was responsible for drafting state policy, legal regulation, control and monitoring in combating the trafficking of drugs, psychotropic substances, and their precursors. It was commonly known as The Drugs Police (Наркополиция).

The FSKN shared concurrent jurisdiction with the Federal Security Service of Russia and the Ministry of Internal Affairs (MVD). The FSKN had sole responsibility for coordinating and pursuing Russian drug investigations abroad, especially in Central Asia.

On 5 April 2016, the Federal Drug Control Service was dissolved, and its functions and authorities were transferred to Main Drugs Control Directorate of the Ministry of Internal Affairs.

== History ==
The first Anti-Drugs Independent Russian Agency was launched on 24 September 2002 under the name "The State Committee for Combat the Illicit Trafficking in Narcotic Drugs and Psychotropic Substances under the Ministry of Internal Affairs of the Russian Federation" (UNON MVD).

On 11 March 2003, the agency was transformed into the State Committee of Russian Federation to Monitor the Trafficking of Narcotic Drugs and Psychotropic Substances (GOSNARCOCONTROL). That organization eventually became the Federal Drug Control Service of Russia. Viktor Cherkesov was appointed as the chairman of the committee. With around 40,000 employees and a budget of over US$800,000, the committee surpassed the budget and staff numbers of the abolished Federal Tax Police Service of the Russian Federation. The committee began its operations on 1 July 2003.

On 6 June 2003, the Duma approved the Regulations on the State Committee of Russian Federation for the control of narcotic drugs and psychotropic substances. On 9 March 2004, The Russian Federal Drug Control Service was renamed to the Federal Service of the Russian Federation for the control of narcotic drugs and psychotropic substances and on 28 July 2004, was renamed the Russian Federal Service for Drug Control. On 12 May 2008, the president of Russia dismissed Viktor Cherkesov as director of the Russian Federal Drug Control Service. On 15 May 2008, President Dmitry Medvedev appointed the former KGB general Viktor Ivanov as a director of the Russian Federal Drug Control Service.

On 5 April 2016, the FSKN was replaced by the Main Directorate for Drugs Control of the Ministry of Internal Affairs of the Russian Federation.

== Structure ==
- State Anti-Drugs Committee (Государственный антинаркотический комитет)
  - Federal Drug Control Service
    - Directorate for Analytical Coordination
    - Operative Directorate
    - Operation and Search Directorate
    - Directorate for coordination of Operative Activities
      - Directorate for combating against Drug Crimes in Transportation
      - Directorate for combating against illegal activities in narcotics sphere
      - Directorate for combating against Money laundering
    - Department for International Cooperation
    - Investigative Department
    - Department for Special Technic Activities
    - Department for Internal Security
    - Directorate for Special Communications (Wiretapping and eavesdropping)
    - Directorate for Special Purpose (Spetsnaz Directorate)
      - "Grom" Unit («Гром») – A special unit designed to fight against illegal drugs crimes and Narco-Mafia
    - Medical Directorate
    - Directorate for Technic Support

== Tasks and missions ==
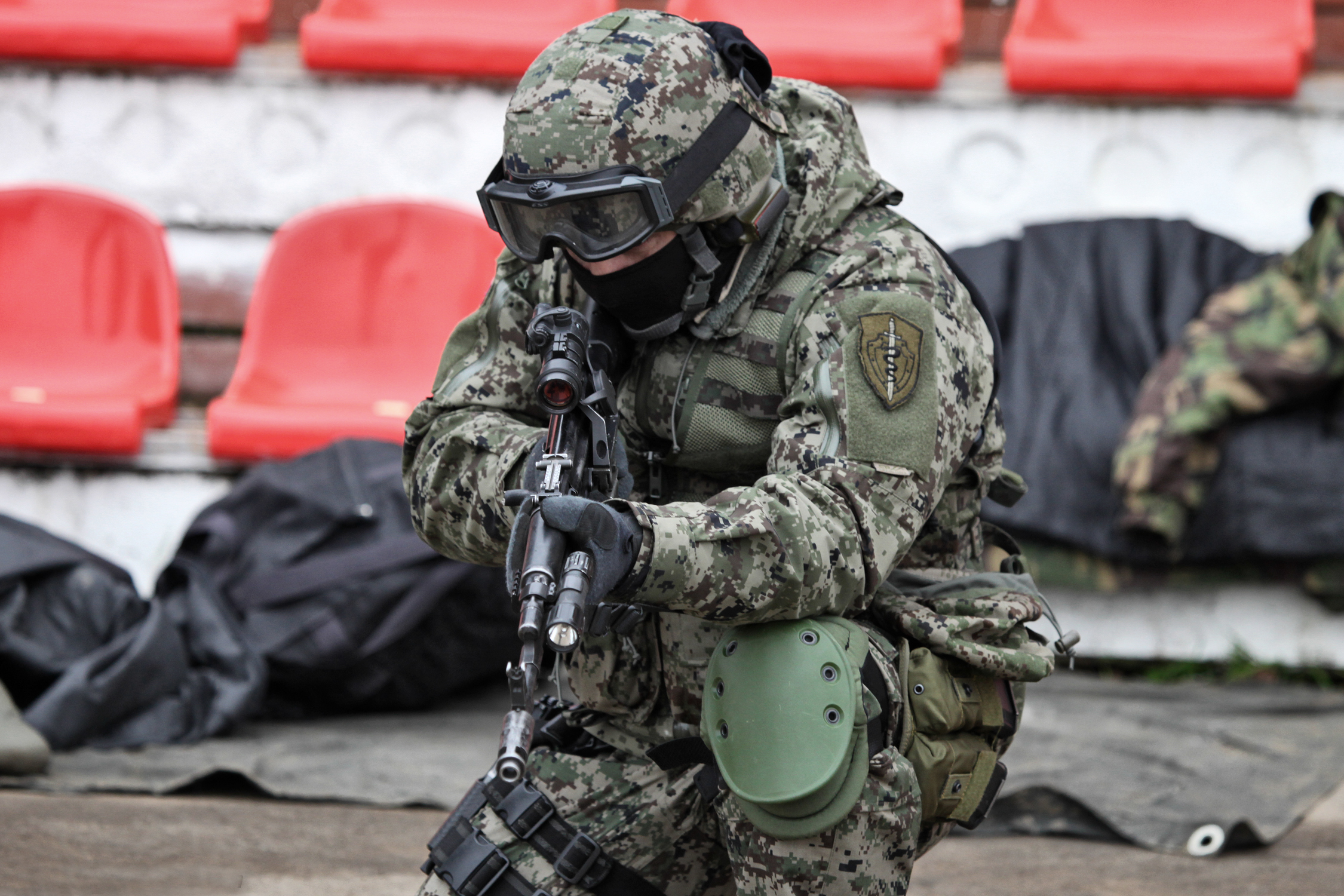
SURPAT wearing Grom Special Purpose Unit member of the Federal Drug Control Service

The main tasks of Russian Federal Drug Control Service were:

- monitoring the trafficking of drugs;
- detection, prevention, suppression, detection and preliminary investigation of crimes attributed to the investigative jurisdiction of Federal Drug Control Service of Russia;
- coordination of enforcement authorities to combat drug trafficking;
- establishment and maintenance of a unified data bank on issues related to drug trafficking, as well as to combat their illegal trafficking.

== Day of Drug Control Authorities ==
On 16 February 2008, a Decree of Russian president Vladimir Putin announced an official professional holiday on 11 March – the Day of Drug Control Authorities.

== Criticism ==
Criticism of the Federal Drug Control Service of Russia stemmed from legal concerns. For example, in 2004, the use of the analgesic medication ketamine was explicitly forbidden for use in veterinary clinics after it had been scheduled as a drug of abuse. Veterinarians, to alleviate the suffering of animals, broke the law as a result of a conflict between the legal and moral implications. The most "sensational" case was the process of Alexandra Duque.

The Federal Drug Control Service also drew criticism for allegedly rigging the results of substance inspections (for example, identifying UR-144 as JWH-018 and finding drugs that were never there), improper scheduling (such as qualifying Modafinil as a cocaine substitute) and using very vague and unspecific drug analog laws.

== Directors ==
#	Image	Director	Years	President	Notes
1		Viktor Cherkesov	24 September 2002 – 12 May 2008	Vladimir Putin	Head of the State Committee for Narcotics Control; later the Director of FSKN
2		Viktor Ivanov	May 2008 – May 2016	Dmitry Medvedev, Vladimir Putin	Head Director of Control Services

== See also ==
- Main Directorate for Drugs Control, successor
- DEA, the U.S. counterpart
- United Nations Office on Drugs and Crime
- International Narcotics Control Caucus
- International Narcotics Control Board
- Anti-Narcotics Force

== In popular culture ==
Two films were created by the Russian government about the FSKN:

- Tiski (2007) by Valery Todorovsky, starring Maksim Matveev, Fyodor Bondarchuk and Aleksey Serebryakov
- Antidur (2007) by Vladimir Shchegolkov; starring Vladimir Turchinsky and Dmitry Dyuzhev
