= Drug Enforcement Administration =

United States federal law enforcement agency

- Drug Enforcement Administration's seal

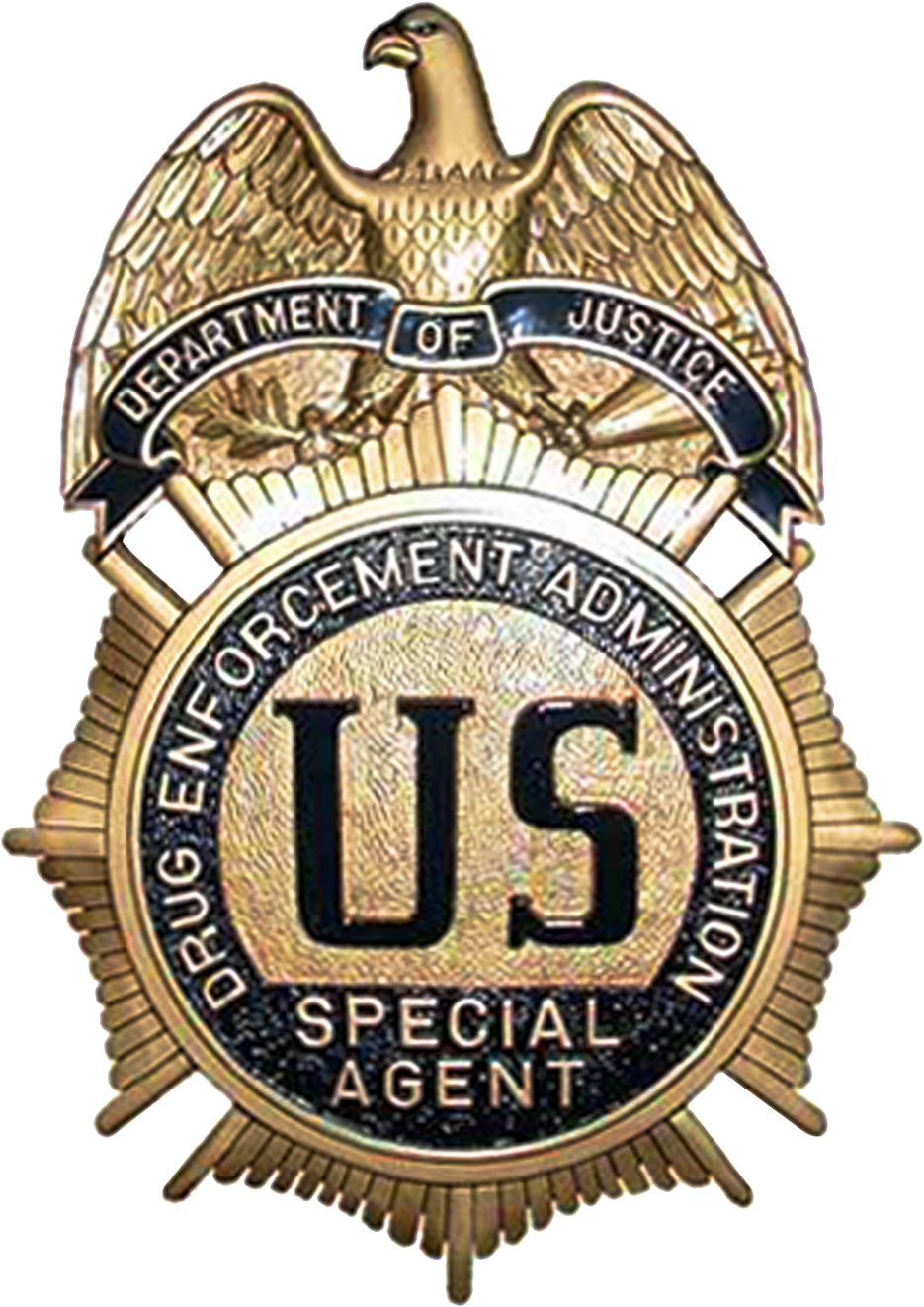
- DEA Special Agent badge

- Flag of the DEA

Agency overview
- Formed: July 1, 1973; 53 years ago
- Preceding agencies: Federal Bureau of Narcotics; Bureau of Drug Abuse Control; Bureau of Narcotics and Dangerous Drugs; Office of Drug Abuse Law Enforcement; Office of National Narcotics Intelligence
- Employees: Nearly 10,000 (2023)
- Annual budget: US$3.25 billion (FY 2026)

Jurisdictional structure
- Federal agency (Operations jurisdiction): United States
- Operations jurisdiction: United States
- Legal jurisdiction: National
- General nature: Federal law enforcement

Operational structure
- Headquarters: Arlington County, Virginia, U.S.
- Special Agents: 4,649 (2021)
- Agency executive: Terry Cole, Administrator
- Parent agency: United States Department of Justice

Website
- dea.gov

The Drug Enforcement Administration (DEA) is a United States federal law enforcement agency under the U.S. Department of Justice tasked with combating illicit drug trafficking and distribution within the U.S. It is the lead agency for domestic enforcement of the Controlled Substances Act, sharing concurrent jurisdiction with the Federal Bureau of Investigation and U.S. Customs and Border Protection. The DEA is responsible for coordinating and pursuing U.S. drug investigations both domestically and internationally.

The DEA has an intelligence unit that is also a member of the U.S. Intelligence Community. While the unit is part of the DEA chain-of-command, it also reports to the director of national intelligence. The administration has been criticized for scheduling drugs that have medicinal uses, and for focusing on operations that allow it to seize money rather than those involving drugs that cause more harm.

The DEA was established in 1973 as part of the U.S. government's war on drugs.

== History and mandate ==
The Drug Enforcement Administration was established on July 1, 1973, by Reorganization Plan No. 2 of 1973, signed by President Richard Nixon on July 28. It proposed the creation of a single federal agency to enforce the federal drug laws as well as consolidate and coordinate the government's drug control activities. Congress accepted the proposal, as they were concerned with the growing availability of drugs. As a result, the Bureau of Narcotics and Dangerous Drugs (BNDD), the Office of Drug Abuse Law Enforcement (ODALE); approximately 600 Special Agents of the Bureau of Customs, Customs Agency Service, and other federal offices merged to create the DEA.

The DEA is the primary federal agency charged with implementing and enforcing the Controlled Substances Act (CSA), which is Title II of a larger Federal Act called the Comprehensive Drug Abuse Prevention and Control Act of 1970. The DEA is responsible for drugs listed in the CSA's five drug Schedules, categories that rank drugs by their potential for harm, and whether they have a medical use. The CSA seeks to ensure legitimate access to controlled pharmaceuticals, while preventing illicit use of controlled drugs. To these ends, the DEA implements two intersecting legal schemes created by the CSA, registration provisions for entities involved in legal activities, violations of which are not usually criminal offenses, and trafficking provisions for illegal activities, violations of which are criminal offenses.

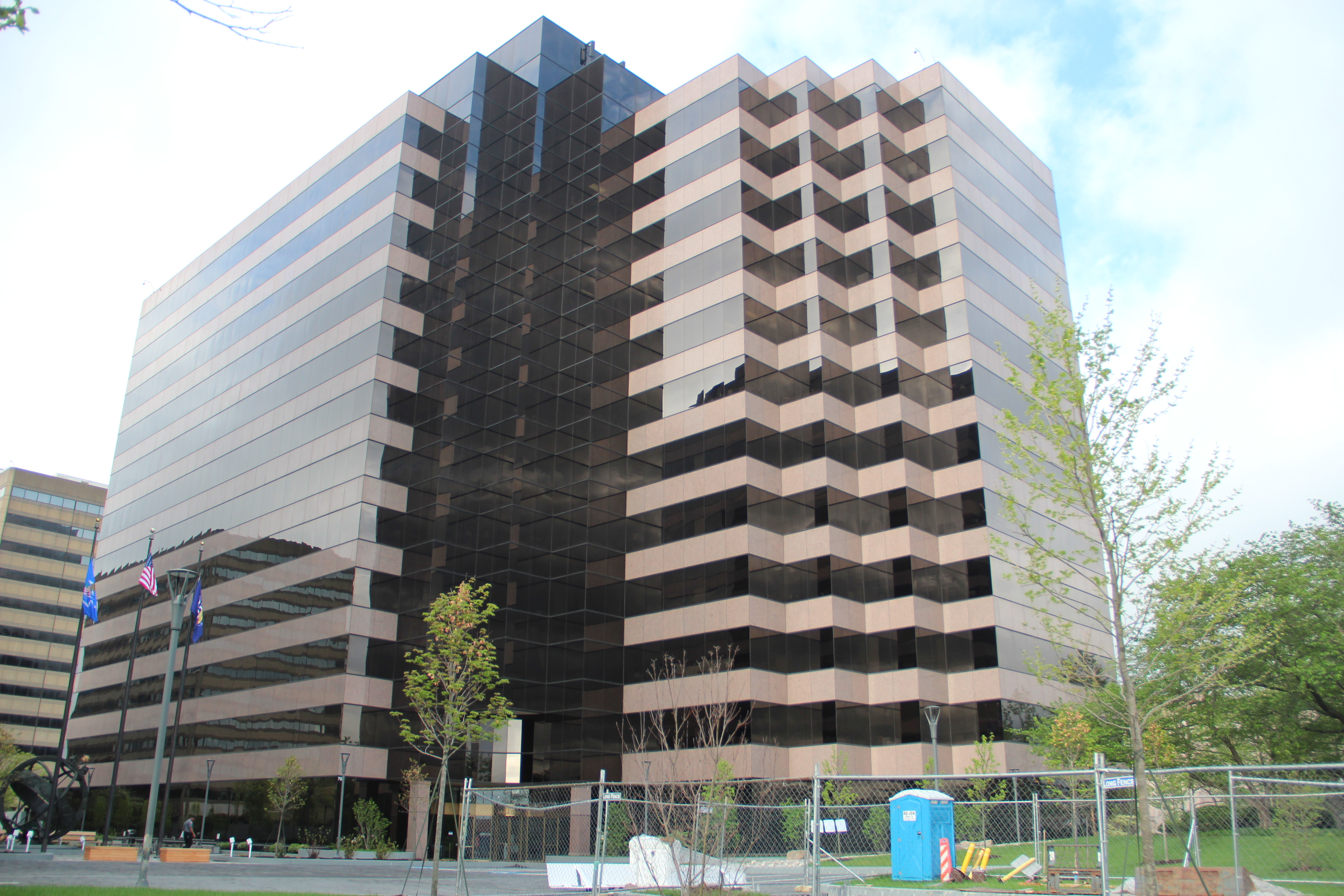
The agency's headquarters since 1989 in Arlington, Virginia

From the early 1970s, DEA headquarters was located at 1405 I ("Eye") Street NW in downtown Washington, D.C. With the overall growth of the agency in the 1980s (owing to the increased emphasis on federal drug law enforcement efforts) and concurrent growth in the headquarters staff, the DEA began to search for a new headquarters location; locations in Arkansas, Mississippi and various abandoned military bases around the United States were considered. However, then–attorney general Edwin Meese determined that the headquarters had to be located close to the attorney general's office. Thus, in 1989, the headquarters relocated to 600–700 Army-Navy Drive in the Pentagon City area of Arlington County, Virginia, near the eponymous Metro station.

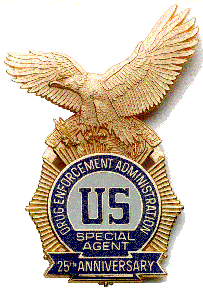
Drug Enforcement Administration 25th Anniversary badge

On April 19, 1995, Timothy McVeigh carried out a terrorist attack on the Alfred P. Murrah Federal Building in Oklahoma City. He was targeting regional offices for the Federal Bureau of Investigation (FBI), Bureau of Alcohol, Tobacco, Firearms and Explosives (ATF) and DEA, all of which had carried out raids that he viewed as unjustified intrusions on the rights of the people. This attack caused the deaths of two DEA employees, one task force member and two contractors in the Oklahoma City bombing. Subsequently, the DEA headquarters complex was classified as a Level IV installation under United States federal building security standards, meaning it was to be considered a high-risk law enforcement target for terrorists. Security measures include hydraulic steel roadplates to enforce standoff distance from the building, metal detectors and guard stations.

In February 2003, the DEA established a Digital Evidence Laboratory within its Office of Forensic Sciences.

== Organization ==
Map of the 21 DEA domestic field divisions: 1. Chicago, 2. Detroit, 3. Atlanta, 4. Dallas, 5. Denver, 6. Boston, 7. El Paso, 8. Houston, 9. Los Angeles, 10. Miami, 11. Newark, 12. New Orleans, 13. New York, 14. Philadelphia, 15. Phoenix, 16. San Diego, 17. San Francisco, 18. Seattle, 19. St. Louis, 20. Caribbean (San Juan, Puerto Rico), 21. Washington, D.C.

The DEA is headed by an administrator of the Drug Enforcement Administration appointed by the president of the United States and confirmed by the U.S. Senate. The Administrator reports to the attorney general through the deputy attorney general. The administrator is assisted by a deputy administrator, the chief of operations, the chief inspector, and three assistant administrators (for the Operations Support, Intelligence, and Human Resources divisions). Other senior staff includes the chief financial officer and the chief counsel. The administrator and deputy administrator are the only presidentially appointed personnel in the DEA; all other DEA officials are career government employees. DEA's headquarters is located in Arlington County, Virginia, across from the Pentagon. It maintains its own DEA Academy located on the Marine Corps Base Quantico at Quantico, Virginia, alongside the FBI Academy. As of August 2026, the DEA lists 241 domestic offices in 23 divisions and 91 foreign offices in 68 countries. In 2023, the agency described its workforce as nearly 10,000 employees.

Circa 2015 its headquarters and the DEA Museum were in 503,776 square feet (46,802.3 m^{2}) in Lincoln Place, a rented office building in Pentagon City in Arlington County, Virginia. In September 2018 this lease was scheduled to end. The General Services Administration (GSA), circa 2015, was checking to see where in Northern Virginia the DEA could be headquartered. In 2018 the government of the United States extended the lease at Lincoln Place, now to expire circa 2033. The DEA administration favored retaining the original location.

=== Structure ===
- Administrator
  - Deputy Administrator
    - Human Resource Division
      - Career Board
      - Board of Professional Conduct
      - Office of Training
    - Operations Division
      - Aviation Division
      - Office of Operations Management
      - Special Operations Division
      - Office of Diversion Control
      - Office of Global Enforcement
      - Office of Financial Operations
    - Intelligence Division
      - Office of National Security Intelligence (ONSI)
      - Office of Strategic Intelligence
      - Office of Special Intelligence
      - El Paso Intelligence Center
      - OCDETF Fusion Center
    - Financial Management Division
      - Office of Acquisition and Relocation Management
      - Office of Finance
      - Office of Resource Management
    - Operational Support Division
      - Office of Administration
      - Office of Information System
      - Office of Forensic Science
      - Office of Investigative Technology
    - Inspection Division
      - Office of Inspections
      - Office of Professional Responsibility
      - Office of Security Programs
    - Field Divisions and Offices

=== Special agents ===
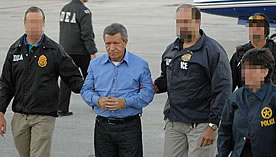
DEA agents escort Colombian drug lord Miguel Rodríguez Orejuela after his extradition to the United States in 2005.

DEA special agents are generally hired at the GL-07, GL-09, or GS-11 levels and, in some cases, at the GS-12 or GS-13 level, depending on education and experience. Special agents generally progress to the GS-13 grade within a few years after being hired. They also receive 25 percent Law Enforcement Availability Pay in addition to base and locality pay.

All special-agent candidates must attend the 14-week Basic Agent Training Program at the DEA Academy in Quantico, Virginia. The program covers physical fitness, standards of conduct, legal and academic instruction, report writing, practical exercises, driver training, defensive tactics, tactical operations, and firearms training. Applicants in the 1811 federal criminal-investigator occupational series who have completed qualifying federal criminal-investigation training may be eligible for a three-week residential program instead.

Because the DEA is responsible for enforcing the Controlled Substances Act, it applies pre-employment restrictions concerning illegal drug use. Under the policy updated June 27, 2024, applicants generally cannot have used marijuana or cannabis within three years of applying or other illegal drugs within seven years; marijuana use before age 18 is not an automatic disqualifier. DEA applicants must undergo a background investigation and drug test, and pre-employment requirements may also include a polygraph examination and medical examination.

The DEA's relatively firm stance on personal drug use contrasts with those of the Central Intelligence Agency and the Federal Bureau of Investigation, which in 2023 considered further relaxing their eligibility guidelines so as to combat dwindling recruitment rates.

=== Aviation Division ===
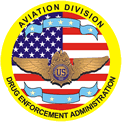
DEA Aviation Division logo

The DEA Aviation Division is headquartered at the Aviation Operations Center at Perot Field Fort Worth Alliance Airport in Fort Worth, Texas. The division has approximately 135 Special Agent/Pilots and 100 aircraft, including airplanes and helicopters, with personnel and aircraft located in the United States, the Caribbean, Central America, and South America.

The DEA shares a communications system with the Department of Defense for communication with state and regional enforcement independent of the Department of Justice and police information systems and is coordinated by an information command center called the El Paso Intelligence Center (EPIC) near El Paso, Texas.

=== Special Response Teams ===
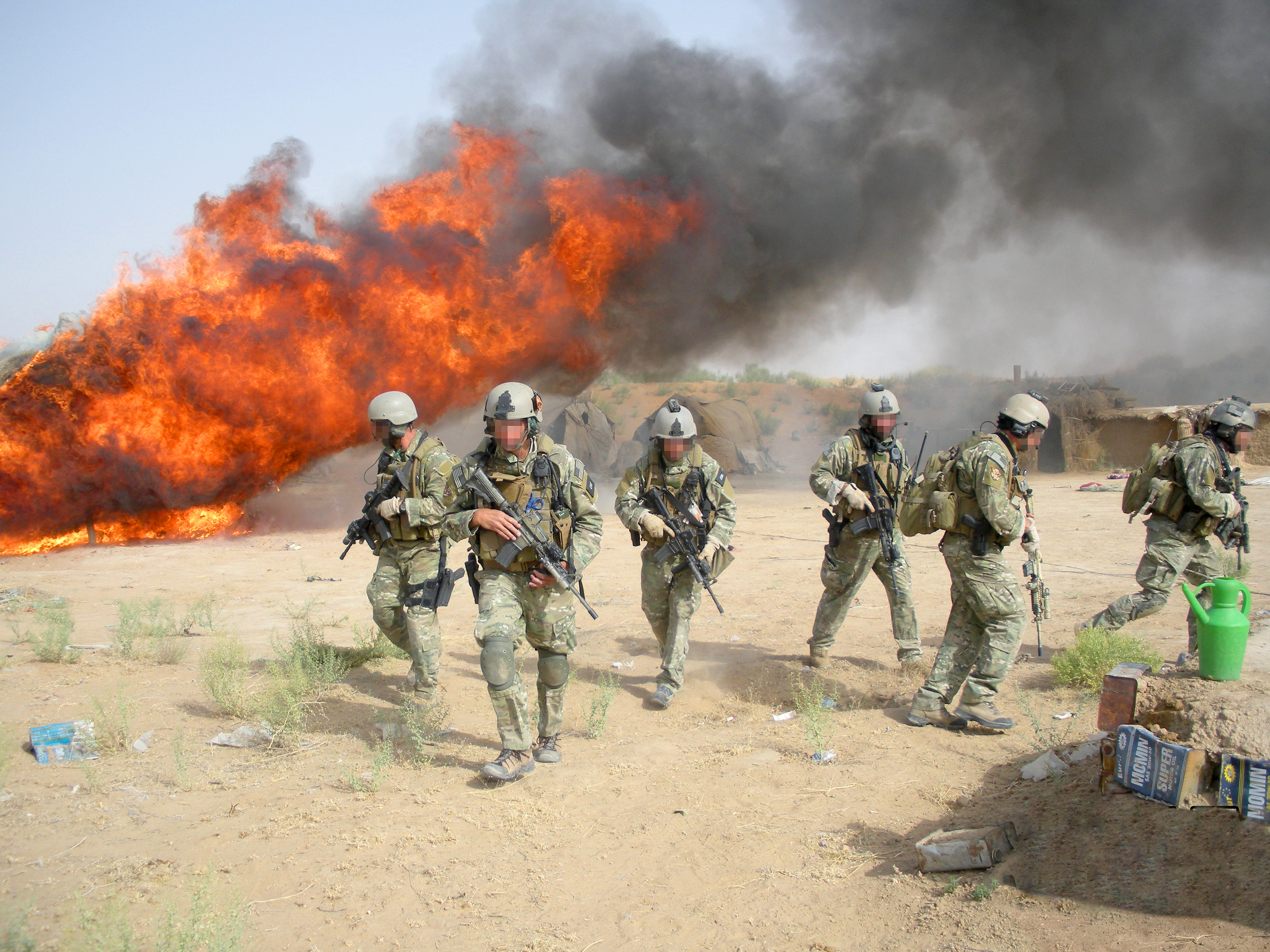
DEA agents in MultiCam uniform burning hashish seized in Operation Albatross in Afghanistan, 2007

Rapid Response Teams (RRT), previously known as Foreign-Deployed Advisory and Support Teams (FAST), were decommissioned by DEA acting administrator Chuck Rosenburg in March 2017 via memorandum. A need for domestic high-risk service teams led to the hybrid creation of specialized tactical units residing within various geographical regions throughout the United States.

DEA officially created and standardized its Special Response Team (SRT) program in 2016. The SRT was designed as a stop-gap between tactical operations conducted by field agents and those necessitating specialized tactics as a result of elevated risks. SRT operators are highly trained in various weapons systems and entry tactics/maneuvers. Because of the clandestine nature of the DEA mission, SRT training protocols and activation requirements are highly sensitive and not available to the public. Some of the SRT missions consist of high-risk arrests, vehicle assaults, air assault/infiltration, specialized surveillance, custody of high-profile individuals, dignitary and witness protection, tactical surveillance and interdiction, advanced breaching, tactical training to other police units, and urban and rural fugitive searches. Covertly located throughout the nation, DEA SRT teams are available to respond to practically any CONUS geographical area with little to no preparation or notification. The DEA SRT has been involved in several high-profile operations in recent years, however, DEA involvement is often not publicized due to operational and intelligence considerations. Considered one of the most covert outfits in federal law enforcement, very little is known about DEA SRT capabilities and its operator selection process.

In the past, DEA had other tactical teams like the High-risk Entry Apprehension Teams (HEAT) in some Field Divisions, and Operation Snowcap Teams (predecessor of FAST). The teams administered by the Mobile Enforcement Section, the Mobile Enforcement Teams (MET), and Regional Enforcement Teams (RET), were mobile investigative units intended to deploy resources to state and local agencies (MET) or DEA Field Divisions (RET) in need of assistance with a particular investigation or trafficking group. These programs ended in the early 2000s.

=== Special Operations Division ===
The DEA Special Operations Division (SOD) is a division within the DEA, which forwards information from wiretaps, intercepts, and databases from various sources to federal agents and local law enforcement officials. The SOD came under scrutiny following the 2010s global surveillance disclosures.

=== Domestic Cannabis Eradication/Suppression Program ===
The Domestic Cannabis Eradication/Suppression Program (DCE/SP) began funding eradication programs in Hawaii and California in 1979. The program rapidly expanded to include programs in 25 states by 1982. By 1985, all 50 states were participating in the DCE/SP. In 2015, the DCE/SP was responsible for the eradication of 3,932,201 cultivated outdoor cannabis plants and 325,019 indoor plants for a total of 4,257,220 marijuana plants. In addition, the DCE/SP accounted for 6,278 arrests and the seizure in excess of $29.7 million of cultivator assets.

In 2014, the DEA spent $73,000 to eradicate marijuana plants in Utah, though they did not find a single marijuana plant. Federal documents obtained by journalist Drew Atkins detail the DEA's continuing efforts to spend upwards of $14 million per year to completely eradicate marijuana within the United States despite the government funding allocation reports showing that the Marijuana Eradication Program often leads to the discovery of no marijuana plants. This prompted twelve members of Congress to push for the elimination of the program and use the money instead to fund domestic-violence prevention and deficit-reduction programs.

== Budget ==
For fiscal year 2026, the enacted amounts were $2.58034 billion for DEA Salaries and Expenses and $669.66 million for the Diversion Control Fee Account, for a combined amount of approximately $3.25 billion.

In 2018, the DEA budget was $2.086 billion. $445 million was spent on international enforcement and $1.627 billion was spent on domestic enforcement.

- Breaking foreign and domestic sources of supply ($1.0149 billion) via domestic cannabis eradication/suppression; domestic enforcement; research, engineering, and technical operations; the Foreign Cooperative Investigations Program; intelligence operations (financial intelligence, operational intelligence, strategic intelligence, and the El Paso Intelligence Center); and drug and chemical diversion control.
- Reduction of drug-related crime and violence ($181.8 million) funding state and local teams and mobile enforcement teams.
- Demand reduction ($3.3 million) via anti-legalization education, training for law enforcement personnel, youth programs, support for community-based coalitions, and sports drug awareness programs.

== Firearms ==
DEA agents' primary service weapons are the Glock 17 and Glock 19, Remington 870 12-gauge shotgun, and Rock River Arms LAR-15 semi-automatic carbine in 5.56×45mm NATO. Agents may also qualify to carry a firearm listed on an authorized carry list maintained and updated by the Firearms Training Unit (FTU), Quantico, Virginia.

Special agents may qualify with their own personally owned handguns, rifle, and shotgun, and certain handguns are allowed to be used with permission from the FTU. Agents are required to attend tactical and firearms proficiency training every quarter and to qualify with their handguns twice a year. The DEA has one of the most challenging handgun qualification courses in all of the federal law enforcement. Failure to achieve a passing qualification score is the reason for most academy dismissals and special agents in the field may have their authority to carry a firearm revoked for failure to qualify.

Basic agent trainees (BATs) who fail the initial pistol qualification course of fire are placed in a remedial program to receive additional training. In remedial training, BATs receive five extra two-hour range sessions, for a total of 10 more hours of live fire training on their issued sidearm, to further aid them in helping pass the pistol qualification. After passing their pistol qualification, Basic Agent Trainees move on to receive formal training on the DEA's standard-issue long guns and will continue to frequently shoot the agency-issued sidearms that they have already qualified on. In all, BATs receive a total of 32 firearms training sessions, when combining classroom instruction, gear issue, and pistol, rifle, and shotgun live fire training at the DEA Academy. They will shoot the qualification courses for all three weapons systems during their initial training but must pass their final qualification attempts only on their Glock pistols to become a special agent.

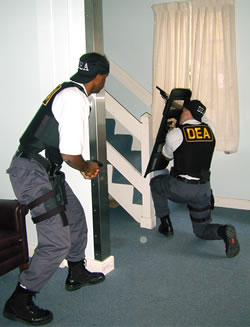
Two DEA agents in a shoot house exercise

Agents are trained to use shoulder-fired weapons, such as the Rock River LAR-15, adopted in 2004, and the LWRC M6A2, the standard carbine of DEA. The Colt 9mm SMG was previously issued, but no longer in service. Agents are required to complete a two-day (16-hour) proficiency course to carry a shoulder weapon on enforcement operations. They may carry a Rock River LAR-15 or LWRC carbine as authorized, personally owned weapons, provided they meet the same training and proficiency standards.

== Impact on the drug trade ==
In 2005, the DEA seized a reported $1.4 billion in drug trade related assets and $477 million worth of drugs. According to the White House's Office of Drug Control Policy, the total value of all of the drugs sold in the U.S. is as much as $64 billion a year, giving the DEA an efficiency rate of less than 1% at intercepting the flow of drugs into and within the United States. Critics of the DEA (including recipient of the Nobel Memorial Prize in Economic Sciences, Milton Friedman, prior to his death a member of Law Enforcement Against Prohibition) point out that demand for illegal drugs is inelastic; the people who are buying drugs will continue to buy them with little regard to price, often turning to crime to support expensive drug habits when the drug prices rise. One recent study by the DEA showed that the price of cocaine and methamphetamine is the highest it has ever been while the quality of both is at its lowest point ever. This is contrary to a collection of data done by the Office of National Drug Control Policy, which states that purity of street drugs has increased, while price has decreased. In contrast to the statistics presented by the DEA, the United States Department of Justice released data in 2003 showing that purity of methamphetamine was on the rise.

=== Registration and licensing ===
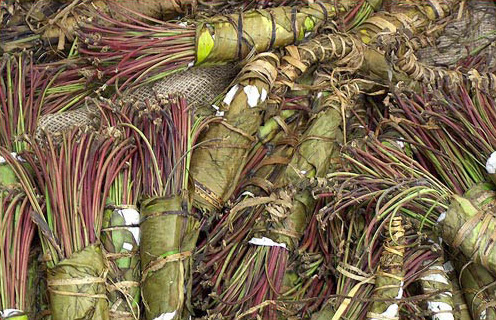
"Operation Somalia Express" was an 18-month investigation that included the coordinated takedown of a 44-member international narcotics-trafficking organization responsible for smuggling more than 25 tons of khat from the Horn of Africa to the United States.

The DEA has a registration system in place which authorizes anyone to manufacture, import, export, and distribute by filing DEA form 225, along with medical professionals, researchers and manufacturers access to "Schedule I" drugs, as well as Schedules 2, 3, 4 and 5. Authorized registrants apply for and, if granted, receive a "DEA number". An entity that has been issued a DEA number is authorized to manufacture (drug companies), distribute research, prescribe (doctors, pharmacists, nurse practitioners and physician assistants, etc.), or dispense (pharmacy) a controlled substance.

=== Diversion control system ===
Many problems associated with substance use disorders are the result of legitimately manufactured controlled substances being diverted from their lawful purpose into the illicit drug traffic. Many of the analgesics, depressants and stimulants manufactured for legitimate medical use can often carry the potential for addiction. Therefore, those scheduled substances have been brought under legal control for prevention and population safety. The goal of controls is to ensure that these "controlled substances" are readily available for medical use while preventing their distribution for illicit distribution and non-medical use. This can be a difficult task, sometimes providing difficulty for legitimate patients and healthcare providers while circumventing illegal trade and consumption of scheduled drugs.

Under federal law, all businesses which manufacture or distribute controlled drugs, all health professionals entitled to dispense, administer or prescribe them, and all pharmacies entitled to fill prescriptions must register with the DEA. Registrants must comply with a series of regulatory requirements relating to drug security, records accountability, and adherence to standards.

All of these investigations are conducted by Diversion Investigators (DIs). DIs conduct investigations to uncover and investigate suspected sources of diversion and take appropriate civil and administrative actions. Prescription Database Management Programs (PDMP) aid and facilitate investigation and surveillance.

=== Fentanyl overdose crisis ===
In 2019 and 2020, record overdoses from illicit fentanyl tablets or as a deadly adulterant in heroin have ravaged North America. An estimated 19,416 individuals died of a drug overdose in the United States in the first 3 months of 2020 compared with 16,682 in the same 3-month period in 2019; this trend was fueled by synthetic opioids (especially illicitly manufactured fentanyl and analogs). Furthermore, between May 2020 and April 2021, the estimated number of drug overdose deaths in the United States exceeded 100,000 over this time period, with 64.0% of deaths involving synthetic opioids other than methadone (the same illicitly manufactured fentanyls and analogs). In contrast, Europe has seen a decrease from heroin overdoses, and a practical absence of illicit, synthetic opioids.

Fentanyl, originally developed in the 1970s by Janssen Pharmaceutica, is a potent anesthetic primarily used in hospital or hospice settings. In Europe, heroin is mainly supplied from Western Asia (from Afghanistan and neighboring countries), and less likely to be contaminated with fentanyl. In North America, there are now fewer deaths involving heroin than either meth or cocaine, a striking change that has taken place over the last two years as heroin has all but disappeared from some regions. Due to the absence of heroin from Asian sources, fentanyl-laced heroin powder or tablets have filled that void.

In October 2021, the US reported another record in fentanyl deaths, as federal agencies were unable to stem the tide of illicit, synthetic drugs entering the US. Originally, introduced to replace much of the white powder heroin in the Eastern United States, the drug continues to move further west. Between July 2019–December 2020, illicitly manufactured fentanyl involved deaths increased sharply in midwestern (33.1%), southern (64.7%), and western (93.9%) jurisdictions.

=== MDMA DEA scheduling overturn ===
In 1985 MDMA and its analogues were under review by the American government as a drug with a potential for addiction. During this time, several public hearings on the new drug were held by the DEA. Based on all of the evidence and facts presented at the time, the DEA's administrative law judge did not see MDMA and its analogues as being of large concern and recommended that they be placed in Schedule III. The DEA administrator, expressing concern for addictive potential, overruled the recommendation and ruled that MDMA be put in Schedule I, the Controlled Substances Act's most restrictive category.

== Rank structure ==
The following is a listing of the rank structure found within the DEA (in ascending order):

- Agents
  - Agent Trainee
  - Special Agent
  - Senior Special Agent
  - Supervising Special Agent
  - Assistant Special Agent in Charge (ASAC)
  - Special Agent in Charge (SAC)
- Management
  - Assistant Administrator
  - Associate Deputy Administrator
  - Deputy Administrator
  - Principal Deputy Administrator
  - Chief of Staff
  - Administrator

== Line of duty deaths ==
Fifty-four DEA agents have been killed in the line of duty.

== Criticism and controversies ==
The DEA has been criticized for placing highly restrictive schedules on a few drugs that researchers in the fields of pharmacology and medicine regard as having medical uses. Critics assert that some such decisions are motivated primarily by political factors stemming from the U.S. government's war on drugs and that many benefits of such substances remain unrecognized due to the difficulty of conducting scientific research. A counterpoint to that criticism is that under the Controlled Substances Act it is the Department of Health and Human Services (through the Food and Drug Administration and the National Institute on Drug Abuse), not the DEA, which has the legal responsibility to make scientific and medical determinations with respect to drug scheduling; no drug can be scheduled if the secretary of health and human services recommends against it on a scientific or medical basis, and no drug can be placed in the most restrictive schedule (Schedule I) if DHHS finds that the drug has an accepted medical use. Jon Gettman's essay Science and the End of Marijuana Prohibition describes the DEA as "a fall guy to deflect responsibility from the key decision-makers" and opines, "HHS calls the shots when it comes to marijuana prohibition, and the cops at DEA and the general over at ONDCP take the heat."

The DEA is also criticized for focusing on the operations from which it can seize the most money, namely the organized cross-border trafficking of marijuana. Some individuals contemplating the nature of the DEA's charter advise that, based on danger, the DEA should be most focused on cocaine. Others suggest that, based on opiate popularity, the DEA should focus much more on prescription opiates used recreationally, which critics contend comes first before users switch to heroin.

Practitioners who legally prescribe medicine however must possess a valid DEA license. According to federal law, the budget of the DEA Diversion Control Program is to be paid by these license fees. In 1984 a three-year license cost $25. In 2009 the fee for a three-year license was $551. Some have likened this approach to license fees unreasonable, "like making pilot licenses support the entire Federal Aviation Administration (FAA) budget." The renewal fee for 2020 as of October 1, 2020, is $888 for a three-year license.

In 2005, the DEA estimated that it had over 4,000 informants without which they "could not effectively enforce the controlled substances laws of the United States." To gather information, agents permitted their informants to buy and sell drugs, engage in Medicaid fraud rings, and other illicit acts. Despite this, the DEA claims that they are "in compliance" with the rules for using informants to gather information about illicit activities.

=== Costs ===
The total budget of the DEA from 1972 to 2014, according to the agency website, was $50.6 billion. The agency had 11,055 employees in 2014. For the year 2014 the average cost per arrest made was $97,325.

=== Civil liberties ===
Others, such as former Republican congressman Ron Paul, the Cato Institute, The Libertarian Party and the Drug Policy Alliance criticize the very existence of the DEA and the war on drugs as both hostile, and contrary, to the concept of civil liberties by arguing that anybody should be free to put any substance they choose into their own bodies for any reason, particularly when legal drugs such as alcohol, tobacco and prescription drugs are also open to addiction, and that any harm caused by a drug user or addict to the general public is a case of conflicting civil rights. Recurrently, billions of dollars are spent yearly, focusing largely on criminal law and demand reduction campaigns, which has resulted in the imprisonment of thousands of U.S. citizens. Demand for recreational drugs is somewhat static as the market for most illegal drugs has been saturated, forcing the cartels to expand their market to Europe and other areas than the United States. As of 2026, certain FDA-approved products containing marijuana and medical marijuana products subject to qualifying state-issued licenses are controlled in Schedule III, while broader rescheduling of marijuana from Schedule I to Schedule III remains under federal administrative rulemaking.

=== Incarceration of Daniel Chong ===
In April 2012 in San Diego, California, DEA agents detained a student, Daniel Chong, and left him locked in a holding room for five days. The cell contained no food, water or bathroom facilities. When he was found, he had to be hospitalized for several days for a variety of medical problems. The incident touched off a national furor, resulting in several investigations. The incident has been described as a "Kafkaesque nightmare," a "debacle," and "one of the worst cases of its kind." Chong subsequently sued the DEA; the government settled the suit for $4.1 million.

=== Department of Justice Smart on Crime Program ===
On August 12, 2013, at the American Bar Association's House of Delegates meeting, Attorney General Eric Holder announced the "Smart on Crime" program, which is "a sweeping initiative by the Justice Department that in effect renounces several decades of tough-on-crime anti-drug legislation and policies." Holder said the program "will encourage U.S. attorneys to charge defendants only with crimes "for which the accompanying sentences are better suited to their individual conduct, rather than excessive prison terms more appropriate for violent criminals or drug kingpins..." Running through Holder's statements, the increasing economic burden of over-incarceration was stressed. As of August 2013, the Smart on Crime program is not a legislative initiative but an effort "limited to the DOJ's policy parameters."

=== International events ===
David Coleman Headley (born Daood Sayed Gilani, June 30, 1960) who was working as an informant for the U.S. Drug Enforcement Administration (DEA) simultaneously made periodic trips to Pakistan for LeT training and was one of the main conspirators in the 2008 Mumbai attacks. On January 24, 2013, Headley, then 52 years old, was sentenced by U.S. district judge Harry Leinenweber of the United States District Court for the Northern District of Illinois in Chicago to 35 years in prison for his part in the 2008 Mumbai attacks, in which at least 164 victims (civilians and security personnel) and nine attackers were killed. Among the dead were 28 foreign nationals from ten countries. One attacker was captured. The bodies of many of the dead hostages showed signs of torture or disfigurement. A number of those killed were notable figures in business, media, and security services.

The DEA was accused in 2005 by the Venezuelan government of collaborating with drug traffickers, after which President Hugo Chávez decided to end any collaboration with the agency. In 2007, after the U.S. State Department criticized Venezuela in its annual report on drug trafficking, the Venezuelan Minister of Justice reiterated the accusations: "A large quantity of drug shipments left the country through that organization. We were in the presence of a new drug cartel." In his 1996 series of articles and subsequent 1999 book, both titled Dark Alliance, journalist Gary Webb asserts that the DEA helped harbor Nicaraguan drug traffickers. Notably, they allowed Oscar Danilo Blandón political asylum in the USA despite knowledge of his cocaine-trafficking organization.

The government of Bolivia has also taken similar steps to ban the DEA from operating in the country. In September 2008, Bolivia drastically reduced diplomatic ties with the United States, withdrawing its ambassador from the US and expelling the US ambassador from Bolivia. This occurred soon after Bolivian president Evo Morales expelled all DEA agents from the country due to a revolt in the traditional coca-growing Chapare Province. The Bolivian government claimed that it could not protect the agents, and Morales further accused the agency of helping incite the violence, which claimed 30 lives. National agencies were to take over control of drug management. Three years later, Bolivia and the US began to restore full diplomatic ties. However, Morales maintained that the DEA would remain unwelcome in the country, characterising it as an affront to Bolivia's "dignity and sovereignty".

In the Netherlands, both the Dutch government and the DEA have been criticized for violations of Dutch sovereignty in drug investigations. According to Peter R. de Vries, a Dutch journalist present at the 2005 trial of Henk Orlando Rommy, the DEA has admitted to activities on Dutch soil. Earlier, then Minister of Justice Piet Hein Donner, had denied to the Dutch parliament that he had given permission to the DEA for any such activities, which would have been a requirement by Dutch law in order to allow foreign agents to act within the territory.

The DEA conducted a covert operation over several years in which undercover operatives were sent to Venezuela to build drug-trafficking cases against Venezuela's leadership, including Nicolas Maduro. The plan was part of "Operation Money Badger", which the DEA and prosecutors in Miami created in 2013. It potentially breached Venezuelan and international law and therefore required the approval of the Sensitive Activity Review Committee, a secretive panel of senior State and Justice Department officials that oversees the most sensitive DEA cases involving tricky ethical, legal or foreign policy considerations.

Following the Colombian peace process, which brought an end to the Colombian conflict between the Colombian government and the Revolutionary Armed Forces of Colombia (FARC–EP), the Special Jurisdiction for Peace found that the DEA had plotted with Colombian Attorney General Néstor Humberto Martínez to fabricate drug trafficking charges against Jesús Santrich, in a bid to jeopardize the peace agreement by inciting the FARC to take up arms again.

=== Special Operations Division fabricated evidence trails ===
In 2013, Reuters published a report about the DEA's Special Operations Division (SOD) stating that it conceals where an investigative trail about a suspect truly originates from and creates a parallel set of evidence given to prosecutors, judges, and defense lawyers. This DEA program mainly affects common criminals such as drug dealers. The concealment of evidence means the defendant is unaware of how his or her investigation began and will be unable to request a review of possible sources of exculpatory evidence. Exculpatory evidence may include biased witnesses, mistakes, or entrapment. Nancy Gertner, a former federal judge who had served from 1994 to 2011 and a Harvard Law School professor, stated that "It is one thing to create special rules for national security. Ordinary crime is entirely different. It sounds like they are phonying up investigations." Andrew O'Hehir of Salon wrote that "It's the first clear evidence that the "special rules" and disregard for constitutional law that have characterized the hunt for so-called terrorists have crept into the domestic criminal justice system on a significant scale."

=== Cannabis rescheduling ===
A 2014 report by the Multidisciplinary Association for Psychedelic Studies and the Drug Policy Alliance accuses the DEA of unfairly blocking the removal of cannabis from Schedule I. The report alleges that the methods employed by the DEA to achieve this include: delaying rescheduling petitions for years, overruling DEA administrative law judges, and systematically impeding scientific research. In May 2024, the Department of Justice proposed transferring marijuana from Schedule I to Schedule III of the Controlled Substances Act. In April 2026, the Justice Department placed FDA-approved products containing marijuana and medical marijuana products subject to qualifying state-issued licenses in Schedule III, while continuing the administrative process for broader rescheduling. DEA held formal hearing proceedings on the broader proposal from June 29 through July 15, 2026. As of August 2026, the broader rescheduling remained pending, and DEA's rulemaking docket listed post-hearing transcript corrections and briefing.

=== Domestic anti-drug advocacy ===
The DEA, in addition to enforcement, also regularly engage in advocacy, specifically against rescheduling marijuana, by publishing policy-based papers on certain drugs. Figures such as Ifetayo Harvey, founder and executive of the People of Color Psychedelic Collective, have criticized the DEA for using tax dollars in what they call an attempt to change public opinion, a practice they call an overreach from the scope of the agency's job of enforcement. They claim that the DEA releasing such non-peer-reviewed reports is a transparent attempt to justify its own activities and that since it is not by law an advocacy group but rather a legal enforcement group, those press releases are tantamount to what they consider domestic propaganda.

=== Insufficient monitoring of David Headley ===
The DEA faced a major setback for not keeping stringent observation on Pakistani-American informant David Headley, for involvement in the November 2008 terror attacks in Mumbai, as well as conspiring a terror attack on the Danish newspaper Jyllands-Posten for the cartoons of Muhammad. Headley, while working with the DEA, took part in the plot by providing reconnaissance to the Pakistan based terror outfit Lashkar-e-Taiba, which he was introduced to while visiting Pakistan. On January 24, 2013, a U.S. federal court eventually sentenced Headley to 35 years in prison for his role in Mumbai and Copenhagen.

=== Scheduling of psychedelic drugs ===
On January 14, 2022, the DEA proposed moving five unscheduled and relatively obscure psychedelic drugs of the tryptamine family, including 4-OH-DiPT, 5-MeO-AMT, 5-MeO-MiPT, 5-MeO-DET, and DiPT, into the Schedule I controlled substances category in the United States. A large number of individuals and organizations from the psychedelic community and medical industry publicly challenged and opposed the proposal. On July 22, 2022, facing pressure, the DEA withdrew the proposal.

In December 2023, the DEA announced a second attempt to schedule two other obscure and little-used psychedelic drugs, DOI and DOC. DOI is notable in being extensively used in scientific research in the study of the serotonin 5-HT_{2A} receptor and psychedelic drugs, including as a standard radiolabel for serotonin 5-HT_{2A} receptor ligand and affinity studies and as a psychedelic drug in animal studies. The proposal again was met with opposition. Owing to very long durations (e.g., 16–30 hours) that users find intolerable, DOI and other DOx drugs have seen very little recreational use. By attempting to schedule DOI and make it more difficult to access for research purposes in spite of it not being a significant drug of recreational use, the DEA has been accused of trying to interfere with or sabotage the field of psychedelic science and medicine. The developments have been covered by journalist Hamilton Morris and others.

== Raids on medical marijuana dispensaries ==
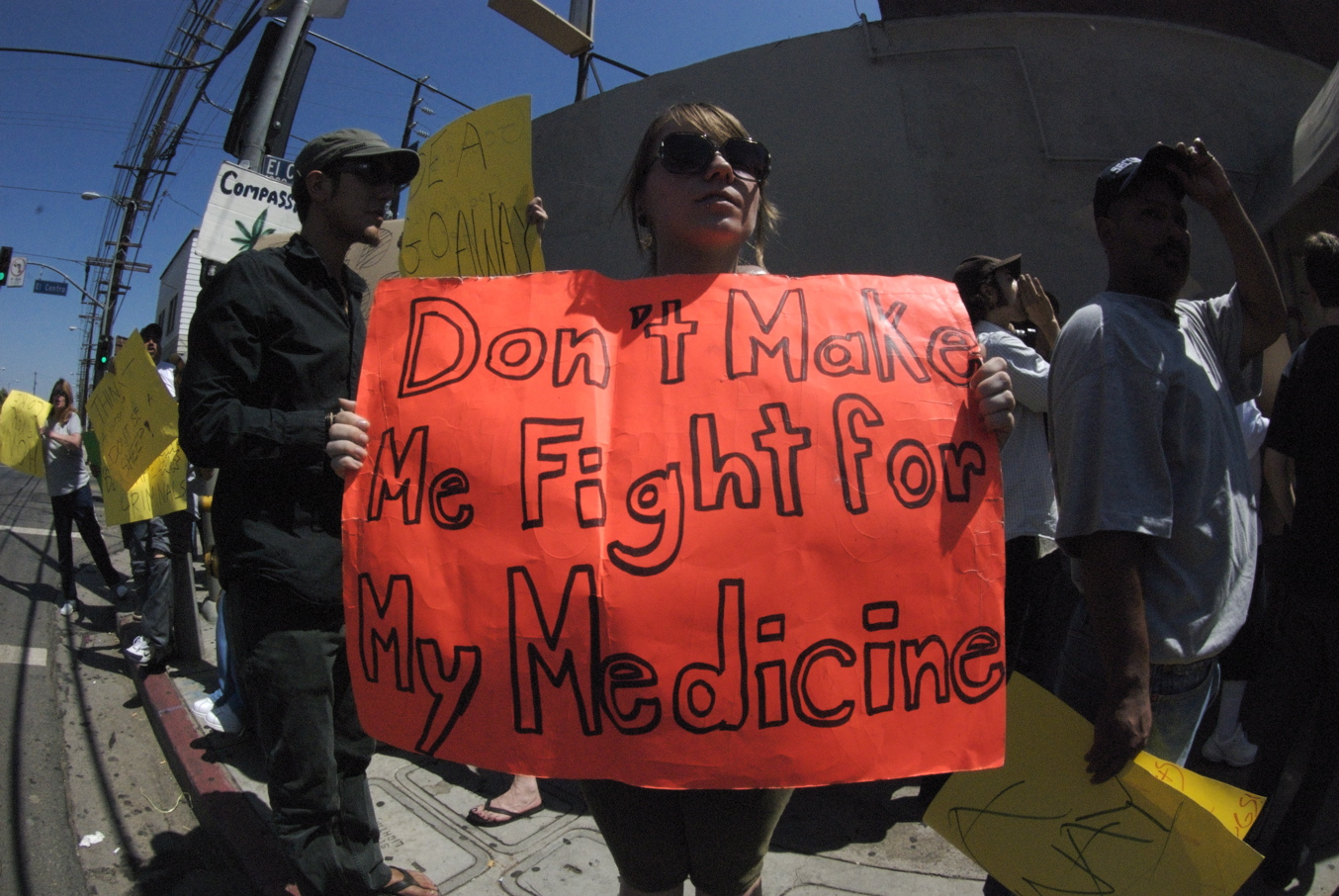
People protesting medical marijuana raids

The DEA has taken a particularly strong stance on enforcement of the Controlled Substances Act on persons and organizations acting within state laws that allow medical cannabis cultivation and distribution. Former DEA chief Chuck Rosenberg had made negative comments on patients who use medical marijuana, saying he considered medical marijuana to be a "joke". As a reaction against the negative statements made by Rosenberg towards medical marijuana, an international online petition has been formed. More than 159,737 signatures have been gathered globally with the intention that Rosenberg be fired or forced to resign as head of DEA.

"The people of California and the County of Santa Cruz have overwhelmingly supported the provision of medical marijuana for people who have serious illnesses," county Supervisor Mardi Wormhoudt told the San Francisco Chronicle. "These people (blocking the road) are people with AIDS and cancer and other grave illnesses. To attack these people, who work collectively and have never taken money for their work, is outrageous."

As a result, the Wo/Men's Alliance for Medical Marijuana, with the City and County of Santa Cruz, had sued the DEA, Attorney General Michael Mukasey, and the ONDCP. The most recent court decision rejected the government's motion to dismiss, which allowed discovery to move forward. The American Civil Liberties Union hailed the decision as "a first-of-its-kind ruling."

More recently, the DEA has escalated its enforcement efforts on the recently proliferated Los Angeles area medical cannabis collectives. On July 25, 2007, the DEA raided the California Patients Group, Hollywood Compassionate Collective, and Natural Hybrid (NHI Caregivers) in Hollywood, California. Earlier that day, the operators of those collectives participated in a press conference with LA City Council members announcing the city's intention to regulate the collectives and asking the DEA to halt raids on collectives while the City drafted regulations. The dispensary operator of Natural Hybrid (NHI Caregivers) was forced to close down the collective due to the tremendous loss caused by the DEA conducted joint task force raid against them.

== Project Cassandra ==
In 2008 the Special Operations part of the agency launched a multi-agency effort named Project Cassandra to investigate Hezbollah for allegations of illicit drug trafficking and terrorist financing. The investigation identified an Iranian cell in the U.S. which worked in concert with a Lebanese bank called the Lebanese Canadian Bank to launder money using the purchase of used automobiles exported to Africa. Project Cassandra also identified hemispheric drug syndicates involved in cocaine trafficking in order to finance Hezbollah activities. The Department of Justice issued several sealed indictments but declined to seize, prosecute, extradite, or further investigate likely targets of these alleged foreign criminal activities operating in the United States due to White House diplomatic objectives involving the international nuclear agreement with Iran. On December 22, 2017, Attorney General Jeff Sessions ordered a review of prior cases in the project.

== DEA Museum ==
In 1999, the DEA opened the Drug Enforcement Administration Museum in Arlington County, Virginia. The original permanent exhibit – Illegal Drugs in America: A Modern History – remains the museum's centerpiece. The exhibit features "the more than 150 year history of drugs and drug abuse and the DEA," including a considerable collection of drug paraphernalia and an image of a smiling drug vendor under the heading "Jimmy's Joint".

== In popular culture ==
The DEA is commonly featured in crime drama films and television series, both as protagonist and antagonist.

- Hank Schrader is one of the main protagonists in AMC's Breaking Bad. He is a DEA agent, later promoted to ASAC, and the brother-in-law of drug kingpin Walter White. For most of the series, he investigates Walt's alter ego Heisenberg without knowing his true identity.
- Javier Peña and Stephen Murphy are two of the main protagonists in Netflix's Narcos. The series follows their pursuit of Colombian drug lord Pablo Escobar and is based in part on the events surrounding Escobar's death on December 2, 1993.
- Norman Stansfield leads a team of corrupt DEA agents who, along with the NYPD, hunt an assassin in the 1994 film Léon: The Professional.
- In the film Sabotage, a group of special agents from the DEA's Special Operations Team are targeted after stealing a large amount of cartel cash during a raid.
- Alex Walker, the protagonist of the crime series Almost Paradise, is a retired DEA agent who uses his experience to work with the Mactan Police Department in fighting crime.
- In FX's Snowfall, Teddy McDonald, using the alias Reed Thompson, is a CIA operative posing as a disgraced DEA agent. He secretly runs a cocaine pipeline with Franklin Saint to fund the Nicaraguan Contras.

== See also ==
- DEA Purple Heart Award
- Departamento Administrativo de Seguridad (former Colombian counterpart)
- Diplomatic Security Service (DSS), U.S. State Department
- Federal Bureau of Investigation (FBI)
- Federal Drug Control Service (Russian former counterpart)
- Immigration and Customs Enforcement (ICE)
- List of drug cartels in the United States
- List of United States federal law enforcement agencies
- Main Directorate for Drugs Control (Russian counterpart)
- Office of Criminal Investigations
- Operation Money Badger
- Operation Panama Express
- Operation Tiburon (most successful counter-drug operation)
- Regulation of therapeutic goods in the United States
- Title 21 of the Code of Federal Regulations
- U.S. Customs and Border Protection (CBP)
