= Illegal drug trade in Lebanon =

The illegal drug trade in Lebanon involves an expanding Lebanese involvement in both drug production and trade, a phenomenon substantiated by studies. The economic and political upheaval in Lebanon, as delineated in a study by the Euro-Gulf Information Center, has driven Hezbollah, wherein narcotics serve as a notable revenue stream, to intensify its involvement in the drug economy. Western intelligence agencies estimate that Lebanon produces over 4 million pounds of hashish and 20,000 pounds of heroin annually, generating profits exceeding US$4 billion. According to The Washington Post, Lebanon's drug industry contributes substantially to the country's economy, accounting for over half of its foreign-exchange earnings.

Although the drug trade remains a major problem in Lebanon, the scale of the issue is nowhere near as large as it was during the civil war where it plausibly accounted for about half of Europe's heroin consumption and a fifth of US consumption, today Lebanon stands mostly as a transit hub for drug smuggling rather than a main producer.

According to Waleed Bukhari, Saudi Ambassador to Lebanon, there were attempts to smuggle 600 million narcotic pills from Lebanon to Saudi Arabia between 2015 and 2021. He further stated that the amount of drugs smuggled from Lebanon is enough "to drown not only Saudi Arabia but also the entire Arab world." Since the 1990s, drug smuggling has emerged as a primary source of income for the Assad regime in Syria and its ally Hezbollah. The main drug traded is Captagon, a member of the amphetamine family known as "the jihad drug," due to its use by radical groups in Syria, including, such as ISIS.

== History ==
=== Origins (1950s–1960s) ===
As per Beqaa Valley farmers, a farm located approximately 30 km from the capital Beirut and near the Syrian border is the epicenter of the drug industry. Lebanon has grown marijuana for millennia prior to its independence declaration in 1943.

During the 1950s and 1960s, the United States Drug Enforcement Agency (DEA) and its predecessor agencies considered Lebanon to be one of the most crucial locations for the production and trafficking of hashish and opium globally. The article suggests that the trades could have potentially contributed up to a third or more to Lebanon's gross domestic product.

According to Jonathan V. Marshall, nearly all senior government officials, customs agents, senior security personnel, commercial figures, and major landowners—particularly in the fertile Bakaa Valley area—were associated with drug trade, and many derived substantial incomes from it. While information is scant, Marshall asserts that this early "black economy" played a significant role in Lebanon's economic development and rise to prominence as a regional trading hub.

=== Lebanon's drug Industry during the Civil War (1970s–1980s) ===
The drug industry in Lebanon was significantly expanded during the Lebanese Civil War (1975–1990). One month after the eruption of the civil war, German police uncovered nearly 3 tons of Lebanese hashish. This was the largest drug seizure in the country's history.

By 1977, Lebanese farmers were growing marijuana over 10,000 acres of cannabis fields valued at approximately a billion dollars, reaching by the end of the civil war (1990) 125,000 acres, or 49% of northern Bakka valley land. As the war progressed, so did the drug industry. In 1976, Syrian military took control over the Bakaa valley and by 1982, under the watchful eye of Syria's occupying army, marijuana fields covered nearly 90 percent of the region.

Toward the mid-1980s, poppy fields started replacing marijuana fields, beginning heroin production, with its trade reaching billions of dollars. According to Fawwaz Traboulsi, in his book "Culture et commerce de drogue au Liban", secret laboratories were reportedly processing not only heroin but also Colombian cocaine, contributed to the expanding narcotics market in Lebanon. The estimated production value amounted to $6 billion, eventually reaching a high of $150 billion, paying parties involved in the trade an estimate of $500 million to $1 billion annually. The product shift gained popularity due to its higher value and smuggling became easier due to its lighter weight, increasing drug revenues substantially. According to Elizabeth Picard, Trafficking was not only tolerated by the state but the country's political elite group was directly involved in the industry.

As the government's authority weakened in the country, marijuana and opium became important sources of income for various militias and political factions. Trafficking increased during the war, taking advantage of the situation. According to Picard, the initiation of Lebanon's protracted and civil war cannot be attributed to the drug war lords, as they had been conducting their illicit trade relatively without interference for a considerable period. However, the conflict created a demand for secure pathways to transport their marijuana and opium yields, and the militias sought financial resources. This led to a symbiotic alliance between the two parties.

Toward the end of the civil war, the State Department's Bureau of International Narcotics Matters defined Lebanon as the "key processing transshipment center in the Middle East for opiates, with the emergence of about one hundred from 1985 to 1987. In 1988, heroin production reached about ten tons."

In the 1980s, Syria, which had a significant military presence in Lebanon, particularly in the Beqaa Valley, played a central role in controlling and benefiting from the drug trade according to The Washington Post. Syrian military and intelligence officers stationed in the Beqaa were directly or indirectly involved in trafficking, leading to substantial financial gains. The involvement of high-ranking Syrian officials, possibly reaching the inner circle of Syria's government, was suspected.

=== Post civil-war area (1990s–2000s) ===
After the civil war in Lebanon ended, the country faced the challenge of rebuilding itself. According to the 2007 report by The Global Initiative against Transnational Organized Crime, Lebanon witnessed a surge in its drug production industry. In the late 1980s and early 1990s, the Bekaa Valley, particularly the parts controlled by Syria, became a hub for the cultivation of narcotics. The drug trade became a major source of income for various factions and militias, who used the proceeds to finance their military activities. With the civil war fueled by drug revenues, Lebanon emerged as a significant player in the global drug market. The drug trade not only became an economic lifeline for many groups but also contributed to the destabilization of the region.

In the mid-1990s, Syria solidified its control over Lebanon, particularly in the Beqaa Valley, where drug crops were concentrated. The Syrian government, along with various factions and militias, directly or indirectly participated in drug trafficking. This period saw an escalation in the involvement of Syrian military and intelligence officers in the drug trade. The Syrian military's engagement extended from extortion of money from drug growers to independent smuggling of significant amounts of hashish and heroin to the West. During this period a significant portion of the drug harvest was smuggled to Egypt, Israel, Europe, and North America. Lebanese heroin, in particular, was noted to constitute a substantial portion of the heroin entering the United States and Western Europe.

During the beginning of the 2000s, Lebanon experienced a shift in the dynamics of the drug trade. Efforts were taken by Lebanese Christian officials to draw attention to the issue and inquiries to the Lebanese Narcotics Bureau were issued for them to glimpse into the extent of drug trafficking.

=== 2010s–2020s ===
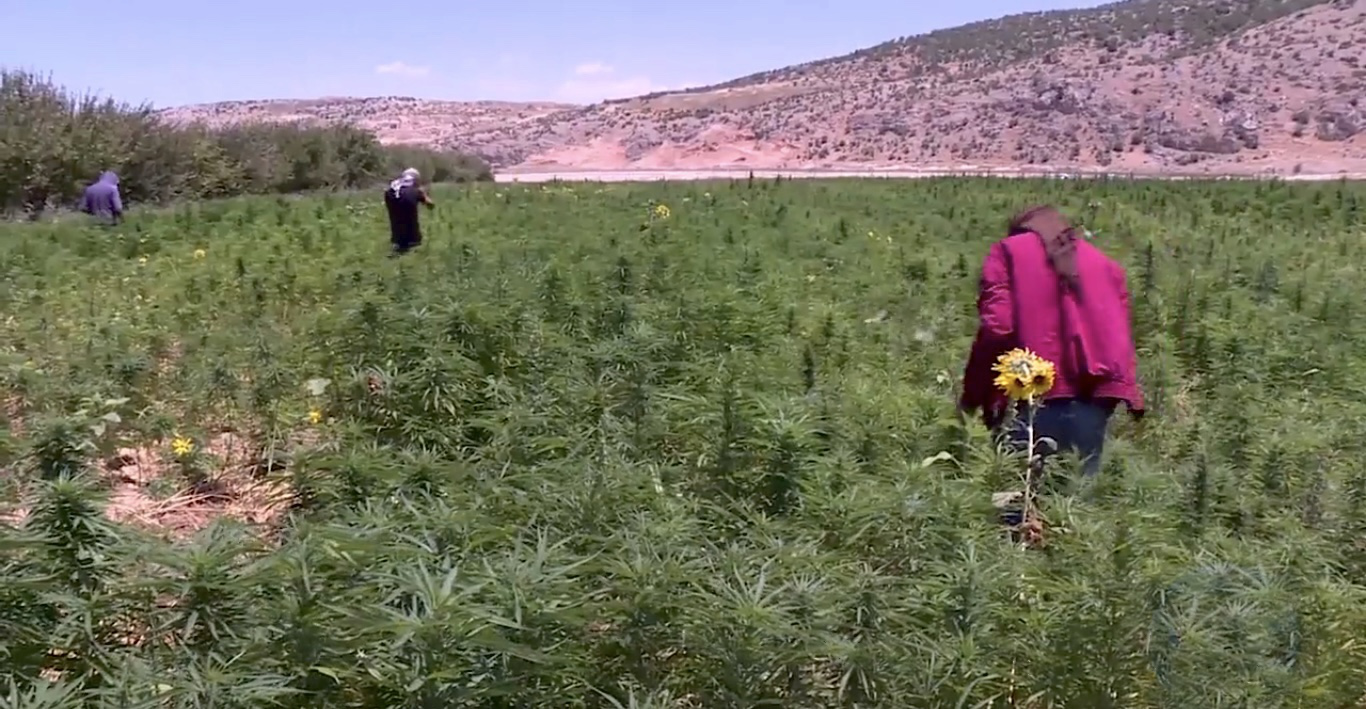
Farmers harvesting marijuana in the Bekaa Valley

Despite efforts to address the issue, the continuing inability of the government to effectively control Lebanon's drug-producing Beqaa Valley, coupled with its ongoing struggle to close illicit Captagon factories across the country, allows for the persistent occurrence of drug trades. In 2016, the Captagon business in Lebanon has been estimated to be worth more than $1 billion. During the period from 2019 to 2021, an increase in cultivation was noticed. This is due to the deepening economic crisis, the lack in law enforcement and farmers seeking to make a large income.

In April 2020, Lebanon's parliament passed a law that legalized the cultivation of cannabis when containing less than 1% THC for medical and industrial purposes. The legislation also noted criteria aimed to prevent individuals with criminal records from obtaining licenses. Critics claim that this still allowed most farmers to continue their production and expand the industry.

On 15 June 2021, Lebanon's Internal Security Forces (ISF) stopped an attempt to smuggle 37.2 kg of Captagon pills into Saudi Arabia through Beirut's Rafic Hariri International Airport. The pills were hidden inside a package of electric water pumps. Later that month another revelation was made by Saudi authorities at the port of Jeddah revealing another major drug bust, seizing an estimated 14 million Captagon pills. They were reported to be sent from Lebanon, hidden inside iron plates. Additionally, Lebanese authorities seized a batch of Captagon pills also destined for Saudi Arabia later that same year. The ISF stated that a total of 17.4 kg, the equivalent of 100,000 pills, were seized that year.

The COVID-19 pandemic only contributed to the financial strain in the region. According to the PLOS Globe Public Health report, As a result of the economic challenges faced in the ENP-South region, the drug economy has expanded, not just as a result of an increase in illicit substance demand, but also through an increase in participants in the trafficking, production, and sale of illicit substances. In Lebanon, for example, some farmers appear to have switched from growing legal crops to cannabis cultivation to supply a stable income.

During this period, the most significant drug arrest by Lebanese authorities in Bekaa was Hassan Daqou, also known as the "King of Captagon". Reports claim that Daqou was involved with Hezbollah, conducting business in Tufail, a town that overlap the border with Syria and is controlled by Hezbollah. Daqou was turned over to the Lebanese army because of official allegations for establishing a Captagon laboratory in the area and overseeing a smuggling network sending pills to Greece and Saudi Arabia.

The United Nations Office on Drugs and Crime's (UNODC) 2016 World Drug Report explains, that although Lebanon is a significant and ongoing drug state, it only represents a fraction of the global market these day. Reports show that during the period 2009–2014 the world's largest producer of cannabis resin continues to be Morocco, followed by Afghanistan and, to a lesser extent, Lebanon, India and Pakistan. The finding is echoed in the 2016 EU Drug Markets Report, with the 2016 US State Department International Narcotics Control Strategy. The Report mentioned Lebanon only as a hashish "transit point" and not a producer.

A draft report on the Ministry of Public Health's (MoPH) website titled "Inter-Ministerial Substance Use Response Strategy for Lebanon 2016–2021" claims that "increasing amounts of heroin are also being illegally cultivated in the Bekaa." However, the police say opium production has mostly stopped: "There are some opium fields, but we are eradicating them as quickly as possible. Opium production in Lebanon is not a thing." United Nations (UN), US, and European Union (EU) reports make no mention of opium or heroin production in Lebanon. The US report says heroin is trafficked through Lebanon (without mentioning an origin or destination for the illicit substance) 30 while the UN only mentions Lebanon as a traffic point for South American cocaine destined for the region and the rest of Asia.

== Drug trafficking methods and impact ==
According to a report released July 2023 by the European Monitoring Centre for Drugs and Drug Addiction (EMCDDA) and the German federal criminal police office (BKA), traffickers are increasingly using European countries to transport Captagon tablets from the Middle East to the Arabian Peninsula. The report adds that the extensive drug flow challenges European authorities attempts for dismantling trafficking networks and preventing the distribution of prohibited substances. In addition, the financial gains from drug trade contribute to international crime and may be linked to broader criminal operations.

The EEMCDDA 2023 report revealed that an average of 127 million tablets were seized in European countries, with the largest seizure recorded in 2020 in Italy. In addition, Dutch authorities have reported discovering one or two large Captagon production sites in the Netherlands, producing annually.

The report claims that the production and trafficking of Captagon is almost always linked to Syrian and Lebanese nationals who visit or live in European countries. The report makes note that European drug related criminals do not seem to be involved.

The majority of captagon is reported to being produced and trafficked from Syria and Lebanon. Their main consumer market in are Gulf nations.

Drug trafficking is often transferred in shipping containers, hidden among licit goods. When moved from countries within the region, and from the region to other drug markets trafficking will usually be by intermodal containers. Intermodal containers usually contain Captagon from Syria and Lebanon and cannabis from Lebanon, Morocco and Syria.

In contrast, when Drugs are trafficked into the ENP-South region, records mostly uncovered large volumes of cocaine shipped from South America or diverted pharmaceuticals shipped from South Asia. In addition, trafficking by commercial air and maritime transport is generally associated with smaller volumes, but a wider variety, of illicit drugs.

In 2021, the inspection on drug trade from Lebanon increased, leading a war on drugs. Hezbollah's alleged involvement in smuggling operations, along with the broader challenges facing Lebanon, strained the relationship with Gulf nations. The ban on Lebanese agricultural products by Saudi Arabia.

== Hezbollah's involvement in the drug industry ==
The post-2000 period witnessed the rise of Hezbollah and its alleged involvement in drug smuggling. Although sources say their involvement in the drug industry dates back to the 1990s, several years after armed Lebanese Shiite factions united under the Hezbollah banner to fight Israel. According to current and former U.S. law enforcement officials, the group had historical ties to the illegal drug trade in Lebanon's Beqaa Valley, with drug money becoming an early and significant source of income for them. In this period, the organization, facing financial pressures due to sanctions and political crises in Lebanon, turned to the illicit drug trade as a significant revenue source. Hezbollah's smuggling activities extended beyond drugs, involving Lebanon's subsidized resources like flour and fuel.

The first distinct drug trade by Hezbollah was done in the early 2000s, revealed by authorities who learnt of the international cocaine and money laundering led by Hezbollah financier, Chekry Harb. Quickly Hezbollah links were extended and identifies in Paraguay, Venezuela, Ecuador Peru, Bolivia, Argentina, Brazil and Chile.

A document recording a 2013 congress meeting criminalizing Hezbollah was released. In November 2011, The Lebanese drug lord, Ayman Joumaa, was arrested in the United States following allegations he was smuggling cocaine and laundering money that benefitted Hezbollah. As much as $200 million a month was laundered through his network, which included criminal associates and corrupt businesses in Colombia, the United States, Mexico, Panama, Venezuela, and Lebanon. The document claims that Hezbollah's activities in recent years is a result of the involvement of Iran, specifically by the Iranian Revolutionary Guard Corps and the Quds Force. The Director of National Intelligence, James Clapper, described the Hezbollah–Iran relationship as "a partnership agreement, with the Iranians as the senior partner.''

In addition, according the 2013 document, Hezbollah has been accused of attempted laundering of approximately $70 million from Venezuela to Germany in January 2013. The documents add their running of training camps and international narcotics smuggling operations in Venezuela, Bolivia, Honduras, Nicaragua, and even Mexico. The IRGC, Quds Force, and Hezbollah don't have to go it alone. They maintain lots of friends and allies in the world. The Venezuelans under the Chavez regime serve as one of the Iranians' closest allies. Venezuela considered a close Hezbollah ally according to the report helped them launder hundreds of millions of dollars a year and smuggle narcotics to the United States and even European markets.

US and European drug agencies are convinced that Hezbollah profits from the drug trade. Europol issued a report in 2020 cautioning that Hezbollah members were using European cities as a base for trading in "drugs and diamonds" and to launder the profits. In a later Europol report released in 2022, they stated that Hezbollah is still utilizes the EU as a hub for fundraising, recruitment, and illicit activities that generate substantial income. In 2018, the US State Department named Hezbollah among the top five global criminal organizations.

The DEA claimed to have uncovered an international drug trafficking industry worth millions of dollars linking Hezbollah, the Lebanese militant group, with Latin American cartels. They claim that these ties are directly responsible for supplying large quantities of cocaine to the European and United States drug markets.

A statement released by the agency claims that members of the militant group have been arrested by the DEA on suspicion of using money from the sale of cocaine in the United States and Europe to buy weapons in Syria. They claim that those arrested include leaders of the network's European cell, who were taken into custody. Among them was Mohamad Noureddine, who the DEA accuses of being a Lebanese money launderer for Hezbollah's financial arm.

A study by two scholars regarding Hezbollah's interference in global drug dealing was published in April 2023. According to the study, Hezbollah played a significant role in international drug trafficking and dealing over the years. Hezbollah cooperated with the South American cartel and trafficking drugs within the Triple Frontier (where Brazil, Argentina and Paraguay meet) manufactured along the Syrian-Lebanese border.

On 12 May 2023, Hezbollah secretary general Hassan Nasrallah, denied the organization's involvement in international drug trafficking. In addition, he claimed Hezbollah helped the Lebanese authorities deal with local drug dealers.

According the CSAG 2023 Information Paper, in contrast to Hezbollah's denial of drug trafficking and dealing, Hezbollah has become a leading drug producer, procurer and exporter worldwide. A senior FDD fellow, Emanuele Ottolengi, stated that "Over the past decades, Hezbollah has built a well-oiled, multibillion-dollar money-laundering and drug-trafficking machine in Latin America that cleans organized crime's ill-gotten gains through multiple waypoints in the Western hemisphere, West Africa, Europe, and the Middle East. As Treasury's designation of the Akil family shows, the networks involved are part terror and part crime."

A report published in October 2024 examines Hezbollah's recent efforts to expand its involvement in the illegal drug trade across Europe due to a severe financial downturn following intensified Israeli strikes on its leadership and infrastructure in Lebanon since September 2024. European authorities have observed a growing interest by Hezbollah in drug trafficking throughout the region. Thomas Cindric, a former special agent with the U.S. Drug Enforcement Administration, revealed that sources connected to the drug trade have reported a recent rise in Hezbollah-linked drug trafficking in Europe. In July 2025, it was reported that the Lebanese army discovered and dismantles a major Captagon factory in Yammouneh, Baalbek.

On August 9, 2025, it was reported that Lebanese authorities have eliminated Abu Salleh, one of Lebanon's most infamous drug lords, based in the Bekaa Valley. He was killed in Tal Al-Abyad in Baalbek, where he was hiding, despite knowing there were hundreds arrest warrants for him.

== See also ==
- Cannabis in Lebanon
- Syrian Captagon industry
- Hezbollah Captagon smuggling to Saudi Arabia
- Hassan Muhammad Daqqou
- 2025 Lebanese government war on drugs
