= Alexander Gelver =

American defector to the Soviet Union

- Born: 1914; Oshkosh, Wisconsin, U.S.
- Died: 1938 (aged 23–24)

Alexander Gelver (born Helver, 1914 – January 1, 1938) was an American defector to the Soviet Union who was taken there by his parents. Gelver was originally from Oshkosh, Wisconsin. At 24 years old, he wanted to return to the United States. He was stopped by Soviet police outside the U.S. Embassy in Moscow. On New Year's Day 1938, he was executed.

In 1997, it was learned that he was executed by the secret police in 1938.
