= Interpol National Central Bureau of the Ministry of Internal Affairs of Russia =

Interpol National Central Bureau of the Ministry of Internal Affairs of Russia Национальное центральное бюро Интерпола МВД России
- Emblem of the Russian Interpol
- Abbreviation: Russian Interpol

Agency overview
- Formed: September 27, 1990

Jurisdictional structure
- Federal agency: Russia
- Operations jurisdiction: Russia
- General nature: Federal law enforcement; Civilian police

Operational structure
- Headquarters: Moscow
- Agency executive: Alexander Prokopchuk

The National Central Bureau of Interpol of the Ministry of Internal Affairs of Russia is a unit of the Ministry of Internal Affairs for Russia's participation in the activities of the International Criminal Police Organization. It was formed as part of the Ministry of Internal Affairs of the USSR in 1991 after the Soviet Union was admitted to Interpol following a vote at the session of the Interpol General Assembly in Ottawa on September 27, 1990. Since then, September 27 is considered the birthday of Interpol in Russia. In 1996, a Presidential Decree of July 30, 1996 was prepared and signed, establishing the legal framework for the activities of Interpol in Russia. It carries out its activities exclusively in the field of combating ordinary crimes, without affecting crimes of a political, military, religious and racial nature.

== History ==
The Soviet Union was admitted to Interpol on September 27, 1990 at a session of the General Assembly in Ottawa. In 1991, the National Central Bureau of Interpol was created on the basis of management in the structure of the central apparatus of the Ministry of Internal Affairs of the USSR, a body that directly interacts with law enforcement and other state bodies of the USSR with the police of foreign countries and the General Secretariat of Interpol.

After the collapse of the Soviet Union, its successor was the Russian Bureau of Interpol - the National Central Bureau of Interpol of the Ministry of Internal Affairs of Russia.

Head of the National Central Bureau of Interpol of the Ministry of Internal Affairs of Russia, since November 2014, member of the Interpol Executive Committee, and since November 2016, Vice President of Interpol - Major General of Police Alexander Prokopchuk.
