= Russian police reform =

Amendments in Russian Law

Russian police reform (Russian: Закон о Полиции, Zakon o Politsii; Law on Police) is a reform initiated by then President Dmitry Medvedev to improve the efficiency of Russia's police forces, decrease corruption and improve the public image of law enforcement among other goals. On 7 February 2011, amendments were made to laws on the police force, the criminal code and the criminal procedure code.

The amendments came into force on 1 March 2011. These changes stipulate a personnel cut of 20%, the renaming of Russian law enforcers from "militsiya" (militia) to "politsiya" (police), substantial increases in salaries, centralisation of financing, and several other changes. Around 217 billion rubles ($7 billion) have been allocated from the federal budget to finance the reform.

== Background ==
The Russian law enforcers (called militsiya before the reform) had a poor public image: over half of the population admit that they do not trust the police. Compared to other countries, the trust in the police in Russia is higher than in Ukraine and Belarus, but less than in Slovakia and substantially smaller than in Western European countries such as Germany. Many people in Russia have had bad experiences with the militsiya and, when becoming victims of a crime, are reluctant to call the militsiya for help.

Corruption is widely believed to be significant among Russian law enforcement officers. According to a 2005 study by the Levada-Center research organisation, almost 60% of the surveyed police officers had additional jobs to supplement their income, and almost 20% gained additional income during working hours. The Russian state does not monitor the private business activities of its law enforcement officers. In comparison, 20–90% of policemen in the cities of the United States conduct private business, but have to report their activities to the police authorities.

Russian police are relatively poorly paid, and low wages are widely regarded as one of the main reasons for corruption and abuse of office among the law enforcement officers.

== Chronology ==
The beginning of the reforms were announced by President Dmitry Medvedev at the end of 2009. The reason for those reforms was a shooting started by a police officer at a supermarket on 29 April 2009. On 24 December 2009, the Presidential decree number 1468 was issued. It ordered the Interior Ministry to plan measures for cutting the number of law enforcement personnel by 20%, making the police salary arrive exclusively from the federal budget prohibiting funding by regional authorities. A proposal was developed by a working group consisting of 14 non-governmental human rights organisations put forward.

In early August 2010 a draft law was posted on the Internet for public discussion. The website was popular, with more than 2,000 comments posted within 24 hours of its opening. Based on citizen feedback, several modifications to the draft were made. On 27 October 2010, President Medvedev submitted the draft to the lower house of the State Duma.

On 9 October 2010, Finance Minister Alexei Kudrin announced that around 217 billion rubles ($7 billion) will go to the police reform from the federal budget in 2012–2013. Some of money will be spent in increasing police officers' salaries by 30%.

The lower house of the Duma voted to approve the bill on 28 January 2011, and the upper house followed suit on 2 February 2011. On 7 February 2011, President Medvedev signed the bill into law. The changes came into effect on 1 March 2011.

In July 2011, the Kremlin passed a law to triple the salary amount for police officers. The law also boosts pensions and other benefits for veterans and introduces subsidies to purchase housing, and also cancels the current housing provision system. For instance, a Lieutenant will now earn 33,000 to 45,000 rubles a month compared to the 10,000 ruble pay.

== Main changes and aims of the reform ==
=== Name change ===
Under the reform, the name of Russian law enforcers was changed from the Soviet-era term "militsiya" (militia) to the more universal term of "politsiya" (police) on 1 March 2011.

=== Centralisation ===
As a result of the reform, the Russian police will be made a federal-level institution, with funding accomplished fully from the federal budget. Under the old system, police units responsible for public order and petty crimes were under the jurisdiction of regional and city authorities, financed from regional budget and responsible more to the regional governors than to the federal center.

=== Changes to police and detainee rights ===
According to the new law, the detainee will receive a right to make a telephone call within 3 hours of the detention. They will also receive the right to have a lawyer and translator from the moment of their detention, and the police must inform the detainee of their rights and duties. The police will lose its right to carry out and demand checks of a company's financial and business activities. The police may also no longer detain a citizen for an hour just to find out their identity.
