= Krasnodar Krai Police =

Regional police force in Russia

Main Directorate for Internal Affairs of Krasnodar Krai (ГУ МВД России по Краснодарскому краю) or the Police of Krasnodar Krai (Полиция Краснодарского края) is the main law enforcement agency in Government of Krasnodar Krai in Southern Russia.

The central headquarters is in Krasnodar City, which held his own police force.

== History ==
The Police in Krasnodar Krai was formed by governmental decree of Kuban Oblast Government on April 18, 1918, under the command of Yan Vasilevich Poluyan. On September 29, 1937 the police became part of local branch of the NKVD.

In 1947 the NKVD became MVD, and IN 1956 the police become part of the local government.

After the dissolution of the USSR, the police continue to operate under the supervision of MVD and local government and in 1996 the police become an executive law enforcement agency called "Main Directorate for Internal Affairs of Krasnodar Krai".

On 2011 many police officers has been fired out, as part from the police reforms.

== Management ==
- Vladimir Vinevskiy, Commander of Krasnodar Krai Police, Since February 2011
  - Yuri Kuznetsov, Deputy
  - Sergei Gorbunov, Deputy, Head of Spetsnaz Services
  - Nikolai Roui, Deputy, Head of Main Investigations Directorate
  - Vasily Umnov, Deputy, Chief of Sochi Police
  - Vyacheslav Bolgov, Deputy, Head of Homefront Department

== See also ==
- Krasnodar City Police
