= Sochi Police =

Local police force of Sochi, Russia

Управления внутренних дел по городу Сочи Department for Internal Affairs of Sochi Sochi City Police Полиция Сочи
- MVD logo
- Common name: Sochi Police
- Abbreviation: UVD Sochi – УВД Сочи
- Motto: служа закону, Служим народу by serving the law, we serve the people

Agency overview
- Formed: 1881
- Preceding agency: Municipal Police
- Employees: 10,000

Jurisdictional structure
- Operations jurisdiction: Sochi, Russia
- Area: 3,505 km^{2} (1,353 sq mi)
- Population: 328,809
- Legal jurisdiction: Sochi
- Governing body: Sochi Administration
- General nature: Local civilian police

Operational structure
- Police Officers: 200 (2011/12)
- Mayor of Sochi responsible: Andrey Proshunin
- Agency executive: Vasily Umnov, Chief of Police
- Parent agency: MVD
- Units: List: Criminal Investigative Department; Maritime Police; Sochi Federal Migatory Service; Traffic Police; Muonted Police; Air Division; Tourism Police
- Territorial departments: List: Central; Lazarevsky; Khostinsky; Adler; Blinovo; Krasnaya Polyana

Facilities
- Police cars: 2,000
- Police boats: 10
- Helicopters: 8
- Horses: 120
- Dogs: 31 German Shepherds; 3 Bloodhounds

Website
- Official Site

The Sochi City Police Department (officially: Department for Internal Affairs of Sochi; in Russian: Управление внутренних дел по городу Сочи or just Sochi Police, Полиция Сочи), established in 1881, shortly after the establishment of Police Department in the Ministry of Internal Affairs. The Sochi Department for Internal Affairs is the municipal police force in Sochi.

The Sochi police is subordinate to the Ministry of Internal Affairs and the City Administration.

== History ==
The first mention of Sochi police authority policing refers to the period of armed rebellion in 1905–1906.

In conditions of high social tension there is a danger of extremism and armed conflict. The people's courts and people's Militia – the first revolutionary government agencies, created a group of police officers in Sochi.

At the end of February 1917 in Russia, won the bourgeois-democratic revolution. In March 1917 the Government Commissioner D. Konchalovsky signed a document that tells about what "people" elected, and the police began their duties, and that the hallmark of a policeman will be a white patch on the sleeve.

In the same way, and formed the Militsiya in Sochi, which lasted until January 1918 the Chief of Police H. Sokolsky often invited to his Commissar of Internal Affairs of the Provisional Government.

During the meeting of the New eve in 1918 a group of drunken brawlers staged mayhem on the streets. Employees of the Sochi police thugs were arrested. Among those arrested were some Bolsheviks, were part of the Red Guard. Detachment of Red Guards of the Sochi administration was surrounded by police and had demanded the release of all detained for a New Year's brawl. In view of the numerical superiority of the Reds, the Sochi police refused to armed resistance.

After the October Revolution in November 1917 was published by order of the Petrograd Soviet, signed Felix Dzerzhinsky, the suspension of all police officers of the Provisional Government, not subordinate to the Soviet regime.

In Sochi, too, came a new government and one of the major issues that had to deal with the Revolutionary Executive Committee, was the establishment of worker-peasant Militsiiya. This decision was recorded in the minutes of the meeting of Sochi number 1 of the Congress of Soviets, held on January 5, 1918. In paragraph 14 of resolution pronyatogo Congress stated: "... the Council of Sochi Workers' and Soldiers' Deputies creates an elected police contained the means of household-and dachevladeltsev under the direction of discharge from the Council of the Red Guards."

The Soviet Militsiya continued to work as municipal police until 2011. In 2011, The Militsiya became the Politsiya.

== Territorial Departments ==
- Central Region Police Department
- Khostin Region Police Department
- Lazar Region Police Department
- Adler Region Police Department
- Blinovo Region Police Department

== Management ==
- Vasiliy Petrovich Umnov, Head of Internal Affairs Department of Sochi, also Deputy Head of Krasnodar Krai Police
- Sergei Ivanovich Ogurtsov, Deputy Head of Internal Affairs Department, also Head of Police
- Sarkis Grigoryan, Deputy Head of Internal Affairs Department, also Commander of Internal Services
- Uruzmag Dzhagaev, Deputy Head of Internal Affairs Department, also Head of Investigative Directorate
