= Primorsky Krai Police =

State police of Primorsky Krai, Russia

Directorate of the Ministry of Internal Affairs of Russia for Primorsky Krai Управления МВД России по Приморскому краю
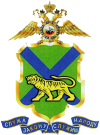
- Abbreviation: УМВД по Приморскому краю
- Motto: служа закону, Служим народу By serving the law, We serve the people

Agency overview
- Formed: 8 April 1880

Jurisdictional structure
- Operations jurisdiction: Russia
- Area: 165,900 km^{2}
- Population: 1,900,000
- Legal jurisdiction: Primorsky Krai
- General nature: Civilian police

Operational structure
- Headquarters: Vladivostok
- Minister responsible: Vladimir Kolokoltsev, Minister of Internal Affairs
- Agency executive: Andrey Nikolayev, Chief
- Parent agency: Police of Russia
- Directorates: 6: Administration; Airport; Field Operations; Criminal Investigations; Migration Service; Traffic Police

Facilities
- Stations: 12
- Airbases: 1
- Patrol cars: 900+
- Boats: 3
- Planes: 3+
- Dogs: 10+

Website
- http://www.primuvd.ru/

The Directorate of the Ministry of Internal Affairs of Russia for Primorsky Krai (Russian: Управления МВД России по Приморскому краю), commonly known as the Primorsky Krai Police, is the police of the federal subject of Primorsky Krai, Russia.

The Primorsky Krai Police is a department of the Police of Russia of the Ministry of Internal Affairs responsible for civilian law enforcement in Primorsky Krai, serving an estimated population of 1.9 million, including the daytime-commuter population and the thousands of other tourists and visitors.

Andrey Nikolayev is the current Chief of Primorsky Krai Police which is headquartered in Vladivostok.

== History ==
=== Imperial era ===
On April 8, 1880, the Vladivostok City Police Directorate (Владивостокское городское полицейское управление) was established. Prior to that, in the city since 1876 was operated a team of 12 policemen led by Chief of Police - Captain-Lieutenant Shestinsky. In 1891, the Municipal Police was Powered by the Gendarmes, and the Police department of Railway was born. In 1898, In Vladivostok created the Fortress Gendarme command. In 1907, was the first detective department was established as the Vladivostok Okhrana Department, the local authority for political investigation. In August 1909, the local Criminal Investigation Department was established and in 1910, as part of the Vladivostok City Police Department was established a Chinese police, for Chinese inmates.

=== Soviet era ===
In 1918, the Tsarist Police was dissolved and was instead that, was created the Office of Internal Affairs under NKVD, and the regional police was known as the local Militsiya. In November 1922, was created the Maritime provincial police, which were subordinate to the city, county and township offices. In 1931, In connection with the formation of Primorsky Krai Primorsky Regional Office was transformed into the boundary, with the subordination of his Ussuri management. In 1943, All municipal and district departments and offices were placed directly under the management of the boundary. In 1946, the local NKVD office was transformed into the Primorye regional administration of the USSR Ministry of Internal Affairs. In August 1950, the police was reorganized, and was created three new departments: some police services, and the department against the theft of socialist property and speculation, and was created the Division of Criminal Investigation.

=== Post-1991 ===
The regional Militsiya continued to work until the dissolution of Soviet Union in 1991, and beyond. In 2011, the Soviet-era term militsiya was officially dropped and replaced with police for all police services in Russia.

== Organization ==
- Chief of Police (Начальник полиции)
  - Deputy for Operations (Заместитель по оперативной работе)
    - Directorate for organisation of Operative-criminal activities (Управление организации оперативно-разыскной деятельности)
    - Anti-Extremism Center (Центр по противодействию экстремизму)
    - Operative Criminal Units for Detective affairs (Оперативно-разыскные части по линии уголовного розыска)
    - Operative Criminal Units for Economic Security and anti-corruption (Оперативно-разыскные части по линии экономическиой безопасности и противодействия коррупции)
    - Operative Criminal Units for Witness Security (Оперативно-разыскная часть по обеспечению безопасности лиц, подлежащих государственной защите)
    - Department of National Interpol Bureau (Отделение Национального центрального бюро Интерпола)
    - Center dog service (Центр кинологической службы)
  - Deputy for Public Security (Заместитель по общественной безопасности)
    - Directorate for Public security order (Управление организации охраны общественного порядка)
    - Department of the organization of the police precinct and divisions of juvenile (Отдел организации деятельности участковых уполномоченных полиции и подразделений по делам несовершеннолетних)
    - Temporary detention center for juvenile offenders (Центр временного содержания для несовершеннолетних правонарушителей)
    - Department of protection and escort, specialized agencies Police (Отдел организации охраны и конвоирования, спецучреждений полиции)
    - Department of the organization of administrative legislation (Отдел организации применения административного законодательства)
    - Center for the organization of the licensing and permitting (Центр организации лицензионно-разрешительной работы)
    - Traffic Police - Office of State Auto Inspection and road safety (Управление государственной автоинспекции безопасности дорожного движения)
    - Directorate for Private Security (Управление вневедомственной охраны)
  - Deputy Chief of Police (Заместитель начальника полиции)
    - Operations Department (Оперативный отдел)
    - Duty Unit (Дежурная часть)
    - Spetsnaz Center (Центр специального назначения сил оперативного реагирования)
    - Forensic: Expert Criminal Center (Экспертно-криминалистический центр)
  - Chief of Investigations (Начальник следствия)
    - Investigative Directorate (Следственное управление)
    - Investigation Department (Отдел организации дознания)
  - Deputy Chief of Police (Заместитель начальника УМВД)
    - Headquarters (Штаб)
    - Information Center (Информационный центр, ИЦ)
    - Logistical support (Подразделения тылового обеспечения)
    - Financial Support (Центр финансового обеспечения)
    - Administration (Центр административно - хозяйственного и транспортного обеспечения)
    - Center for Information Technology, Communications and Information Security (Центр информационных технологий, связи и защиты информации)
    - Operational search Unit of Internal security (Оперативно-разыскная часть собственной безопасности)
    - Legal Division (Правовой отдел)
    - Department of Information and Public Relations (Отдел информации и общественных связей)
    - Department for records and treatment (Отдел делопроизводства и режима)
    - Personnel Department (Управление по работе с личным составом
    - Professional training center (Центр профессиональной подготовки)
    - Health Center (Медико-санитарная часть)
