= Militsiya (Russia) =

Militsiya Милиция России
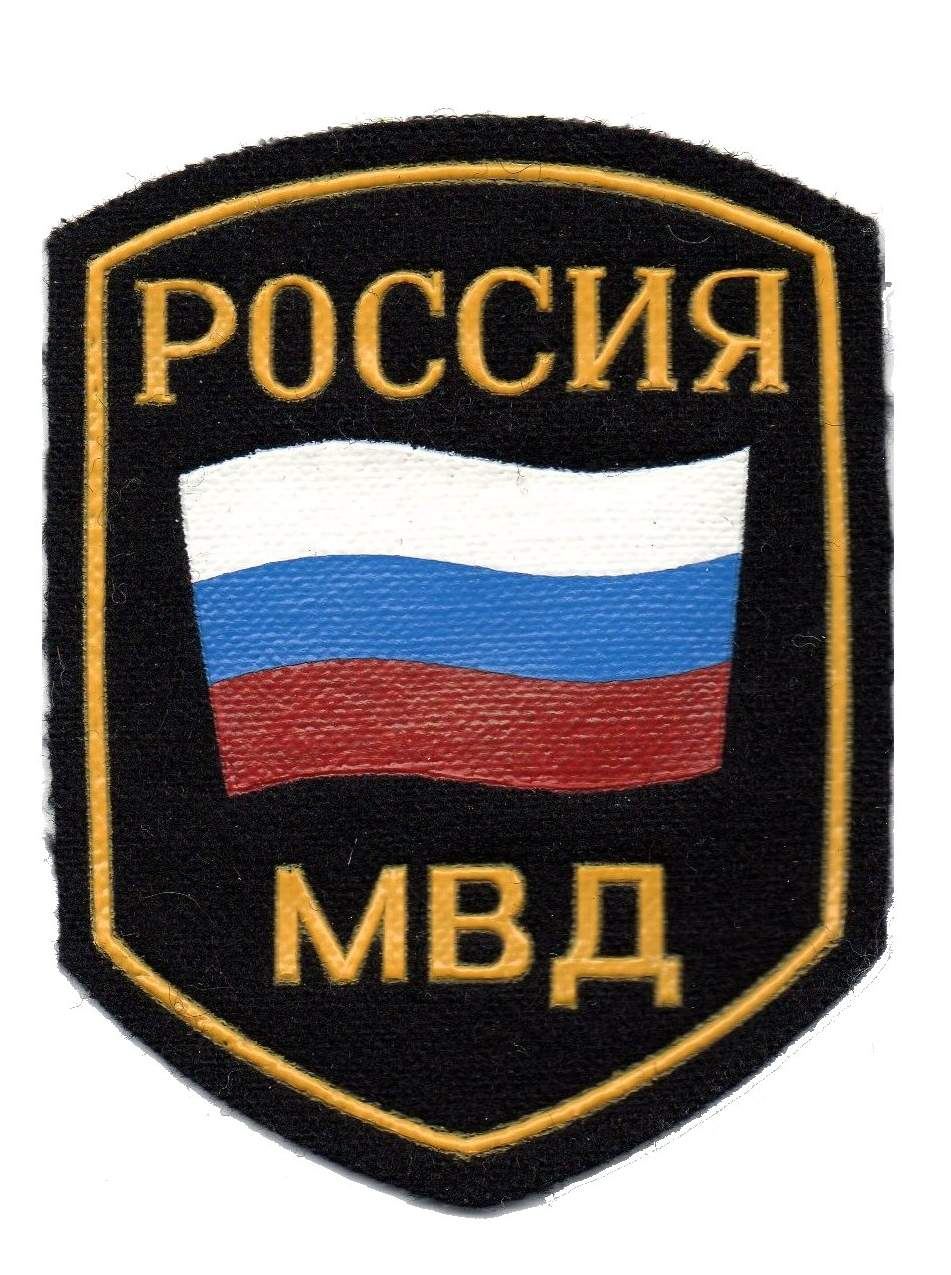

Agency overview
- Formed: 20 December 1990
- Preceding agency: Soviet Militsiya
- Dissolved: 1 March 2011
- Superseding agency: Police of Russia

Jurisdictional structure
- National agency: Russia
- Operations jurisdiction: Russia
- Map of the Federal districts of Russia
- Governing body: Government of Russia
- General nature: Civilian police

Operational structure
- Headquarters: Moscow; Russia
- Parent agency: Ministry of Internal Affairs

Website
- mvd.ru

The militsiya (Russian: Милиция) was the national police service of Russia from the 1990s until 2011, when it was replaced by the Police of Russia.

== History ==
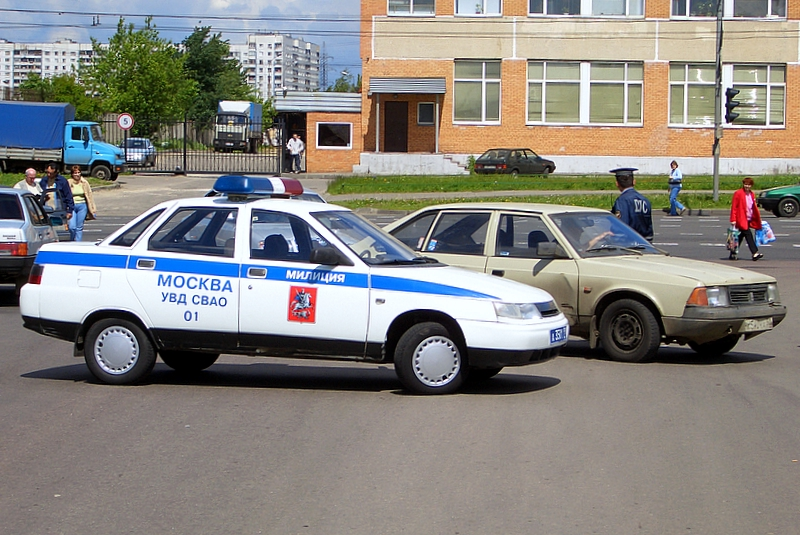
Moscow Militsiya Lada 2110.

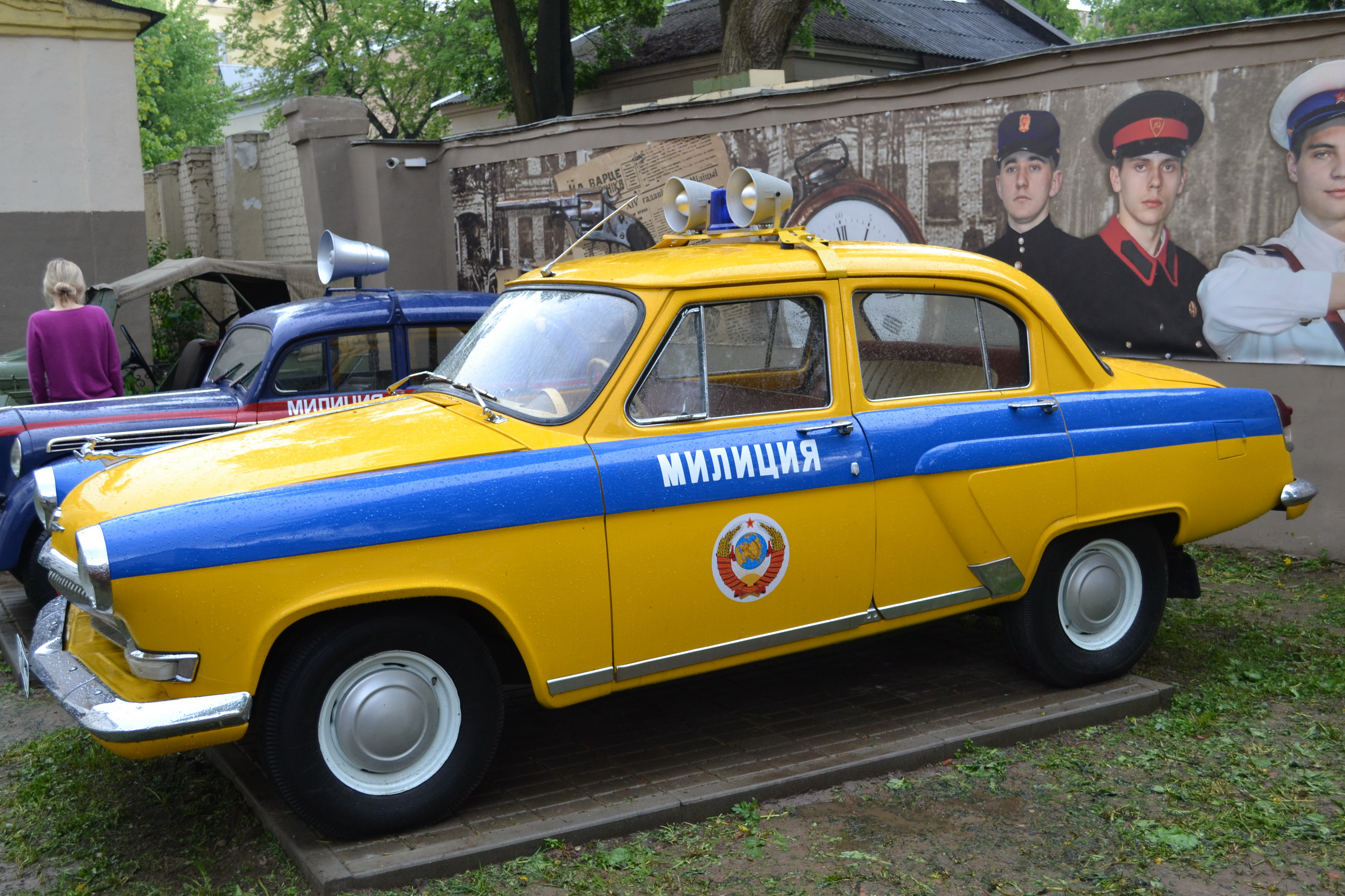
Restored Soviet GAZ-21 Volga militsiya car in Minsk 2014.

The Russian Ministry of Internal Affairs (Russian: Министерство внутренних дел, МВД, romanized: Ministerstvo vnutrennikh del, MVD) was recreated as the MVD of the Russian SFSR in 1990, following the restoration of the republican Council of Ministers and Supreme Soviet, and remained when Russia gained independence from the Soviet Union. It controlled the Militsiya, the State Road Inspection Service (GAI), and the Internal Troops. Since the disbanding of the Tax Police, it also investigates economic crimes.

The long-time additional duties of the Imperial MVD and NKVD, such as the Firefighting Service and Prisons Service, were recently moved to the Ministry of Emergency Situations and the Ministry of Justice respectively. The last reorganization abolished Main Directorates inherited from the NKVD in favour of Departments. The current minister of internal affairs in Russia is Vladimir Kolokoltsev.

Throughout the first half of the 1990s, the Russian militsiya functioned with minimal funding, equipment, and support from the legal system. The inadequacy of the force became particularly apparent during the wave of organized crime that began sweeping Russia after the beginning of perestroika. Many highly qualified individuals moved from the militsiya into better-paying jobs in the field of private security, which has expanded to meet the demands of companies needing protection, while others joined the organized crime itself. Frequent taking of bribes among the remaining members of the militsiya has damaged the force's public credibility. Numerous revelations of participation by militsiya personnel in murders, prostitution rings, information peddling, and tolerance of criminal acts have created a general public perception that all militsioners are at least taking bribes. Bribery of officers to avoid penalty for traffic violations and petty crimes is a routine and expected occurrence, as well as tortures and abusing of suspects in the custody. Up to 50–80% of suspects were reportedly tortured and beaten in order to extract a "confession."

In a 1995 poll of the public, only 5% of respondents expressed confidence in the ability of the militsiya to deal with crime in their city. Human rights organizations have accused the Moscow militsiya of racism in singling out non-Slavic individuals (especially immigrants from Russia's Caucasus republics), physical attacks, unjustified detention, and other rights violations. In 1995 Minister of Internal Affairs Anatoliy Kulikov conducted a high-profile "Clean Hands Campaign" to purge the MVD of corrupt elements. In its first year, this limited operation caught several highly placed MVD officials collecting bribes, indicating a high level of corruption throughout the agency. According to experts, the main causes of corruption are insufficient funding to train and equip personnel and pay them adequate wages, poor work discipline, lack of accountability, and fear of reprisals from organized criminals.

The Day of Russian Militsiya was held on November 10.

An opinion poll conducted by the Levada Center in early 2010 showed that 30% of Russians more or less trust the militsiya, while 67% more or less fear the institution and its representatives. 63% consider it likely that they will suffer from arbitrary action on the part of the militsiya, while 24% find this unlikely. In Moscow, 99% of the respondents expressed some degree of distrust in the militsiya.

In August 2010, President Dmitry Medvedev introduced new legislation to reform and centralize the funding of the militsiya, as well as to officially change the militsiya's name to "Police" (the term which was used in the Russian Empire). The change was performed on March 1, 2011.

== Ranks ==
According to the country law, the militsiya ranks in Russia were classified as a "special ranks of the law-enforcement service" or "special ranks". Such a ranks are in general equal to the Russian military ranks. There were 3 types of the "special ranks":

- militsiya ranks (for Ministry of internal affairs (MVD) personnel working in the general-purpose militsiya service),
- justice ranks (equal to militsya but suffixed with "of justice") – for personnel of the MVD investigatory agency departments,
- internal service ranks (suffixed with "of internal service" – in general such personnel wear the Russian military uniform) – for the personnel of MVD, Ministry of Emergency Situations and civil defense, Peneciary service on the service of: fire guard, migration service, administrative function and other.

In some cases the personnel with the special ranks could be promoted into the military rank. For example, if the officer of militsiya is removing to the Internal Troops. Another case: if it is necessary to promote the officer into the higher rank which is absent in militsiya ranks or in ranks of other special service.

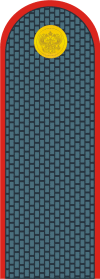
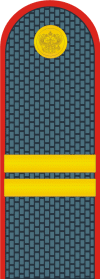
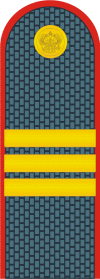
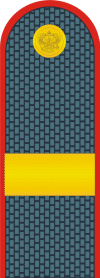
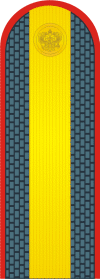
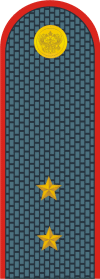
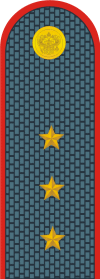
| | Private Staff | Junior Supervising Staff |
|---|---|---|---|---|---|---|---|
| Shoulder insignia for every day uniform |
| Rank | Private of militsiya | Junior sergeant of militsiya | Sergeant of militsiya | Senior sergeant of militsiya | Starshina of militsiya | Praporshchik of militsiya | Senior praporshchik of militsiya |

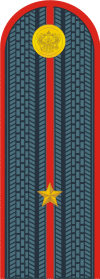
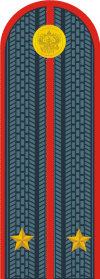
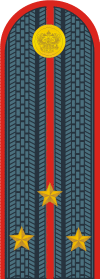
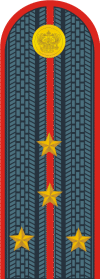
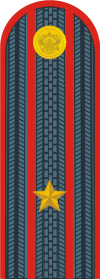
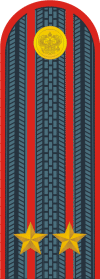
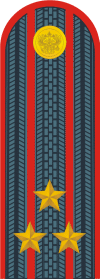
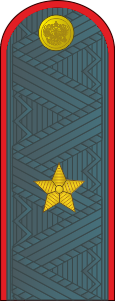
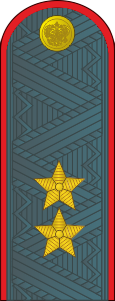
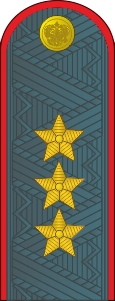
| | Medium Supervising Staff | | | | Senior Supervising Staff | | | Supreme Supervising Staff |
|---|---|---|---|---|---|---|---|---|---|---|
| Shoulder insignia for every day uniform |
| Rank | Junior lieutenant of militsiya | Lieutenant of militsiya | Senior lieutenant of militsiya | Captain of militsiya | Major of militsiya | Lieutenant colonel of militsiya | Colonel of militsiya | Major General of militsiya | Lieutenant General of militsiya | Colonel General of militsiya |

== See also ==
- Police of Russia
- Russian police reform
