= Ministry of Internal Affairs (Crimea) =

Police authority in the Reoublic of Crimea

Министерство внутренних дел по Республике Крым Міністерство внутрішніх справ по Республіці Крим Crimea's Interior Ministry
- Common name: Crimean Police
- Abbreviation: МВД Крыма
- Motto: СЛУЖИМ РОССИИ, СЛУЖИМ ЗАКОНУ! by serving Russia, we serve the law

Agency overview
- Formed: April 9, 1921 as Militsiya

Jurisdictional structure
- Operations jurisdiction: RUS
- Map of Министерство внутренних дел по Республике Крым's jurisdiction
- Area: 26,100 km2 (10,100 sq mi)
- Population: 1,966,801
- Legal jurisdiction: Republic of Crimea
- Governing body: MVD
- General nature: Local civilian police

Operational structure
- Headquarters: 10 Pushkin Street, Simferopol
- Appointment by State Council of Crimea responsible: Sergey Abisov, Interior Minister

Notables
- Anniversary: April 4

Website
- http://www.82.mvd.ru/

The Ministry of Interior in the Republic of Crimea (Note: Russian: МВД по Республике Крым, romanized: MVD po Respublike Krym; Ukrainian: Міністерство внутрішніх справ по Республіці Крим, romanized: Ministerstvo vnutrishnikh sprav po Respublitsi Krym; Crimean Tatar: Qırım içki işler nazirligi) is the de facto main police authority in Crimea in the Southern Federal District that was established by Russia after the 2014 Russian annexation of Crimea. Crimea is recognized as part of Ukraine by most of the international community. (Note: Since the annexation of Crimea by the Russian Federation, the status of the Crimea and of the city of Sevastopol is under dispute between Russia and Ukraine; Ukraine and the majority of the international community considers the Crimea and Sevastopol an integral part of Ukraine, while Russia, on the other hand, considers the Crimea and Sevastopol an integral part of Russia.)

The current minister is Sergey Abisov (Since March 1, 2014). The Ministry's Headquarters is located in Simferopol, 4 Khmelnisky B. street.

== Main functions ==
- Ensuring of protection of the human rights and freedom;
- Organization of prevention, reveal, suppression and investigation of crime, prevention and suppression of administrative delinquency
- Ensuring of public order protection in Crimea
- Ensuring of road safety in Crimea
- Organization and control for turnover of civil and staff weapon, explosives in Crimea
- Organization and control for non-governmental (private) security and detective work in Crimea
- Organization of property protection of physical and juridical parties by the agreements
- Management of subordinate interior bodies, subdivisions and organizations
- Operation of the Berkut (special police force)

== History ==
The first independent law enforcement body in Crimea was formed on April 9, 1921, with the establishment of The Extraordinary Commission of Crimean Oblast (Крымская областная Чрезвычайная комиссия) by decree No. 332 of the Revolutionary Committee of Crimea.

After the formation of Soviet Militsiya, the commission was called as Crimean Militsiya (Крыммилиция) and officially began to be named as Main Republic's Militsiya. Om March 4, 1922 the Extraordinary Commission of Crimean Oblast (local Cheka) was renamed as Crimean Political Directorate (Крымское Политуправление) with 390 officers.

In 1922 all the policing bodies in Crimea became part of the NKVD of Crimean Autonomous Soviet Socialist Republic (Управление НКВД СССР по Крымской АССР).

In March 1946 (as part of the governmental reforms) the NKVD was renamed to Ministry for Internal Affairs (УМВД Крымской области). In November 1962 the Ministry was renamed as Directorate for Public Order (Управление охраны общественного порядка, УООП Крыма) and shortly after it became Directorate for Internal Affairs under the executive committee of Crimea (Управление внутренних дел Крымоблисполкома).

After the dissolution of the Soviet Union, the Crimean Interior Ministry re-organized in May 1994 as Crimea's Main Directorate for Internal Affairs of Autonomous Republic of Crimea (ГУМВД Украины в АР Крым).

In March 2014 the Main Directorate has become the Ministry for Internal Affairs of the Republic of Crimea and was re-organized as part of Russian Policing system.

== Heads of Police and Ministers ==
=== Chief of Police ===
- Ludwig Tsyntsar (November 1921 – January 1924)
- Yan Laubets (1924)
- Tishe Lordkipanidze (1935–1937)
- N. Smirnov (1942)

=== Ministers ===
- A. Kalinin (1947–1951)
- Vasily Pogorelo (1951–1952)
- Victor Kolesnikov (1952–1953)
- Andrei Ryzhikov (1953–1964)
- Vitaly Zacharov (1964–1972)
- Anatoly Zhorich (1972–1985)
- Phillip Rusnak (1985–1991)
- Nikolay Gamiev
- Gennady Moskal
- Yuri Seleznev
- Nikolay Palamarchuk
- Vladimir Khomenko (2005–2007)
- Nikolay Ilychev (2007)
- Anatoly Mohilev (2007–2009)
- G. Moskal (2009–2010)
- Alexander Proslov (2010–2011)
- Sergey Reznikov (2011–2012)
- Mikhail Slepanev (2012–2014)
- Sergey Abisov (2014–present)

== See also ==
- Sevastopol City Police
