= Law enforcement in Russia =

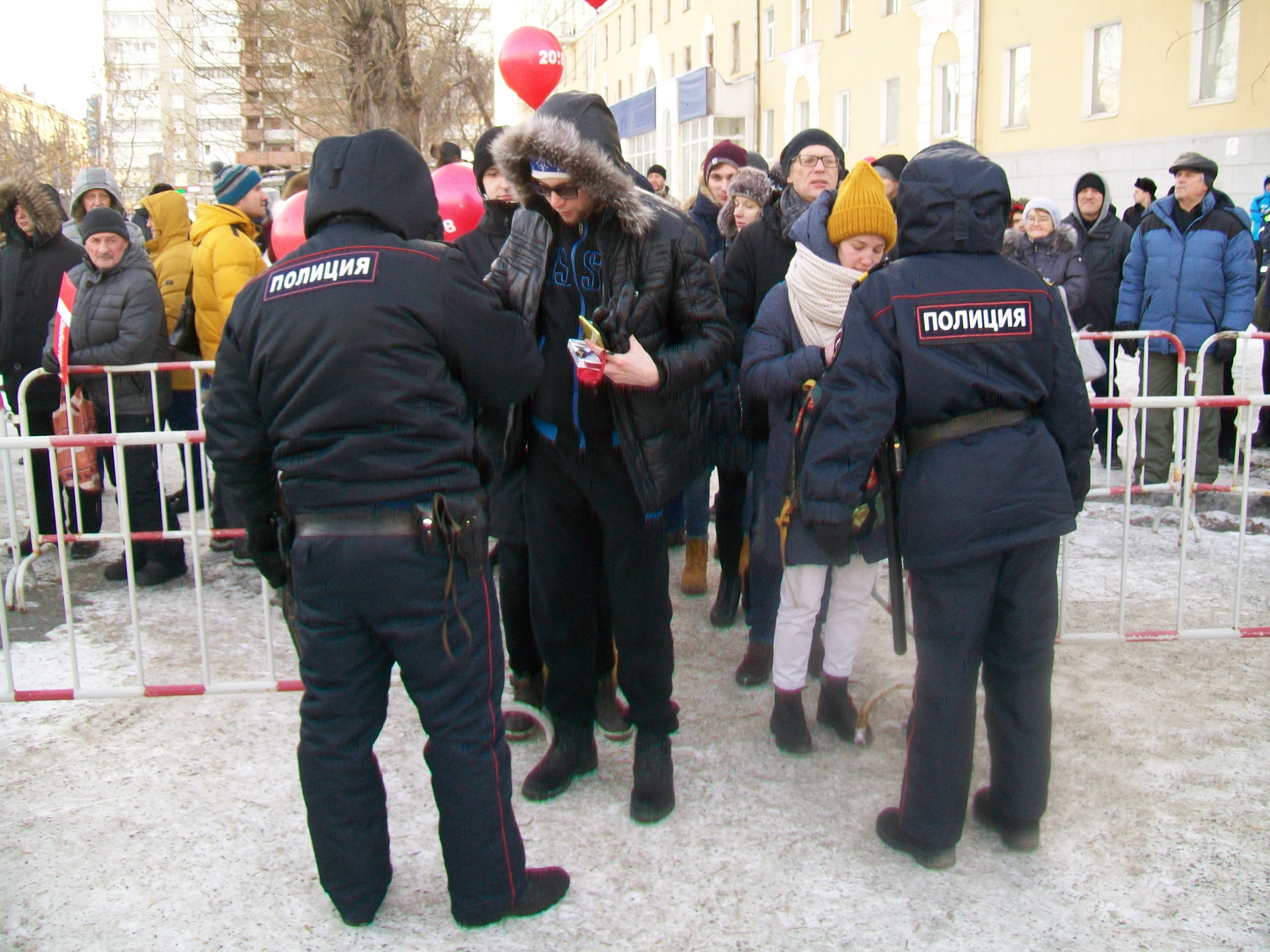
Police officers in Yekaterinburg, 2018

In the Russian Federation, law enforcement is the responsibility of a variety of different agencies. The Police of Russia (formerly the militsiya) is the primary law enforcement agency, with the Investigative Committee of Russia (SKR) as the main investigative agency, and the Federal Security Service (FSB) as the main domestic security agency.

== Agencies ==
- Ministry of Internal Affairs (MVD):
  - The Police of Russia (politsiya) provide public security functions. Formerly the militsiya
  - Main Directorate for Drugs Control
- The Investigative Committee of Russia (SKR/Sledkom) is the main federal investigative body in Russia. It operates as the Russian anti-corruption agency, investigates police misconduct and combats police corruption.
- Ministry of Justice:
  - Federal Service of Punishment Execution (FSIN) is responsible for the penal correction and prison system of Russia
- The Federal Security Service (FSB) is the domestic security service, and the main successor agency of the Soviet-era Cheka, NKVD, and Soviet KGB. Responsible for anti-terrorism operations.
  - The Federal Border Guard Service is subordinate to the FSB and responsible for border protection, surveillance and coast guard.
- Federal Customs Service
- The Ministry for Civil Defense, Emergencies and Elimination of Consequences of Natural Disasters (EMERCOM) is responsible for the civil defence regulation, protection from fire and has own troops.
- Ministry of Defence
  - Russian Military Police provides the service police function for all branches of the Russian Armed Forces.
- The National Guard (Rosgvardia), formerly Internal Troops, provide a gendarmerie function, supporting the Politsiya and dealing with large-scale riots and internal armed conflicts. They also provide security for highly-important facilities (such as nuclear power plants).
- The Federal Protective Service of Russia (FSO) is responsible for the protection of Russian state property and high-ranking government personnel, including the President of Russia.
- Presidential Security Service - concerned with the tasks related to the protection of the President of Russia.

== Prisons ==
Prisons in Russia are administered by FSIN and can be categorized under four types of facilities: pre-trial institutions; educative or juvenile labor colonies; corrective labor colonies; and prisons.

The corrective colony (Russian: Исправительно-трудовая колония, ИТК, romanized: ispravitelno-trudovaya koloniya, ITK) is the most common, with 760 institutions in 2004 across the many administrative divisions of Russia. There were also eight prisons, 62 juvenile facilities, and 192 pre-trial facilities in 2004.

== See also ==
- Crime in Russia
- Russian Intelligence Community
