= Sergey Abisov =

Ukrainian-Russian police colonel

- Сергей Абисов

Minister of Internal Affairs of the Republic of Crimea
- In office 6 May 2014 – 4 June 2018
- President: Vladimir Putin
- Preceded by: Mikhail Slepanev
- Succeeded by: Pavel Karanda (acting); Oleg Torubarov

Personal details
- Born: 27 November 1967 (age 58) Simferopol, Crimean Oblast, Ukrainian SSR, Soviet Union

Sergey Vadimovich Abisov (Russian: Сергей Вадимович Абисов; born 27 November 1967) is the former minister of Ministry of Internal Affairs for the Republic of Crimea, (Note: Since the annexation of Crimea by the Russian Federation, the status of the Crimea and of the city of Sevastopol is under dispute between Russia and Ukraine; Ukraine and the majority of the international community considers the Crimea and Sevastopol an integral part of Ukraine, while Russia, on the other hand, considers the Crimea and Sevastopol an integral part of Russia, with Sevastopol functioning as a federal city within the Crimean Federal District.) and a police colonel.

== Biography ==
He was born on November 27, 1967, in Simferopol. From 1986 to 1988, he served in the Armed Forces of the USSR. He started his work for the Soviet Ministry of Interior as a police officer, the commander of a separate battalion of militia responsible for the private security (vnevedomstvennaya okhrana) in 1988. In 1999, he graduated from Odesa State University of Internal Affairs. Since February 1998, he has been part of the Criminal Investigation Department of the Main Control Ministry of Interior of Ukraine in Crimea. On 1 March 2014, Abisov became the Acting Chief of the Interior Ministry of Ukraine in the Autonomous Republic of Crimea. Just nearly a month later, however, he became the acting Minister of Internal Affairs of the Republic of Crimea. By a decree from Vladimir Putin on May 6, 2014, Abisov was appointed as Minister of Internal Affairs of the Republic of Crimea.

Abisov has been dismissed from the Ministry of Internal Affairs of Ukraine for "high treason", and the Ukrainian authorities announced their desire to arrest Abisov. He is suspected of committing crimes under Part 1 of Article 109 of the Criminal Code of Ukraine ("actions aimed at violent change or overthrow of the constitutional order or the seizure of state power").

=== Sanctions ===
He was sanctioned by the UK government in 2014 in relation to the Russo-Ukrainian War.

Abisov is included on the list of people sanctioned by the United States, Canada, European Union, Norway, Switzerland, and other countries. On 4 June 2018, he was dismissed from office. He was replaced by Oleg Torubarov.
