= Sevastopol Police =

Ministry of Internal Affairs of Russia Department for the City of Sevastopol Управление МВД России по городу Севастополю
- Common name: Полиция Севастополя
- Abbreviation: УМВД РФ по городу Севастополю
- Motto: СЛУЖИМ РОССИИ, СЛУЖИМ ЗАКОНУ! Serving Russia and upholding the law

Agency overview
- Formed: 2014
- Preceding agency: Militsiya of Sevastopol

Jurisdictional structure
- Operations jurisdiction: Sevastopol
- Map of Ministry of Internal Affairs of Russia Department for the City of Sevastopol's jurisdiction
- Area: 864 km2 (334 sq mi)
- Population: 380,000
- Governing body: MVD
- General nature: Local civilian police

Operational structure
- Overseen by: MVD
- Headquarters: Pushkin Street 10, Sevastopol
- Elected officer responsible: Vasily Pavlov, Chief of Police
- Parent agency: MVD
- Child agency: Politsiya

Website
- Official Website

The Ministry of Internal Affairs of Russia Department for the City of Sevastopol (Russian: Управление МВД России по городу Севастополю) or the Police of Sevastopol City (Russian: Полиция Севастополя, romanized: Politsiya Sevastopolya) has been the main law enforcement agency in the government of Sevastopol since March 2014 after Russian forces seized Crimea and Sevastopol and unilaterally dissolved the local Ukrainian Militsiya of Sevastopol (Ukrainian: Міліція Севастополя, Russian: Милиция Севастополя). (Note: Since the annexation of Crimea by the Russian Federation, the status of the Crimea and of the city of Sevastopol is under dispute between Russia and Ukraine; Ukraine and the majority of the international community considers the Crimea and Sevastopol an integral part of Ukraine, while Russia, on the other hand, considers the Crimea and Sevastopol an integral part of Russia, with Sevastopol functioning as a federal city (Russian authorities are in control of both).)

It is subordinate to the regional Ministry for Internal Affairs and the governor of the City of Sevastopol.

== Background ==
The main Department of Internal Affairs is the executive agency. It is part of the system of Internal Affairs of Russian Ministry of Internal Affairs (MVD) but is also subordinate to the Sevastopol government.

The Directorate's main responsibilities are internal security, human rights and freedoms, the suppression and detection of crime, and protection of public order. The Sevastopol City Police Commissioner is the head of the Police Department.

The Commissioner is the police administrator appointed by the Governor of Sevastopol, after approval by the Sevastopol Legislative Council, by recommendation of the President of Russia. Control over the activities of the police is carried out by the Ministry of Internal Affairs of the Russian Federation, the Governor, the Government of Sevastopol and the Sevastopol City Council.

== Structure ==
- State Service combating Economic Crimes
- Department for Combating Illegal Drugs
- Main Directorate for Traffic Safety (GAI)
- State Protection Service
- Directorate for Combating Organized Crime
- Investigative Department
- Criminal Investigation Department
- Research Forensic Center
- Patrol Services

== History ==
The People's Militia in Sevastopol first appeared in 1905. This was the beginning of new developments in the field of protection and law enforcement.

Shortly after the October Revolution in 1917, it was decided to create the Protection Commissariat in order to solve problems of control and law enforcement. Later, by order of the chief of the Provincial Police and by the Resolution of Sevastopol Revolutionary Committee, on 21 May 1919, the Commissariat for the Protection of Sevastopol was renamed the Office of Soviet Workers and Peasants' Militsiya, led by Commissioner Mikhail Kanuga. Structurally, the city of Sevastopol was divided into six districts, each headed by a district police chief. The Precinct Enlistment office was renamed the Office of the Head of the District.

After the Russian Civil War, the Sevastopol police force was sent to fight gang violence.

By order of the Ministry of Internal Affairs of Crimea No. 094 from 1958, the municipal districts were divided to: Leninsky, Balaclava, and Nakhimovskiy and on 14 January 1976, the Gagarin District was formed.

After the Declaration of Independence of Ukraine on 24 August 1991, the Ukrainian Militsiya began a new stage as the police force of a sovereign state.

Ukraine inherited the police that existed in the USSR. The Ministry of Internal Affairs of Ukraine was also inherited from the police of the Ukrainian SSR. Normative-legal acts that regulate their organization and activities required significant changes.

The Sevastopol Militsiya was importantly affected by the subsequent restructuring of the Ukrainian police by legislation enacted in 1992. However, in March 2014, the Militsiya in Sevastopol was dissolved and replaced by the Russian Politsiya due to the annexation of Crimea by the Russian Federation.

== See also ==
- Ministry of Internal Affairs of Crimea
