= Ministry of Internal Affairs (Russia) =

Government ministry of Russia

Ministry of Internal Affairs of the Russian Federation
- Министерство внутренних дел Российской Федерации; Ministerstvo vnutrennikh del Rossiyskoy Federatsii
- Ministry emblem

- Ministry flag

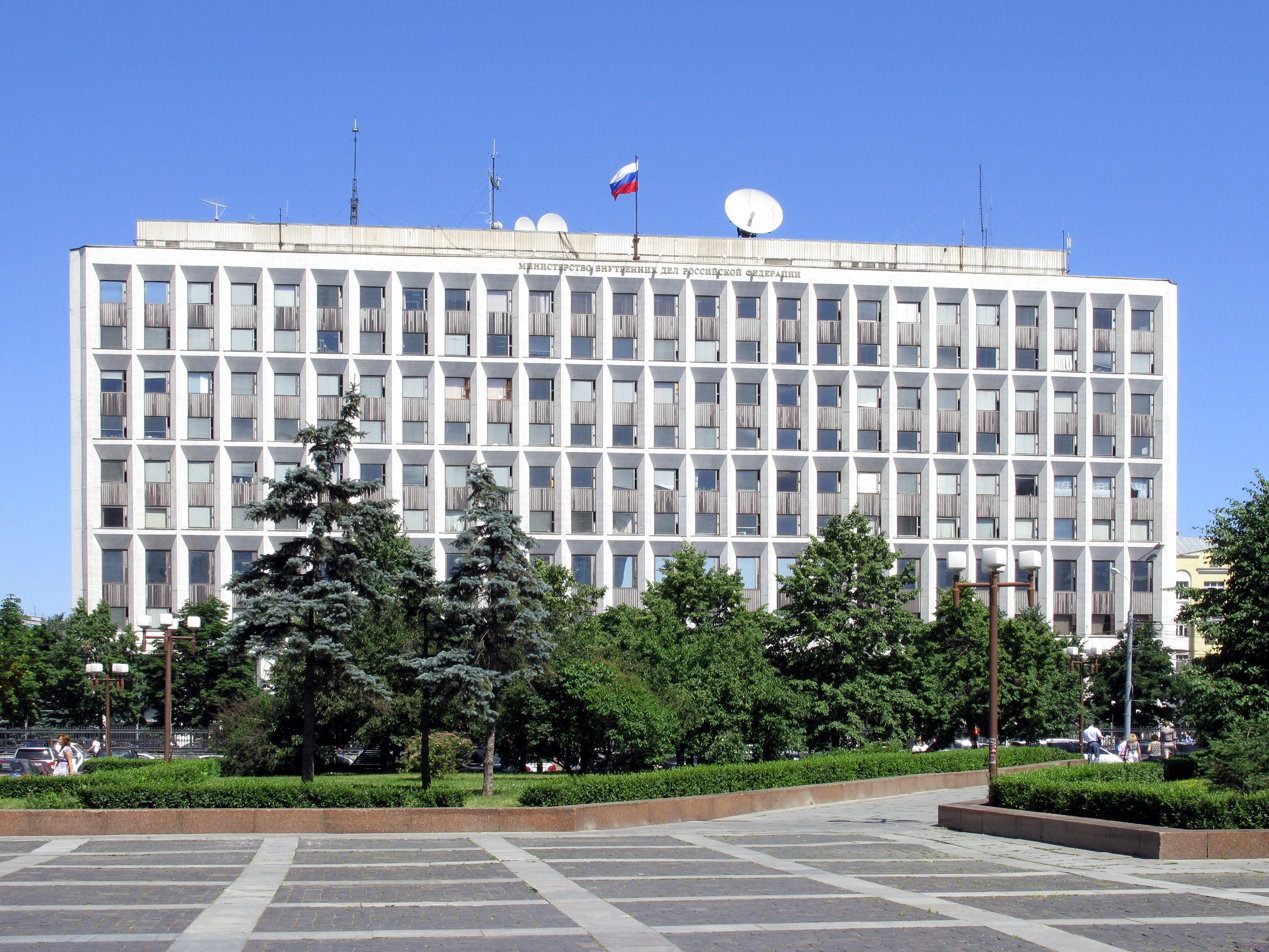
- Ministry headquarters in Moscow

Agency overview
- Formed: 8 September 1802
- Preceding agencies: Ministry of Internal Affairs of the Russian Empire (1802–1917); Ministry of Internal Affairs of the Russian Republic (1917); People's Commissariat for Internal Affairs of the Russian SFSR (1917-1946); Ministry of Internal Affairs of the Soviet Union (1946–1991)
- Jurisdiction: President of Russia
- Headquarters: Zhitnaya St. 16, Yakimanka, Moscow, Russia; 55°43′51″N 37°36′50″E
- Employees: 907,630 (2012)
- Annual budget: 1192.2 billion roubles (FY 2011)
- Minister responsible: Vladimir Kolokoltsev, Minister of Internal Affairs
- Child agencies: Police; Investigative Department; Organizational and Staff Department; Department of Records Management; Treaty and Legal Department; Control and Auditing Department; Department of Information Technologies; Department of Logistics; Department of Financial Policy; Organizational and Analytical Department; Forensic Expert Center; Bureau of Special Technical Measures; Cynological Support Center; International Cooperation Directorate; Public Relations Directorate
- Website: en.mvd.ru

The Ministry of Internal Affairs of the Russian Federation (Russian: Министерство внутренних дел, МВД, romanized: Ministerstvo vnutrennikh del, MVD) is the interior ministry of Russia.

The MVD is responsible for law enforcement in Russia through its agencies the Police of Russia, Migration Affairs, Drugs Control, Traffic Safety, the Centre for Combating Extremism, and the Investigative Department. The MVD is headquartered in Zhitnaya Street 16 in Yakimanka, Moscow. Vladimir Kolokoltsev has been the Minister of Internal Affairs since 2012.

== History ==
=== Russian Empire (1802–1917) ===
The first interior ministry (MVD) in Russia was created by Tsar Alexander I on 28 March 1802. The MVD was one of the most powerful governmental bodies of the Empire, responsible for the police forces and Internal Guards, and the supervision of gubernial administrations. Its initial responsibilities also included prisons, firefighting, state enterprises, the state postal system, state property, construction, roads, medicine, clergy, natural resources, and nobility; most of them were transferred to other ministries and government bodies by the mid-19th century.

==== Police ====
As the central government began to further partition the countryside, the ispravniks (chiefs of police) were distributed among the sections. Serving under them in their principal localities were commissaries (stanovoi pristav). Ispravniki and pristav alike were armed with broad and obscurely defined powers which, combined with the fact that they were for the most part illiterate and wholly ignorant of the law, formed crushing forces of oppression. Towards the end of the reign of Alexander II, the government, in order to preserve order in the country districts, also created a special class of mounted rural policemen (uryadniks, from uriad, order), who, in a time without habeas corpus, were armed with power to arrest all suspects on the spot. These uryadniks rapidly became the terror of the countryside. Finally, in the towns of the rural countryside, every house was provided with a "guard dog" of sorts, in the form of a porter (dvornik), who was charged with the duty of reporting the presence of any suspicious characters or anything of interest to the police.

==== Secret Police ====
In addition there was also the secret police, in direct subordination to the ministry of the interior, of which the principal function was the discovery, prevention, and extirpation of political sedition. Its most famous development was the so-called Third Section (of the imperial chancery) instituted by Emperor Nicholas I in 1826. This was entirely independent of the ordinary police, but was associated with the previously existing Special Corps of Gendarmes, whose chief was placed at its head. Its object had originally been to keep the emperor in close touch with all the branches of the administration and to bring to his notice any abuses and irregularities, and for this purpose its chief was in constant personal contact with the sovereign.

Following the growth of the revolutionary movement and the assassination of Emperor Alexander II, the Department of State Police inherited the secret police functions of the dismissed Third Section and transferred the most capable Gendarmes to the Okhrana. In 1896 the powers of the minister were extended at the expense of those of the under-secretary, who remained only at the head of the corps of gendarmes; but by a law of 24 September 1904 this was reversed, and the under-secretary was again placed at the head of all the police with the title of under-secretary for the administration of the police.

By World War I, the department had spawned a counter-intelligence section. After the February Revolution of 1917, the Gendarmes and the Okhrana were disbanded as anti-revolutionary.

=== Soviet era (1917–89) ===
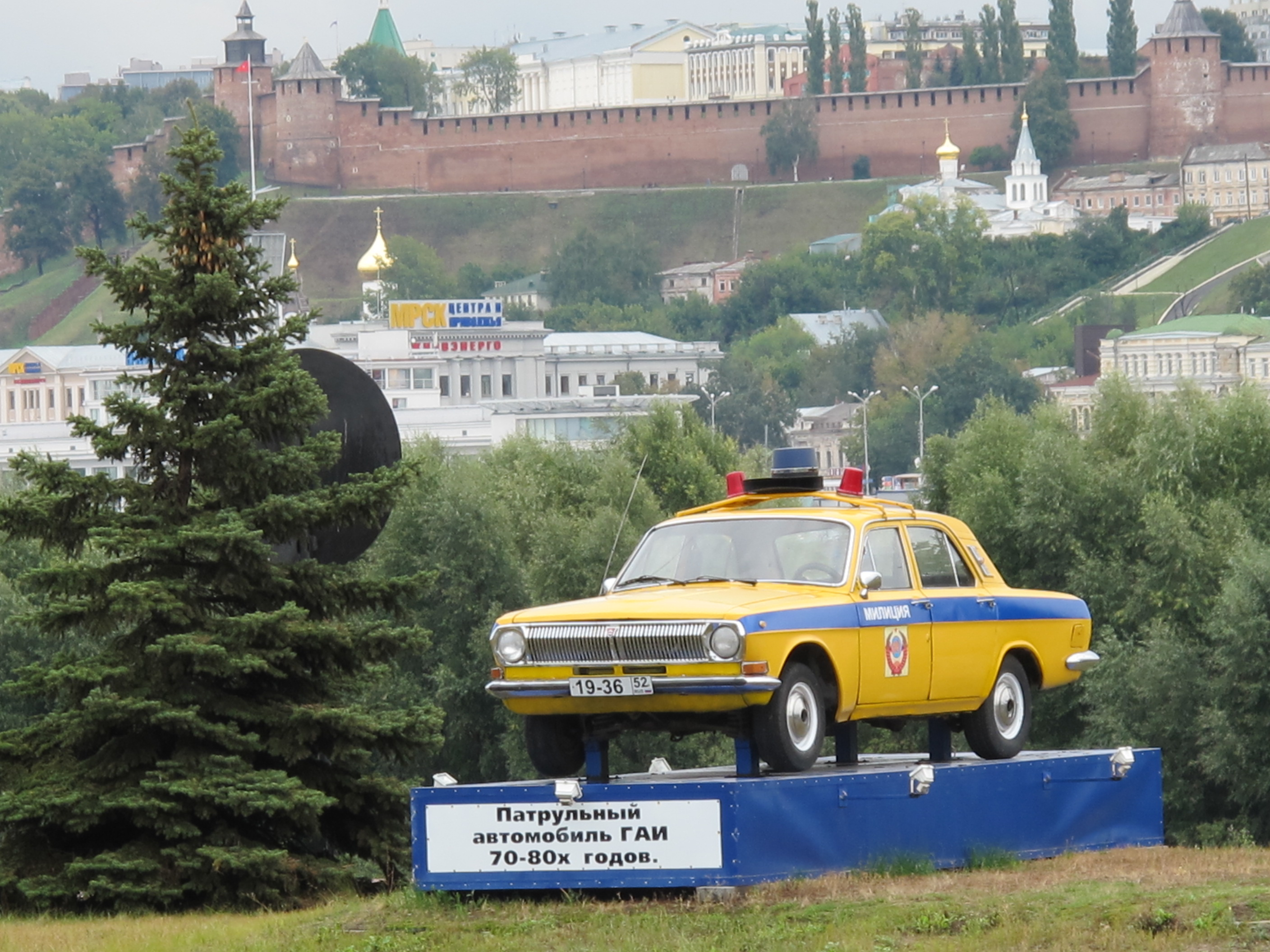
A 1970s- or 80s-vintage GAZ-24 Volga, in the period squad car livery, installed as a monument in front of the Nizhny Novgorod Main Directorate for Road Traffic Safety headquarters

Having won the October Revolution, the Bolsheviks disbanded the tsarist police forces and formed an all-proletarian Workers' and Peasants' Militsiya under the NKVD of the Russian SFSR. After the establishment of the USSR, there was no Soviet (federal) NKVD until 1934. In March 1946, all of the People's Commissariats (NK) were redesignated as Ministries (M). The NKVD was renamed the MVD of the USSR, along with its former subordinate, the NKGB which became the MGB of the USSR. The NKVDs of Union Republics also became Ministries of Internal Affairs subordinate to MVD of the USSR.

Secret police became a part of MVD after Lavrenty Beria merged the MGB into the MVD in March 1953. Within a year Beria's downfall caused the MVD to be split up again; after that, the MVD retained its "internal security" (police) functions, while the new KGB took on "state security" (secret police) functions.

In his efforts to fight bureaucracy and maintain 'Leninist principles', Nikita Khrushchev, as the Premier of the Soviet Union, called for the dismissal of the All-Union MVD. The Ministry ceased to exist in January 1960, and its functions were transferred to the respective Republican Ministries. The MVD of the Russian SFSR was renamed the Ministry for Securing the Public Order in 1962. Leonid Brezhnev again recreated the All-Union Ministry for Securing the Public Order in July 1966, and later assigned Nikolai Shchelokov as Minister; the RSFSR Ministry was disbanded for the second time, the first being at the creation of the NKVD of the Soviet Union. The MVD regained its original title in 1968. Another role of the reformed MVD was to combat economic crimes, that is, to suppress private business which was largely prohibited by socialist law. This fight was never successful, due to the pervasive nature of the black market.

By the mid-1980s, the image of the people's militsiya was largely compromised by the corruption and disorderly behaviour of both enlisted and officer staff (the most shocking case was the robbery and murder of a KGB operative by a group of militsiya officers stationed in the Moscow Metro in 1980).

=== Russian Federation (1990–present) ===
==== Organizational changes ====
The Russian MVD re-formed as the MVD of the Russian SFSR in 1990, following the restoration of the republican Russian Council of Ministers and the Supreme Soviet of Russia. It continued in its functions when Russia gained independence from the Soviet Union in 1991. As of 2017 the Ministry controlled: the Politsiya (formerly Militsiya), the General Administration for Traffic Safety, and the Federal Drug Control Service.

Since the disbanding of the Russian Tax Police Service in 2003, the MVD also investigates economic crimes. Two long-time units of the Imperial MVD and NKVD, the Russian Firefighting Service and the Federal Prisons Service, transferred to the Russian Ministry of Emergency Situations in 2001 and to the Russian Ministry of Justice in 2006, respectively. The last reorganization abolished Main Directorates inherited from the NKVD in favour of Departments. In 2012, career police officer Vladimir Kolokoltsev became the Minister of Internal Affairs in Russia.

On 5 April 2016, Russian President Vladimir Putin ordered the Russian Internal Troops, OMON (the Special Purpose Mobility Unit), and SOBR (SWAT) forces to form the basis of the newly created National Guard of Russia, and these close to 200,000 public order, special police, and internal troop forces previously under the command of the MVD were reassigned to the Security Council of Russia. In turn and on the same day, the Federal Drug Control Service and the Federal Migration Service merged into the MVD, and are now known as the Main Directorate for Drugs Control and the Main Directorate for Migration Affairs, respectively.

==== 2005–19 ====
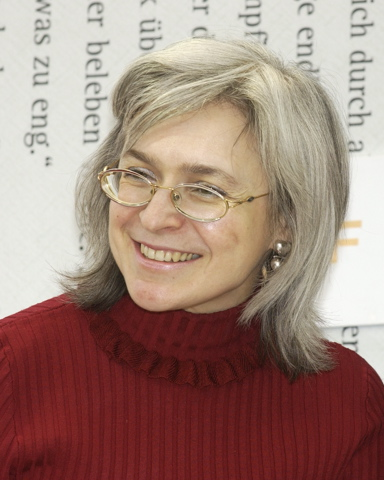
Anna Politkovskaya

In 2006, investigative journalist Anna Politkovskaya was murdered. Six years later, the former head of surveillance at Moscow's main Internal Affairs Directorate was found guilty of organizing her murder by tracking her movements and giving a gun to the killer.

In December 2019, Distributed Denial of Secrets listed a leak from Russia's Ministry of the Interior, portions of which detailed the deployment of Russian troops to Ukraine, at a time when the Kremlin was denying a military presence there. Some material from that leak was published in 2014, about half of it was not, and WikiLeaks reportedly rejected a request to host the files two years later, at a time when Julian Assange was focused on exposing Democratic Party documents passed to WikiLeaks by Kremlin hackers.

==== 2020–present ====
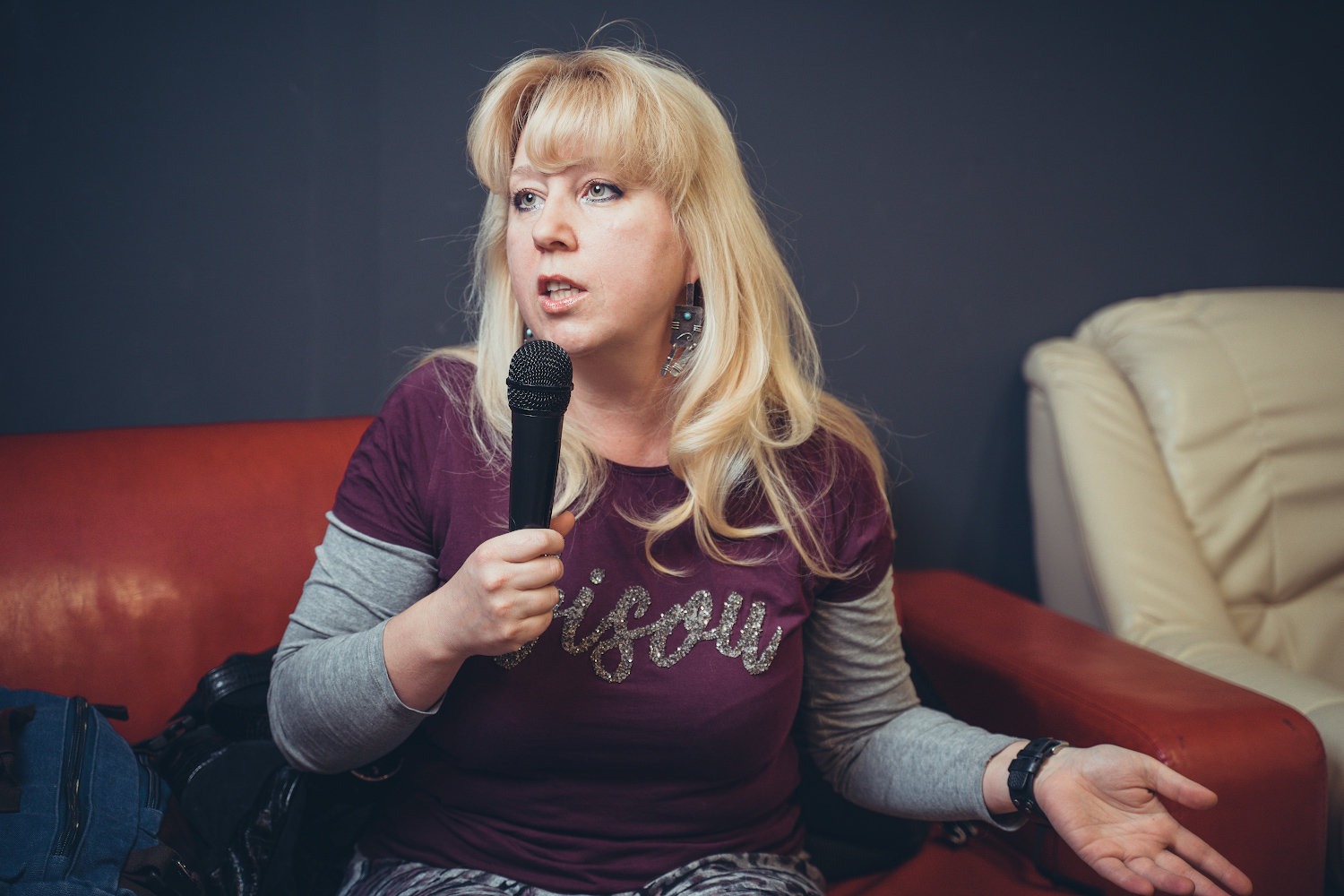
Irina Slavina

The founder and editor of the independent news site Koza.Press, known professionally as Irina Slavina, was harassed by law enforcement for years. On October 2, 2020, she committed suicide by self-immolation outside a regional Ministry of Internal Affairs building, writing on Facebook, "For my death, please blame the Russian Federation."

In September 2023, Russia's Ministry of Internal Affairs decided to have an appeal by imprisoned opposition leader Alexei Navalny challenging his 19-year prison sentence on extremism charges held by a court behind closed doors, and the appeal was dismissed. Supporters of Navalny said he was being silenced for criticizing President Vladimir Putin's government. In 2020 Navalny was poisoned in Russia with the Soviet-era nerve agent Novichok.

Telecommunications service providers are required to grant the Ministry of Internal Affairs 24-hour remote access to their client databases, including telephone and electronic communication and records, enabling the Ministry to track private communications and internet activity without the users' knowledge. The law permits authorities to monitor telephone calls in real time.

== Ministers ==
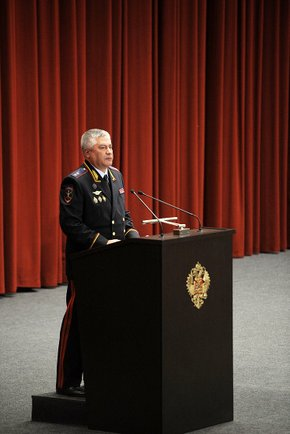
Current Minister of Internal Affairs Vladimir Kolokoltsev

Interior ministers
Minister	Start year	End year
Viktor Yerin	1992	1995
Anatoly Kulikov	1995	1998
Sergei Stepashin	1998	1999
Vladimir Rushailo	1999	2001
Boris Gryzlov	2001	2003
Rashid Nurgaliyev	2004	2012
Vladimir Kolokoltsev	2012	

== See also ==
- Awards of the Ministry of Internal Affairs of Russia
- Crimea Police
- List of interior ministers of Russia
- Ministry of Police of Imperial Russia
- Military of Russia
- Militsiya
- Moscow Police
- MVD Ensemble
- Nizhny Novgorod Oblast Police
- Primorsky Krai Police
- Saint Petersburg Police
- Sevastopol Police
- Sochi Police

=== Sports ===
- Former HC MVD of the KHL
