= Police of Russia =

Federal law enforcement agency

Police of Russia Полиция России
- Patch of the Police of Russia

- Emblem of the Police of Russia

- Badge of the Police of Russia

- Flag of the Police of Russia
- Common name: Police of Russia
- Abbreviation: Russian Police
- Motto: Служим России, служим закону! (We serve Russia, we serve the law!)

Agency overview
- Formed: June 7, [O.S. 18] 1718
- Preceding agencies: Militsiya; Police Department of Russia
- Employees: 900,000 (2023)

Jurisdictional structure
- National agency (Operations jurisdiction): RUS
- Federal agency (Operations jurisdiction): RUS
- Operations jurisdiction: RUS
- Map of the Russian federal districts from 2014 to 2026
- Area: 17,075,400 km^{2} (6,592,800 sq mi)
- Population: 143,030,106
- Legal jurisdiction: Federal law "On Police"
- Governing body: Ministry of Internal Affairs
- Constituting instrument: Law "On Police"
- General nature: Federal law enforcement; Civilian police

Operational structure
- Overseen by: State Duma's Security Committee
- Headquarters: Zhitnaya 6, Okhotny Ryad, Moscow
- Appointment by the President of Russia responsible: Vladimir Kolokoltsev, Minister of the Internal Affairs
- Parent agency: Ministry of the Internal Affairs
- Child agencies: Patrol police; Traffic police; Criminal police; Transport police; Migration Service; Drug Control; Economic Security; Centre "E"; Internal Security; Operational Response; Personnel Work; Interpol NCB; Cyber Police; State Protection; Event Security; Search Bureau; Inquiry Organization

Notables
- Anniversary: November 10, 1918

Website
- en.mvd.ru

The Police of Russia (Russian: Полиция России, romanized: Politsiya Rossii) is the national law enforcement agency of Russia, operating under the Ministry of Internal Affairs from September 8, [O.S. 20] 1802. It was established on June 7, [O.S. 18] 1718 by decree of Peter the Great, and in 2011, it replaced the Militsiya, the former police service.

The Police of Russia operates according to the law "On police" (закон «О полиции»), as approved by the Federal Assembly, and subsequently signed into law on February 7, 2011, by the then President of the Russian Federation, Dmitry Medvedev.

== History ==
The system was created in order to protect public order and fight against crime in the Russian Empire. It was reorganized on March 1, 2011, under the Russian Federation, except for existing structures not related to the Ministry of Internal Affairs.

=== 16th century ===
In 1504, defensive obstacles called cheval de frise were installed in Moscow, under which guards drawn from the local population were stationed. The city was divided into areas, with latticed gates separating them.

It was forbidden to move around the city at night, or without lighting. Subsequently, the Grand Prince Ivan IV established patrols around Moscow for increased security.

The Sudebnik of Ivan IV transferred the cases "on guided robbers" to be under the jurisdiction of honorary elders. Before this, the Letters of Honor were awarded based on a petition of the population. These letters permitted local towns to independently manage police work. In cities, police functions were guided by the mayor.

The Robber Administration was first mentioned in 1571, and existed continuously until the 18th century. Written sources from Moscow have mentioned the boyars and organized robbery since 1539.

Konstantin Nevolin believed that the Robber Administration was a temporary commission established to end the robberies. However, since the robberies only intensified, the temporary commission turned into a standing committee.

=== 17th century ===
By a decree on August 14, 1687, the affairs of the Robber Administration were transferred to the Zemsky Administration. In April 1649, Grand Prince Alexis issued a Decree on urban policing.

By this decree, in the White City (now known as Belgorod), a team was to be created under the leadership of Ivan Novikov and podyachy Vikula Panov. The detachment was supposed to maintain safety and order, as well as protect against fire.

They were later betrayed by five lattice clerks and "one person from 10 yards" with roars, axes, and water pipes.

Police officers in large cities were called Zemsky Yaryg. The color of the uniforms varied between cities. In Moscow, officers were dressed in red and green clothes. On the chest, they had the letters "З" (Z) and "Я" (YA) sewn.

In 1669, detectives universally replaced the role of honorary elders.

=== 18th century ===
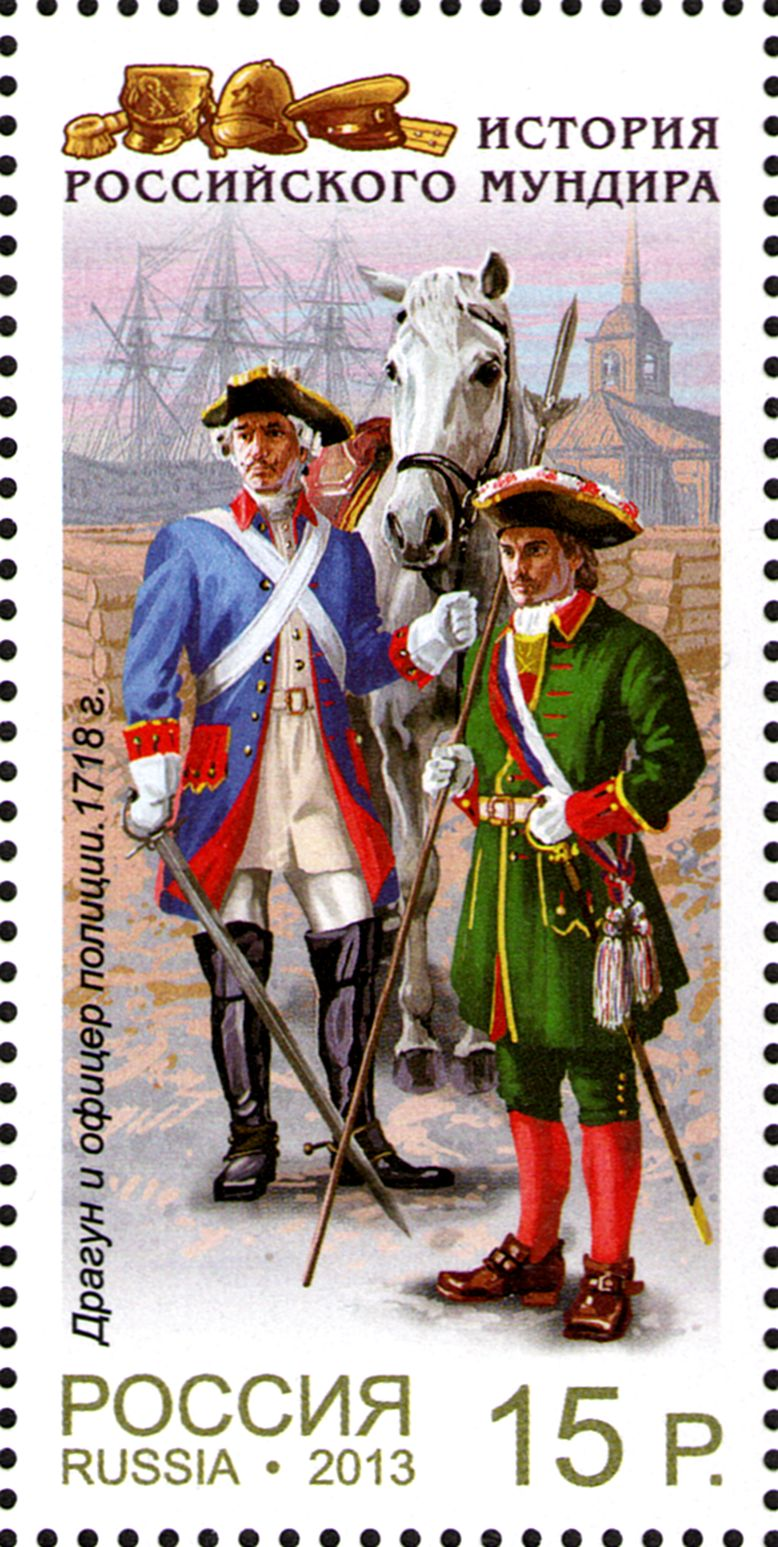
Dragoon (left) and a police officer. 1718. Postage stamp Russia 2013.

The police force in Saint Petersburg was established as the Main Police in 1715 by decree of Peter the Great.

Initially, the staff of the Saint Petersburg police consisted of the deputy general police chief, 4 officers, and 36 lower ranks. A diak and ten podyachys kept office work in the Main Police Station Office.

The police not only kept order in the city, but also carried out several economic functions and were engaged in the improvement of the city, such as paving streets, draining swampy places, and garbage collection.

On June 7, 1718, Adjutant General Anton de Vieira was appointed General Polizeimeister. To aid him in completing work, the Chief Police Office was created and one army regiment was transferred to the authority of the General Polizeimeister. All the ranks of this regiment became police officers.

In 1721, through the efforts of General de Vieira, the first lanterns and benches were installed in St. Petersburg.

On January 19, 1722, the Governing Senate established the Moscow Police. The Ober-Polizeimeister was to be appointed by the emperor from military or civilian ranks.

By the instructions of July 20, 1722, the Ober-Polizeimeister supervised the protection of public peace in Moscow as head of the Moscow Police Office. Between 1729–1731 and 1762–1764, the head of the Moscow police was called the General Polizeimeister.

On April 23, 1733, Empress Anna signed a decree that gave the police legal powers, and allowed them the right to impose penalties in criminal cases.

=== 19th and 20th century ===
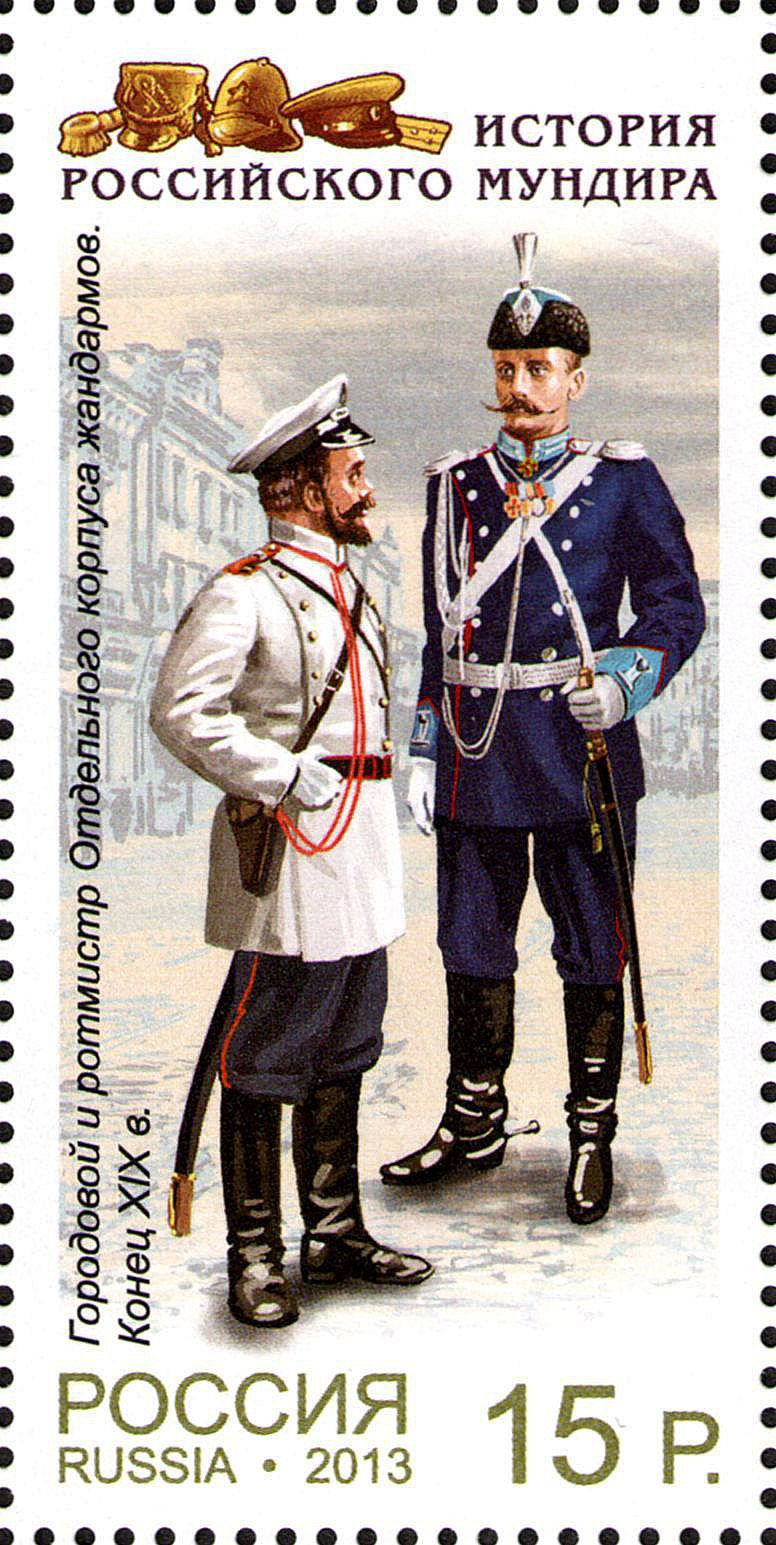
The uniform of the policeman and captain of the Special Corps of Gendarmes at the end of the 19th century. Russian postage stamp 2013.

In 1837, a regulation on the zemstvo police was issued saying that the zemstvo police chief elected by the nobility became the head of the police in the uyezd.

The police officers appointed by the provincial government reported to the governor, and in turn the county or uedz police were responsible to county leaders appointed by the provincial government.

In 1862, a police reform was carried out. The title of mayor was abolished; city councils in those cities that were subordinate to the district police were attached to the zemstvo courts. District police departments were renamed, and in those cities that retained their own police separate from the district police, they were renamed into city police departments.

In 1866, a zemstvo guard was established in the districts of the Kingdom of Poland.

In 1866, St. Petersburg Chief of Police Fyodor Trepov sent a note to Alexander II, which said:

"A significant gap in the institution of the metropolitan police was the absence of a special part with the special purpose of conducting research for solving crimes, finding general measures to prevent and suppress crimes. These responsibilities lay with the ranks of the external police, which, bearing the entire burden of the police service, had neither the means nor the opportunity to act successfully in this respect. To eliminate this deficiency, it was proposed to establish a detective police".

For the first time in the Russian police, specialized units for solving crimes and conducting inquiries were created in St. Petersburg. In 1866, a detective police force was established under the office of the city police chief.

Prior to that, detective functions were carried out by forensic investigators, as well as the entire police department. Initially, the criminal investigation staff of St. Petersburg was small.

At the time of its founding, the department consisted of, in addition to the chief and his assistant, 4 officials at special assignments, 12 police detectives, and 20 civilian detectives.

The Detective Department was founded in 1866, operating under the Police Department of Ministry of Internal Affairs, and by 1907, similar departments had been created in other major cities of the Russian Empire, including Moscow, Kiev, Riga, Odesa, Tiflis, Baku, Rostov-on-Don and Nizhny Novgorod. Other districts were policed by rural police or gendarmerie units.

In 1879, the institute of police officers in rural areas was formed. The institute was intended to help the police officers for the performance of police duties, as well as for the supervision of the centurions and foremen.

On August 6, 1880, the Third Section of His Imperial Majesty's Own Chancellery was abolished, and the Police Department was formed.

Since 1889, the Chief of the District Police began to be called the District Police Officer.

In 1903, a district police guard was originally introduced in 46 provinces. By 1916, it extended to 50 provinces.

On August 9, 1910, the Minister of Internal Affairs Pyotr Stolypin issued an instruction to the officers of the detective departments, which determined their tasks and structure. Each detective department consisted of four structural divisional desks: personal detention, searches, observations, and the information registration office.

By order of Stolypin, at the Police Department, special courses were established to train the heads of detective departments. At the International Congress of Criminalists, held in Switzerland in 1913, the Russian detective police were recognized as the best in the world in solving crimes.

The then 3,500-strong police force of Petrograd provided the main opposition to the rioting, which marked the initial outbreak of the February Revolution.

After the army units garrisoning the city defected, the police became the main target of the revolutionaries, and many were killed. The Police of the Russian Empire was dissolved on March 10, 1917, and on April 17, the Provisional Government established the People's Militia (Militsiya) as a new law enforcement body.

=== Soviet and Russian Militsiya ===
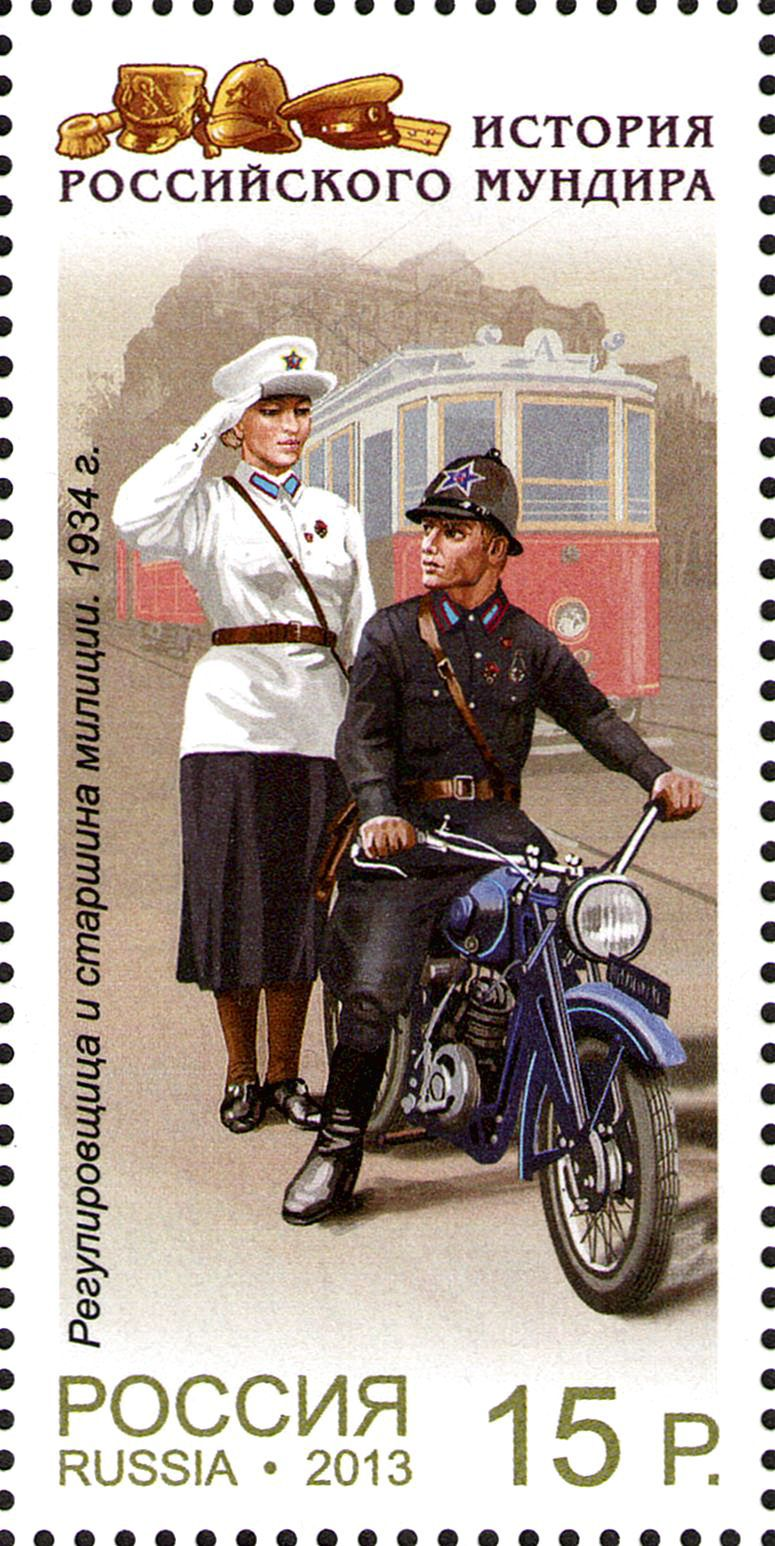
The traffic controller and the starchina of the militsia. 1934 year. Postage stamp from Russia. year 2013

Following decisions of the Provisional Government "On the approval of the militsiya" and "Temporary regulations on the police", issued on April 17, 1917, the "people's militia" was established. The people's militia was declared to be the executive body of state power at the local level, directly under the jurisdiction of the zemstvo and city public administrations.

Simultaneously with the state militsiya, the councils of workers' deputies organized detachments of "workers' militsiya" and other armed formations, which were under the influence of various political forces, and sometimes outside them.

At the same time, the workers' militsiya was not subordinate to the commissars of the city militsiya.

The Council of the Petrograd People's militsiya, formed on June 3 under the auspices of the Bolsheviks, came into conflict with the head of the city militsiya, issuing political slogans in connection with the refusal to pay additional payments for service in the workers' militsiya to workers receiving full wages in factories.

The principle of self-organization of the forces of law and order was implemented by the Bolshevik Party for some time after October 1917. The decree of the NKVD "On the workers' militia" of October 28, 1917 did not provide for the organizational forms of the state militia apparatus.

The workers' militsiya bore the character of mass amateur organizations, and was formed on the basis of voluntary squads, so it could not stop the rampant crime.

On May 10, 1918, the Collegium of the NKVD adopted an order:

"The police exist as a permanent staff of persons performing special duties, the organization of the police should be carried out independently of the Red Army, their functions should be strictly delimited."

The militsiya was formed on March 10, 1917, replacing the former Russian police organizations of the Imperial government. There were detachments of the people's militsiya and the workers' militsiya that were organized as paramilitary police units. After the dissolution of the Soviet Union, the militsiya continued to exist in Russia until March 1, 2011.

=== 2011 Police reform ===
Initiated by former President Dmitry Medvedev, Russian police reforms are an ongoing effort to improve the efficiency of Russia's police forces, decrease corruption, and improve the public image of law enforcement.

On February 7, 2011, amendments were made to the laws of the police force, the criminal code, and the criminal procedure code.

The amendments came into force on March 1, 2011. These changes stipulate a law enforcement personnel cut of 20%, renaming Russian law enforcers from "militsiya" (militia) to "politsiya" (police), substantial increases in wages, centralization of financing, and several other changes.

Around 217 billion rubles ($7 billion) have been allocated from the federal budget to finance the reform.

==== Main changes and aims of the reform ====
Under the reform, the name of Russian law enforcers was changed from the Soviet-era term "militsiya" (militia) to the more universal "politsiya" (police) on March 1, 2011. The number of police officers was reduced by 20%, dropping from 1.28 million to 1.1 million by 2012.

This reduction was accomplished via a comprehensive evaluation of all officers. All evaluations occurred during or before June 2011, and those who failed the evaluation lost their jobs. For those officers surviving the reduction, salaries were increased by 30%.

As a result of the reform, the Russian police was centralized as a federal-level institution, with funding fully sourced from the federal budget. This differs from the old system, where police units responsible for public order and petty crimes were under the jurisdiction of regional and city authorities, financed from regional budgets, and were tied closer to regional governors rather than the central federal government.

According to the new law, detainees will receive the right to make a telephone call within 3 hours of their detention. They will also receive the right to have a lawyer and interpreter from the moment of their detention, and police must inform the detainee of their rights and duties. The police no longer have the right to carry out and demand checks of a company's financial and business activities. Police may also no longer detain a citizen for an hour just to verify his/her identity.

Thus, on August 7, 2010, a new bill for the law "On police" was proposed (the same bill with the changed names "militsiya" to "police").

The new bill is a continuation of the opposite policy of the reform of 2002, with the goal being increased centralization. Institutions of the public security militsiya and criminal militsiya are being abolished. Unlike the militsiya, which are partially subordinate to the authority of the subject of the federation, the police are not connected with the subject of the federation (according to the bill).

About 5 million people took part in the online discussion of the draft law "On police". As a result, the draft law, in comparison with the initial form, underwent significant changes related to the powers of the new structure.

In particular, the provisions that police officers can freely enter the premises of citizens, land plots belonging to them, on territories, land plots and premises occupied by public associations and organizations, as well as the "presumption of legality" of the police, caused the most criticism

"The police officer’s demands addressed to citizens and officials and the actions taken by him are considered legal until otherwise established in the manner prescribed by law."

Although according to opposition politicians, this wording was only veiled, and not excluded.

Despite criticism from certain segments of society and a number of opposition political parties, the draft law was adopted in the first reading on December 10, 2010.

The State Duma on Friday, January 28, 2011, adopted the draft law "On police" in the final third reading. Only 315 deputies voted for the adoption of the law, 130 were against, there were no abstentions.

It was originally planned that the new law would come into force in January 2011, but the police in Russia officially revived on March 1, 2011.

On February 7, 2011, the President tweeted a message:

Dmitry Medvedev
(@MedvedevRussia)
tweeted:

Russian:

Подписал закон о полиции. Спасибо всем, кто участвовал в обсуждении этого важного документа. Закон — первый шаг к обновлению МВД.

Translation:

I've signed the Law on police. Thanks to everyone who participated in the discussion of this important document. The law is the first step towards updating the Ministry of Internal Affairs.

7 February 2011

On March 1, 2011, the Police Act entered into force, and as of January 1, 2012, all symbols of the Militsiya became invalid.

== Insignia ==
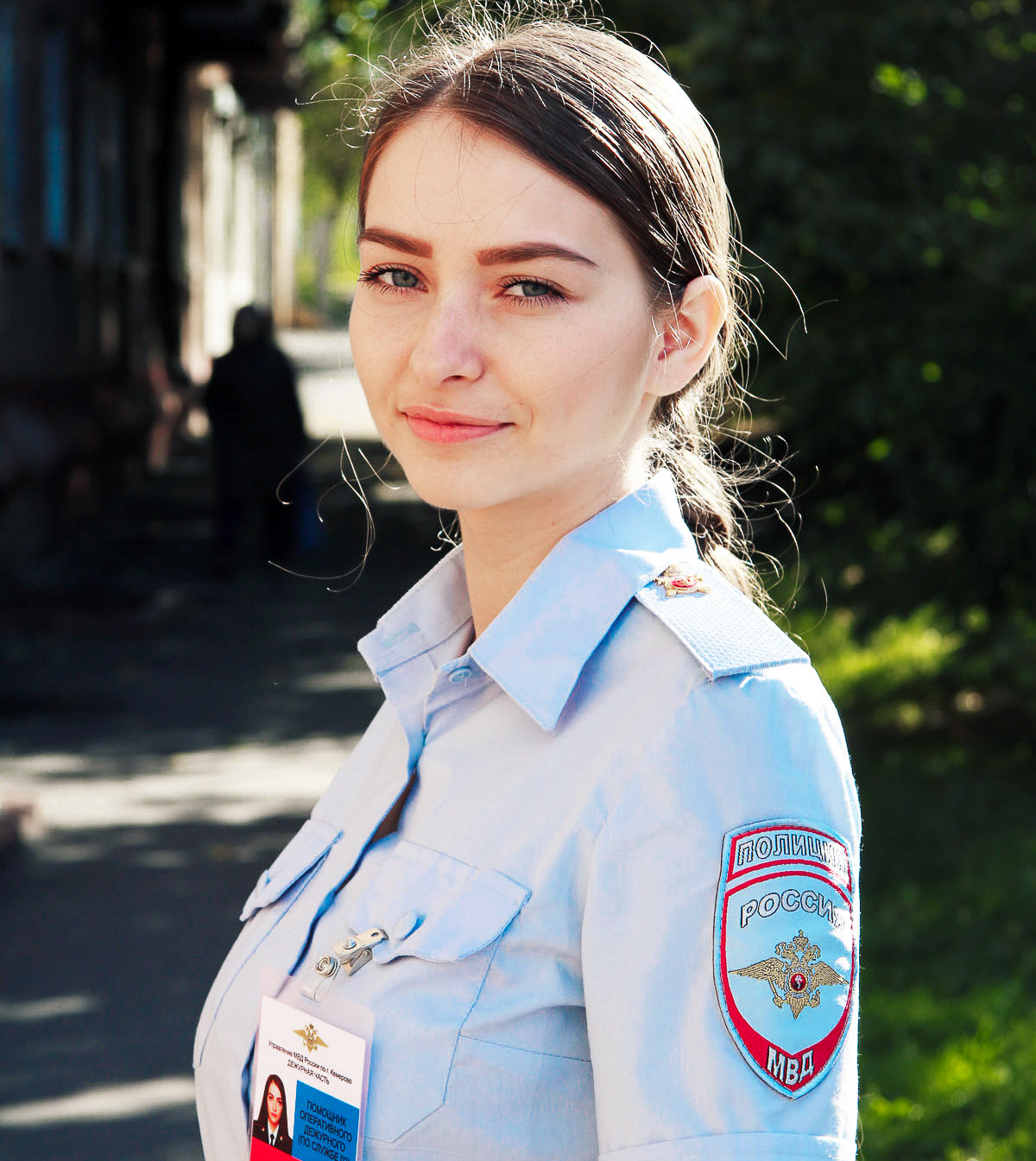
A Russian policewoman

Russian Police officers wear uniforms in accordance with the order of the Ministry of Internal Affairs of the Russian Federation of July 26, 2013 N 575 "On approval of the Rules for the wearing of uniforms, insignia and departmental insignia by employees of the internal affairs bodies of the Russian Federation".

The insignia of special distinction of the officers of the operational regiments of the Russian police is a black beret.

Employees of the tourist police wear a sleeve sign with the words "ТУРИСТИЧЕСКАЯ ПОЛИЦИЯ TOURIST POLICE", and the flag of Russia.

Patch of affiliation to the Ministry of Internal Affairs of Russia

Patrol Police Patch

Traffic Police Patch

Transport Police Patch

=== Police ranks ===
Officers

| Rank group | General / flag officers | | | | Senior officers | | | Junior officers |
|---|---|---|---|---|---|---|---|---|---|---|---|---|
| Police of Russia |
| Russian name | Генерал полиции Российской Федерации | Генерал-полковник полиции | Генера́л-лейтена́нт полиции | Генера́л-майо́р полиции | Полко́вник полиции | Подполко́вник полиции | Майо́р полиции | Kапита́н полиции | Старший лейтена́нт полиции | Лейтенант полиции | Mла́дший лейтена́нт полиции | Курсант полиции |
| Transcript | General politsii Rossiyskoy Federatsii | Generál-polkóvnik politsii | Generál-leytenánt politsii | Generál-mayór politsii | Polkóvnik politsii | Podpolkóvnik politsii | Majór politsii | Kapitán politsii | Stárshiy leytenánt politsii | Leytenant politsii | Mládshiy leytenánt politsii | Kursant politsii |
| English name or analog | Senior Police General | Police General | Police Lieutenant General | Police Major General | Police Colonel | Police Lieutenant Colonel | Police Major | Police Captain | Police Senior Lieutenant | Police Lieutenant | Police Junior Lieutenant | Police Cadet |

Other ranks

| Rank group | Warrant officers | | Sergeants | | | | Enlisted |
|---|---|---|---|---|---|---|---|
| Police of Russia |
| Russian name | Старший прапорщик полиции | Прапорщик полиции | Старшина полиции | Старший сержант полиции | Сержант полиции | Младший сержант полиции | Рядовой полиции |
| Transcript | Starshiy praporshchik politsii | Praporshchik politsii | Starshina politsii | Starshiy serzhant politsii | Serzhant politsii | Mladshiy serzhant politsii | Ryadovoy politsii |
| English name or analog | Police Senior Warrant Officer | Police Warrant Officer | Police First Sergeant | Police Senior Sergeant | Police Sergeant | Police Junior Sergeant | Police Private |

== Central administration ==
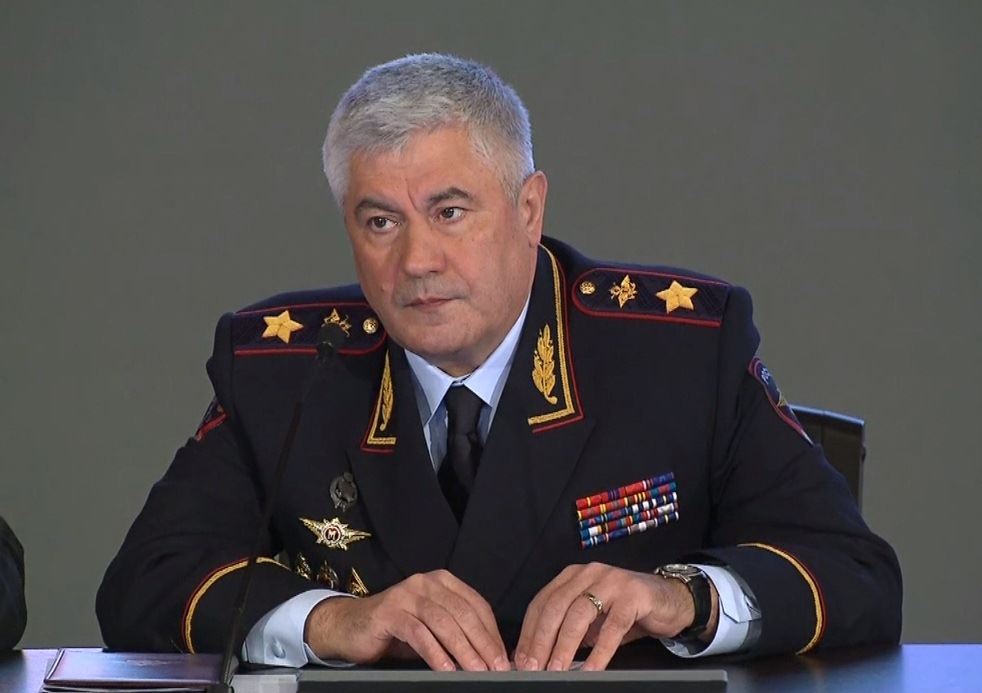
Vladimir Kolokoltsev, Russian Minister of Internal Affairs.

1. Criminal Police Service: Criminal Investigations Department (Russian: Уголовный розыск)
  - Main Office for Criminal Investigation
  - Main Directorate for Public Order Maintenance (Patrol police) (Russian: Главное управление по обеспечению охраны общественного порядка)
  - Main Directorate for Road Traffic Safety (Traffic police) (Russian: Государственная инспекция безопасности дорожного движения)
  - Main Office for Combating Economic and Tax Crimes (Russian:Отдел борьбы с экономическими преступлениями)
  - Office for Operational Investigation Information
  - Co-ordination Office of Criminal Police Service
  - Main Office of the Interior for Transport
  - Office for Crisis Situations
  - Office for Resource Provisions
  - Finance and Economy Office
2. Logistical Service
  - Office for Material and Technical Support
  - Co-ordination Office of Logistical Service
  - Medical Office
  - Finance and Economy Department
  - Office for Communication and Automation
  - Office for Capital Construction
  - General Services Office
3. Independent Divisions
  - Main Office for Internal Security (Russian: Главное управление собственной безопасности МВД России)
  - Investigative Office (Russian: Следственное управление)
  - Main office for Drug Enforcement (former Federal Drug Control Service of Russia) (Russian: Главное управление по контролю за оборотом наркотиков)
  - Service for Citizenship and Registration of Foreign Citizens (former Federal Migratory Service) (Russian: Главное управление по вопросам миграции)
  - Control and Auditing Office
  - Forensic Expertise Center
  - National Central Bureau for Interpol
  - Mobilization Training Office
  - Main Center for Information
  - Main Legal Office
  - Office for International Co-operation
  - Office for Information Regional Contacts

== Equipment ==
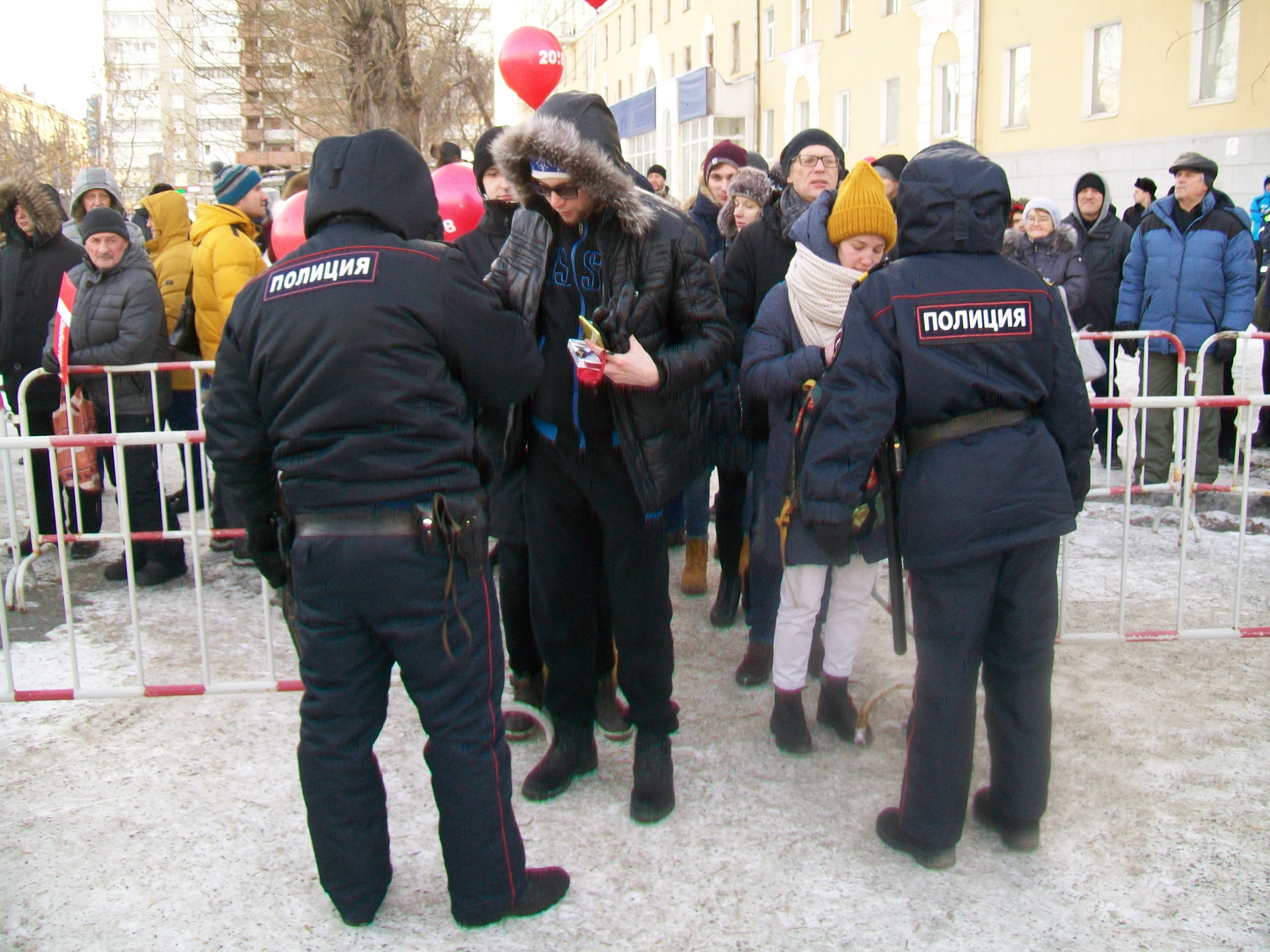
Two police officers doing an inspection in Yekaterinburg, 2018

=== Transportation ===
The Russian Police use a number of different models of automobiles which range greatly in age and technical specification.

=== Patrol Cars ===
- Lada Priora
- Lada Samara 2
- Lada Granta
- Lada Vesta
- Lada XRAY
- Audi A6
- BMW 5 Series
- Daewoo Nexia
- Fiat Albea
- Fiat Linea
- Fiat Bravo (2007)
- Fiat Doblò
- Ford Explorer
- Ford Focus
- Ford Kuga
- Ford Mondeo
- Honda Accord
- Hyundai i40
- Hyundai Solaris
- Hyundai Sonata
- Kia Rio
- Mitsubishi Pajero
- Nissan Almera
- Nissan Almera Classic
- Nissan Teana
- Opel Astra
- Renault Logan
- Volkswagen Passat
- Skoda Octavia
- Skoda Rapid
- Volkswagen Polo
- Toyota Camry
- Toyota Corolla
- Toyota Land Cruiser 200
- Kia Sorento
- Land Rover Defender
- Mercedes-Benz C-Class
- Mercedes-Benz E-Class
- Mercedes-Benz G-Class
- Mercedes-Benz GLK-Class
- Audi R8

=== Vans ===
- GAZelle
- UAZ-452
- GAZ-3302
- Fiat Ducato
- Ford Transit

=== All Terrain Vehicles ===
- Lada Niva (and Chevrolet Niva)
- UAZ-469
- UAZ Patriot

=== Armoured vehicles & Tanks ===
- GAZ-2975 "Tigr"
- BPM-97
- BMP-2
- BTR-80
- BTR-82A
- KAMAZ TYPHOON

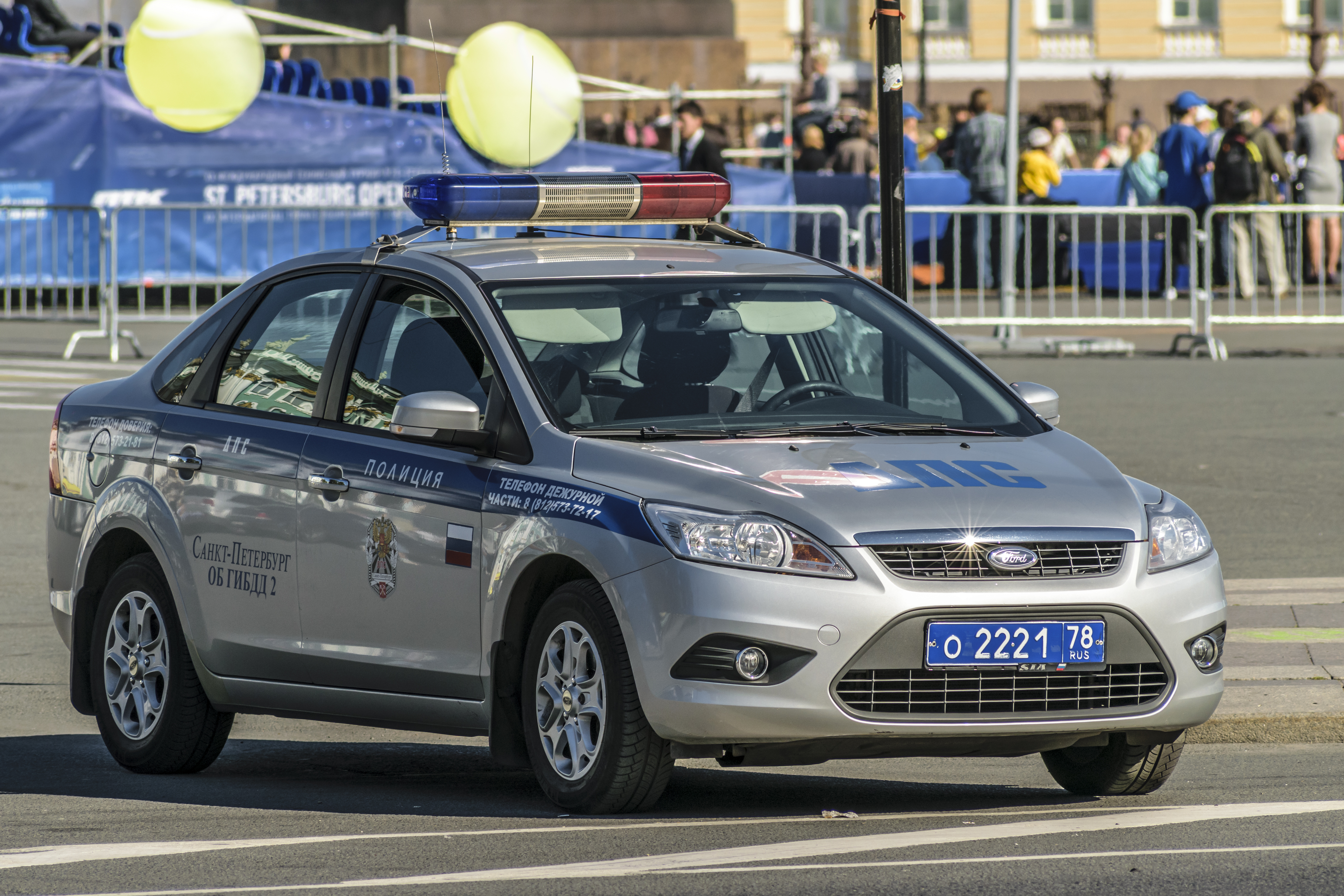
A Ford Focus of the Saint Petersburg Police

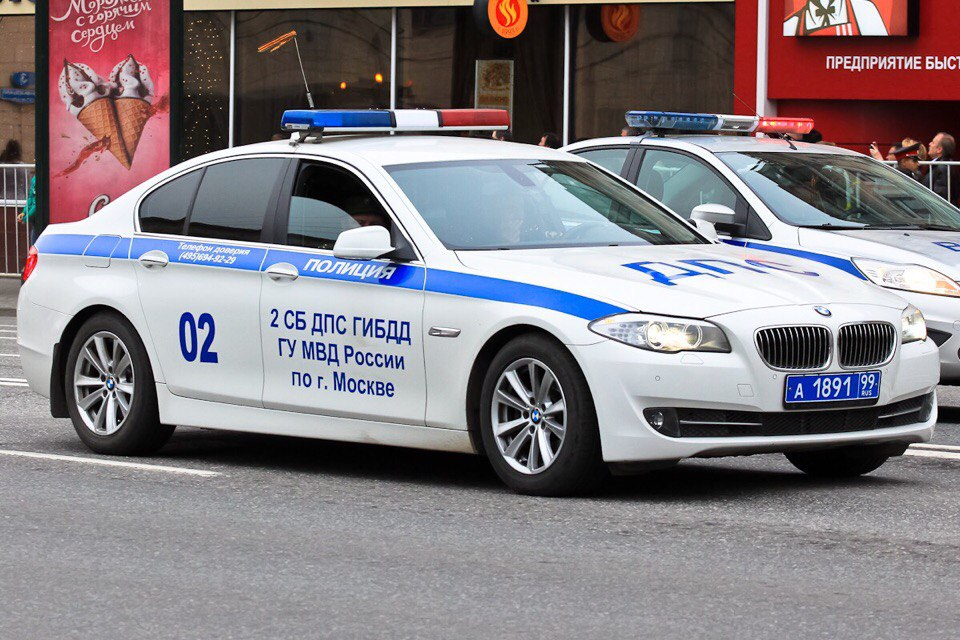
A BMW 5 Series of the Moscow City Police

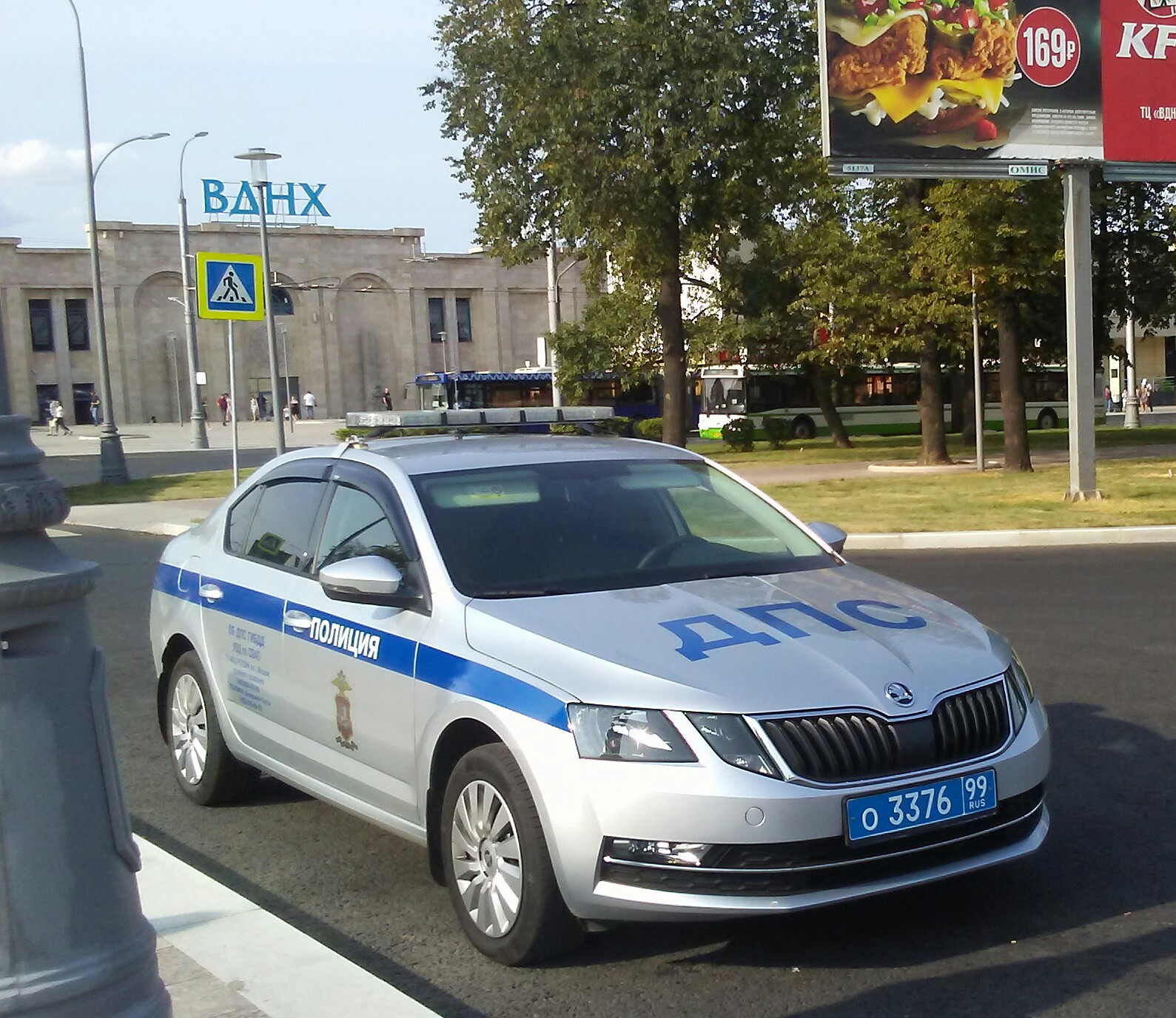
Škoda Octavia

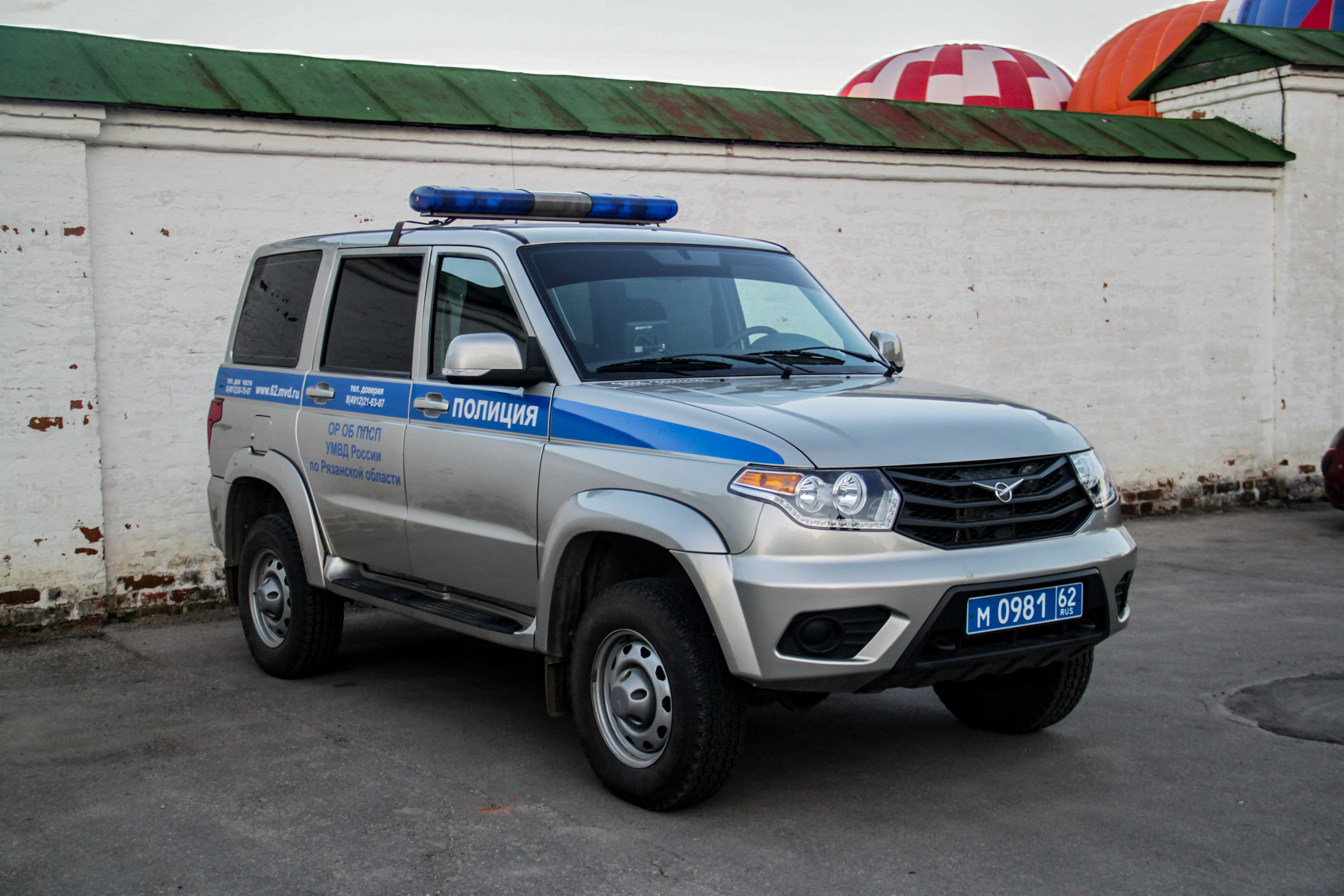
UAZ Patriot Sport

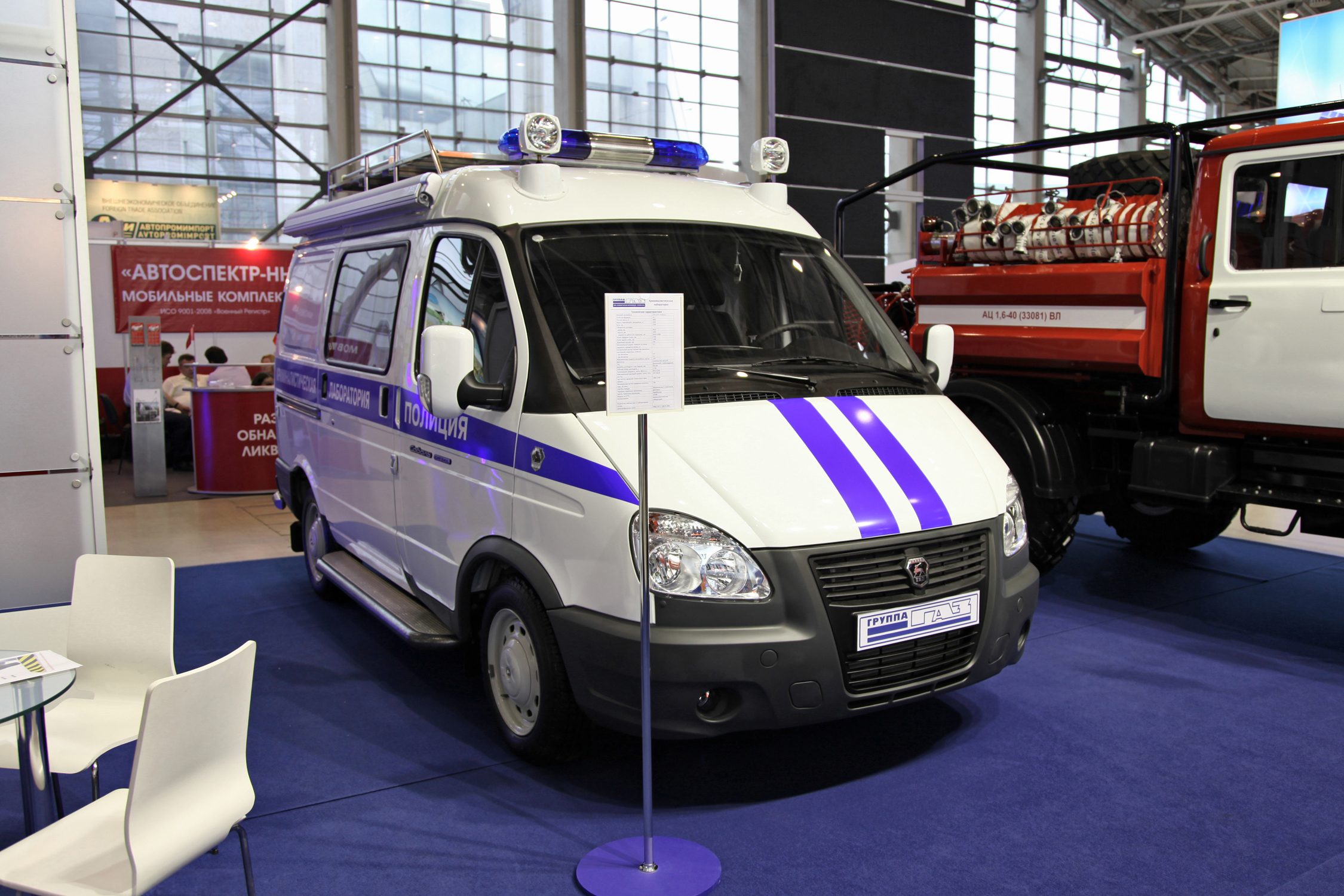
GAZelle van

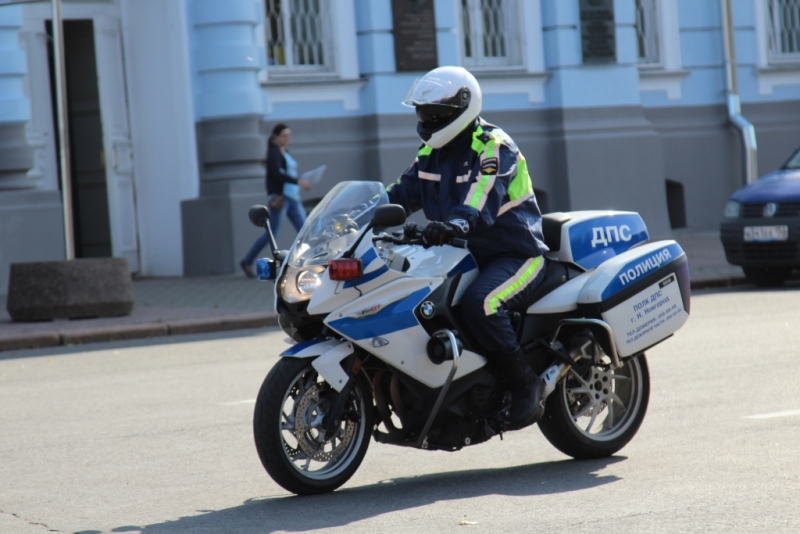
BMW F800GT

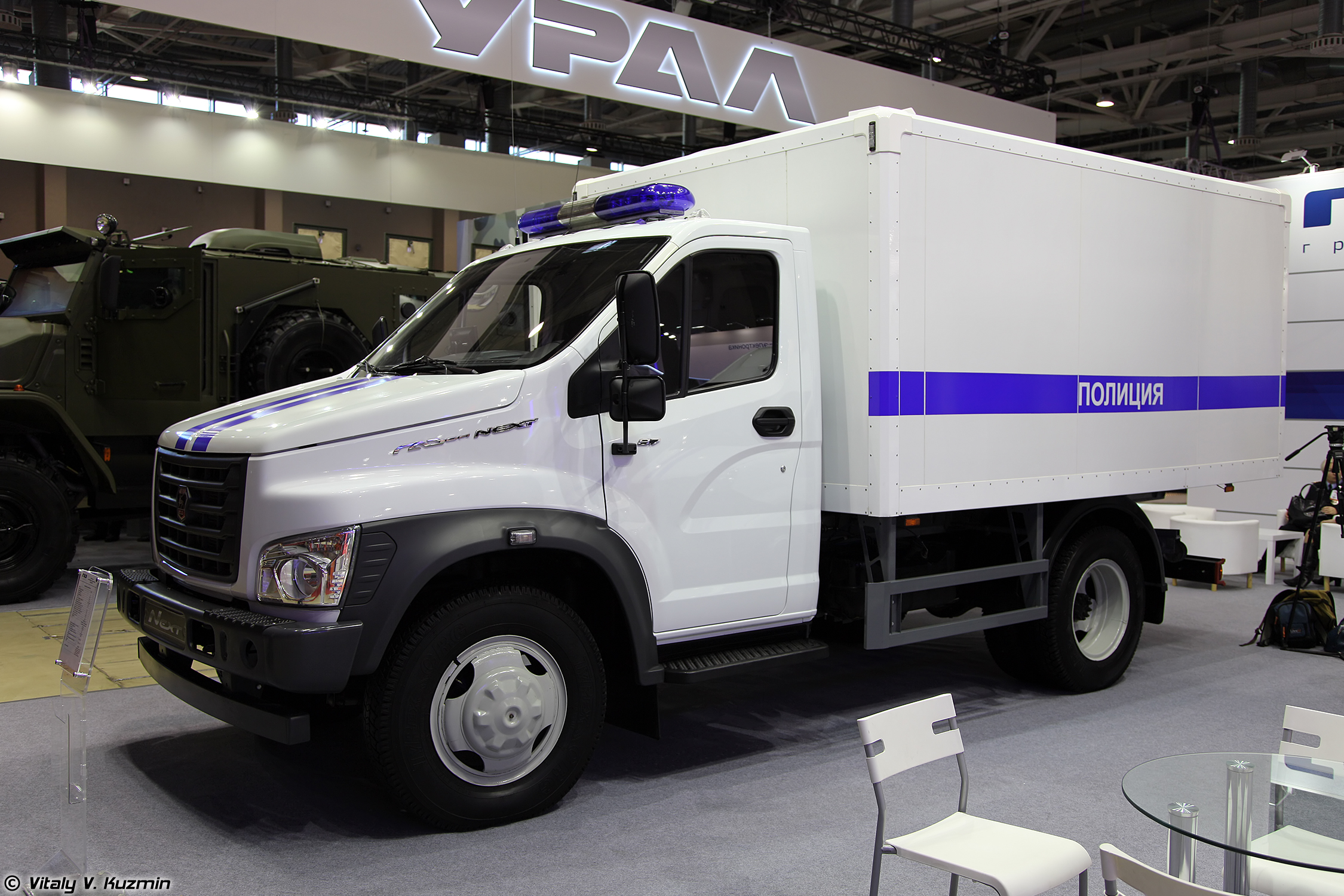
GAZon NEXT prisoner transport vehicle

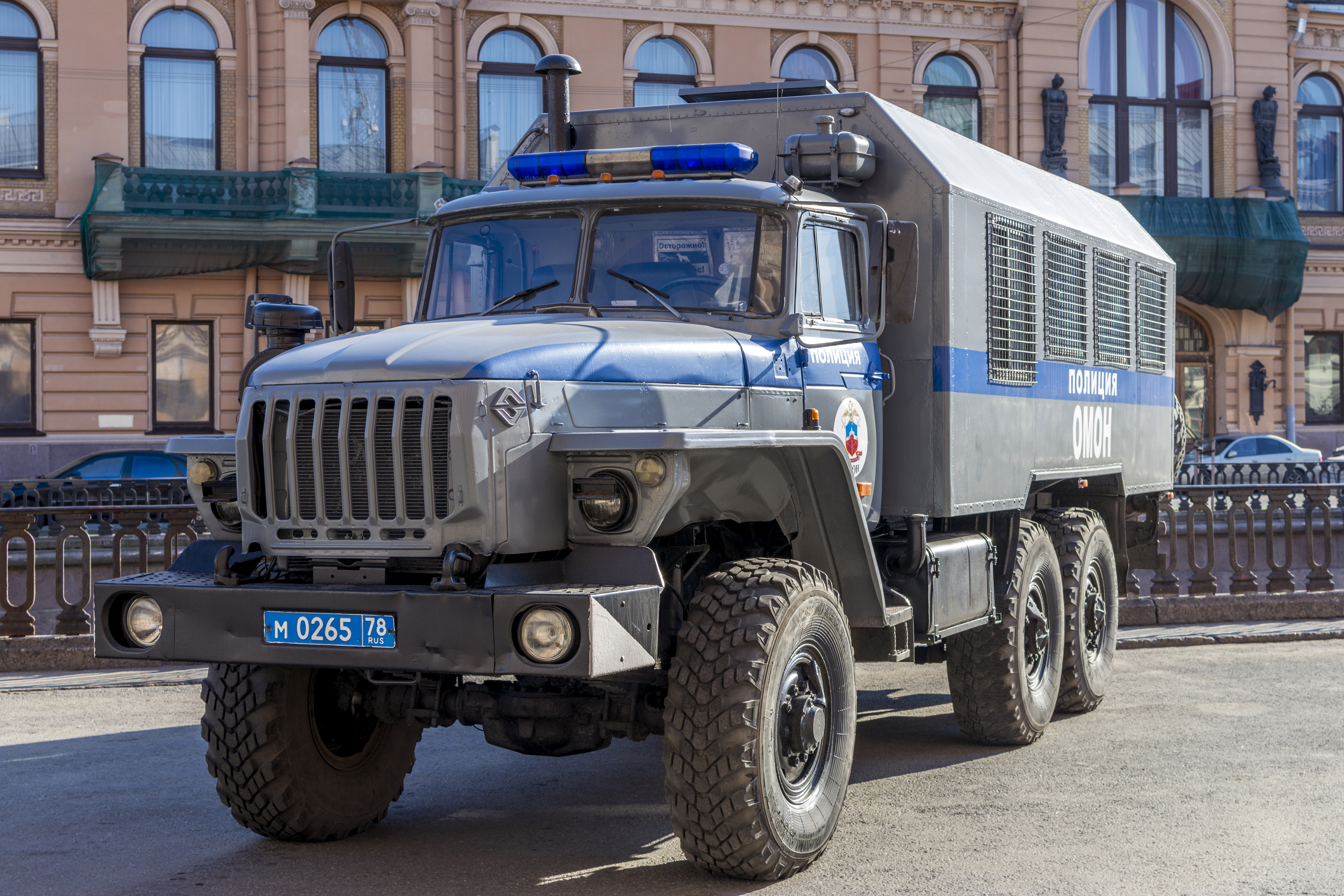
Automobile-van 572060 also known as VM-4320 on Ural-4320 chassis

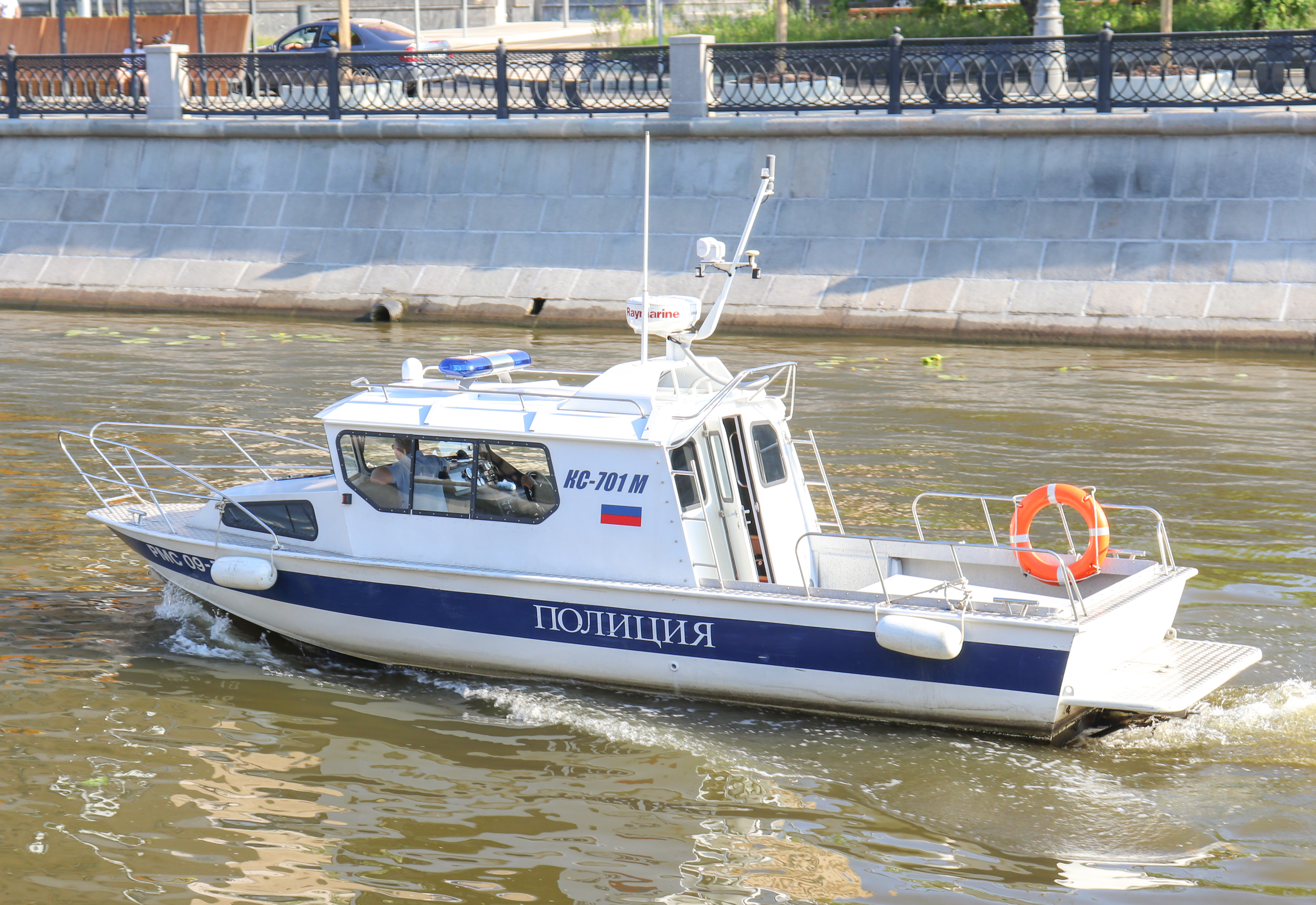
A police boat in Moscow

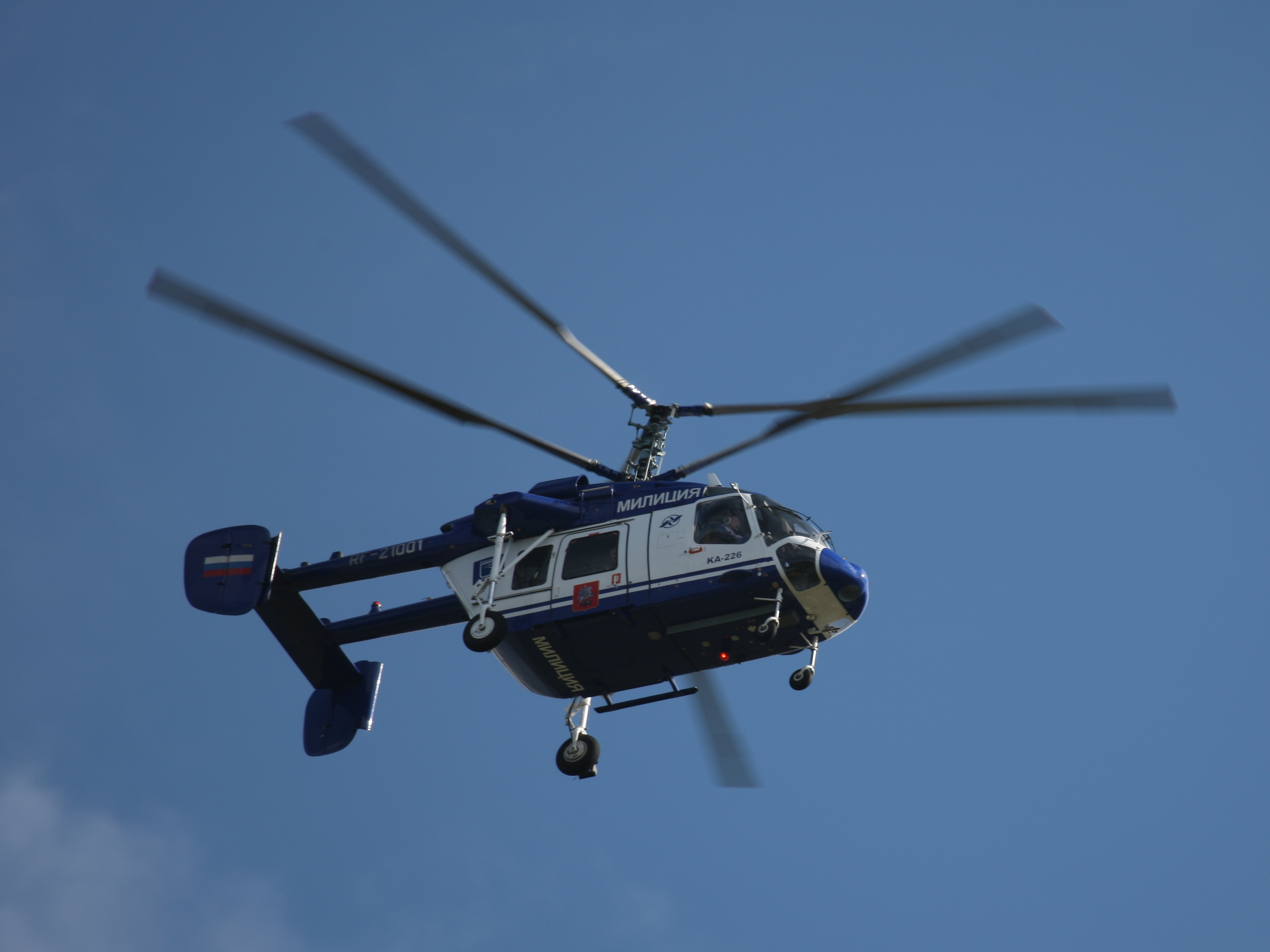
Kamov Ka-226

=== Weaponry ===
| Model | Origin | Type |
|---|---|---|
| Makarov | Soviet Union | Semi-automatic pistol |
| MP-443 Grach | Russia | Semi-automatic pistol |
| GSh-18 | Russia | Semi-automatic pistol |
| CZ-75 | Czechoslovakia | Semi-automatic pistol |
| KS-23 | Soviet Union | Shotgun |
| Saiga-12S | Russia | Shotgun |
| OTs-02 Kiparis | Soviet Union | Submachine gun |
| PP-91 KEDR | Russia | Submachine gun |
| Vityaz-SN | Russia | Submachine gun |
| PP-19 Bizon | Russia | Submachine gun |
| PP-2000 | Russia | Submachine gun |
| AKS-74U | Soviet Union | Assault rifle |
| AS Val | Soviet Union | Assault rifle |
| AEK-971 | Soviet Union | Assault rifle |
| A-91 | Soviet Union | Assault rifle |
| AK-74M | Russia | Assault rifle |
| AK-103 | Russia | Assault rifle |
| AK-104 | Russia | Assault rifle |
| 9A-91 | Russia | Assault rifle |

== See also ==
- Police Department of Russia
- Militsiya
- Ministry of Internal Affairs
- Moscow Police
- Saint Petersburg Police
- Nizhny Novgorod Oblast Police
- Crimea Police
- Sevastopol Police
- National Police of Ukraine
- Registered Cossacks of the Russian Federation
- Marengo, a color used for police uniform.

General:

- Law enforcement in Russia
- Crime in Russia
