= List of people from Tambov =

Coat of Arms of Tambov

This is a list of notable people who were born or have lived in Tambov, Tambov Oblast, Russia.

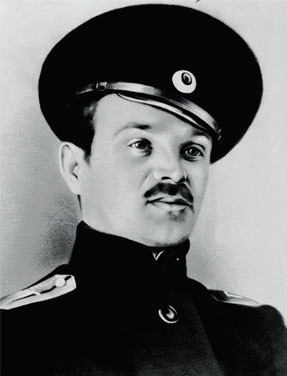
Vasily Agapkin (1884–1964)

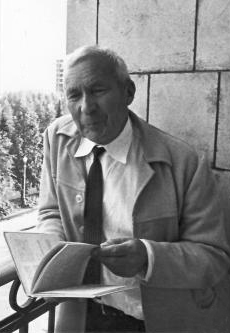
Andrey Kolmogorov (1903–1987)

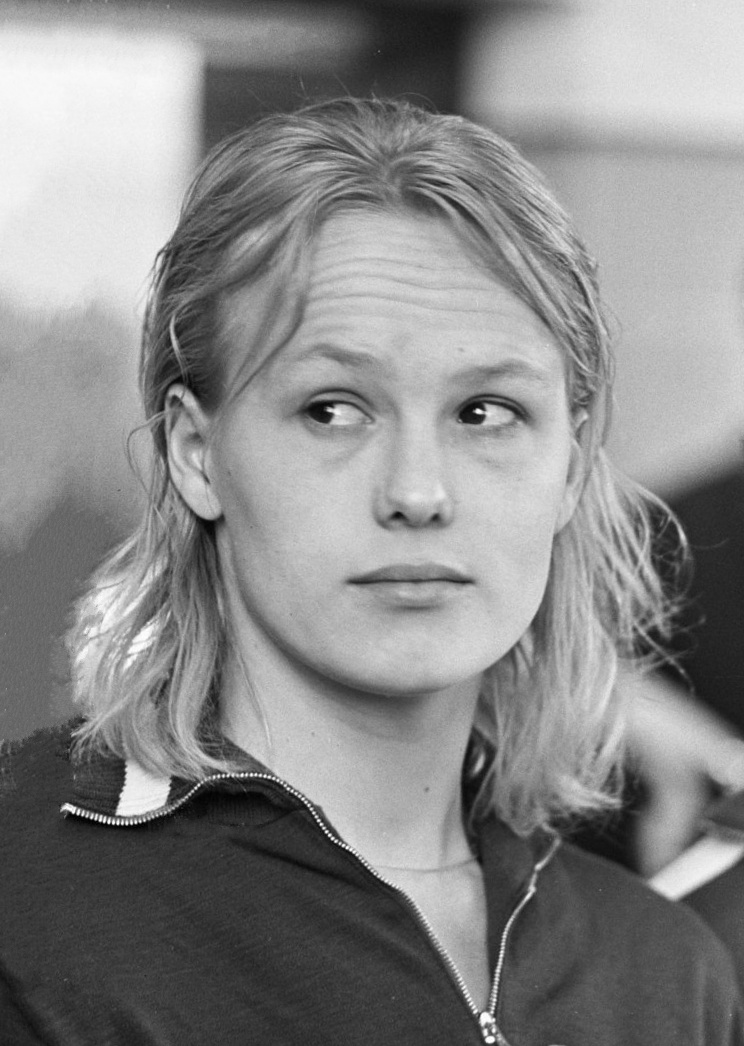
Svetlana Babanina (born 1943)

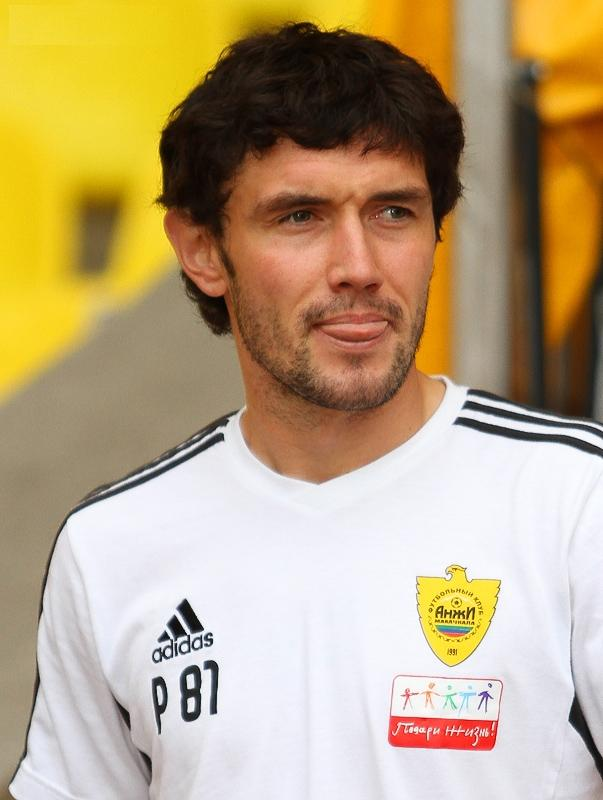
Yuri Zhirkov (born 1983)

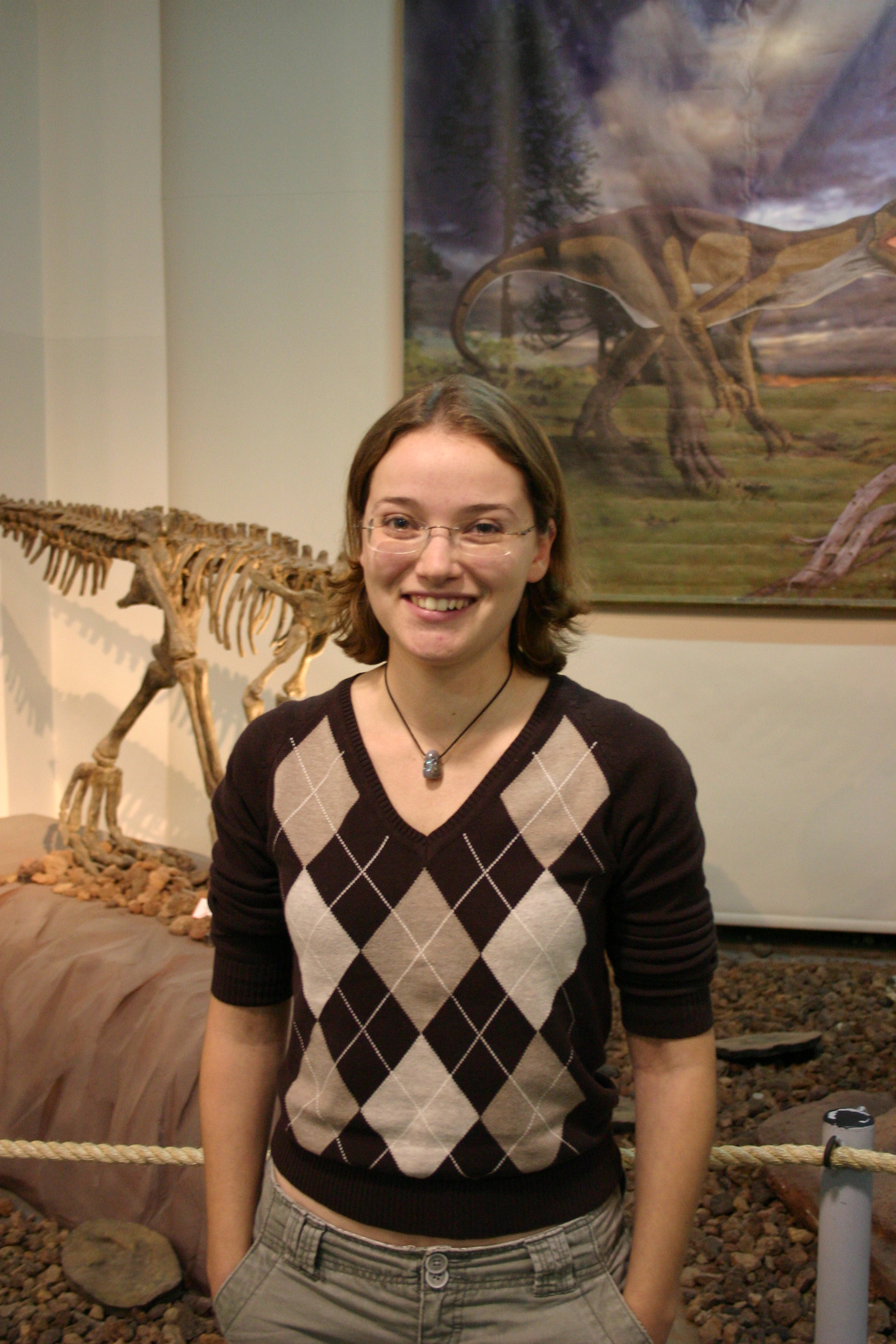
Bella Igla (born 1985)

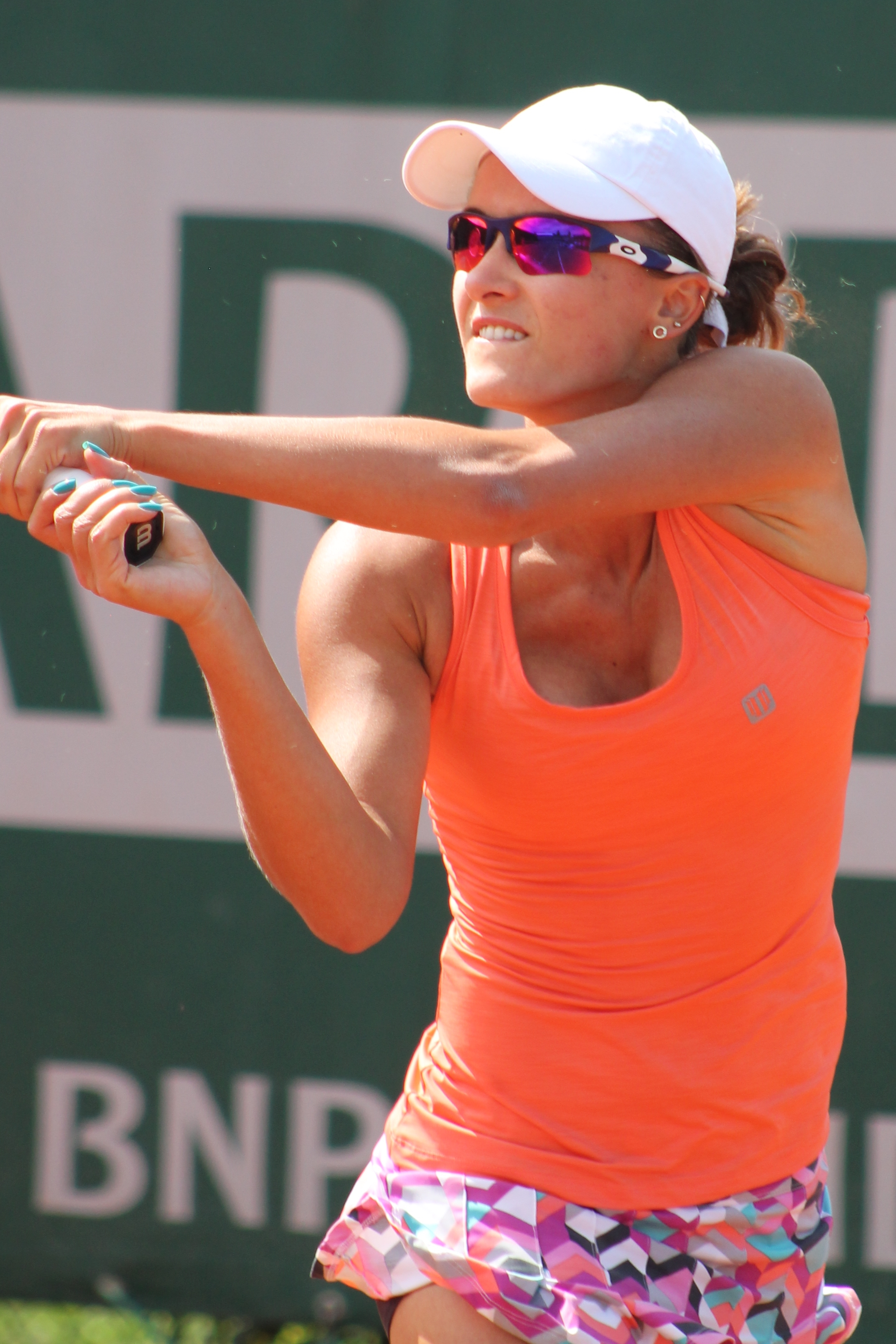
Arina Rodionova (born 1989)

== Born in Tambov ==
=== 18th century ===
==== 1701–1800 ====
- Nikolay Gamalei (1795–1859), Russian statesman, Vitebsk governor, served in the Ministry of Internal Affairs

=== 19th century ===
==== 1801–1900 ====
- Boris Chicherin (1828–1904), Russian jurist and political philosopher
- Nikolai Fyodorov (1829–1903), Russian Orthodox Christian philosopher, who was part of the Russian cosmism movement and a precursor of transhumanism
- Ivan Minayev (1840–1890), the first Russian Indologist
- Constantin Fahlberg (1850–1910), Russian chemist
- Nikita Galakhov (1864–1912), inventor of the elliptical springs for the railroad carriages
- Vladimir Shchuko (1878–1939), Russian architect
- Sophia Satina (1879-1975), Russian botanist
- Nikolai Cholodny (1882–1953), Soviet influential microbiologist
- Vasily Agapkin (1884–1964), Russian and Soviet military orchestra conductor, composer, and author of the well-known march "Farewell of Slavianka" (written 1912)
- Maria Spiridonova (1884–1941), Russian socialist revolutionary
- Alexey Selezniev (1888–1967), Russian chess master and chess composer
- Vasili Vanin (1898–1951), Russian stage and film actor of the Soviet era
- Lev Kuleshov (1899–1970), Russian and Soviet filmmaker and film theorist

=== 20th century ===
==== 1901–1920 ====
- Zoia Gaidai (1902–1965), Soviet Ukrainian opera soprano
- Andrey Kolmogorov (1903–1987), Russian mathematician
- Vera Faddeeva (1906–1983), Russian mathematician
- Valentin Avrorin (1907–1977), Member of the Academy of Sciences of the USSR
- Ida Kar (1908–1974), photographer
- Ivan Dzerzhinsky (1909–1978), Russian composer
- Olga Ivinskaya (1912–1995), Russian poet and writer
- Valery Zhelobinsky (1913–1946), Russian composer and pianist
- Vladimir Svetilko (1915–1995), Russian lightweight weightlifter
- Victor Merzhanov (1919–2012), Russian pianist
- Pavel Bliznetsov (1913–1989), Russian Eastern Catholic priest and author

==== 1921–1950 ====
- Vladimir Teplyakov (1925–2009), Russian experimental physicist
- Victoria Barbă (1926–2020), Moldovan animated film director
- Vladimir Bolotin (1926–2008), Russian Mechanical engineer
- Vitaly Galkov (1939–1998), Soviet-born Russian sprint canoer
- Aleksandr Dokhlyakov (born 1942), Soviet cyclist
- Svetlana Babanina (born 1943), Soviet swimmer
- Yury Chernavsky (1947–2025), Russian producer, composer and songwriter
- Oleg Betin (1950–2023), Russian politician; governor of Tambov Oblast

==== 1951–1980 ====
- Victor Krylov (born 1952), Russian-born British academic
- Ludmila Engquist (Narozhilenko; born 1964), Soviet/Russian/Swedish athlete; champion sprinter
- Svetlana Nageykina (born 1965), Soviet/Russian cross-country skier
- Aleksandr Khalzov (born 1965), Russian professional footballer
- Sergey Kuznetsov (born 1966), Russian professional football coach and a former player
- Alexei Kovalev (born 1973), Russian football referee
- Aleksandr Malin (born 1973), Russian professional football coach and a former player
- Ruslan Sviridov (born 1973), Russian classical pianist, pedagogue
- Aleksandr Kudryashov (born 1974), Russian professional footballer
- Igor Neuchev (born 1974), Russian professional footballer
- Kyrylo Pospyeyev (born 1975), Ukrainian former professional cyclist
- Yekaterina Nesterenko (born 1976), Russian alpine skier
- Vladislav Frolov (born 1980), Russian sprint athlete

==== 1981–2000 ====
- Sergei Lebedkov (born 1981), Russian professional football player
- Anastasia Rodionova (born 1982), Russian-born Australian professional tennis player
- Aleksey Mikhalyov (born 1983), Russian professional football player
- Yuri Zhirkov (born 1983), Russian footballer
- Pavel Kushnir (1984–2024), Russian pianist, writer, and political activist
- Bella Igla (born 1985), Israeli female chess player
- Viktor Tolstykh (born 1985), Russian professional football player
- Arina Rodionova (born 1989), Russian-born Australian professional tennis player

== Born in Tambov Governorate ==
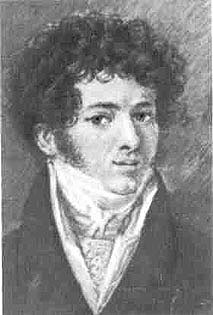
Afanasy Grigoriev (1782–1868)

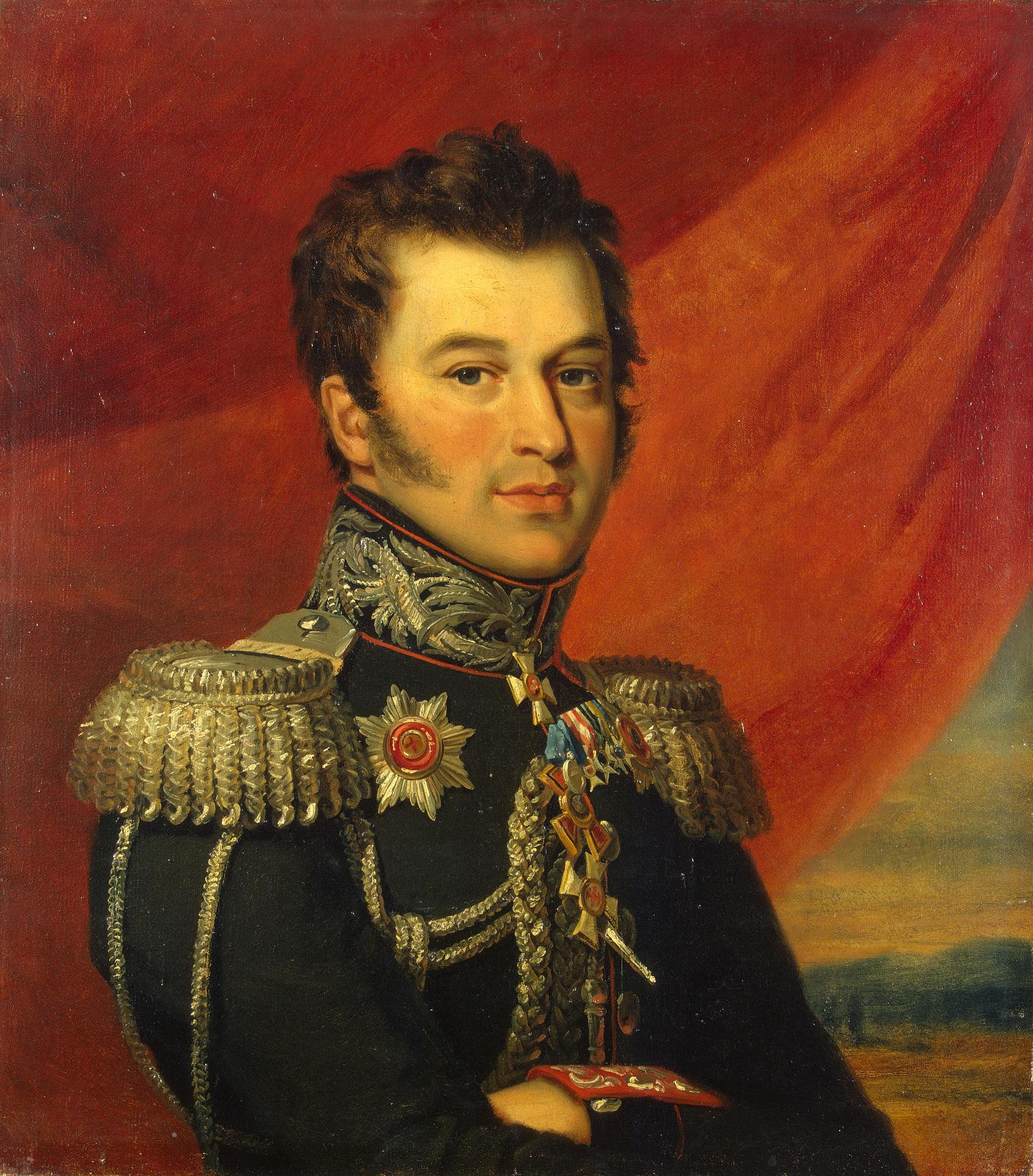
Paisi Kaysarov (1783–1844)

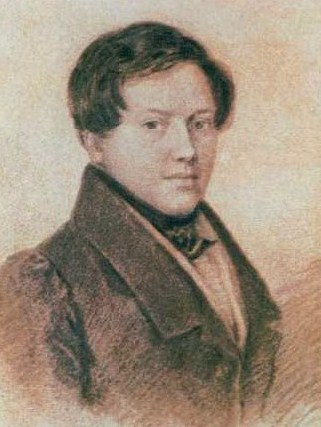
Yevgeny Baratynsky (1800–1844)

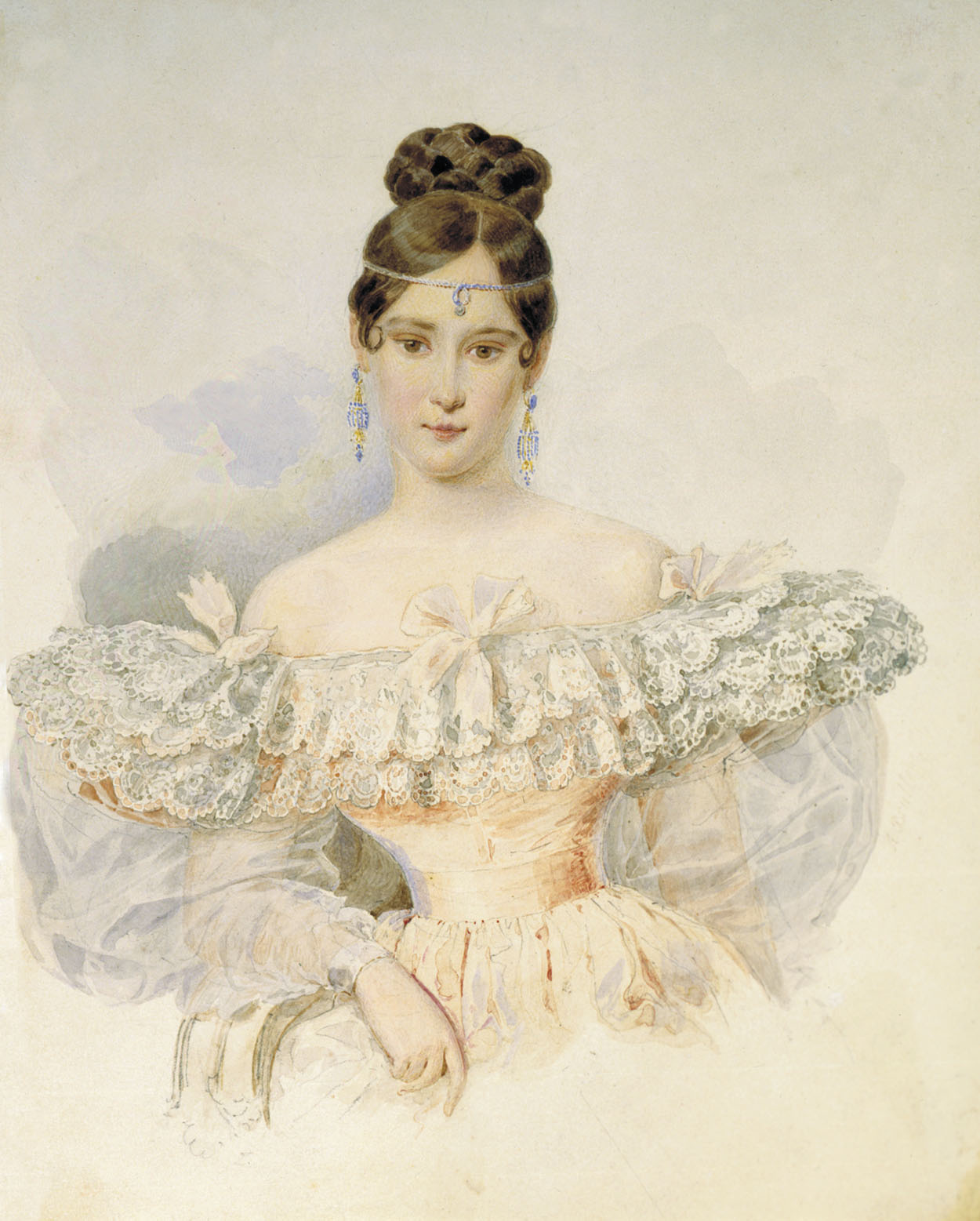
Natalia Goncharova (1812–1863)

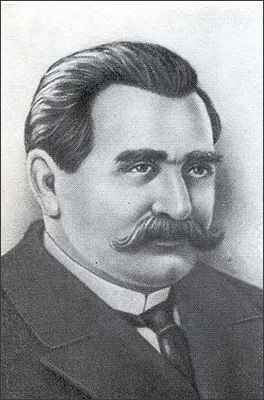
Alexander Lodygin (1847–1923)

=== 18th century ===
==== 1701–1800 ====
- Nikolai Arkharov (1742–1814), Russian statesman
- Afanasy Grigoriev (1782–1868), Russian Neoclassical architect, took part in the reconstruction of Moscow after the War 1812
- Paisi Kaysarov (1783–1844), Russian general who served during the Napoleonic Wars
- Yevgeny Baratynsky (1800–1844), Russian poet

=== 19th century ===
==== 1801–1850 ====
- Natalia Goncharova (1812–1863), A. S. Pushkin's wife. She was born in the village Karian-Zagryazhskoye of the Tambov province.
- Andrei Karelin (1837–1906), Russian artist, photographer of the Academy of Arts
- Alexander Lodygin (1847–1923), one of the founders of the electrothermy, author of almost 400 inventions including a tungsten filament lamp. He was born in the village of Stenshino of the Tambov province.

==== 1851–1900 ====
- Maksim Dmitriyev (1858–1948), Russian photographer
- Vladimir Arnoldi (1871–1924), Russian botanist
- Konstantin Igumnov (1873–1948), Russian pianist-virtuoso, professor of Moscow Conservatory
- Anastasius (Gribanovsky) (1873–1965), hierarch of the Russian Orthodox Church and the second First Hierarch of the Russian Orthodox Church Outside Russia
- Benjamin (Fedchenkov) (1880–1961), Bishop of the Russian Church, Orthodox missionary and writer
- Lev Ilyin (1880–1942), Russian architect, in 1925–1938 the main architect of Leningrad
- Aleksandr Gerasimov (1881–1963), Soviet painter
- Nikolay Annenkov (Kokin) (1899–1999), patriarch of the Moscow Maly Theatre

=== 20th century ===
==== 1901–1937 ====
- Yevgeny Krinov (1906–1984), Soviet Russian astronomer and geologist
- Alexei T. Sergeev (1919–1998), bass singer; one of the Alexandrov Ensemble soloists, People's Artist of the USSR
- Nikolay Basov (1922–2001), Soviet physicist and educator
- Vsevolod Bobrov (1922–1979), Soviet Russian athlete, who excelled in football, bandy and ice hockey
- Zoya Kosmodemyanskaya (1923–1941), Soviet partisan and Hero of the Soviet Union
- Sergei Filatov (1926–1997), Olympic equestrian champion
- Ivan Kalita (1927–1996), Soviet equestrian and Olympic champion

== Born in Tambov Oblast ==
=== 1938–2000 ===
- Igor Uporov (born 1965), Russian advocate

== Lived in Tambov ==
- Matvei Bashkin (16th century), Russian boyar's son, the first martyr of the Russian Molokan faith
- Feofil (Rayev) (1738–1811), Bishop of Tambov
- Gavrila Derzhavin (1743–1816), Russian poet
- Michael Lunin (1787–1845), Russian political philosopher, revolutionary, Mason, Decembrist
- Mikhail Lermontov (1814–1841), well-known Russian poet
- Theophan the Recluse (Georgy Govorov; 1815–1894), Bishop of Tambov; saint in the Russian Orthodox Church
- Aleksey Zhemchuzhnikov (1821–1908), Russian poet, dramatist, essayist and literary critic
- Ivan Vladimirovich Michurin (1855–1935), plant breeder
- Maxim Gorky (Alexei Peshkov) (1868–1936), Russian and Soviet writer and public figure, a founder of socialist realism literature
- Luka (Voyno-Yasenetsky) (1877–1961), Doctor of Medicine and surgeon
- David Burliuk (1882–1967), Russian poet and painter
- Alexander Antonov (1888–1922), leader of the Tambov peasant revolt (1920–1921)
- Konstantin Fedin (1892–1977), Russian writer
- Lev Dyomin (1926–1998), Russian cosmonaut
- Yury Artyukhin (1930–1998), Soviet Russian cosmonaut and engineer

== See also ==
- List of Russian people
- List of Russian-language poets
