= Zholobov (surname) =

Zholobov (Russian: Жолобов; Ukrainian: Жолобов) is a Russian masculine surname; its feminine equivalent is Zholobova. Notable people with this surname include:

- Vitaly Zholobov (born 1937), Soviet retired cosmonaut
- Maria Zholobova (born 1989), Russian investigative journalist
- Valeria Koblova (née Zholobova; born 1992), Russian wrestler

== See also ==
- Zholobov, a rural locality in Volgograd Oblast, Russia
