= Kudryashov =

Kudryashov (Russian: Кудряшо́в) and Kudryashova (Russian: Кудряшо́ва; feminine) is a common Russian surname. Notable people with the surname include:

- Aleksandr Kudryashov (born 1974), Russian football player
- Andrey Kudryashov (born 1991), Russian speedway rider
- Dmitri Kudryashov (born 1983), Russian football player
- Dmitry Kudryashov (boxer) (born 1985), Russian boxer
- Fyodor Kudryashov (born 1987), Russian football player
- German Kudryashov (born 1964), Russian football player
- Oleg Kudryashov (1932 - 2002), Russian painter
- Olga Kudryashova (born 1978), Belarusian biathlete
- Pavel Kudryashov (born 1996), Russian football player
- Valeriy Kudriashov (born 1984), Ukrainian sailor
