= Proekt =

Russian independent media outlet

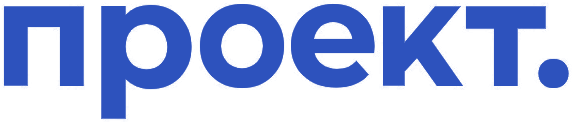
- Website type: Investigative journalism
- Available in: Russian; English
- Country of origin: Russia
- Owner: Roman Badanin
- Founders: Roman Badanin; Maria Zholobova; Mikhail Rubin
- Editor: Roman Badanin
- Employees: 17 (March 2021)
- Website: proekt.media (Russian) proekt.media/en (English) agents.media (Russian)
- Registration: None
- Launched: 2018
- Current status: Active

Proekt (Russian: Проект, romanized: Proyekt, lit. 'Project') is an independent Russian media outlet specialising in investigative journalism. In 2021, Proekt was relaunched as Agentstvo (Агентство, 'Agency'), but restored its original name in 2022, while Agentstvo became a news website.

== History and activities ==
Since 2001, Roman Badanin has worked for Gazeta.Ru, Forbes, Interfax, RBK and TV Rain as editor-in-chief. In 2017, he left the country to study journalism at Stanford University in California. In 2018, after graduating from his studies and returning to Russia, he decided to engage in investigative journalism in the format of an online media, which he had previously done. As of July 2018, Proekt had 10 employees and its initial budget was 500,000 dollars.

Proekt specialises in investigative journalism. The website of the media publishes text versions of the investigations, on the YouTube channel the media uploads short documentaries and podcasts. Proekt also posts materials on Telegram, VKontakte, Instagram, Yandex.Zen, Twitter and Facebook. Proekt exists at the expense of donations from its readers and sponsors.

Since 2019, after publications about the Russian paramilitary organisation Wagner, the journalists of the Project have been under surveillance by the Russian authorities.

In 2020, after The New York Times newspaper won International Reporting Prize, Proekt said that at least two articles in the winning entry repeated findings of Proekt's articles published a few months before without citing the source.

On June 28, 2021, Proekt announced that they would publish an investigation into the property of the relatives of Russia's Interior Minister Vladimir Kolokoltsev. The next day, Moscow police raided apartments of Roman Badanin, deputy editor in chief Mikhail Rubin and co-founder of Proekt Maria Zholobova; the police also seized journalistic equipment. Officially, the searches were connected with a 2017 journalistic investigation about Putin's friend, businessman and crime boss Ilya Traber. Natalia Zviagina, director of the Russian office of Amnesty International, said the raid is a "part of a systematic cleansing of any critical voices exposing the malpractices of those in power in the country".

On July 15, 2021, Russian authorities banned Proekt and labelled five of its journalists as so-called "foreign agents". Proekt became the first news outlet that has been designated as a so-called "undesirable organisation" in Russia. This designation prohibits the activities of the organisation on the territory of Russia and prescribes sanctions for anyone who supports the organisation. Badanin called the authorities' decision the best recognition. The head of Meduza's investigation department, Alexey Kovalev, said that the reason for the ban was Proekt's investigations into the top officials of the Kremlin. Russian journalist Andrey Kolesnikov said that the persecution of Proekt is a signal to the rest of the media: "See what we can and behave yourself."

On 2 June 2023, the Ministry of Justice of Russia added Proekt and its journalists Roman Badanin, Mikhail Rubin, Ekaterina Arenina, Vitalii Soldatskikh, Mikhail Maglov, Polina Machold, Boris Dubakh, Sofia Manevich to the so-called list of "foreign agents". It was the first an entity was added to the so-called "list" after it had already been banned under so-called "undesirable organisation" statute.

== Notable investigations ==
The first investigations were devoted to different topics. Later, the publication began to post materials about secret connections and business activities of Russian officials and parties, corruption schemes of the highest echelons of the Russian government and big business, and the pressure and influence of the Russian government on the media and social networks. Investigations were released about people living in the Rublyovka prestigious residential area, the ties between Russian energy company Rosneft and Amaffi, the income of the head of Chechnya Ramzan Kadyrov and member of the State Duma for Chechnya Adam Delimkhanov, as well as a special project "Iron Masks" (Russian: Железные маски, romanized: Zheleznye Maski) dedicated to Russian president Vladimir Putin and his friends.

On 1 April 2022, Proekt published an investigation in which it found that Putin is often accompanied by a doctor specialising in thyroid cancer. The Kremlin's spokesman, Dmitry Peskov, denied that Putin had undergone surgery for thyroid cancer.

In 2023, Proekt released the film "His War" about how Vladimir Putin started the war against Ukraine; The large-scale investigation "Lapdogs of war", containing a list of Russian oligarchs involved in the supply of products to the Russian defense industry; An investigation into the Minister of Emergency Situations Aleksandr Kurenkov, in which it found the minister's wife and assets linked to her; The investigation "Iron Masks. Final Season", dedicated to Vladimir Putin and Alina Kabaeva; "Everyday Life and Morals of the P. Era", dedicated to the land holdings built around the presidential residence and Vladimir Putin's relatives; "The portrait of Herman Gref, Russia’s most liberal kleptocrat", dedicated to the offshore activities of the CEO of Sberbank, and other significant investigations.

== Awards ==
In April 2019, Proekt's article Шеф и повар. Часть третья., 'Master and Chef. How Russia interfered in elections in twenty countries' received the Redkollegia award.

In November 2019, journalists of Proekt received "Journalism as a Profession" award in the category "Interview with Pictures" for an article "The Man Behind the Kremlin’s Control of the Russian Media".

In February 2020, Proekt's article "Highway to nowhere." (Russian: Шоссе в никуда., romanized: Shosse v nikuda.) received Redkollegia award.

In July 2020, Proekt's article "Brothers Ltd. How a Representative of a Top Chechen Leader ‘Solved’ Russian Business Disputes — And Walked Away With Millions" received Redkollegia award.

In August 2020, Proekt received the Free Media Awards for "its investigative research on corruption and abuse of power" from the German ZEIT-Stiftung and the Norwegian Fritt Ord.
