= Yury Zhelyabovskiy =

Russian businessman (born 1976)

- Born: 23 October 1976 (40 years old); Barnaul, Altai Region, USSR
- Education: Moscow State Institute of International Relations, MBA, PhD in economics
- Occupations: Beneficial owner of novosibirskenergosbyt, chitanergosbyt, byryatenergosbyt, novgorodoblenergo, brianskoblelectro.

Yury Zhelyabovskiy (born in Barnaul, Russia, in 1976) is a London-based Russian businessman, an owner of Russian electric power distribution companies, and the former CEO of Energostream, the biggest private Russian electric-power-distribution holding company.

== Education ==
In 1998, Zhelyabovskiy graduated with honors from the Moscow State Institute of International Relations, which is administered by the Ministry of Foreign Affairs. In 2000, he received a master's degree and, in 2008, a PhD in economics on business planning in industrial corporations.

== Career ==
From 2000 to 2008, Zhelyabovskiy worked, at various positions, for the state-owned energy holding company OAO RAO UES (Unified Energy System of Russia). In 2004–2008, he was the head of the Economic Analysis and Financial Control Department in Business-Unit N2, which accounted for 40% of energy output in the Russian Federation. He also served on boards of directors of various energy companies.

In 2008, OAO RAO UES was reorganized, and the majority of its assets were sold at auction to private investors.

In 2008, Zhelyabovskiy, along with his partners Andrey Shandalov and Valeriy Eliseev, founded the energy holding company Energostream, and became its CEO.

From March 2010 to June 2012, he was chairman of a non-commercial partnership board that included more than 100 guaranteed energy distributors covering 70% of the Russian energy distribution market.

Zhelyabovskiy was also a member of the Energy Market Council Supervisory Board and the Public Council of Russian Federal Energy Tariffs Committee, which are working groups established by the Russian Government to develop energy markets operating models.

In 2010, Zhelyabovskiy and Shandalov bought out Eliseev's share in Energostream.

In 2011, Energostream declared total revenues of 240 billion roubles ($8.5 billion) and EBITDA of 14.5 billion roubles ($500 million). Energostream comprised 23 energy distribution companies, 3 energy transportation companies, one TV channel, the football club DINAMO-Bryansk, communal companies, and other assets. In addition to energy, Energostream supplied gas to its customers.

In autumn 2011, Deutsche Bank valued Energostream at $1.5 billion, which made it was the largest private company in the Russian energy sector.

In 2012–2013, Energostream was partially nationalized by the Russian Government.

In 2013, Zhelyabovskiy moved to London with his family and focused on strategy planning of his assets and charity.

== Corporate Conflict ==
As a co-owner of Energostream, Shandalov granted loans to the affiliated Optima group of companies. In 2010–2011, total funds transferred to Energostream subsidiaries amounted to 20 billion roubles ($600 million).

After the police started criminal proceedings against Energostream management and Zhelyabovskiy personally, Shandalov initiated bankruptcy procedure in the company's subsidiaries to prevent loan repayment.

Failure to repay the loans caused conflict between the respective owners, followed by numerous court proceedings, extensive press coverage, and criminal cases against the borrowers controlled by Shandalov.

== Criminal Case ==
In December 2011, the Duma's Energy Committee met to consider the conflict of interests of government officials granting special preferences to affiliated companies. Zhelyabovskiy was among the employees criticized by Russian Prime-Minister Vladimir Putin for Energostream's involvement in buying shares in foreign companies.

Zhelyabovskiy was the only purely private business representative who didn't hold government office and didn't meet the Energy Committee's criteria of handling affiliated business transactions. Nevertheless, the accusations against Energostream management and Zhelyabovskiy were broadcast by state TV channels for several weeks.

The popular business newspaper Vedomosti and other news media came to the conclusion that this prominence was connected to the government's intent to control assets of the largest private energy holding in Russia.

In 2013, following Vladimir Putin's instructions given to Vladimir Kolokoltsev, the head of the police, widely broadcast on state TV, the police initiated several criminal cases against Energostream management and Zhelyabovskiy personally.

In 2013, in accordance with a special government resolution, most of the licenses for energy distribution were transferred from holding companies to the state owned transportation company MRSK Holding.

In 2013 and 2016, Russian authorities submitted requests for Zhelyabovskiy's extradition from Great Britain. Both times these requests were rejected by the British government on the grounds of politically related prosecution.

== Business ==
Zhelyabovskiy is an owner of the following companies:

- Novosibirskenergosbyt – third largest region in Russia with 40 billion roubles revenue;
- Chitaenergosbyt – 12 billion roubles revenue;
- Buriatenergosbyt – 8 billion roubles revenue;
- Novgorodoblenergo – transportation company in Novgorod region;
- Bryanskoblenergo – transportation company in Bryansk region, the largest private transportation company in Russia.

== Charity ==
In 2010, Zhelyabovskiy established the charity foundation "Protect the Child". It was aimed at improving children's quality of life, to promote child care and child protection legislation. The foundation was suspended in 2012.
