= Bliznetsov =

Bliznetsov (masculine, Russian: Близнецов) or Bliznetsova (feminine, Russian: Близнецова) is a Russian surname. Notable people with the surname include:

- Hennadiy Bleznitsov (born 1941), Ukrainian pole vaulter
- Pavel Bliznetsov (1913–1989), Russian priest
