= Vladimir Kolokoltsev =

Russian politician and police officer (born 1961)

General of the Police Vladimir Kolokoltsev
- Владимир Колокольцев
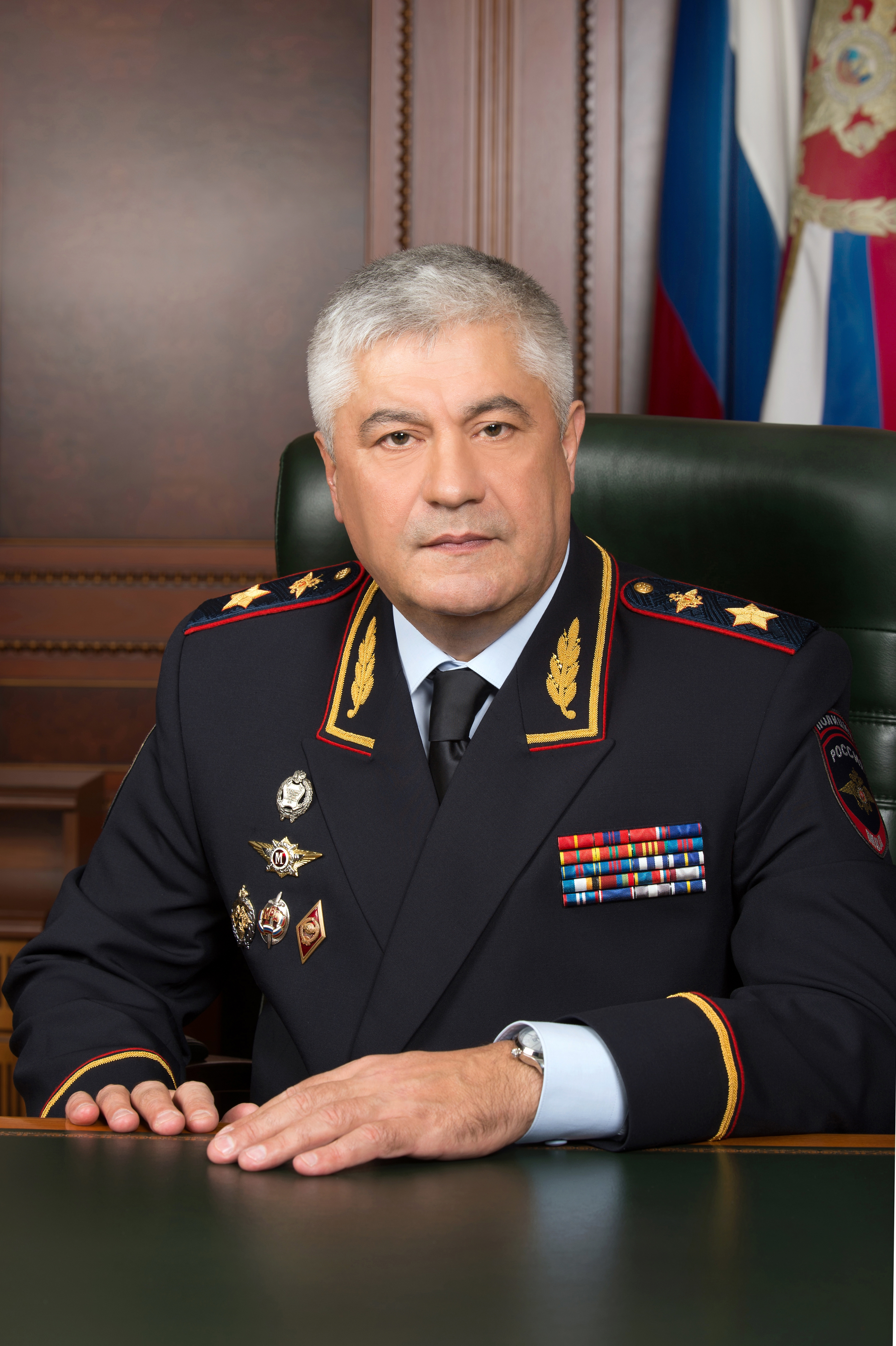
- Official portrait

Minister of Internal Affairs
- Incumbent
- Assumed office 21 May 2012
- President: Vladimir Putin
- Prime Minister: Dmitry Medvedev; Mikhail Mishustin
- Preceded by: Rashid Nurgaliyev

Commissioner of Moscow City Police
- In office 7 September 2009 – 21 May 2012
- Preceded by: Alexander Ivanov
- Succeeded by: Viktor Golovanov (Acting)

Personal details
- Born: 11 May 1961 (age 65) Nizhny Lomov, Russian SFSR, Soviet Union (now Russia)
- Party: Independent

Military service
- Allegiance: Soviet Union; Russia
- Branch/service: Ministry of Internal Affairs (Soviet Union); Ministry of Internal Affairs (Russia)
- Years of service: 1982—
- Rank: General of the Police

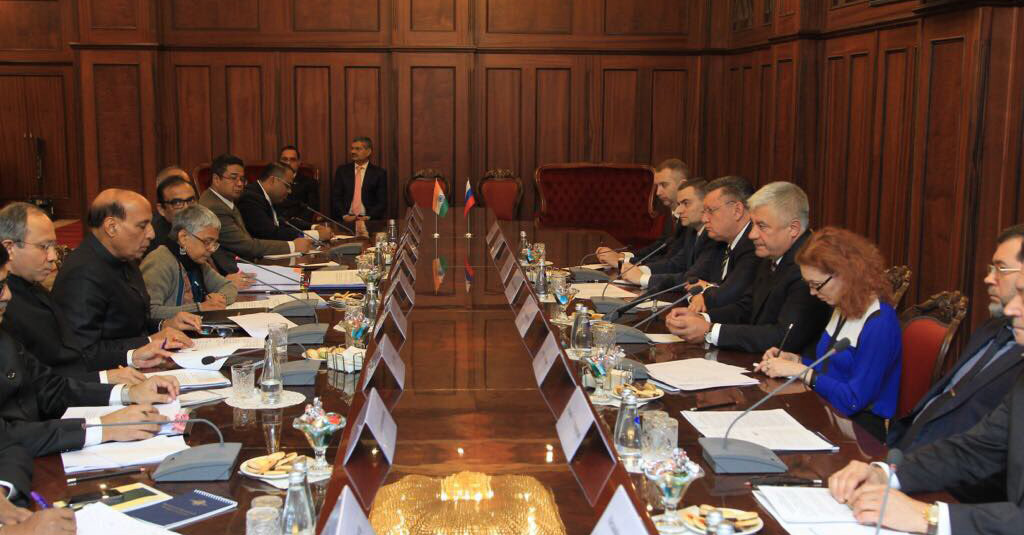
Kolokoltsev holding a bilateral meeting with Indian delegation led by Rajnath Singh, Moscow, 27 November 2017

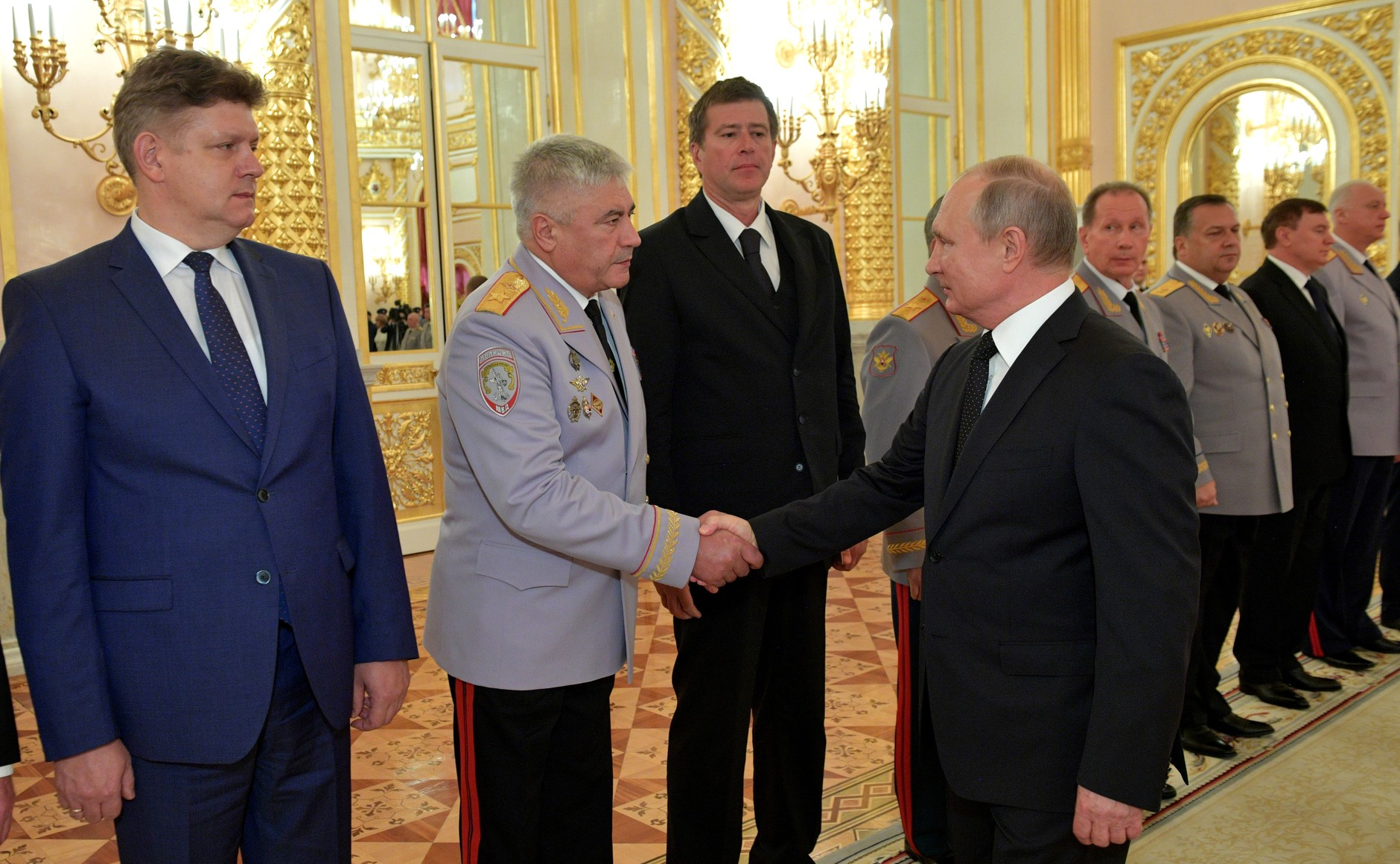
Kolokoltsev at a meeting of Vladimir Putin with senior officers on 25 October 2018

Vladimir Alexandrovich Kolokoltsev (Russian: Владимир Александрович Колокольцев; born 11 May 1961) is a Russian politician and police officer who was the Moscow Police Commissioner from 2009 to 2012. He has been Russian Minister of Internal Affairs since 21 May 2012.

== Biography ==
=== Moscow police officer (1982-1997) ===
Kolokoltsev entered police service in 1982. He started his career in a special unit guarding foreign diplomatic missions in Moscow.

In 1984, he was appointed platoon commander of the separate patrol battalion of the Gagarinskiy district executive committee in Moscow.

He entered the Higher Political College of the Ministry of the Interior of the USSR studying jurisprudence and graduated in 1989.

Then he served as a detective of Criminal Investigation Unit of Kuntsevo district executive committee in Moscow. He advanced to the position of the deputy chief of police station No. 20 in Moscow, and later the chief of police station No. 8 in Moscow.

In 1992, he was assigned to Criminal Investigation Department of Moscow Police Department HQ on the position of senior detective of the second unit.

At the beginning of 1993, he was appointed to the position of the chief of police station No. 108 in Moscow. Two years later he was appointed to the position of the chief of criminal investigation division in Central District Police Department of Moscow.

=== Ministry of Internal Affairs (1997-2012) ===
In 1997, he started to work in the Ministry of Interior of the Russian Federation and on the position of the chief of regional unit no. 4 of Department on Organized Crime Prevention of the Ministry of Interior of Russia in Moscow. Within two years he was appointed to the position of the chief of Regional Operational Search Bureau of Department on Organized Crime Prevention of the Ministry of Interior of Russia for southeastern administrative region of Moscow.

In 2001, he became the chief of unit No. 3 of Operational Search Bureau of the Ministry of Interior of the Russian Federation for Central Federal Region of Russia. Afterwards he was appointed to the position of the deputy chief of this Operational Search Bureau. In 2007, he was appointed to the position of the chief of Police Department in Orlov region. In April 2009, he became the first deputy chief of Criminal Investigation Department of the Ministry of Interior of the Russian Federation. On 7 September 2009, he was appointed by the decree of the President of the Russian Federation to the position of the Moscow Police Commissioner. In 2010, he was given a special rank of "Militsiya lieutenant-general» by the Presidential decree. After re-attestation in 2011, he was re-appointed by the Presidential decree to the position of the Chief of Moscow Police and was given the rank of police lieutenant-general.

=== Minister of Interior (2012-present) ===
On 21 May 2012, he was appointed minister of interior in Dmitry Medvedev's Cabinet. He replaced Rashid Nurgaliyev in the post.

On Monday 6 August 2012, Kolokoltsev's twitter account allegedly quoted Sergei Kirpichenko, who was Russia's ambassador to Syria and located in Damascas, as saying Syrian President Bashar al-Assad "has been killed or injured" which caused a movement in the price of oil. However, Artyom Savelyev (Russian: Артём Савельев), who was the Russian embassy's press attaché in Damascus, denied the validity of the post and stated, "Our ambassador said nothing of the sort."

On 5 April 2016, Kolokoltsev was present in a meeting when Putin announced the creation of the Viktor Zolotov commanded Russian Federal National Guard (Rosguard) (Russian: Росгвардия), which was formed using troops from the Russian Interior Ministry, for "Maintaining public order, the fight against terrorism and protection of important state facilities are the functions that have always been performed by the Interior Troops. They will continue to perform them, but within the new Service," according to Zolotov. (Note: In early 2017 in support of the efforts of Vyacheslav Volodin, the Russian National Guard formed a new cyber-intelligence division under the command of Larisa Goryachko (Russian: Лариса Горячко), who formerly was employed with the operational-search bureau of the Main Directorate of the Ministry of Internal Affairs of Russia for the Ural Federal District as well as the central office of the Ministry of Internal Affairs (Russian: МВД), to "monitor the activity of citizens in social networks, revealing cases of extremism there" (Russian: отслеживать активность граждан в соцсетях, выявляя там случаи экстремизма) over the entire internet according to Rosbalt news agency (Russian: «Информационное агентство «Росбалт»).)

On 15 January 2020, he resigned as part of the cabinet, after President Vladimir Putin delivered the Presidential Address to the Federal Assembly, in which he proposed several amendments to the constitution. He was reinstated on 21 January 2020.

On 28 June 2021, the independent Russian media outlet Proekt announced that it would publish an investigation into the property of the relatives of Vladimir Kolokoltsev. The next day, Moscow police raided apartments of owner Roman Badanin, deputy editor in chief Mikhail Rubin and co-founder of Proekt Maria Zholobova; the police also seized journalistic equipment. On 15 July 2021, Russian authorities banned Proekt and labeled five of its journalists as "foreign agents". Proekt became the first news outlet that has been labeled as "undesirable organisation" in Russia.

In May 2023, he visited Saudi Arabia and met with Saudi Interior Minister Prince Abdulaziz bin Saud Al Saud.

== Sanctions ==
In April 2018, the United States imposed sanctions on Kolokoltsev and 23 other Russian nationals.

In response to the 2022 Russian invasion of Ukraine, on 6 April 2022 the Office of Foreign Assets Control of the United States Department of the Treasury added him to its list of persons sanctioned pursuant to Executive Order 14024.

== Personal life ==
Kolokoltsev is married and has a son and a daughter.

He has a Doktor Nauk (Doctor of Sciences) of Law, and has the rank of "Honoured Officer of Internal Affairs Authorities". He has been decorated with a number of state and departmental awards.

== Notes ==
Civic offices
Preceded by Alexander Ivanov	Police Commissioner of Moscow; 2009–2012	Succeeded by Viktor Golovanov; Acting
Political offices
Preceded by Rashid Nurgaliyev	Minister of Internal Affairs; 2012–present	Incumbent
