= Roman Badanin =

Russian journalist and researcher (born 1976)

- Роман Баданин
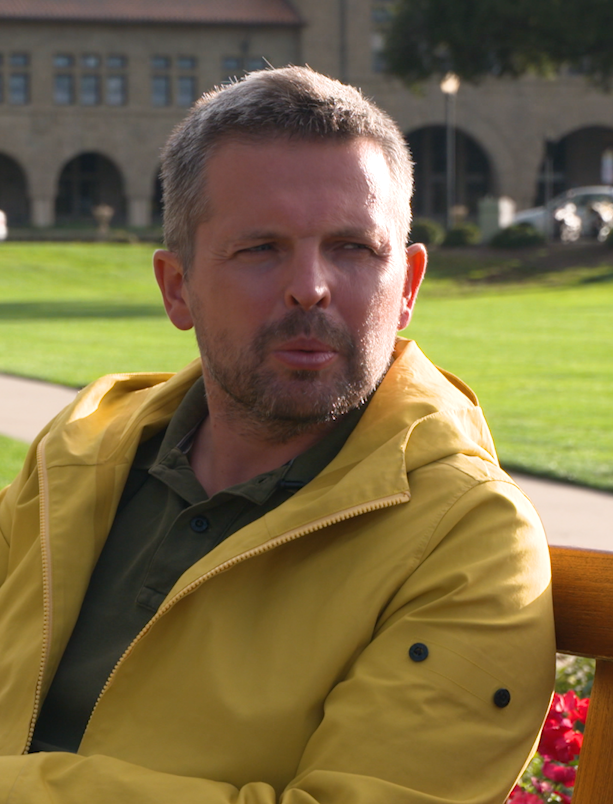
- Born: 6 November 1976 (age 49); Kurgan, Russian SFSR, Soviet Union
- Citizenship: Russia
- Education: Moscow State University; Stanford University
- Occupations: Journalist; researcher; contributing editor
- Years active: 1996–present
- Employer: Proekt
- Awards: Awards

Roman Sergeyevich Badanin (Russian: Роман Сергеевич Баданин, IPA: [bɐˈdanɪn]; born 6 November 1976) is a Russian journalist and researcher. He is the founder and editor in chief of the Proekt media outlet, former digital platform editor in chief of Forbes Russia, former editor in chief of the TV Rain and the RBK news agency. He is a CDDRL-JSK Visiting Fellow.

== Early life ==
Badanin was born on 6 November 1976. He graduated from the Faculty of History, Moscow State University.

== Career ==
Badanin was engaged in research activities at the Russian Academy of Sciences and the Gorbachev Foundation, a Russian think tank.

In 1996, Badanin began to work at the Izvestia newspaper.

In 2001, he started working for the Gazeta.Ru newspaper as a news editor. In 2011, while being the head of the policy department and deputy editor in chief, resigned due to disagreements between him and the editor-in-chief of the newspaper. Two weeks before the 2011 Russian legislative election, the newspaper received an order to place an advertisement for the ruling political party United Russia, and Badanin was against it, because the advertisement required the newspaper to remove existing banners of the Movement for Defence of Voters' Rights "Golos" and the "Violations map" project, which tracked violations in the elections and in the voting results.

From December 2011 to 26 August 2013, he was the editor in chief of the Forbes.ru website. In this position, he was responsible for the integration of the magazine and the digital platform. According to the Kommersant newspaper, Badanin left because of disagreements with the then general director of the publishing house Axel Springer Russia.

On 14 October 2013, it became known that Badanin was appointed executive director of the Internet Projects Service of the Interfax news agency.

On 15 January 2014, he began working as editor in chief of the RBK news agency. Badanin was one of the authors of the RBK's investigation about one of the daughters of Russian president Vladimir Putin, Katerina Tikhonova, and her then husband Kirill Shamalov. On 13 May 2016, Badanin quit due to pressure from Russian officials. After his resignation, more than twenty key journalists also left the agency.

On 25 July 2016, Badanin was appointed editor in chief of the TV Rain. He was one of the authors of TV Rain's reportage about the Russian businessman and criminal Ilya Traber, after which a criminal libel case was initiated.

In 2017, Badanin moved to the United States to study at Stanford University under the programme John S. Knight Journalism Fellowships at Stanford.

In 2018, he founded the Proekt media outlet, which specializes in investigative journalism. Proekt was closed in 2021 after being listed as an undesirable organization, and Badanin left Russia for his safety.

On 6 September 2021, he founded the investigative online media outlet Agentstvo ("Agency").

He is a 2022 JSK Senior International Fellow at Stanford University.

In 2025, his book about Putin, co-authored with Mikhail Rubin, "The Tsar. in Propria Persona," was published.

== Awards and honours ==
- Eight-time winner of Redkollegia journalism award.
- 2019 "Journalism as a Profession" award in the Interview with Pictures category.
- 2022 Prize for the Freedom and Future of the Media by Media Foundation of Sparkasse Leipzig (German: Preis für die Freiheit und Zukunft der Medien).
