= Anatoly Yakunin =

Russian police officer

Anatoly Yakunin Якунин, Анатолий Иванович

Police Commissioner of Moscow
- In office 2 June 2012 – 23 September 2016
- Preceded by: Viktor Golovanov
- Succeeded by: Oleg Baranov

Chief of Novgorod Oblast Police
- In office April 2011 – May 2012
- Preceded by: -
- Succeeded by: Sergey Kolomytsev

Chief of Criminal Police Department of Voronezh Oblast
- In office 2008–2011
- Preceded by: -
- Succeeded by: -

Personal details
- Born: 11 February 1964 (age 62) Oryol Oblast, Russia

Lieutenant-General Anatoly Ivanovich Yakunin (Анатолий Иванович Якунин; born February 11, 1964) is a Russian police officer who was Moscow Police Commissioner (June 2012-September 2016). Previously, he was the Chief of Police in Novgorod Oblast (2008-2012).

== Biography ==
Anatoly Yakunin was born on February 11, 1964, in Krivtsovo-Plota village in the Dolzhan region in Oryol Oblast, Russian SFSR, Soviet Union.

Anatoly Yakunin has a law degree. He graduated from the Academy of Interior Ministry of Russia, and then the Academy of Public Administration under the President of Russia.

His service in the Soviet Police began in the Dolzhan Region Police Department as a local inspector at the police station.

Doing more than 20 years of service in the police, he rose from an ordinary police officer to the head of Police departments in the regional level.

He held the post of Head of the Chief Directorate for Combating Organized Crime and the Chief of the Criminal Police Department of the Oryol Oblast. Then he served as first deputy chief and the Chief of the Criminal Police Department in the Voronezh Oblast.

From April 2011 to May 2012 he served as the Chief of Police in Novgorod Oblast, in his first office as Chief of Police.

On June 2, 2012, the Russian President, Vladimir Putin signed a decree on the appointment of Major-General Anatoly Ivanovich Yakunin, as the Chief of the Moscow Police (Officially, Head of MVD Directorate in Moscow).

In April 2020, Anatoly was appointed Deputy Director of the Federal Correctional Service.

== Income and property ==
Journalists from The New Times reported that Yakunin owned a mansion under construction in the Veshki cottage settlement in Moscow Oblast, two kilometres from Moscow, an area long favoured by high-ranking officials, primarily from the security services. According to builders interviewed by the magazine's correspondents, the construction cost was approximately US$500,000, excluding the cost of the land. According to an extract from Rosreestr, the plot on which Yakunin's cottage was being built had originally been designated for the "placement of a consumer services facility".

According to his 2015 income declaration, Yakunin earned 2.2 million rubles during the reporting period. His wife Irina, who worked as head of a directorate within the Department of Social Development and Corporate Culture at Rosneft, earned 9.7 million rubles that year. Even taken together, however, this income would not appear to have been sufficient to finance construction of the new cottage, estimated at 32 million rubles. The family also owned an apartment in Moscow (142 m²), a UAZ Hunter vehicle, a BMW K 1600 GTL motorcycle (worth about 2 million rubles), and leased a 0.2-hectare plot of land in Veshki.

== Corruption allegations ==
On 22 February 2016, the street racer Erik Davidych (Erik Kituashvili) stated in court that certain senior officials had paid especially large bribes in exchange for their appointments. In response, three senior officials, including Yakunin, filed a civil suit against Kituashvili for the protection of honour and dignity; the court ruled in their favour. Criminal defamation charges were later brought against the activist in connection with these allegations.

== Honors and awards ==
He was awarded the state award:

- Medal "For Distinction in the Protection of Public Order"
- The badge "Honorary Worker of the Interior Ministry"

Civic offices
Preceded by Viktor Golovanov	Police Commissioner of Moscow; Since 2012	Succeeded by Oleg Baranov
