= Moscow City Police =

Police force

Moscow Police / Main Directorate of the Ministry of Internal Affairs of Russia for the City of Moscow Московская полиция / Главное управление Министерства внутренних дел Российской Федерации по городу Москве
- Moscow Police emblem
- Common name: Moscow Police
- Abbreviation: GU MVD of Russia for Moscow
- Motto: Служим России, служим Закону! We serve Russia, we serve the Law!

Agency overview
- Formed: January 19, 1722; 304 years ago
- Employees: 80,000 (2011)

Jurisdictional structure
- Operations jurisdiction: Moscow, Russia
- Area: 1,091 km2 (421.2 sq mi)
- Population: 11,514,300
- Legal jurisdiction: As per operations jurisdiction
- Governing body: Ministry of Internal Affairs of Russia
- General nature: Local civilian police

Operational structure
- Overseen by: Government of Moscow
- Headquarters: 38 Petrovka Street, Tverskoy District, Central Administrative Okrug, Moscow
- Police officers: 50,500 (2010)
- Chief responsible: Oleg Baranov
- Parent agency: Ministry of Internal Affairs
- Units: List: Aviation; Crime Scene; MUR

Website
- Official site

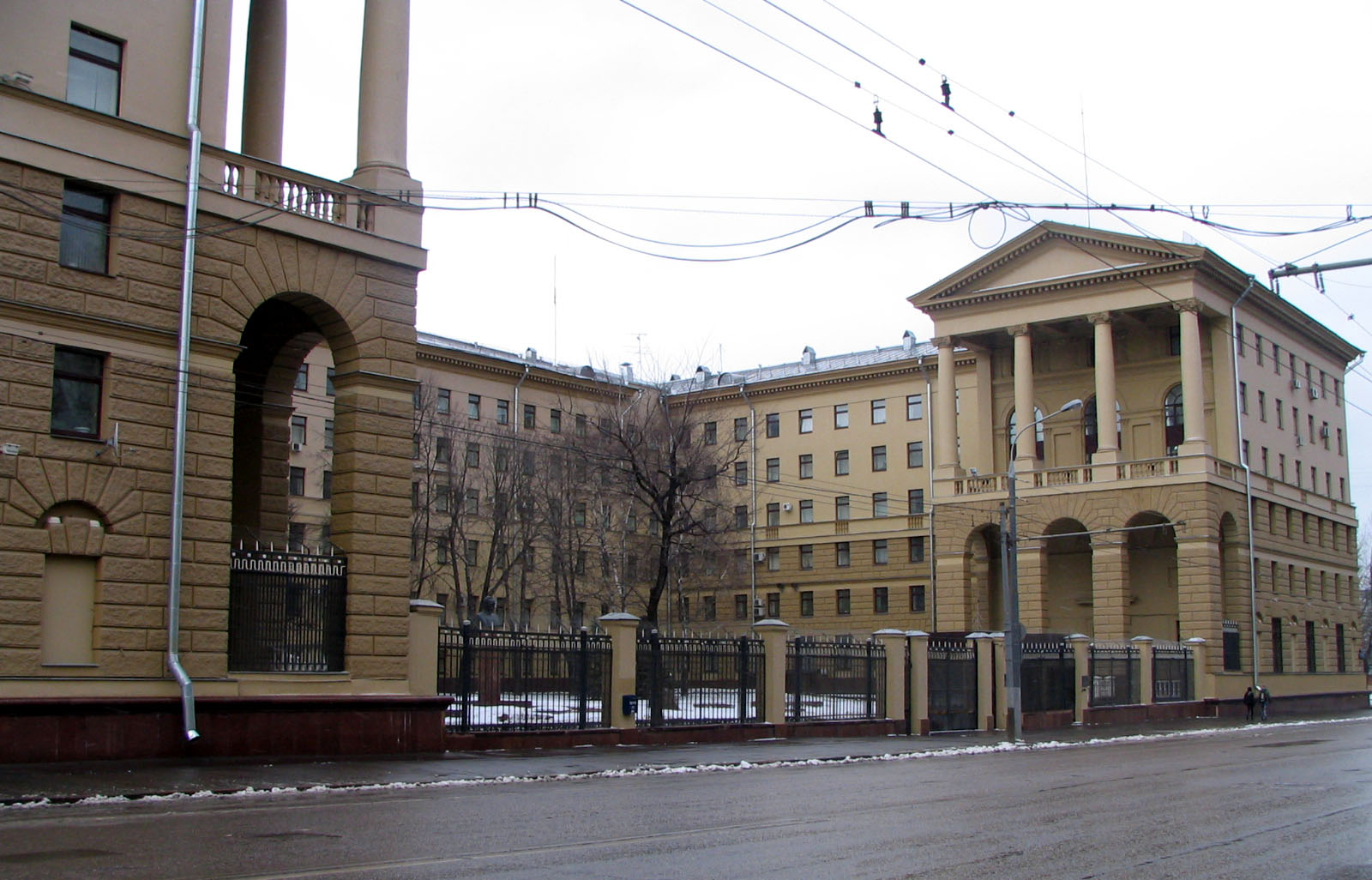
Moscow Police HQ, Petrovka 38, Tverskoy District.

The Main Directorate of the Ministry of Internal Affairs of Russia for the City of Moscow (Russian: Главное управление МВД России по г. Москве), commonly referred to as the Moscow Police (Russian: Московская полиция), is the territorial police authority of the Ministry of Internal Affairs of Russia for Moscow, Russia.

The directorate is the largest regional police authority in Russia with 50,500 officers as of 2010, with primary responsibilities in law enforcement, the detection and investigation of crime, and protection of public order in the Federal City of Moscow. It is part of the Ministry of Internal Affairs (MVD), with its headquarters located at 38 Petrovka Street in Tverskoy District, Moscow. The directorate is headed by a chief appointed by the President of Russia, on the recommendation of the Minister of Internal Affairs. Oleg Baranov was appointed chief on 23 September 2016.

The Moscow Police was established in 1722, and is one of the oldest police forces in Russia and the world. During the Soviet era, the service was known as the Moscow Municipal Militsiya (Russian: Муниципальная милиция, Москва) until 2011, when it was given its current name by then-President Dmitry Medvedev in the Russian police reform.

== History ==
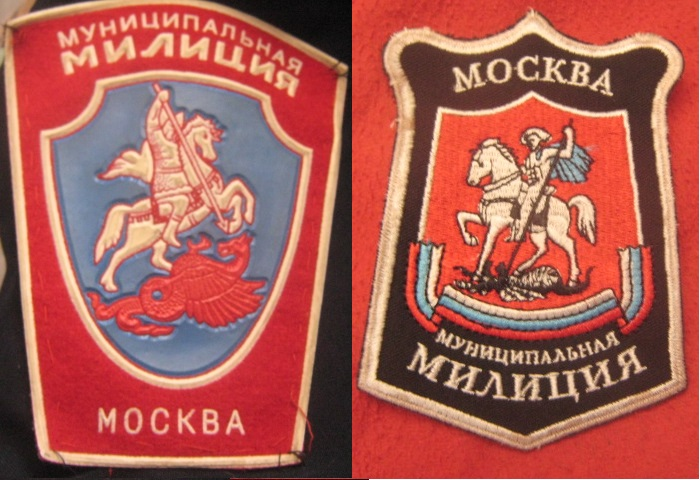
Moscow Municipal Militia patches from the 1990s.

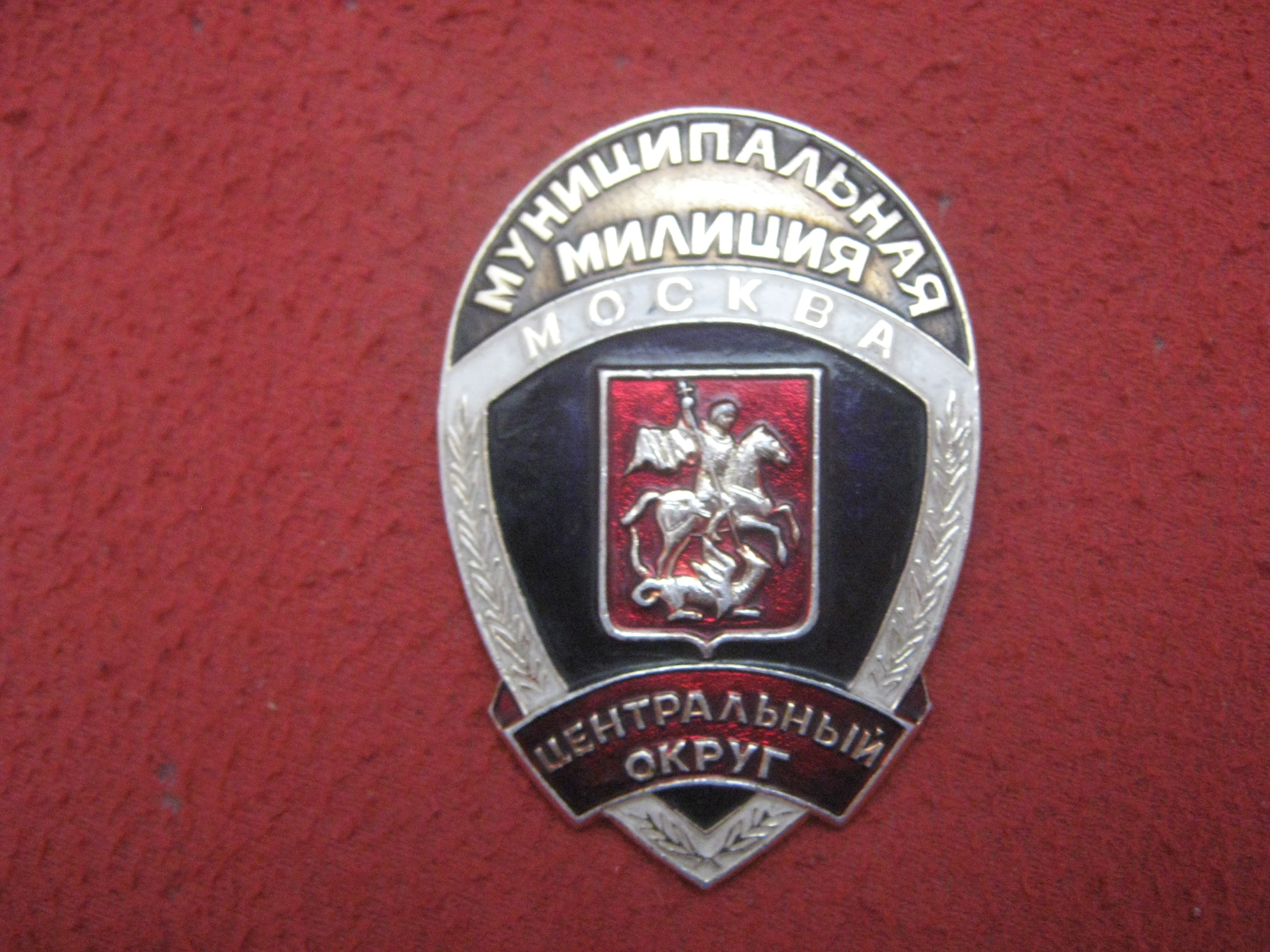
Moscow Municipal Militia Central District breastplate issued until 2011.

The first municipal police in Moscow was established on 19 January 1722, during the reign of Peter I.

On 28 October 1917, by the direction of People's Commissars, was issued a decree On the workers as the new Soviet police. The workers' militia was renamed to the Soviet of Workers' and Soldiers' Deputies militia.

In 1946, a law was passed that transformed the Council of People's Commissars into the Council of Ministers, coinciding with the reorganization of the People's Committee of Internal Affairs into the Ministry of Interior, respectively, the city committee of the NKVD was reorganized into the Office of Internal Affairs.

In 1973, the Office of Internal Affairs of Moscow City was transformed into the Main Department of Internal Affairs (GUVD), and regional offices - in the Interior Department.

In 2011, the Militsiya became the Politsiya (Полиция) as the Russian police reform initiated by President Dmitry Medvedev began to improve the efficiency of Russia's police forces. In addition, he ordered the resignation of certain high-ranking police officers.

== Structure ==
=== 1st Operational Regiment (mounted police) ===
The First Operational Regiment (mounted police) (Russian: Первый оперативный полк (конная полиция)) is responsible for patrolling parks, preventing crime and maintaining order at public events (invasion, and other major music and sporting events). In the "mounted police" in Moscow are about 1,000 policemen and 255 horses.

The HQ Located on Airport Street, Viktorenko 10.

=== 2nd Regiment of operational police ===
Two operational regiment of militia police in Moscow (Russian: 2-й оперативный полк полиция ГУВД по г. Москве) - formed in 2004 merging the three regiments of militsiya (now police) operating in Moscow, responsible for patrol services. The main task is to ensure public order during mass events in Moscow. Also, staff of the 2nd Regiment of operational police are devoted to power support various departments of the criminal police.

The unit reports directly to the police leadership and the Moscow Police Directorate of public order Directorate for Public Order (Russian: Управление обеспечения общественного порядка) (UOOP). It is the second largest unit in the Moscow Police after the Moscow riot police.

=== Zonal center for dogs trainers ===
Zonal dog service center (Russian: Зональный центр кинологической службы) - is the largest center for the training of dogs in Moscow. Dogs are trained for different purposes: search for narcotics, explosives, firearms and the search for the detention. The dogs are in the nursery not far from Moscow in two-story cages, separated by areas of work. Dogs who are seeking weapons of living apart from the dogs involved in detention. Used breeds - German Shepherd, Giant Schnauzer, Doberman, Labrador, Setter, and others.

The center is located in Veterinary part, a platform for training at the detention area for training to find explosives, Veterinary part, "maternity hospital" and "Kindergarten" and "nursing home" for dogs who retired. On the one dog running a dog specialist. They work all their lives together.

=== MUR ===
Moscow Criminal Investigations Department (Russian: МУР, Московский уголовный розыск) is a division of the Main Department of Internal Affairs in Moscow. It includes the Criminal Investigation Department of the Moscow police and the criminal investigation division of district and municipal law enforcement agencies. The head of the department is Oleg Baranov (since 2011).

The Moscow CID's roots are from the Moscow detective prikaz (Russian: Сыскной приказ) of the Grand Duchy of Moscow, which was established in 1619, replacing the interrogation mission (Russian: Розыскная экспедиция established in 1763.

In 1782, the Bureau of Criminal Affairs (Палата уголовных дел) was established and it was the Moscow department of the Russian gendarmerie.

=== Divisions ===
==== Directorate for Public Order ====
Directorate for Public Order (Russian: Управление обеспечения общественного порядка). Managing the maintenance of public order in Moscow. Head of Department - Colonel Alexander D. Blagov. Main Purposes:

- Organization of the patrol service orders;
- Organization to ensure security for the cultural and socio-political activities;
- Organization to ensure safety during sports activities.

==== Riot Police unit ====
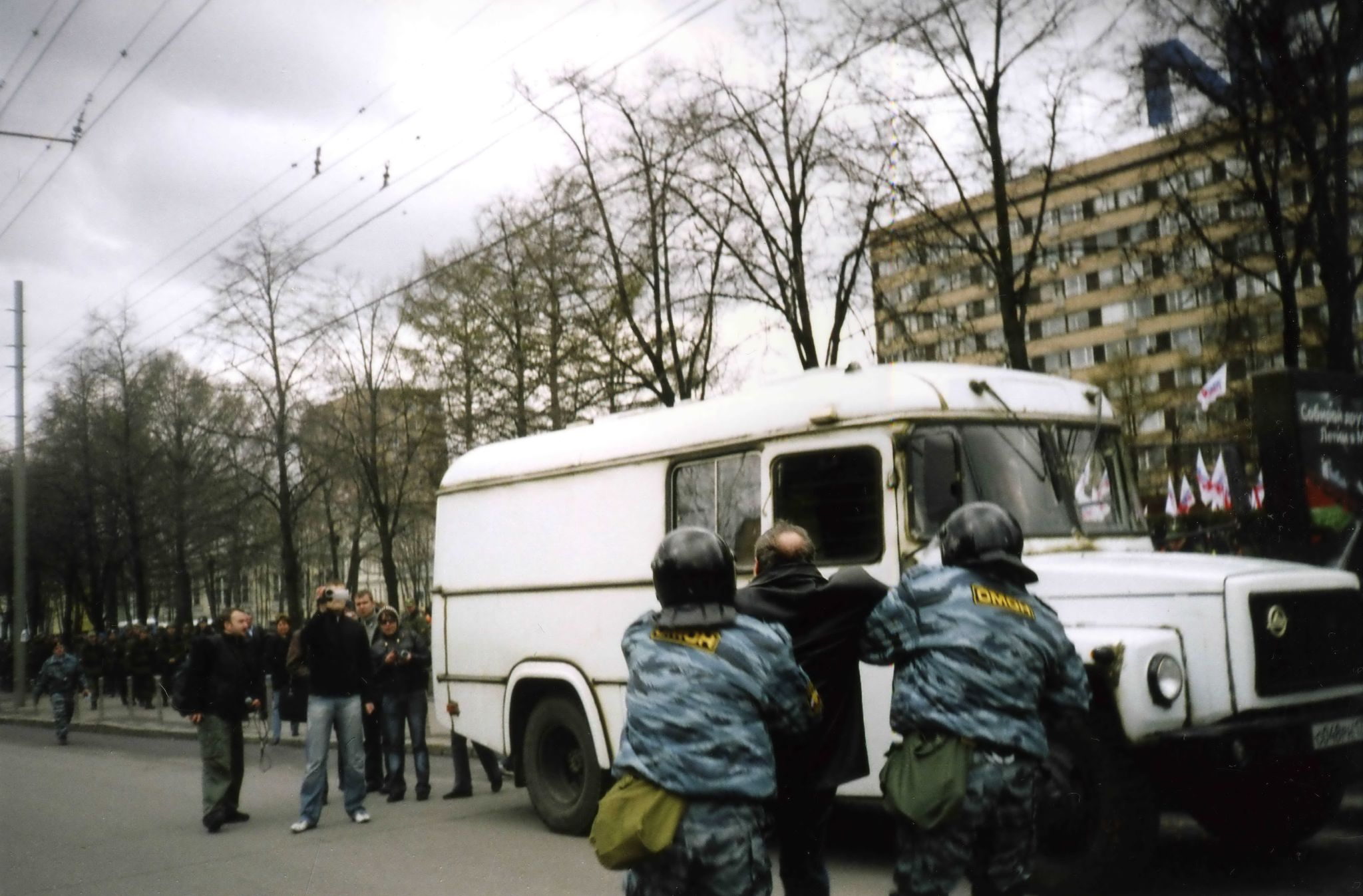
Riot Police making arrests during the Dissenters March, 2007

On 23 October 1987, on the basis of the 2nd Regiment patrol by the order of USSR Interior Ministry was created a special police squad assignment - OMON. The main tasks - providing security for the various events, saving lives during emergencies and disasters and epidemiological aggravations, etc.

== Moscow City Police Commissioners ==
Police Commissioner of the City of Moscow
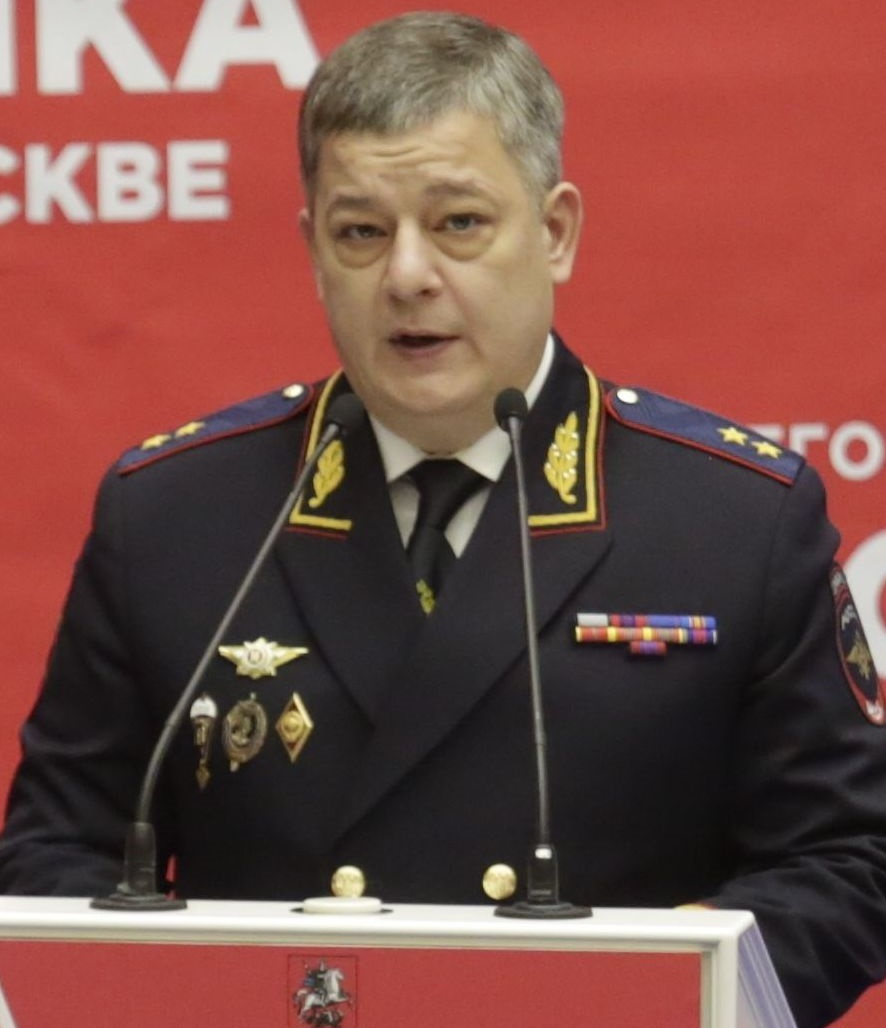
- Incumbent; Oleg Baranov since September 23, 2016
- Style: The Honorable
- Appointer: Mayor of Moscow
- Term length: Five years; Renewable at Mayor's pleasure
- Constituting instrument: Moscow Charter
- Inaugural holder: Maxim Grekov (as Chief of St Petersburg Police)
- Formation: January 19, 1722
- Deputy: Deputy, Chief of Police
- Website: Office of Commissioner

The Moscow City Police Commissioner (Officially Head of Internal Affairs of Moscow) is the head of the Moscow City Police. The Commissioner is appointed by the Mayor of Moscow, and serves at the Mayor's pleasure. The Commissioner is responsible for the day-to-day operation of the department as well as the appointment of deputies and subordinate officers. The Commissioner is a policeman administrator appointed by the Mayor of Moscow, after the approvement of the Moscow City Duma, by recommendation of the President of Russia. There is a separate position of Chief of Police, the holder of which serves as the Deputy to the Head of Internal Affairs.

The current Commissioner is Oleg Baranov, who was appointed by Mayor Sergey Sobyanin and took office on 23 September 2016. The longest serving Commissioner are Nikolai Arapov and Lev Tsinskiy who served for 12 years (1866-1878 and 1833-1845, respectively).

=== Oberpolizmeister ===
- Maxim Grekov (1722–1728)
- Ivan Pozdnyakov (1729–1731)
- Stepan Grekov (1731–1732)
- Nikita Obloduev (1733–1739)
- Ivan Golokhvastov (1749–1753)
- Ivan Divov (1792)
- Ivan Yushkov (1762–1764)
- Taras Arseniev (1764–1765)
- Vasily Tolstoy (1765–1770)
- Nikolay Bakhmetev (1770–1771)
- Nikolai Arkharov (1771–1781)
- Boris Ostrovskiy (1781–1785)
- Feodor Tol (1785–1790)
- Pavel Glazov (1790–1793)
- Pavel Kozlov (1793–1796)
- Pavel Kaverin (1797–1798; 1801–1802)
- Feodor Ertel (1798–1801)
- Grigory Spiridov (1802–1804)
- Aleksander Balashov (1804–1807)
- Ivan Gladkov (1807–1809)
- Pyotr Ivashkin (1809–1816)
- Aleksander Shulgin (1816–1825)
- Dmitry Shulgin (1825–1830)
- Sergei Mukhanov (1830–1833)
- Lev Tsinskiy (1833–1845)
- Ivan Luzhin (1845–1854)
- Alexey Timasshev-Bering (1854–1857)
- Alexey Kropotkin (1858–1860)
- Aleksander Potapov (1860–1861)
- Heinrich Kreiz (1861–1866)
- Nikolai Arapov (1866–1878)
- Aleksander Kozlov (1878–1881; 1882–1887)
- Evgeniy Yankovskiy (1881–1882)
- Evgeniy Yurkovskiy (1887–1891)
- Alexander Vlasovskiy (1891–1896)
- Dmitry Trepov (1896–1905)
- Nikolai Arkharov (1775–1782)

=== Heads of Internal affairs of Moscow City Committee ===
- Samokhvalov Vadim G. (1973 - September 1979)
- Trushin Vasily Petrovich (1979 - January 1984)
- Borisenkov Vladimir G. (1984 - August 1986)
- Peter S. Bogdanov (1986 - April 1991)
- Myrikov Nikolai Stepanovich (April - September 1991)

=== Heads of the Moscow Internal Affairs Main Dept. ===
- Murashev Arkady (September 1991 - November 9, 1992)
- Pankratov, Vladimir I. (1991 - 2 March 1995)
- Kulikov Nikolay (1995 - December 4, 1999)
- Shvidkin Viktor Andreevich (1999–2001)
- Vladimir Pronin (July 24, 2001 - April 28, 2009)
- Ivanov, Alexander Kuzmich (April 4, 2009 - September 7, 2009)
- Vladimir Kolokoltsev (September 7, 2009 - March 24, 2011).

=== Moscow Police Commissioner ===
- Vladimir Kolokoltsev (March 24, 2011 - May 21, 2012)
- Viktor Golovanov (Acting; May 21 - June 2, 2012)
- Anatoly Yakunin (Since June 2, 2012 - September 23, 2016)
- Oleg Baranov (Since September 23, 2016)

== Gallery ==
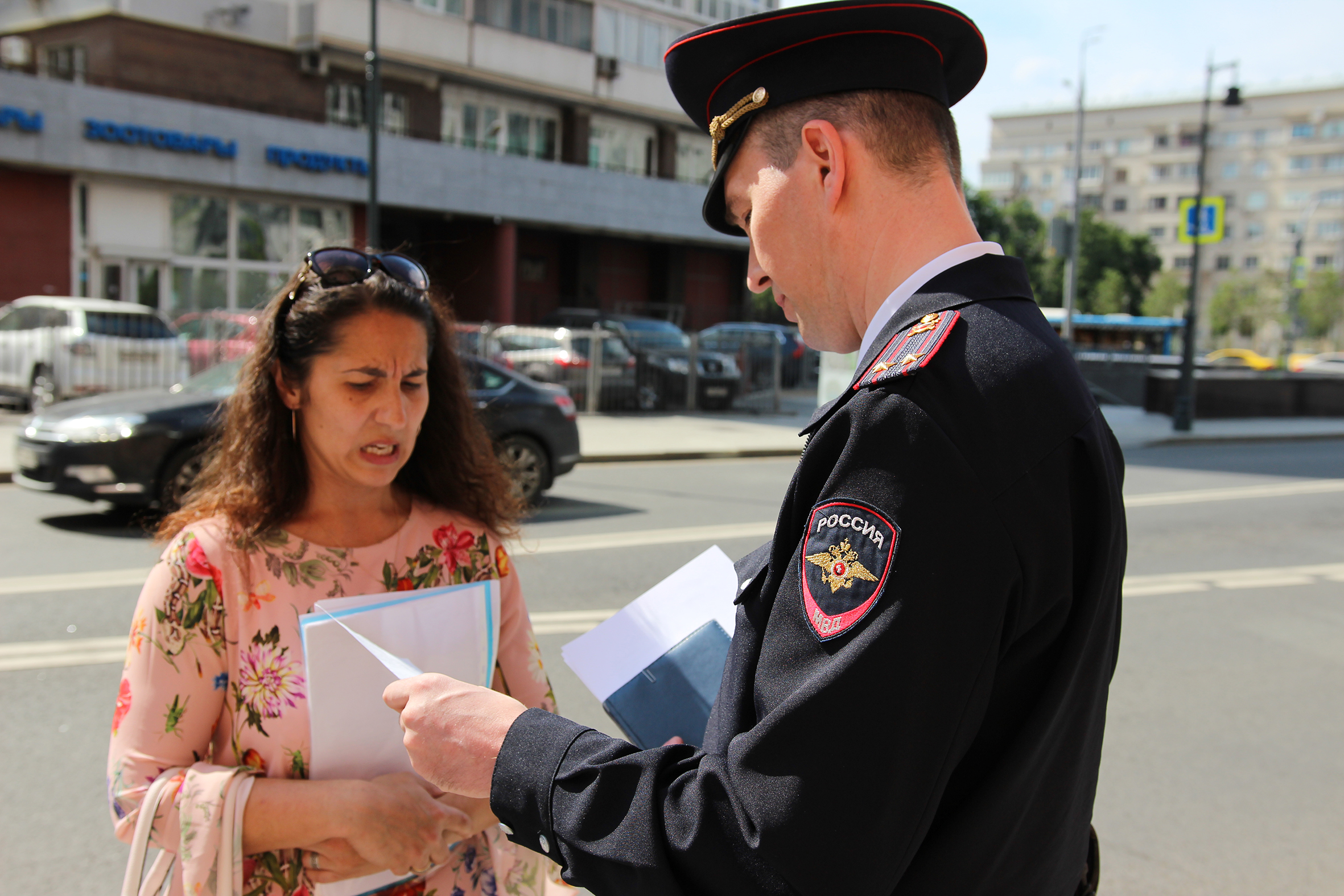
A police officer on duty

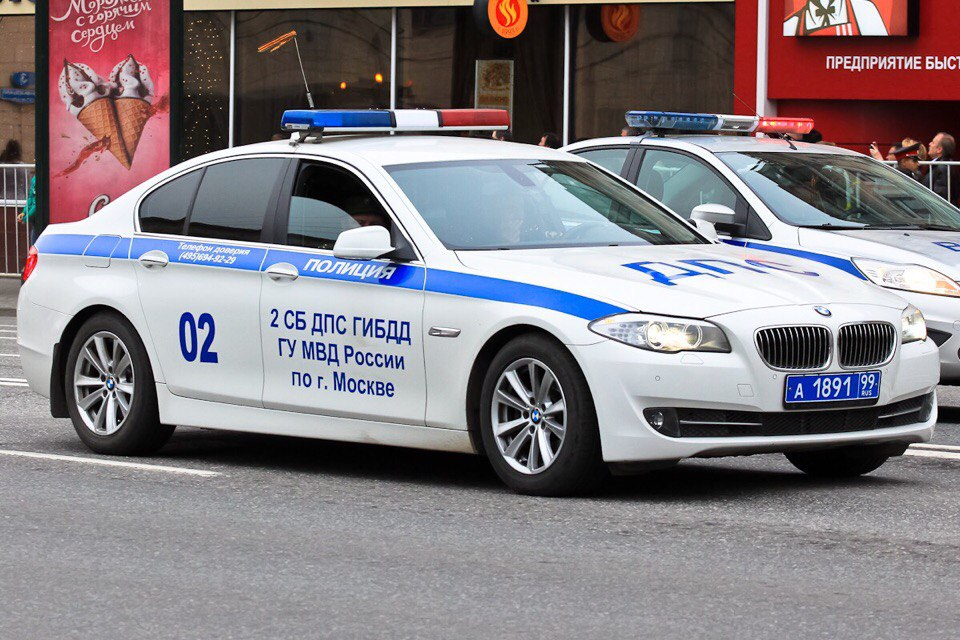
Moscow police BMW 5 Series car

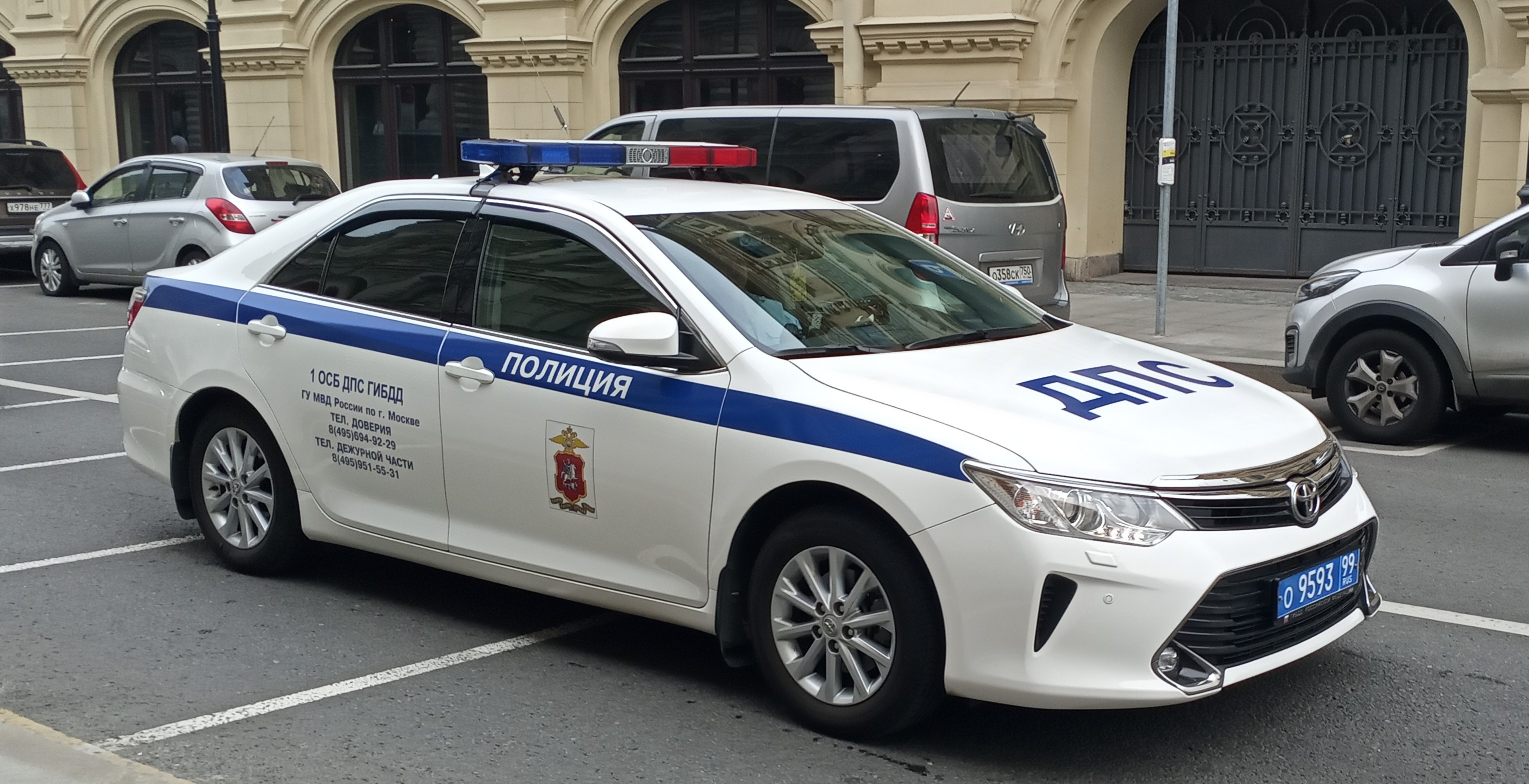
Moscow police Toyota Camry car

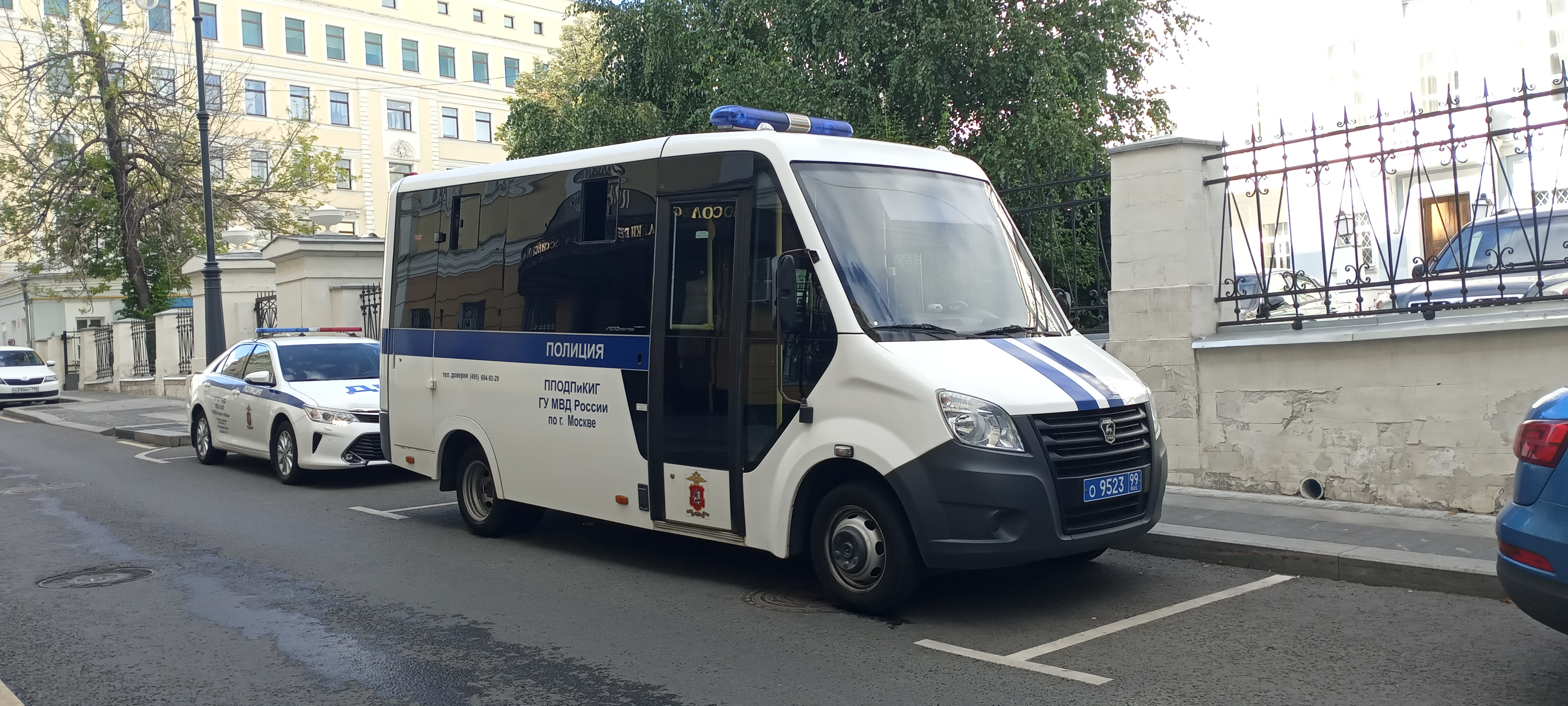
A GAZelle NEXT police van

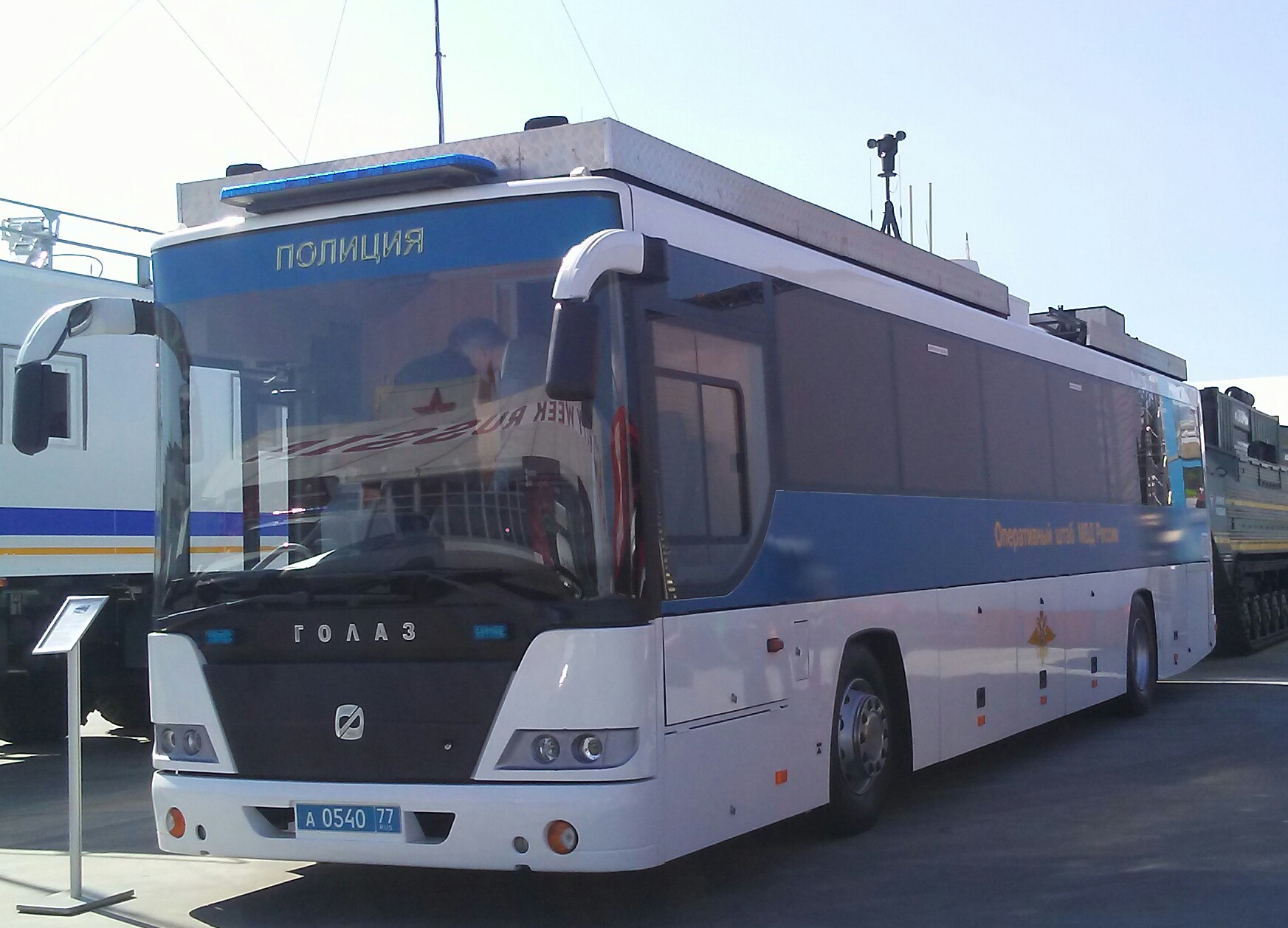
Moscow police GolAZ-5251 bus

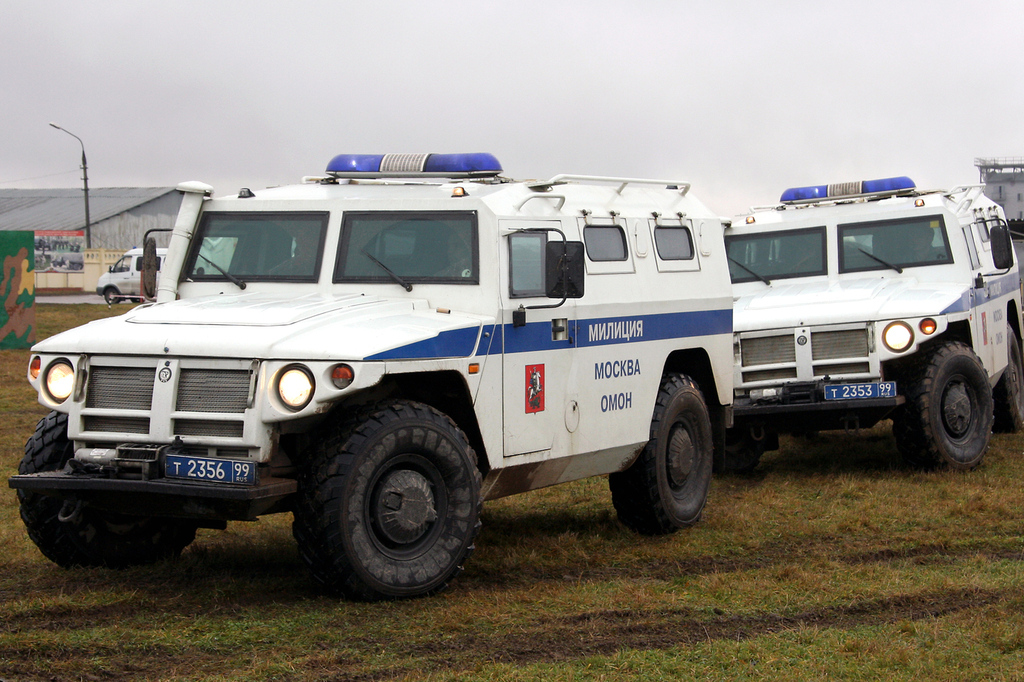
ГАЗ-233034 Moscow OMON SPM-1

== See also ==
- Category:Fictional portrayals of the Moscow City Police
- Police of Russia
- Saint Petersburg Police
- Militsiya
