= Viktor Golovanov =

Viktor Golovanov Виктор Голованов

Police Commissioner of Moscow
- In office 21 May – June 2, 2012
- Preceded by: Vladimir Kolokoltsev
- Succeeded by: Anatoly Yakunin

Personal details
- Born: 2 May 1959 (age 66) Nizhny Lomov, Russia

Lieutenant-General Viktor Vladimirovich Golovanov (Виктор Владимирович Голованов; born May 2, 1959, in Moscow, Russia) is a Russian police officer who was the acting Moscow Police Commissioner (May–June 2012), after the previous chief Vladimir Kolokoltsev was appointed as the Federal Minister for Internal Affairs.

== Biography ==
Golovanov was born on May 2, 1959, in Moscow. He is in police service from 1980 and started his career from the position of policeman in police station no. 125 of Moscow. He has been on positions from 1990:

- From 1996 until 2000, he was on the position of the deputy chief of Criminal Police – the chief of Criminal Investigation Department of Moscow Police;
- In 2000, he was dismissed from police. From 2000 until 2003 he temporarily did not work;
- In 2003, he was appointed to the position of the chief of Criminal Investigation Department of Moscow Police;
- In 2011 he was appointed by the Presidential Decree to the position of the deputy chief of Moscow Police Department.
- Between May and June 2012, he was appointed by Interior Minister as the acting Moscow Police Commissioner

== Personal life ==
During his police service Golovanov was decorated with many awards.

Civic offices
Preceded by Vladimir Kolokoltsev	Police Commissioner of Moscow; 21 May – 2 June 2012	Succeeded by Anatoly Yakunin
