= Zholobov =

Zholobov Жолобов
- Khutor
- Location within Volgograd Oblast Location within Russia
- Coordinates: 49°51′N 46°35′E
- Country: Russia
- Region: Volgograd Oblast
- District: Pallasovsky District
- Time zone: UTC+4:00

Zholobov (Russian: Жолобов) is a rural locality (a khutor) in Krasnooktyabrskoye Rural Settlement, Pallasovsky District, Volgograd Oblast, Russia. The population was 243 as of 2010. There are 4 streets.

== Geography ==
Zholobov is located in steppe, 45 km southwest of Pallasovka (the district's administrative centre) by road. Krasny Oktyabr is the nearest rural locality.
