= Nikolai Arkharov =

Russian police chief (1740–1814)

- Николай Архаров
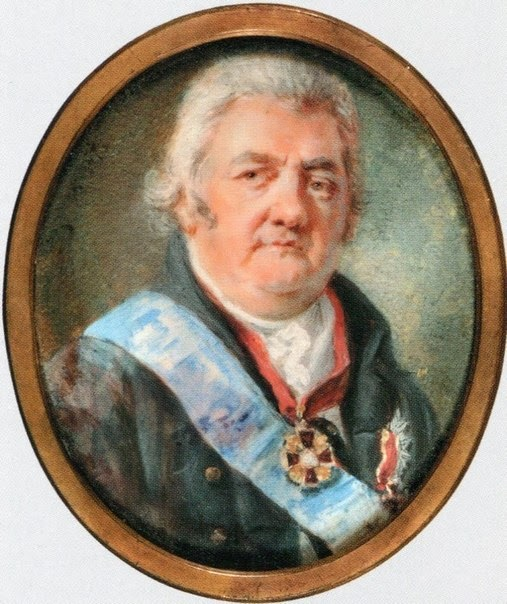
- Born: 7 May 1740
- Died: 10 January 1814 (aged 73)
- Occupation: Chief of police

Nikolai Petrovich Arkharov (Russian: Никола́й Петро́вич Арха́ров; 18 May [O.S. 7 May] 1740 – January 1814) was a Russian chief of police best known for having given his name to the Russian term arkharovtsy, an ironic appellation of policemen.

== Biography ==
Nikolai Arkharov came from a noble family. In 1754 he was enrolled at the Guards, in 1756 started the service as soldier of the Preobrazhensky regiment and in 1761 was promoted to officer.

His rising began after the mission of 1771 into Moscow, enveloped by the disastrous epidemic of plague and mutiny (known as the Plague Riot), under the direction of Count Grigori Orlov. Count Orlov arrived to Moscow on 26 September 1771 with numerous doctors and four Guards regiments. Arkharov proved himself as energetic and executive officer. Apparently, with the aid of Orlov, with whom he was familiar earlier, Arkharov was transferred into the police with the rank of colonel.

After the successfully conducted inquest of the case of Yemelyan Pugachev Arkharov was appointed in 1775 the Chief of police in Moscow. Here he distinguished himself as one of the best detective of that time. His subordinates were called by people "arkharovtsy" - this word in the course of time became nominal. Catherine II sometimes invited Arkharov into Petersburg for the investigation of serious thefts.

On 28 July 1777 he became major general, in 1779 received the Order of St. Anna of the 1st degree and from 1782, he was a Moscow governor. In 1783 Arkharov was elevated into general-ensign, in 1785 became the general-governor of Tver and Novgorod. From 1790 he was also the director of the water communications and significantly contributed to the canal-building in his region.

From 1795 to 1796 he was General Governor of St Petersburg. Upon his accession to the throne, Emperor Paul I awarded Arkharov the Order of Alexander Nevsky, promoted him to full general and appointed him the second general governor of St Petersburg (the first was Grand Prince Alexandr Pavlovich).

On 15 June 1797 Arkharov was dismissed and was exiled into Tambov governorate without the right to visit both the capitals. This right was returned to him in the next reign.

Nikolai Arkharov died and buried in his estate Rasskazovo near Tambov.
