= German Kudryashov =

Russian footballer

Personal information
- Full name: German Nikolayevich Kudryashov
- Date of birth: 26 September 1964 (age 62)
- Place of birth: Moscow, Russian SFSR
- Height: 1.79 m (5 ft 10 1/2 in)
- Position: Defender

Youth career
- FC Iskra Moscow

Senior career*
| Years | Team | Apps | (Gls) |
| 1983 | FC FShM Moscow | 20 | (0) |
| 1984 | FC Zorky Krasnogorsk | 33 | (0) |
| 1985–1991 | FC Dynamo Bryansk | 178 | (6) |
| 1991–1992 | FC Kuban Krasnodar | 14 | (0) |
| 1992 | FC Niva Slavyansk-na-Kubani | 1 | (0) |
| 2007 | FC Lokomotiv Bryansk | | |
| 2008 | FC Zenit Zhukovka | | |
- * Club domestic league appearances and goals

German Nikolayevich Kudryashov (Russian: Герман Николаевич Кудряшов; born 26 September 1964 in Moscow) is a former Russian football player.
