= Igor Neuchev =

Russian footballer

Personal information
- Full name: Igor Nikolayevich Neuchev
- Date of birth: 27 October 1974 (age 52)
- Place of birth: Tambov, Russian SFSR
- Height: 1.75 m (5 ft 9 in)
- Position: Midfielder

Team information
- Current team: FC Spartak Tambov (assistant manager)

Senior career*
Years	Team	Apps	(Gls)
1992	FC Spartak Tambov	40	(1)
1993–1995	FC Spartak Anapa	113	(19)
1996–1999	FC Fakel Voronezh	117	(8)
2000	FC Metallurg Lipetsk	31	(1)
2001–2005	FC Sodovik Sterlitamak	147	(19)
2006	FC Gazovik Orenburg	20	(1)
2007–2010	FC Spartak Tambov	77	(6)

Managerial career
- 2015–2016: FC Tambov-M (assistant)
- 2016–2019: FC Tambov-M
- 2019–2020: FC Tambov (assistant)
- 2020–2022: Akademiya Futbola Tambov
- 2022: FC Spartak Tambov
- 2022–: FC Spartak Tambov (assistant)
- * Club domestic league appearances and goals

Igor Nikolayevich Neuchev (Russian: Игорь Николаевич Неучев; born 27 October 1974) is a Russian professional football coach and a former player. He is the assistant manager of FC Spartak Tambov.

== Club career ==
He made his debut in the Russian Premier League in 1997 for FC Fakel Voronezh.
