= Igor Uporov =

Russian lawyer (born 1965)

- Born: September 4, 1965 (age 61); Tambov, Russia
- Occupation: Lawyer
- Spouse: Larisa G.
- Children: 2
- Relatives: Uporov Nicholas G.(father), Uporova Raisa I. (mother)
- Website: www.uporov.com, www.uporov.ru

Igor Uporov (in Russian — Igor Nikolaevich Uporov) was born on September 4, 1965, in Tambov province, Russia. He is a Russian advocate, a former colonel, and a president and founder of The Ural-Siberian Bar Association.

== Biography ==
In 1982, Igor graduated from school #13 in the town of Irbit, which is in the Sverdlovsk Region. Soon after, he started his first job at the Irbit motorcycle plant. In 1983, he enrolled at Sverdlovsk Polytechnical University of the Ministry of Internal affairs of USSR where he earned his first technical education.

Igor began serving the army in subunits of the Ministry of Internal affairs, Russian Federation in 1986. Igor then graduated from The Academy of Ministry of Internal Affairs, USSR, Yekaterinburg City with a degree in law while continuing his work simultaneously. From 1992 to 1997, He served various divisions of the Department of Internal Affairs, Nizhni Tagil.

After many years, gaining experience and doing legal work, Igor Uporov became a member of Sverdlovsk region Bar in 1999. As an advocate, he earned considerable experience representing legal entities and citizens, in Arbitration courts, courts of general jurisdiction, Supreme Arbitration Court, and the Civil board of the Supreme Court of Russia.

In 2004 Advocate Igor Uporov was appointed as the leader of the legal department of the regional center of the Ministry of Emergency Measures of Russia. At this time, he gave up his advocate status to serve the Government of The Russian Federation.

During the years from 2004 to 2011 Igor Uporov served the Federal Government bodies and then retired with the rank of colonel in the Internal Service, and chief of Legal Department of The Ural Regional Center Ministry of Emergency Measures in Russia. In serving the Russian Government, Igor Uporov participated in more than two thousand judicial sessions, where he personally represented the interests of the regional center and territorial bodies of the Minister of the Ministry Emergency Measures of Russia.

On September 2, 2011, Igor Uporov founded Ural Siberian Bar Association and become its president. The Ural Siberian Bar Association gathers experienced Advocates to provide Legal Representation to clients in various courts and government entities of Moscow, St. Petersburg, Samara, Penza, Orenburg, Kurgan, Khanty-Mansisk, Izhevsk, Tolyatti, and Omsk.

Unity represents foreign citizens and foreign legal entities on the territory of Russian Federation: among them, clients from United States, Canada, Czech Republic, and Italy. Igor Uporov has represented legal entities’ interests and has experience dealing with bodies of Federal Antimonopoly service, the Ministry of Internal Affairs, Federal Tax service, Federal Service of Execution of Punishments, Public Prosecutor's office of Russia, Investigatory Committee of Russia, Russian Financial Supervision, Russian Defensive Order, and Russian Consumer Supervision.

Igor Uporov is now specializing in Arbitration, Administrative cases, Civil and Criminal Litigation, Contractual Law, Labor Disputes, Military Law Disputes, Business Immigration, Export-Import legal support, Immigration Services.

Igor Uporov was honored with 15 medals and distinctions, an honorary diploma from the Minister for diligent service, and ensuring of legal safety in the system of the Ministry of Internal Affairs and the Ministry of Emergency Measures of the Russian Federation. He also earned more than 20 other encouragements, gratitude, and certificates.

Igor Uporov constantly participates in seminars, symposiums, legal conferences to improve his legal qualification and share professional experience with colleagues. Igor Uporov is getting a third education in State and Municipal Government major at Ural Academy of Public service. He publishes his articles, speaks on television, and gives comments on the most difficult and significant legal problems of society today.

Igor Uporov is currently the President of Ural-Siberian Bar Association.

In April 2010, on TV "Channel 4" Igor Uporov gave his analysis of the car accident in Ekaterinburg that caused the death of young girl.

In 2011, Igor Uporov repeatedly consulted the journalists of the newspaper "Vedomosti Ural".

He also participated in fifth session of the Euro-Asian Juridical Congress, held 26–27 May 2011 in Yekaterinburg.

The conference program «The image of the Sverdlovsk region. Promotion tools, capacity, forecasts and projections»

Took part in the Innoprom of the conference "Image of the Sverdlovsk region. Promotion tools, capacity, forecasts and projections."

September, 2011, Igor Uporov participated in a round table of the Legislative Assembly of Sverdlovsk region, to highlight the problem of enforcement against corporate raiding and corruption in Yekaterinburg and the Sverdlovsk region.

October, 2011, Igor Uporov participated in the attorney press conference, devoted to the problem of extortion from motorists for illegal parking in Yekaterinburg.
