= Maria Zholobova =

Maria Viktorovna Zholobova (born 1989) is a Russian investigative journalist. She is a journalist for the publication Important Stories. She is the co-founder and former journalist for the publication Proekt. She is the former presenter and writer of the program “Fake News” on the TV Rain channel.

== Education ==
She received a master's degree from the Institute of Journalism and Literary Creativity in Moscow.

== Career ==
She started working in the newspaper "Kommersant", where she was a news editor. In September 2013, Kommersant sent Zholobov to a lecture by Dmitry Peskov, press secretary of Russian President Vladimir Putin. At the lecture, Peskov said that Putin does not pronounce the name of the Russian oppositionist Alexei Navalny so as not to make Navalny popular. Zholobova published it on the Kommersant website and was fired, and her article was deleted, as it turned out that the lecture was not public.

Later, she worked at Esquire and Slon (Republic). In 2014, she joined RBC. In 2016, she left RBC and moved to TV Rain channel. On "Rain" she composed and hosted the program Fake News ("Fake News"), where she talked about inaccuracies in the reports of the Russian media. Investigated various topics, from infrastructure and crime problems in Russia to Putin's inner circle and hidden assets of civil servants. In August 2018, Zholobova moved from TV Rain to Project, a Russian startup modeled on the American non-profit organization ProPublica.

== Investigative stories ==
In August 2017, TV Rain aired the first episode of the Piterskie series, which told the story of Russian businessman and Putin acquaintance Ilya Traber and his alleged ties to crime. In particular, the episode about Traber spoke of the "so-called king of gangster Petersburg." Zholobova was one of the authors of the episode. In 2017, a criminal case was opened in Russia for slander against Traber, in which Zholobova was a witness. On June 29, 2021, Russian police searched her apartment in Moscow, seizing computers, phones, memory cards, and SIM cards, and then took her in for questioning. The day before the searches, the publication of Zholobova's investigation into the alleged corruption schemes of Vladimir Kolokoltsev, the Minister of Internal Affairs of Russia, was announced. Human rights organizations International Federation of Journalists, Committee to Protect Journalists, European Federation of Journalists, Journalists and Media Workers Union, Women in Journalism Coalition and Amnesty International condemned the searches.

On July 15, 2021, the Russian Prosecutor's Office declared Proekt an "undesirable organization." Zholobova then left for Tbilisi, Georgia.
