= Pavel Bliznetsov =

Father Pavel Bliznetsov (born 26 September 1913, Tambov, Russian Empire - died on 24 September 1989, Gundelfingen, Germany) was a Russian Eastern Catholic priest.

== Biography ==
Born on 26 September 1913 in Tambov, Russian Empire. Pavel Bliznetsov was baptized and was brought up in the Orthodox faith, but as a young man lost his faith and became an atheist. He received higher education of an engineer and a military pilot during World War II and was drafted into the Red Army, but in 1942 he was captured and was put in a German concentration camp. After escaping from the camp Bliznetsov went to Rome, where he subsequently met with Philippe de Regis and converted to Catholicism. In 1951 after the end of Russicum he was ordained a priest of the Byzantine rite. Father Bliznetsov served in Fatima and Germany where he created a pastoral center in Gundelfingen (Freiburg im Breisgau). He died in Gundelfingen on 24 September 1989.

== Works ==
God's ways are inscrutable (Brussels, 1952, under the name P. Didymus)

== Sources ==
God's ways are inscrutable. - Brussels: A Life with God in 1952 (under the pseudonym P. Didymus) (Reissue - Brussels, 1995).

The Catholic Encyclopedia. T. 1. - M., 2002. pp. 616–617.
