= Aleksandr Kudryashov =

Russian footballer and manager

Personal information
- Full name: Aleksandr Viktorovich Kudryashov
- Date of birth: 3 August 1974 (age 52)
- Place of birth: Tambov, Russian SFSR
- Height: 1.85 m (6 ft 1 in)
- Positions: Defender; midfielder

Team information
- Current team: FC Spartak Tambov (assistant manager)

Senior career*
Years	Team	Apps	(Gls)
1992	FC Spartak Tambov	40	(0)
1993–1995	FC Spartak Anapa	109	(4)
1996–1999	FC Fakel Voronezh	59	(1)
2000	FC Volgar-Gazprom Astrakhan	30	(1)
2001	FC Metallurg Lipetsk	22	(2)
2002–2003	FC Fakel Voronezh	36	(0)
2003	FC Spartak Tambov	12	(0)
2004	FC Dynamo Bryansk	37	(1)
2005	FC Sodovik Sterlitamak	26	(1)
2006	FC SKA Rostov-on-Don	7	(0)
2006–2007	FC Avangard Kursk	53	(0)
2008	FC Ryazan	22	(0)
2009	FC Kyzylzhar	9	(0)
2009	FC Fakel Voronezh	3	(0)
2009	FC Ryazan	7	(0)
2010–2013	FC Fakel Voronezh	39	(0)
2013	FC Pritambovye Tambov		

Managerial career
- 2014: FC Pritambovye Tambov
- 2015–2017: Akademiya Futbola Tambov Oblast
- 2017: FC Zenit Penza (assistant)
- 2018–2023: Akademiya Futbola Tambov Oblast
- 2023–2024: FC Spartak Tambov (caretaker)
- 2024–: FC Spartak Tambov (assistant)
- * Club domestic league appearances and goals

Aleksandr Viktorovich Kudryashov (Russian: Александр Викторович Кудряшов; born 3 August 1974) is a Russian professional football manager and a former player who is the assistant manager of FC Spartak Tambov.
