= Ilya Traber =

Russian criminal (born 1956)

- Born: Ilya Ilyich Traber; September 8, 1950 (age 76); Omsk, USSR
- Occupations: Businessman, Gangster, member of Tambov Gang

Ilya Ilyich Traber is a Russian businessman and antiques dealer. He is said to have close ties to the Russian mafia and to be a personal friend of President Vladimir Putin. He was named as one of the leaders of the Tambov gang, which dominated organized crime in Saint Petersburg in the 1990s.

== Biography ==
Traber is a native of Omsk and graduated from the Higher Naval School in the city of Sevastopol in Crimea. He served in the Navy of the Soviet Armed Forces in the submarine fleet and reached the rank of lieutenant. He was also a member of the Communist Party of the Soviet Union. In 1980, he left the military and went to Leningrad, where he first worked as a bartender in a beer bar and later entered the antiques trade, which is why he was later nicknamed “the Antiquary”. After the collapse of the Soviet Union, Traber was granted a monopoly on the antiques trade by the city of Saint Petersburg in 1991, which allowed him to achieve great wealth. He established close contacts in local politics and is said to have introduced Putin to Anatoly Sobchak, who later became mayor of Saint Petersburg.

His wealth enabled Traber to establish a number of other businesses and to enter the oil trade. Traber is said to have acted as the “accountant” for the Tambov gang during this time, which gained control of the port of St. Petersburg through violence and contract killings, with the support of Putin, who was working for Mayor Sobchak. Traber is said to have acted as an intermediary between the mafia and politics. At Putin's request, Traber appointed Putin's protégé Alexei Miller as port manager. Drugs are said to have been smuggled through the port in the 1990s and 2000s. Putin was responsible for the city's foreign trade during this period and in 1994 granted the Tambov gang a license to supply the city with petroleum products. In 1996, he is said to have received four percent of the profits after he had given control of the oil supply at Pulkovo Airport to members of the Tambov gang. As a good friend of Putin, Traber was the only member of the Tambov gang with whom Putin showed himself openly. Traber was a guest of honor at Putin's birthday parties at least between 2004 and 2016, even after Putin became prime minister of Russia in 1999.

He immigrated to Spain in the mid-1990s and also often resided in Switzerland and Monaco. In Western Europe, he built up a network of hundreds of companies that registered properties and then repeatedly sold them at increasing prices through straw companies controlled by the same individuals. The purpose of these constructs was alleged to be money laundering for the Russian mafia and individuals from Putin's inner circle. Traber fled back to Russia in 2016 when charges were brought against him and others in Spain for money laundering. According to intercepted conversations, Traber had profited from smuggling in the ports of Primorsk and Vyborg. In 2018, however, all persons, including Traber, were acquitted.

In 2019, Vladimir Kumarin, the leader of the Tambov group and a close associate of Traber, was sentenced to 24 years in prison in St. Petersburg for contract killings and organized crime. He had already been arrested for the first time in 2007, which was said to have been on Putin's orders. However, Traber remained in the Kremlin's favor even after that and continued to receive state contracts. He owns various assets in northwestern Russia and, according to his own statements, is one of the 40 richest entrepreneurs in Russia. After the start of the Russian invasion of Ukraine in 2022, Traber founded Leningradsky Frontier Foundation (Leningradsky Rubezh or Ленинградский рубеж), an organization in Saint Petersburg, which supports the Russian army in its war effort.

Traber was arrested in St. Petersburg by the FSB on June 17, 2026 in connection to a contract killing and subsequently moved to a detention facility in Moscow. During his time in detention Traber surrendered ownership stakes in at least four major companies. Investigators dropped all charges on August 28, 2026.
