= Chekalin (surname) =

Chekalin (masculine, Russian: Чекалин) or Chekalina (feminine, Russian: Чекалина) is a Russian surname. Notable people with the surname include:

- Alexander Chekalin (partisan) (1925–1941), Soviet partisan
- Alexander Chekalin (politician) (born 1947), Russian politician
- Valeriya Chekalina (born 1992), Russian blogger and TV anchor

== See also ==
- Chekalov
