= Alexander Chekalin =

Alexander Chekalin may refer to:

- Alexander Alexeyevich Chekalin (born 1947), First Deputy Minister of the Interior
- Alexander Pavlovich Chekalin (1925–1941), Russian teenager, Soviet partisan, and Hero of the Soviet Union
