= Viktor Vorobyov =

Russian military officer

- Виктор Воробьёв
- Born: 20 June 1948; Armavir, Krasnodar Krai, USSR
- Died: 7 January 1995 (aged 46); Grozny, Chechen Republic
- Cause of death: Mortar fire
- Burial place: Ignatyev Cemetery, Stavropol
- Military career
- Allegiance: Soviet Union; Russia
- Branch: Ministry of Internal Affairs
- Service years: 1971–1995
- Rank: Major-general
- Commands: Main Directorate for Public Order
- Conflicts: First Chechen War †

Viktor Vasilyevich Vorobyov (Russian: Виктор Васильевич Воробьёв; June 20, 1948, Armavir, Krasnodar Krai – January 7, 1995, Grozny) was the Head of the Main Directorate for Public Order of the Ministry of Internal Affairs of the Russian Federation. An officer of Soviet and Russian law enforcement agencies, a major general of police, and a participant in First Chechen War.

== Biography ==
Born in Armavir, Krasnodar Krai, in 1964 he entered the Georgievsky Technical School of Agricultural Mechanization, graduating with honors in 1968. For the following year, he worked as a mechanic at the Petrovsky state farm. From May 1969 to May 1971, he served as a sergeant major in a training division in Lutsk, Carpathian Military District.

In June 1971, he joined the internal affairs agencies, beginning his service as a junior police lieutenant and head of the Petrovsky District Department of Internal Affairs (Svetlograd). From late 1972, he worked in the criminal investigation service, with which he would spend the rest of his life. In October 1978, at the age of 30, after graduating from the Rostov Higher Police School, he was appointed head of the Petrovsky District Department of Internal Affairs. After graduating with honors from the USSR Academy of the Ministry of Internal Affairs in 1982, he was appointed Deputy Chief of the Criminal Investigation Department of the Stavropol Krai Internal Affairs Directorate. From April 1986 to June 1988, he served as Chief of the Criminal Investigation Department of the Krai Internal Affairs Directorate. From July 1988 to September 1989, he served as Chief of the Operational Group of the Krai Internal Affairs Directorate for the Caucasian Mineral Waters in Pyatigorsk (in July 1989, it was reorganized into the Internal Affairs Directorate for the Caucasian Mineral Waters). From September 1989 to February 1990, he served as Deputy Chief of the Krai Internal Affairs Directorate, and from March 1990, as First Deputy Chief of the Stavropol Krai Internal Affairs Directorate – Chief of the Criminal Police Service.

From December 1991 to June 1994, he served as Chief of the Internal Affairs Directorate of Smolensk Oblast. The special rank of "Major General of Police" was awarded by Decree of the President of the Russian Federation No. 1337 of November 8, 1992.

In June 1994, he was transferred to Moscow, to the main office of the Ministry of Internal Affairs of the Russian Federation, and appointed Chief of the Main Directorate for Public Order Protection of the Ministry of Internal Affairs of Russia.

=== Death ===
In December 1994, he was sent to the Chechen Republic, where he fought in the First Chechen War. On December 23, 1994, Major General Vorobyov took command of the Ministry of Internal Affairs of the Russian Federation group in Chechnya. The general's responsibilities included ensuring public order in territory occupied by Russian troops (establishing police checkpoints, organizing the protection of important facilities, and patrolling populated areas). However, the police units under his command (over a dozen combined OMON, SOBR, and patrol units from various provinces of Russia, approximately 600 personnel) were drawn into combat.

On the morning of January 7, 1995, Vorobyov, along with a group of officers, headed to "Svechka," a high-rise building housing the Institute of Oil and Gas, the ground floors of which were occupied by SOBR fighters. Along with them was Sergei Shevelev, a Stavropol Krai SOBR officer from the Organized Crime Control Department, and his future commander. The group's movements were spotted by militants, and they were targeted by mortar fire approximately 20-30 meters from the building. Viktor Vorobyov was killed at 8:50 a.m. Three Yaroslavl SOBR fighters were killed along with him, and only Police Colonel Sandrykin, whom Vorobyov shielded from shrapnel with his body, was wounded and survived.

He is buried in the alley of honor at the Ignatievsky (Sazhevoy) Cemetery in Stavropol.

== Awards ==
- Order "For Merit to the Fatherland", 4th Class (June 15, 1995, posthumously)
- Jubilee Medal "In Commemoration of the 100th Anniversary of the Birth of Vladimir Ilyich Lenin"
- Medal "For Outstanding Service in Maintaining Public Order"
- Medal "For Impeccable Service", 1st, 2nd, and 3rd Classes.

== Memory ==
A memorial plaque has been installed on the building of the Smolensk Oblast Directorate of the Ministry of Internal Affairs. In 2014, the Directorate also established a prize and a traveling cup in memory of General Vorobyov, awarded annually to the best territorial internal affairs agencies in the region.

In 2004, the All-Russian Public Organization of Police Veterans established a prize named after Vorobyov.

A separate display case in the Central Museum of the Ministry of Internal Affairs of Russia is dedicated to Major General of Police Vorobyov.

Combat sambo and Russian hand-to-hand combat tournaments in memory of Major General Vorobyov are held in Moscow, Stavropol, and other cities.

In Svetlograd, an avenue is named after him. A monument has been erected in front of the District Department of Internal Affairs. In Svetlograd, a police sports competition is taking place in memory of Major General of Police Vorobyov.
