= Militsiya =

Soviet and Eastern Bloc police force

Militsiya Militsiya Милиция

Agency overview
- Formed: 1917
- Dissolved: 1991
- Superseding agency: Militsiya (Russia); Militsiya (Ukraine); Militsiya (Belarus)

Jurisdictional structure
- National agency: Russian SFSR (1917–1922); Soviet Union (1922–1991)
- Operations jurisdiction: Russian SFSR (1917–1922); Soviet Union (1922–1991)
- General nature: Civilian police

Operational structure
- Headquarters: Moscow
- Parent agency: People's Commissariat for Internal Affairs (1917–1946); Ministry of Internal Affairs (1946–1991)
- Child agencies: Main Directorate for Public Order Maintenance; State Automobile Inspectorate; Main Directorate for Transport; Main Directorate of Criminal Investigation; Department Against Misappropriation of Socialist Property; Special Police Department

The militsiya (Note: Russian: милиция, IPA: [mʲɪˈlʲitsɨjə], Serbo-Croatian: милиција, romanized: milicija, lit. 'militia'.) was the police force of the Russian SFSR and Soviet Union from 1917 to 1991. The term was likewise used for police forces in several Eastern Bloc countries and in the SFR Yugoslavia from 1945 to 1992.

The term militsiya continues to be used in common and sometimes official usage in some of the individual post-Soviet states, such as Belarus, Tajikistan, Uzbekistan and Kyrgyzstan, as well as in the partially recognised or unrecognised republics of Abkhazia, South Ossetia and Transnistria. In Russian law enforcement, the term remained in official usage until the police reform of 2011.

== Name and status ==
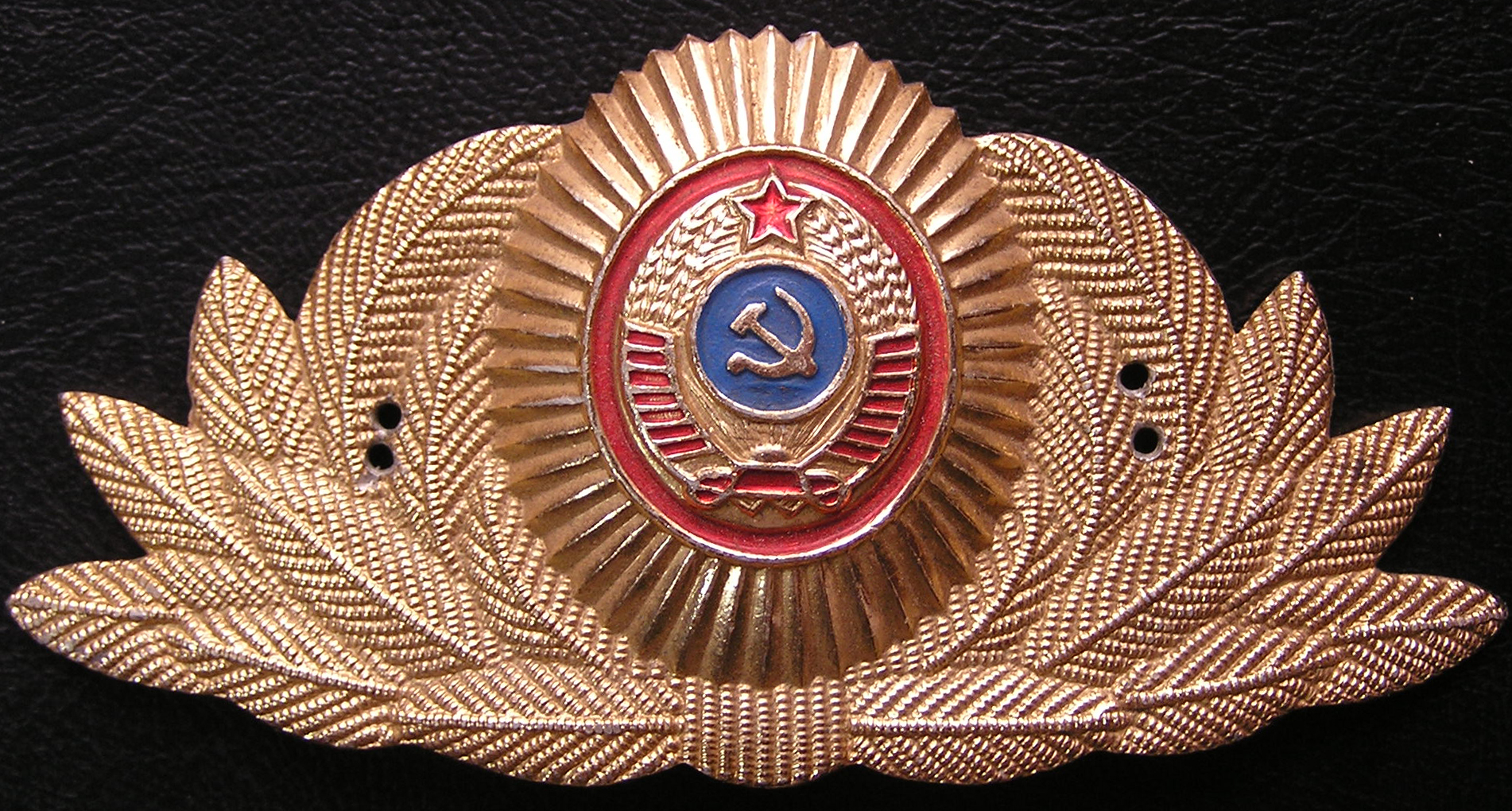
Soviet militsiya officer's cap cockade (service/parade version).

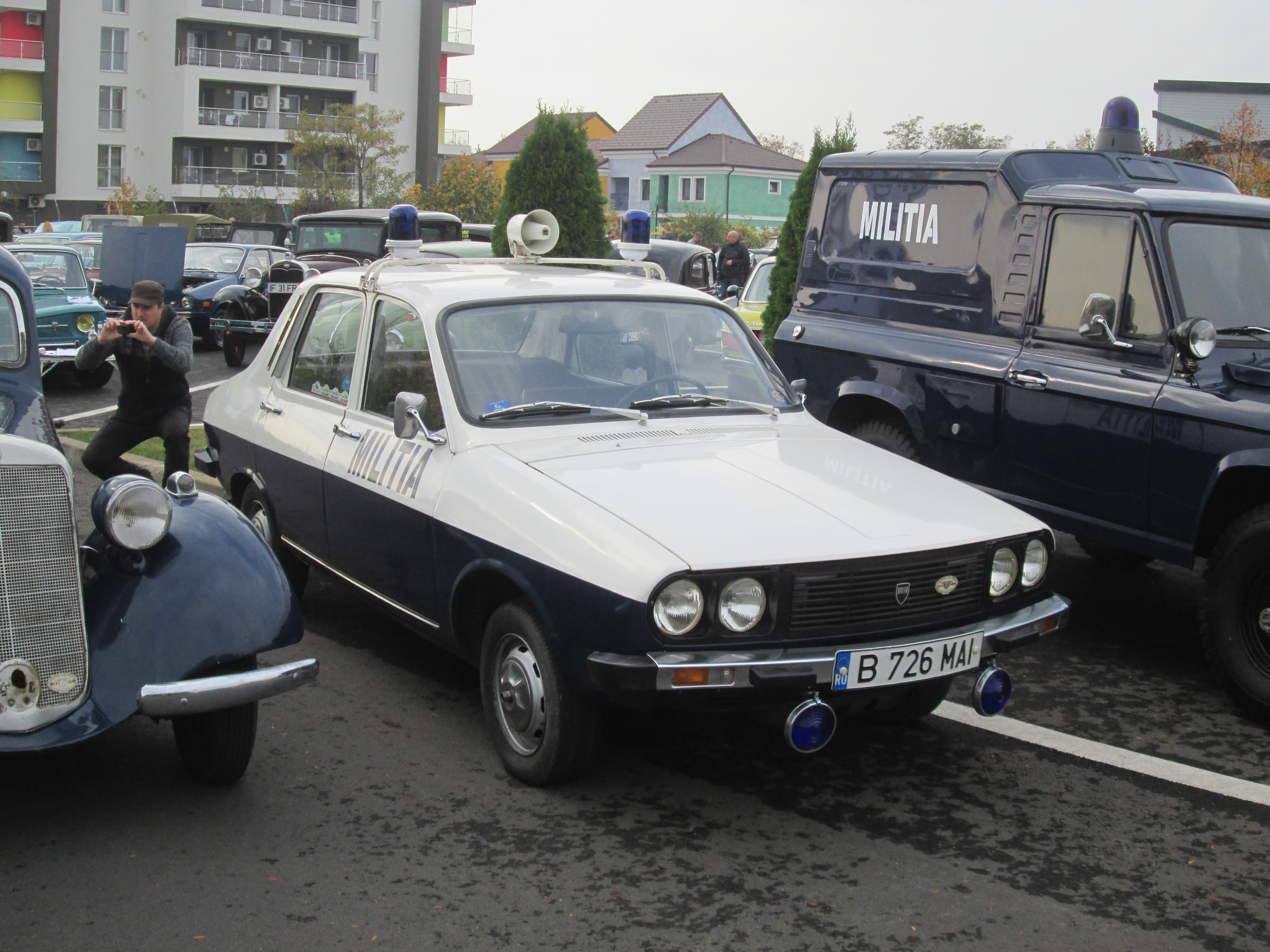
Romanian Miliția car in the typical livery it featured starting with the early 1970s. This particular example is a Dacia 1310 from 1982. This is one of the examples of Eastern European adaptations of this name.

Countries in which the civilian police was once called militsiya Countries in which the civilian police is now called militsiya

The name militsiya as applied to police forces originates from a Russian Provisional Government decree dated April 17, 1917, and from the early Soviet period: both the Provisional Government and the Bolsheviks intended to associate their new law-enforcement authority with the self-organisation of the people and to distinguish it from the tsarist police. The militsiya was reaffirmed in Russia on 10 November [O.S. 28 October] 1917 under the official name of the Workers' and Peasants' Militsiya, in further contrast to what the Bolsheviks called the "bourgeois class protecting" police.

Eventually, it was replaced by the Ministry of Internal Affairs, which is now the official full name for the militsiya in their respective countries. Its regional branches are officially called departments of internal affairs, city departments of internal affairs, raion departments of internal affairs, oblast department of internal affairs, and so on. (Note: The Russian term for a raion department is OVD (ОВД; Отдел/Отделение внутренних дел, Otdel/Otdeleniye vnutrennikh del), for region department is UVD (УВД; Управление внутренних дел, Upravleniye vnutrennikh del) or, sometimes, GUVD (ГУВД; Главное управление внутренних дел, Glavnoye upravleniye vnutrennikh del), same for national republics is MVD (МВД; Министерство внутренних дел, Ministerstvo vnutrennikh del).)

Functionally, the ministries of internal affairs are mostly police agencies. Their functions and organisation differ significantly from similarly named departments in countries of the Western Bloc, which are usually civil executive bodies headed by politicians and responsible for many other tasks as well as the supervision of law enforcement. The Soviet and successor ministries of internal affairs have usually been headed by a militsiya general and predominantly consist of service personnel, with civilian employees only filling auxiliary posts. Although such ministers are members of their respective countries' cabinets, they usually do not report to the prime minister or parliament, but only to the president. Local militsiya departments are subordinated to their regional departments, having little accountability to local authorities.

The official names of particular militsiya bodies and services in post-Soviet countries are usually very complicated, hence the use of the short term militsiya. Laws usually refer to police just as militsiya.

The short term for a police officer (regardless of gender) is militsioner (Russian: милиционер, pl. милиционеры, militsionery). Slang Russian terms for militsioner include ment (plural: менты, menty) and musor (plural: мусора, musora). Although the latter word is offensive (it literally means "trash" or "garbage"), it originated from an acronym for the Moscow Criminal Investigations Department (Russian: МУС, romanized: MUS, short for Russian: Московский уголовный сыск, romanized: Moskovskiy ugolovnyy sysk) in Imperial Russia.

The following countries have changed the name of the police force from militsiya (or equivalent) to a western-style name analogous to "police": Bulgaria, Poland, Romania, Estonia, Lithuania, Moldova, Latvia, Mongolia, North Macedonia, Azerbaijan, Georgia, Serbia, Montenegro, Bosnia and Herzegovina, Croatia, Slovenia, Kazakhstan, Armenia, Turkmenistan, Russia and Ukraine.

In 2019, Uzbekistan officially removed references to the word militsiya from its laws without replacing them with "police".

The police are still called militsiya in Belarus, Tajikistan, Kyrgyzstan, as well as in the unrecognized republics of Abkhazia, South Ossetia and Transnistria.

== General overview ==
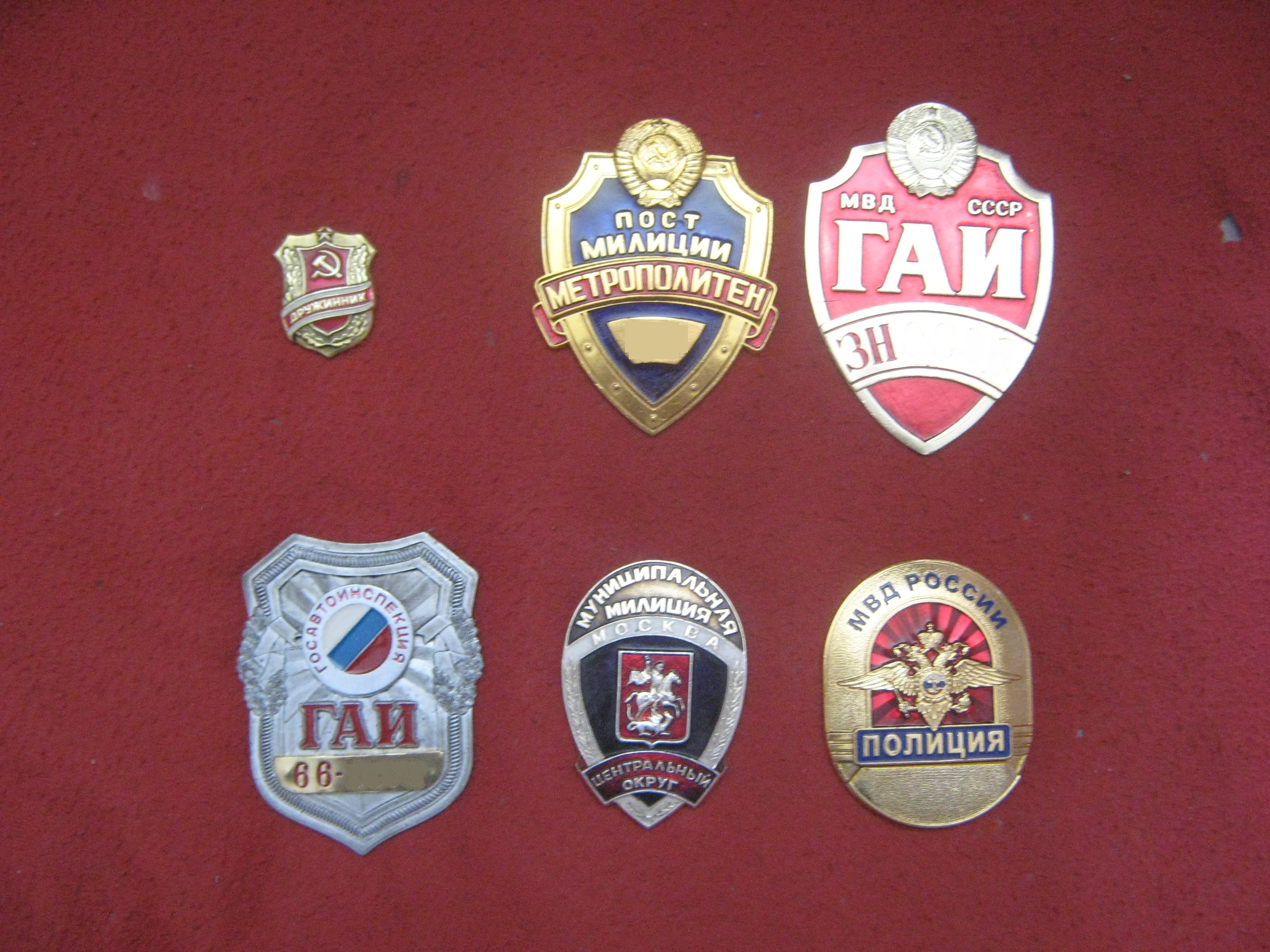
Soviet and Russian badges, from left to right, top to bottom: Soviet Druzhinnik badge, Soviet Metro (Subway) Post Militia (PPS), Soviet State Automobile Inspection (GAI), State Automobile Inspection (GAI) of the Russian Federation, Russian Moscow Municipal Militia, Central District, and Russian Police.

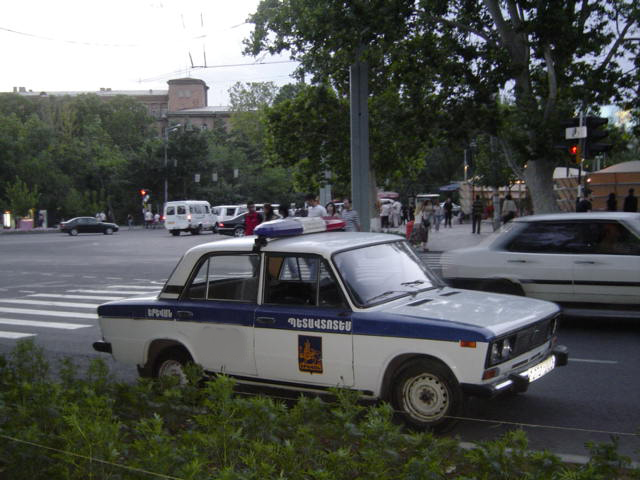
A Lada 2106 belonging to the Armenian State Automobile Inspection parked on a street in Yerevan, June 2007.

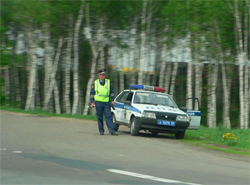
A Russian GAI inspector with a radar gun on the side of MKAD

The organizational structure, methods and traditions of the militsiya differ significantly from those of western police. The militsiya as an organisation consists of many functional departments, such as the GIBDD, a traffic police. Organised crime detectives form highly independent squads inside a regional militsiya. Some units may have the distinctive names (like OMON in Russia) which are more specific than militsiya or militsioner.

Personnel ranks of the militsiya mostly follow those of the army – from private (Russian: ryadovoy), which is the lowest rank, to colonel general – with only these exceptions: there are no ranks of yefreytor, army general, or marshal. Detectives (Russian: оперативник, operativnik, 'operative', short for "operative employee" – оперативный работник, operativniy rabotnik) hold a rank of at least lieutenant, and could be promoted to major or colonel. The militsiya of an oblast (or other equivalent subnational entity) is usually headed by a general. The rank name is suffixed with "of the militsiya" (e.g. "major of the militsiya" for a major). Personnel of the militsiya carry firearms, but are not permitted to carry their weapons when they are off duty.

Under the Patrol Police Service Regulations, a designated police officer-driver is required to have a driver licence and is not allowed to abandon the vehicle. However, this refers only to fully marked police vehicles with emergency lights; detectives are allowed to drive civilian cars with are registered to the MVD, having white number plates (marked police vehicles have blue plates) with specific series (for example, o...vo, o...rr, o...mm, o...om). The last two are usually assigned to the vehicles registered to regional level MVD units. The law does not provide any preferences on the road nor allows emergency lights and/or sirens on such vehicles, therefore technically police officers do not have the right to violate traffic laws even while on an assignment. The GIBDD (traffic militsiya) is the only exception: its members drive their own (or even own private) cars and are specially trained in risk-driving.

One unique feature of militsiya policing approach is the system of territorial patronage over citizens. The cities, as well as the rural settlements are divided into quarters, or uchastki (sing. участок, uchastok), with a special uchastkovy militsioner ('quarter policeman'), assigned to each. The main duty of a uchastkovy (участковый, pl. участковые, uchastkovye) is to maintain close relations with the residents of his quarter and gather information among them. In particular, the uchastkovy should personally know each and every ex-convict, substance abuser, young hooligan, and so on, in a given uchastok, and visit them regularly for preemptive influence. The uchastkovy is also responsible for tackling minor offences like family violence, loud noise, residential area parking, and so on. The uchastkovy is also the main, and actually the real, militsiya force in remote areas and small settlements where permanent police departments are not created. An uchastkovy militsioner has a separate small office within their quarter and maintain citizens' admittance in definite weekdays.

This system slightly resembles the US system of sheriffs but shows some notable differences. The uchastkovy is neither a chief police officer in a given community nor a universal one (not combining detective, incarceration or special tactics tasks).

The system of the uchastkovy dates back to the Russian Empire, when uriadniki were conducting lowest-level policing in rural areas. In the Soviet Union, the uchastkovye were also responsible for such tasks as maintaining propiska limitations and overseeing former political prisoners, which were subject to daily registration at the local MVD office.

Although women constitute a significant proportion of militsiya staff, they are usually not permitted to fill positions that carry risks (such as patrolman, guard, SWAT), but are allowed to carry firearms for self-defence. Instead, they are widely represented among investigators, juvenile crime inspectors, clerks, and so on. However, limited attempts are being made to appoint women as traffic officers, or operativniki.

=== Conscripted police ===
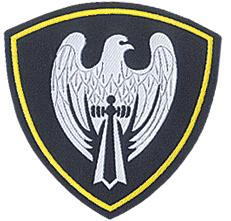
Shoulder patch of Internal Troops, Moscow District

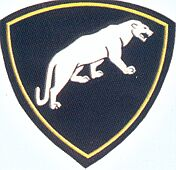
ODON shoulder patch

Another unique militsiya feature is the use of conscripted soldiers from the Internal Troops and special motorized militsiya units (СМЧМ, SMChM) for regular urban policing and for securing various mass events, which required more force employment than usual. The Internal Troops and SMChM units are the gendarmerie-like military force who can be assigned to carry out simple public security tasks like patrolling while being accompanied by professional militsionery, or cordoning large crowds at sport events, concerts, and protests. These soldiers possess no firearms on their policing duties, however they are equipped with PR-73 rubber police batons, PR-90 tonfas and related equipment; when called to perform riot control duties, they are typically equipped with ballistic shields and tear gas. The SMChM soldiers typically wear grey militsiya uniforms, distinguished from commissioned officers by wearing standard-issued sapogi instead of individual boots or shoes, the Internal Troops wear green military uniform. During emergencies, raids, dragnets and other police operations, they are equipped with bullet-proof vests and protective gear, firearms and armoured vehicles while performing their policing duties.

While not on law enforcement duty, soldiers reside in barracks and maintain standard military training. Special motorised militsiya units stationed in the cities were all battalions with three exceptions. Kiev and Leningrad had regiments and Moscow had a division, known as ODON, which is frequently used for policing Moscow; its soldiers can be spotted by a shoulder patch which features a white panther; other Internal troops units in the Moscow region use a shoulder patch with a white falcon.

=== Rank insignia ===
Until late 1936, the militsiya and Internal Troops of the NKVD had no personal ranks, much akin to the Red Army, Red Navy, and OGPU, and used position ranks. When personal ranks were reintroduced in the military in 1935, the militsiya created a curious rank system that was a blend of standard military ranks such as sergeant, lieutenant, captain and major, and old positional ranks like 'squad leader', 'inspector', and 'director', some with several grades like 'senior' or 'junior'. The collar rank insignia was completely original and not based on military insignia.

This system was largely reused by the GUGB in their special rank structure introduced in 1935, although with new rank insignia and commissar-style ranks for top officers.

New insignia were issued to GUGB in 1937 and to the militsiya in 1939. It was now based on collar rank patches of the Red Army and Internal Troops. Confusingly, the special NKVD rank system was left intact, so for example Captain of Militsiya/State Security was assigned the three-box insignia of an army Colonel (in the Red Army, this patch was reassigned to lieutenant colonel in September 1939, but the NKVD did not alter their insignia) and Major of Militsiya/State Security was mapped to one-romb insignia of kombrig (brigade commander) (which was abolished for commanding officers of the Red Army in May 1940). This created a great deal of inconsistency and tension between army and NKVD/NKGB officers.

The NKVD rank system was streamlined in 1943 when imperial-style shoulder boards replaced the collar insignia patches. The ranks now copied those of the Soviet Army, with the exception of top officers starting with senior major who were renamed commissars of themilitsiya, 3rd, 2nd, and 1st rank, although they still wore army-style major general, lieutenant general and colonel general shoulder boards.

The GUGB/NKGB maintained their commissar ranks until 1945, and switched to equivalent General ranks after that. The militsiya retained the commissar ranks until 1973.

Some MVD officers had distinct ranks of general of the Internal Service, 1st, 2nd and 3rd rank; they were replaced with major general, lieutenant general and colonel general in the 1970s.

The ranks of the militsiya are considered special ranks, not to be confused with military (all-forces) ranks, which are used by the internal troops of the MVD. All militsiya ranks have had the words "of the militsiya" at the end, which are part of the rank name and not a descriptive addition.

==== Soviet militsiya (1936–1939) ====
| | Chief Director of Militsiya | Director of Militsiya | Inspector of Militsiya | Senior Major | Major | Captain | Senior Lieutenant |
|---|---|---|---|---|---|---|---|

| | Lieutenant | Junior Lieutenant | Sergeant | Cadet | Starshina | Subunit Leader | Senior Militiaman | Militiaman |
|---|---|---|---|---|---|---|---|---|

==== Soviet militsiya (1939–1943) ====
| | Chief Director | Director | Inspector | Senior Major | Major | Captain | Senior Lieutenant | Lieutenant |
|---|---|---|---|---|---|---|---|---|

| | Junior Lieutenant | Sergeant | Starshina | Subunit Leader | Senior Militiaman | Militiaman |
|---|---|---|---|---|---|---|

==== Former Russian militsiya ====
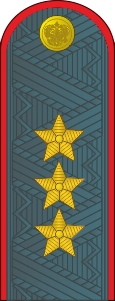
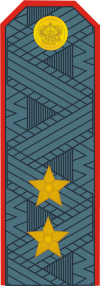
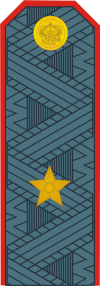
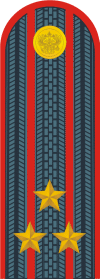
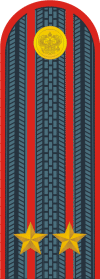
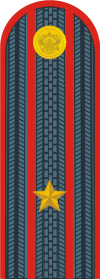
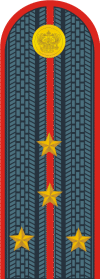
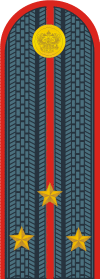
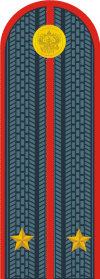
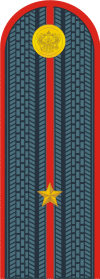
| | Supreme Supervising Staff | | | Senior Supervising Staff | | | Medium Supervising Staff |
|---|---|---|---|---|---|---|---|---|---|---|
| Shoulder insignia for every day uniform |
| Rank | Colonel General of militsiya | Lieutenant General of militsiya | Major General of militsiya | Colonel of militsiya | Lieutenant colonel of militsiya | Major of militsiya | Captain of militsiya | Senior lieutenant of militsiya | Lieutenant of militsiya | Junior lieutenant of militsiya |

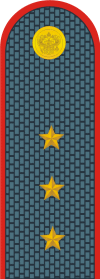
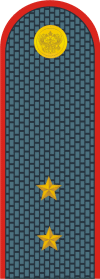
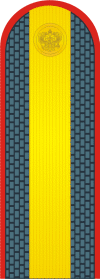
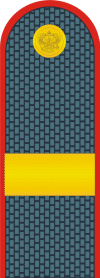
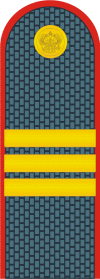
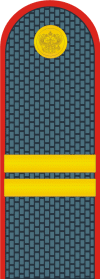
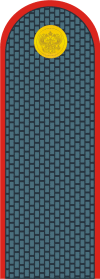
| | Junior Supervising Staff | | | | | | Private Staff |
|---|---|---|---|---|---|---|---|
| Shoulder insignia for every day uniform |
| Rank | Senior praporshchik of militsiya | Praporshchik of militsiya | Starshina of militsiya | Senior sergeant of militsiya | Sergeant of militsiya | Junior sergeant of militsiya | Private of militsiya |

==== Former Ukrainian militsiya ====
| | General Officers | | | Senior Commissioned Officers | | | Junior Commissioned Officers |
|---|---|---|---|---|---|---|---|---|---|---|
| Shoulder insignia for every day uniform |
| Rank | Colonel General of militsiya | Lieutenant General of militsiya | Major General of militsiya | Colonel of militsiya | Lieutenant colonel of militsiya | Major of militsiya | Captain of militsiya | Senior lieutenant of militsiya | Lieutenant of militsiya | Junior lieutenant of militsiya |

| | Private Officers | Cadet Officers | Non-commissioned Officers |
|---|---|---|---|---|---|---|---|---|
| Shoulder insignia for every day uniform |
| Rank | Senior praporshchik of militsiya | Praporshchik of militsiya | Starshina of militsiya | Senior sergeant of militsiya | Sergeant of militsiya | Junior sergeant of militsiya | Private of militsiya | Cadet of militsiya |

==== Belarusian militsiya ====
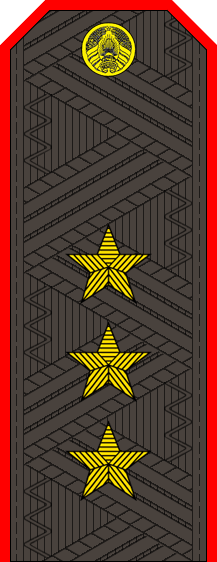
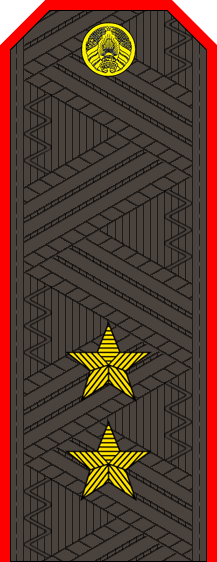
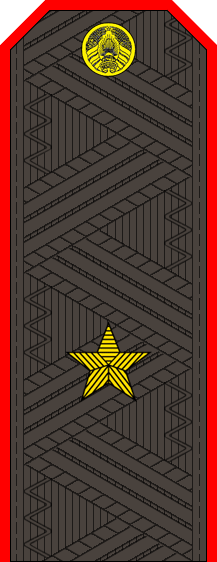
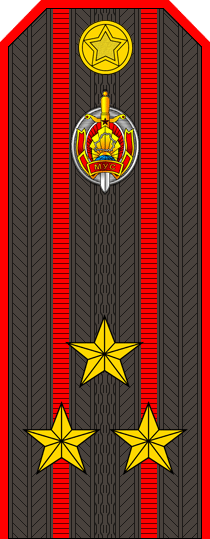
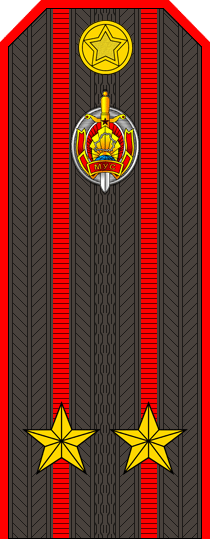
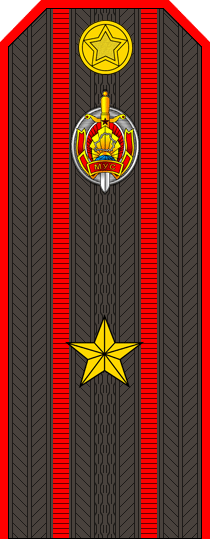
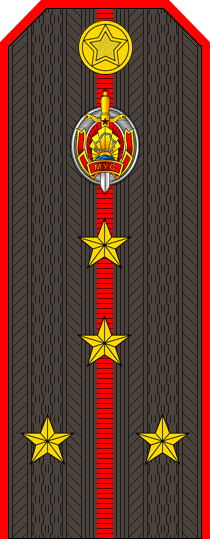
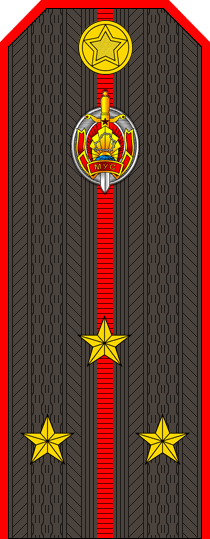
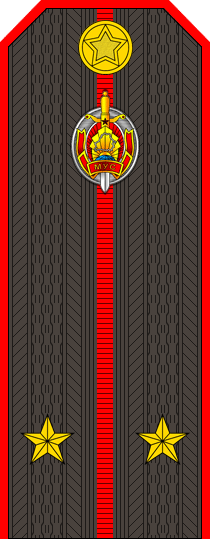
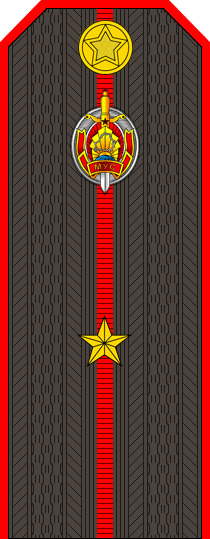
| Category | General Personnel | | | Senior Officers | | | Junior Officers |
|---|---|---|---|---|---|---|---|---|---|---|
| Shoulder Ranks |
| Ranks | Colonel General | Lieutenant General | Major General | Colonel | Lieutenant Colonel | Major | Captain | Senior; Lieutenant | Lieutenant | Junior; Lieutenant |

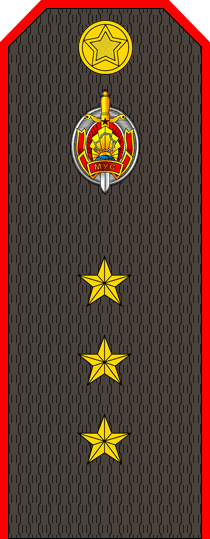
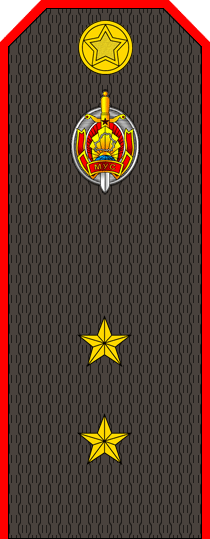
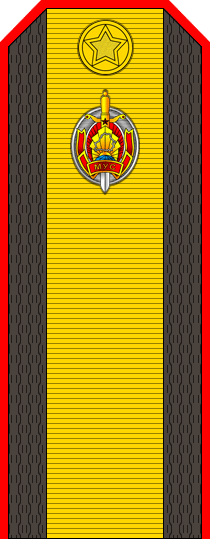
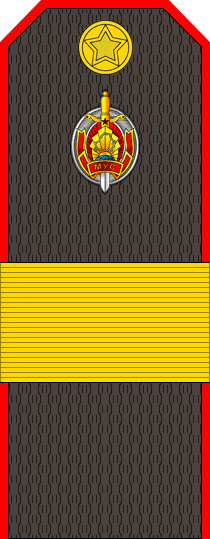
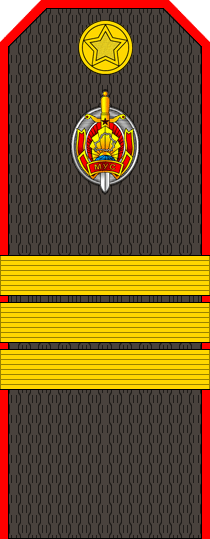
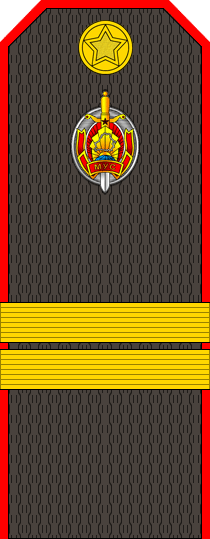
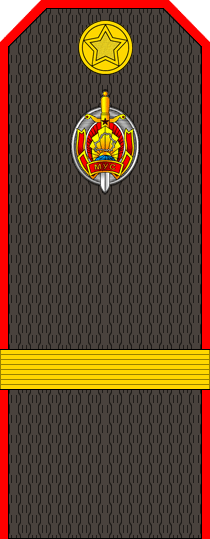
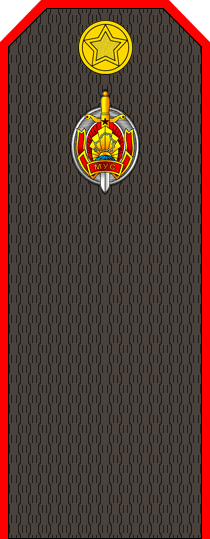
| Category | Ensigns | | Sergeants | | | | Private |
|---|---|---|---|---|---|---|---|---|
| Police Shoulder |
| Rank | Senior Ensign | Ensign | Starshina | Senior; Sergeant | Sergeant | Junior; Sergeant | Gefreiter | Private |

== Non-police services ==
The Soviet and some post-Soviet Ministries of Internal Affairs have also included:

- Militarized forces (Internal Troops);
- Department of prisons (i.e. Gulag and its successor bodies), if not merged with other ministries or agencies;
- Passport and registration service, if not merged with the migration service.

These non-police services should be distinguished from the militsiya itself, except passport and registration service, which structures are often included into OVD and sometimes considered one of the important militsiya services. Their members have always used different generic names and specific ranks (e.g. major of the Internal Service, rather than major of the militsiya).

== Soviet militsiya (GAI) cars ==
The most common types were:

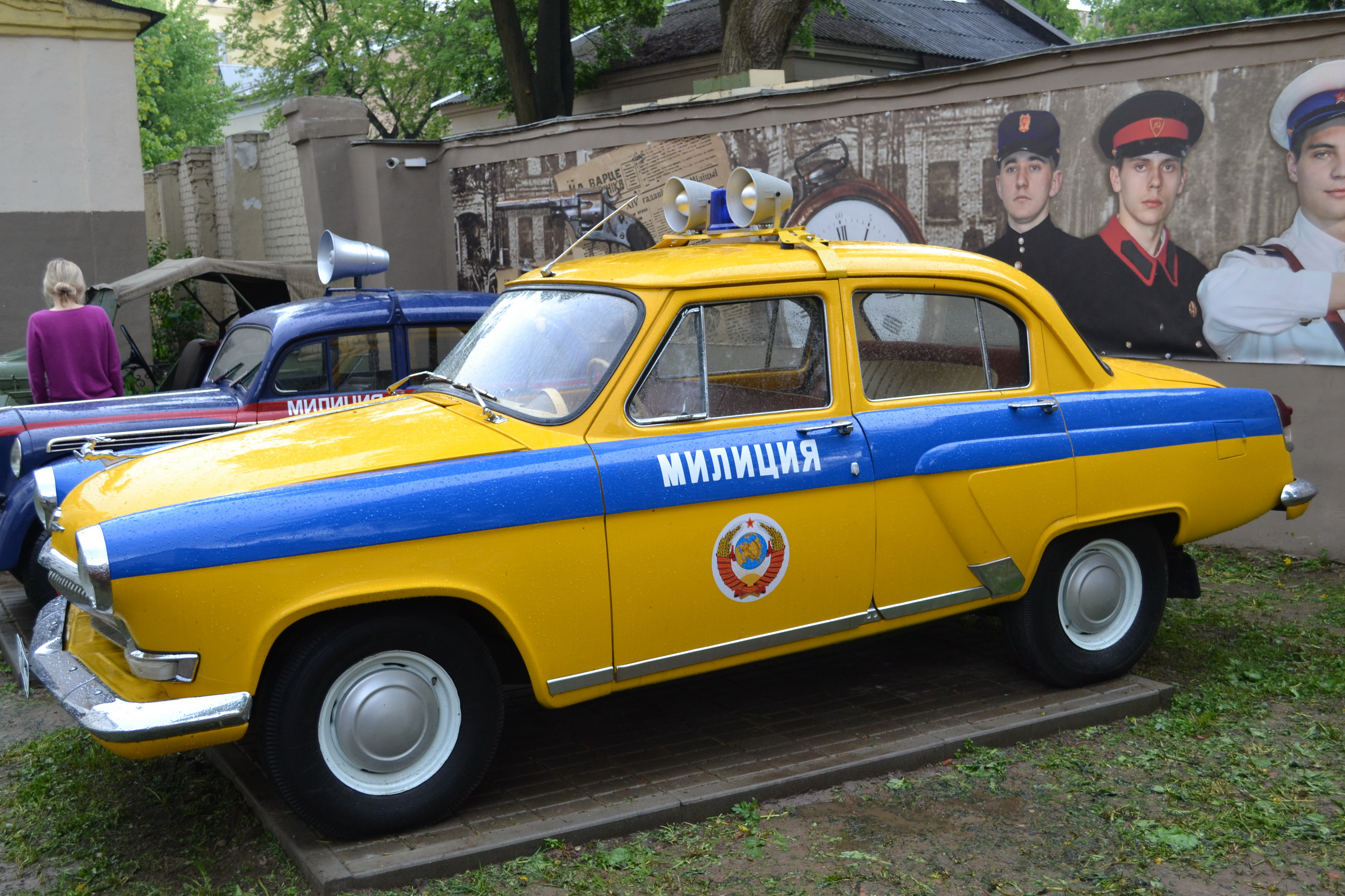
Restored GAZ-21 Volga militsiya car in Minsk 2014

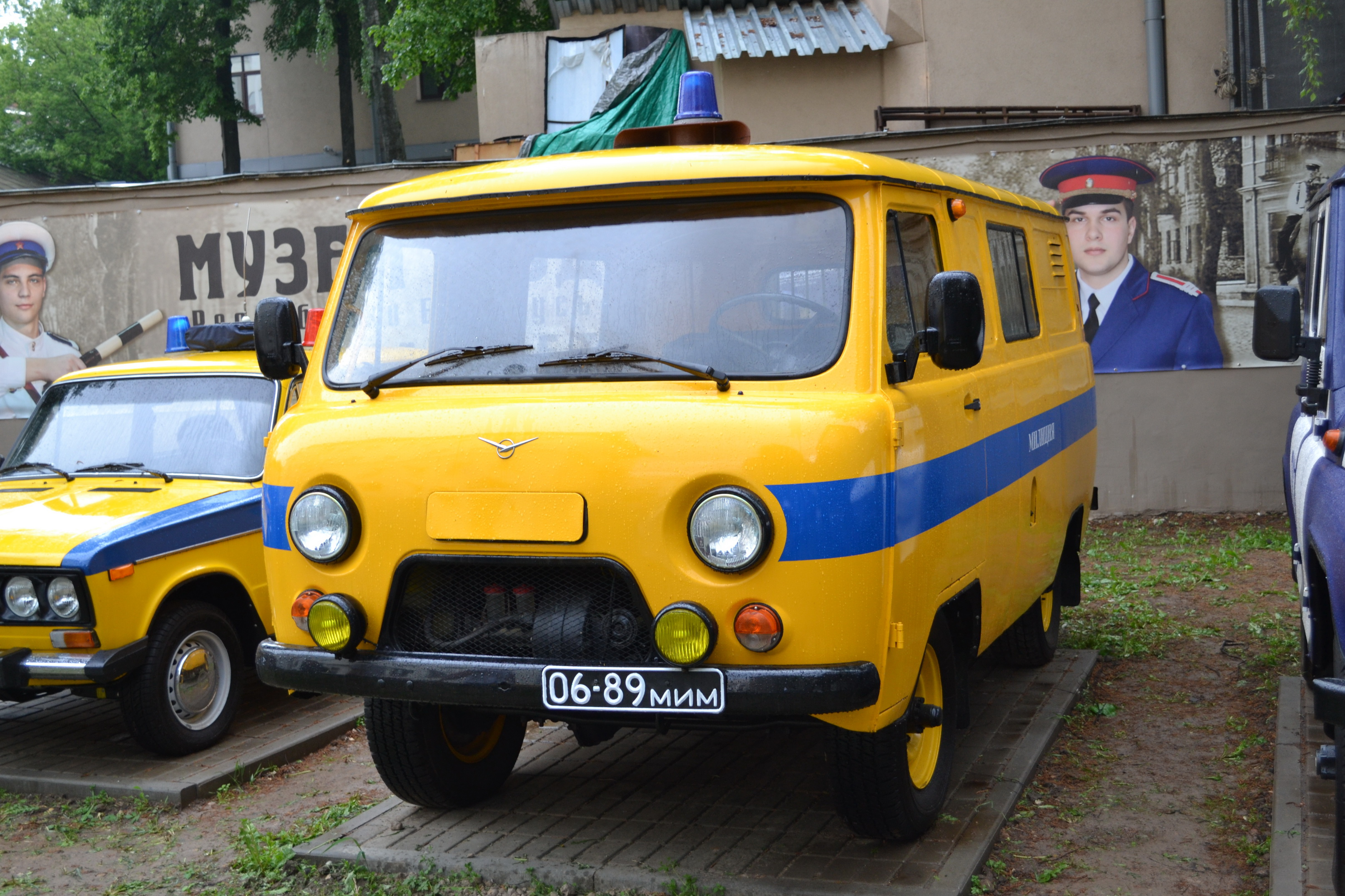
Restored UAZ-452 militsiya van in Minsk 2014

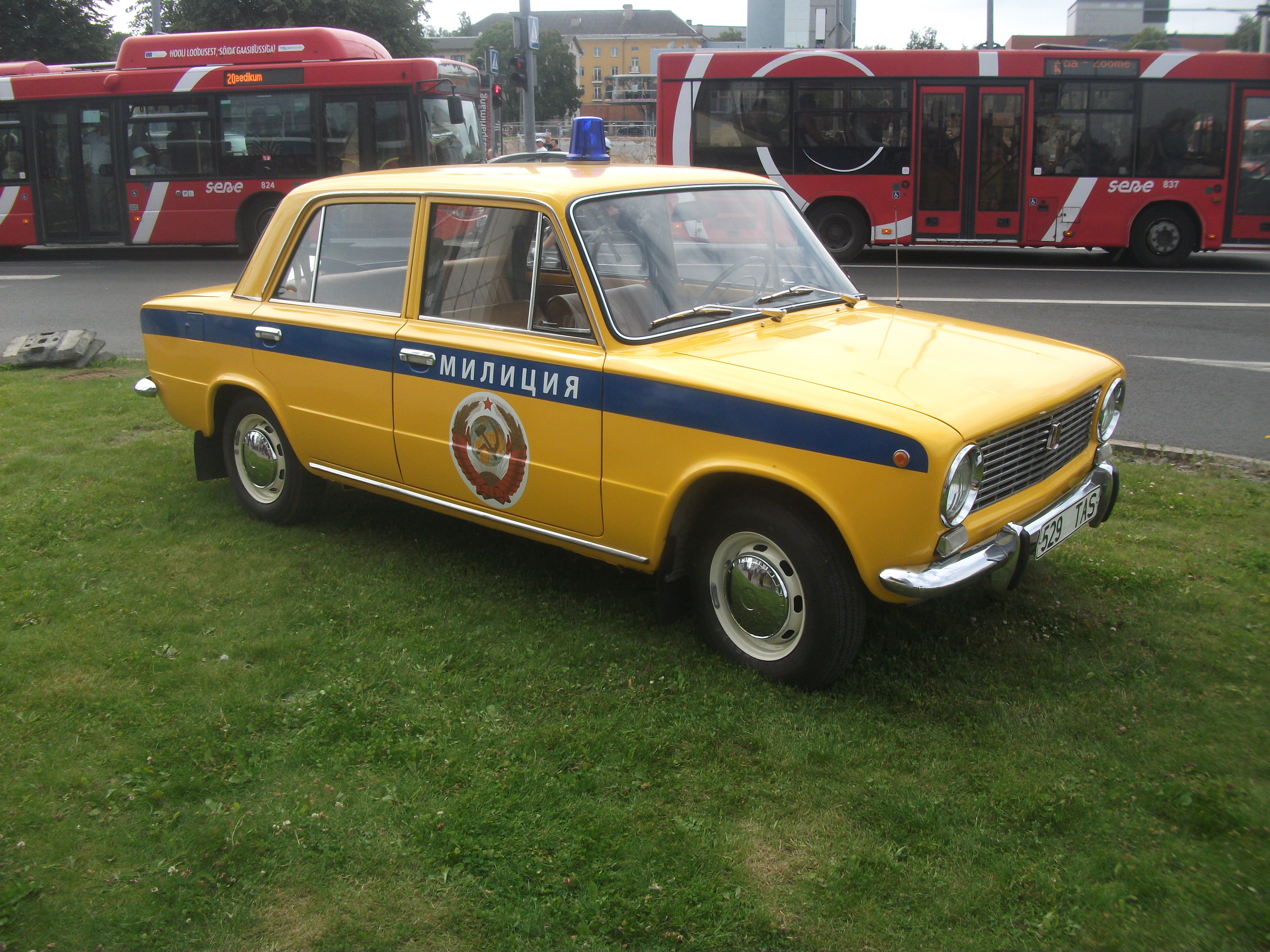
Restored VAZ-2101 Zhiguli militsiya car in Tartu 2014

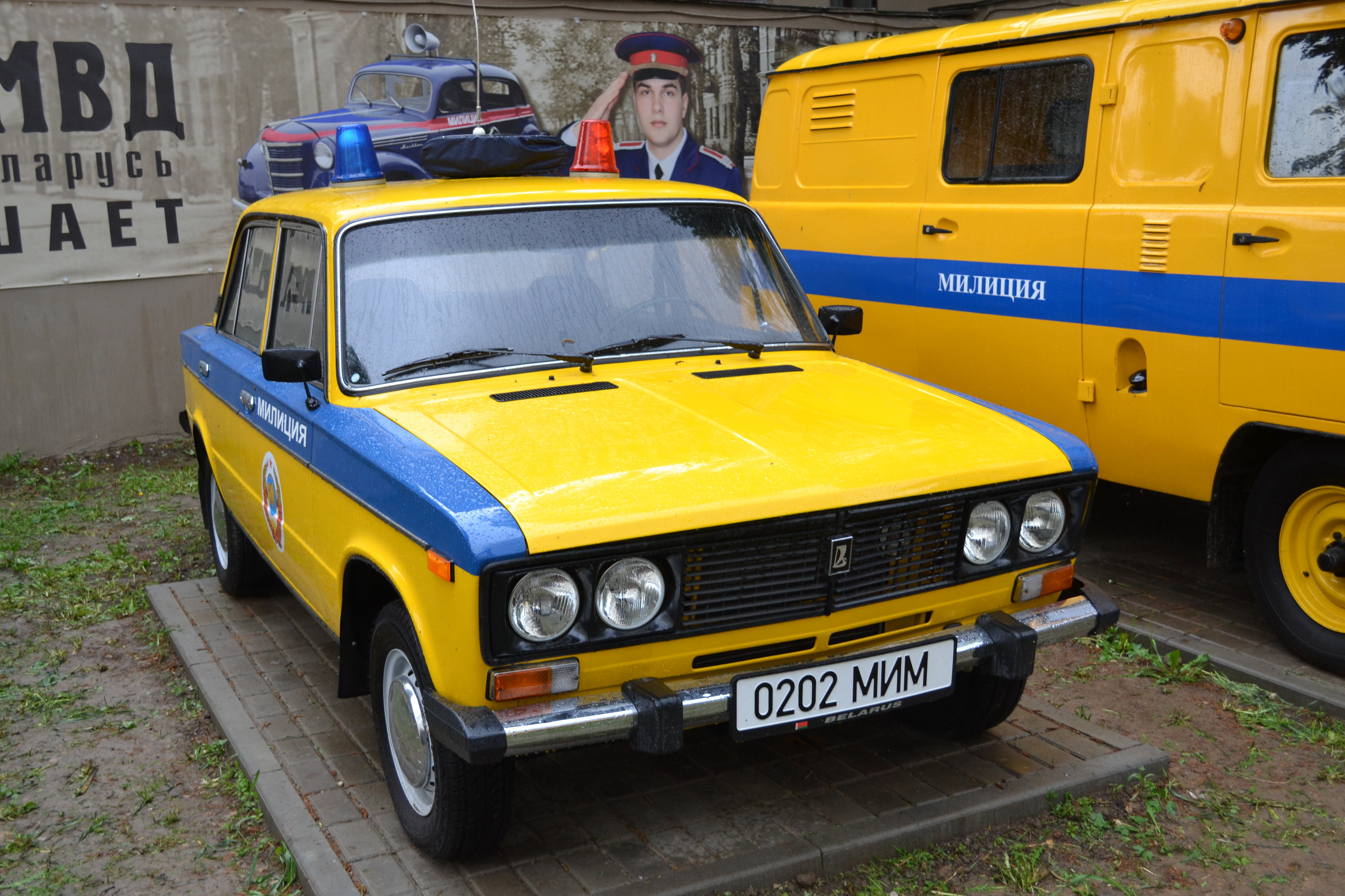
Restored VAZ-2106 in Minsk 2014

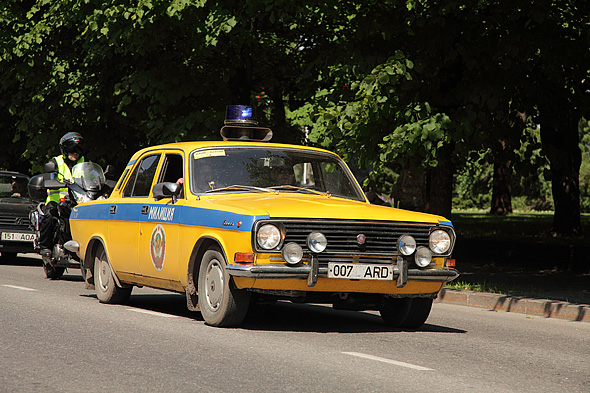
GAZ-24 Volga

== Heads of the militsiya ==
- Georgy Sidamon-Eristov (March 11, 1917 – June 15, 1917)
- Andrey Dizhbit (August 1, 1918 – 1919)
- Mikhail Vasilyev-Yuzhin (1919–1920)
- Vasily Kornev (1920–1921)
- Tikhon Khvesin (1921–1922)
- Pyotr Sergievsky (1923–1927)
- Ivan Kiselev (1928–1931)
- Ivan Kashirin (1931)
- Dmitry Usov (1932)
- Georgy Prokofiev (December 27, 1932 – January 4, 1934)
- Lev Belsky (January 4, 1934 – August 7, 1937)
- Vasily Chernyshev (August 7, 1937 – February 18, 1939)
- Ivan Serov (February 18, 1939 – July 29, 1939)
- Pavel Zuev (July 29, 1939 – March 14, 1940)
- Alexander Galkin (March 14, 1940 – March 10, 1947)
- Alexander Leontiev (March 10, 1947 – March 11, 1953)
- Nikolai Stakhanov (March 11, 1953 – February 22, 1955)
- Taras Filippov (March 11, 1955 – April 4, 1956)
- Mikhail Barsukov (April 4, 1956 – August 10, 1959)
- Grigory Kalinin (August 10, 1959 – January 25, 1960)
- Alexey Kudryavtsev (1962–1967)

== Post-Soviet militsiya forces ==
=== Russia ===
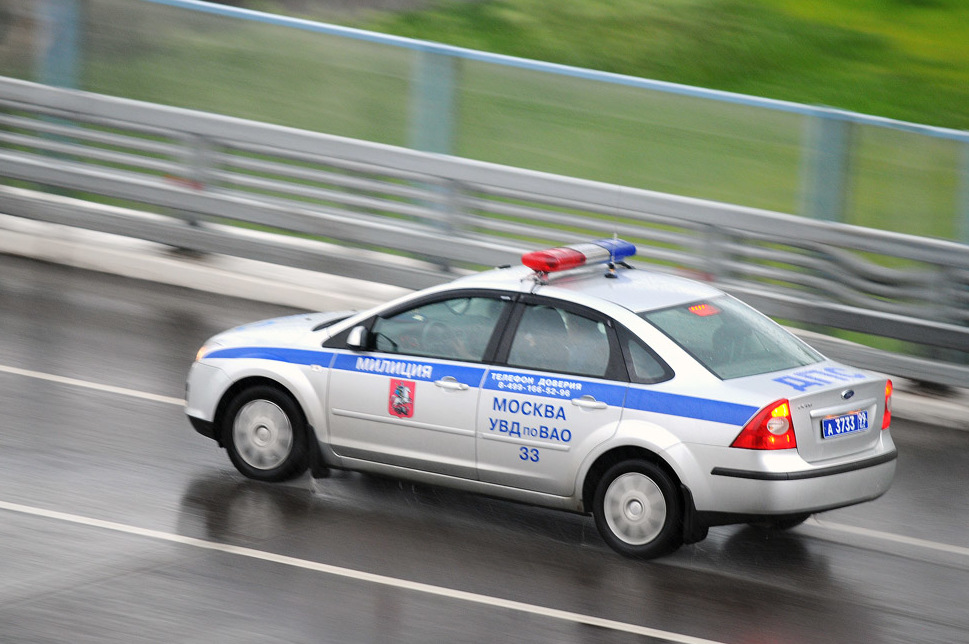
Moscow militsiya Ford Focus.

The Russian Ministry of Internal Affairs, originally established in 1802, was recreated as the Ministry of Internal Affairs of the Russian SFSR in 1990, following the restoration of the republican Council of Ministers and Supreme Soviet, and it remained in place in post-Soviet Russia. There were multiple initiatives aimed the restructuring the ministry throughout the 1990s and 2000s, with responsibility for corrections, prisons and jails being transferred to the Ministry of Justice and firefighting to the Ministry of Emergency Situations. The Ministry of Internal Affairs controlled the militsiya, the State Road Inspection Service (GAI), and the Internal Troops. Since the disbanding of the Tax Police, it also investigates economic crimes.

The Russian militsiya operated on the Law of the Militsiya adopted on 18 April 1991. Its rights and responsibilities were changed significantly when the Criminal Procedure Code came into force in July 2002.

In August 2010, President Dmitry Medvedev introduced new legislation to reform and centralize the funding of the militsiya, as well as to officially change its name to "police" (the term which was used in the Russian Empire). The change was performed on March 1, 2011.

=== Ukraine ===
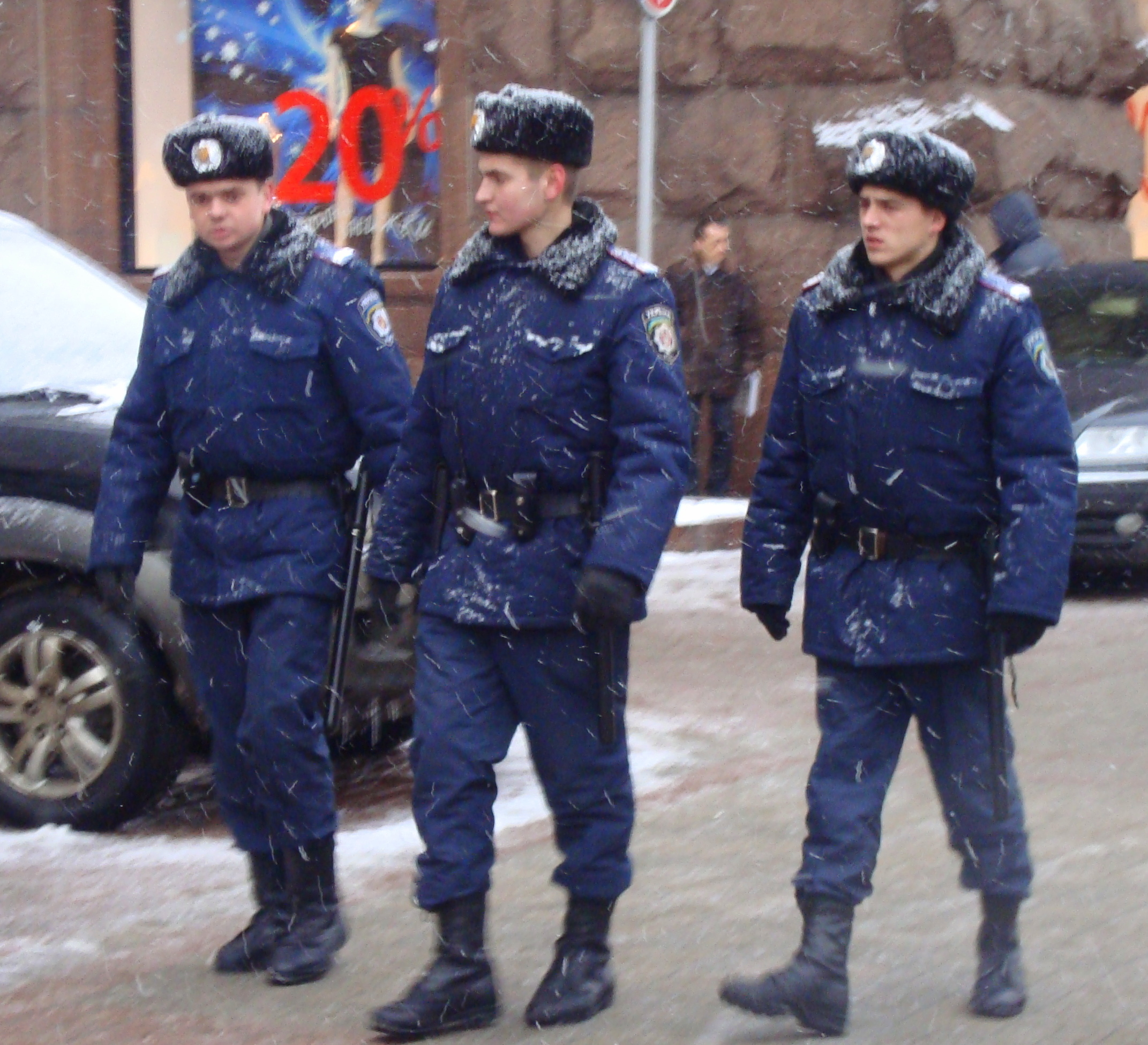
Officers from the Militsiya's public order department patrol Khreshchatyk Street in central Kyiv.

The militsiya was the national police service of Ukraine from the 1950s until 2015. The militsiya was formed in the Ukrainian Soviet Socialist Republic within the Soviet Union, and continued to serve as a national police service in post-Soviet Ukraine until it was replaced by the National Police of Ukraine on 7 November 2015. (Note: On 3 July 2015 the National Police of Ukraine had started to replace militsiya.)

=== Serbia ===
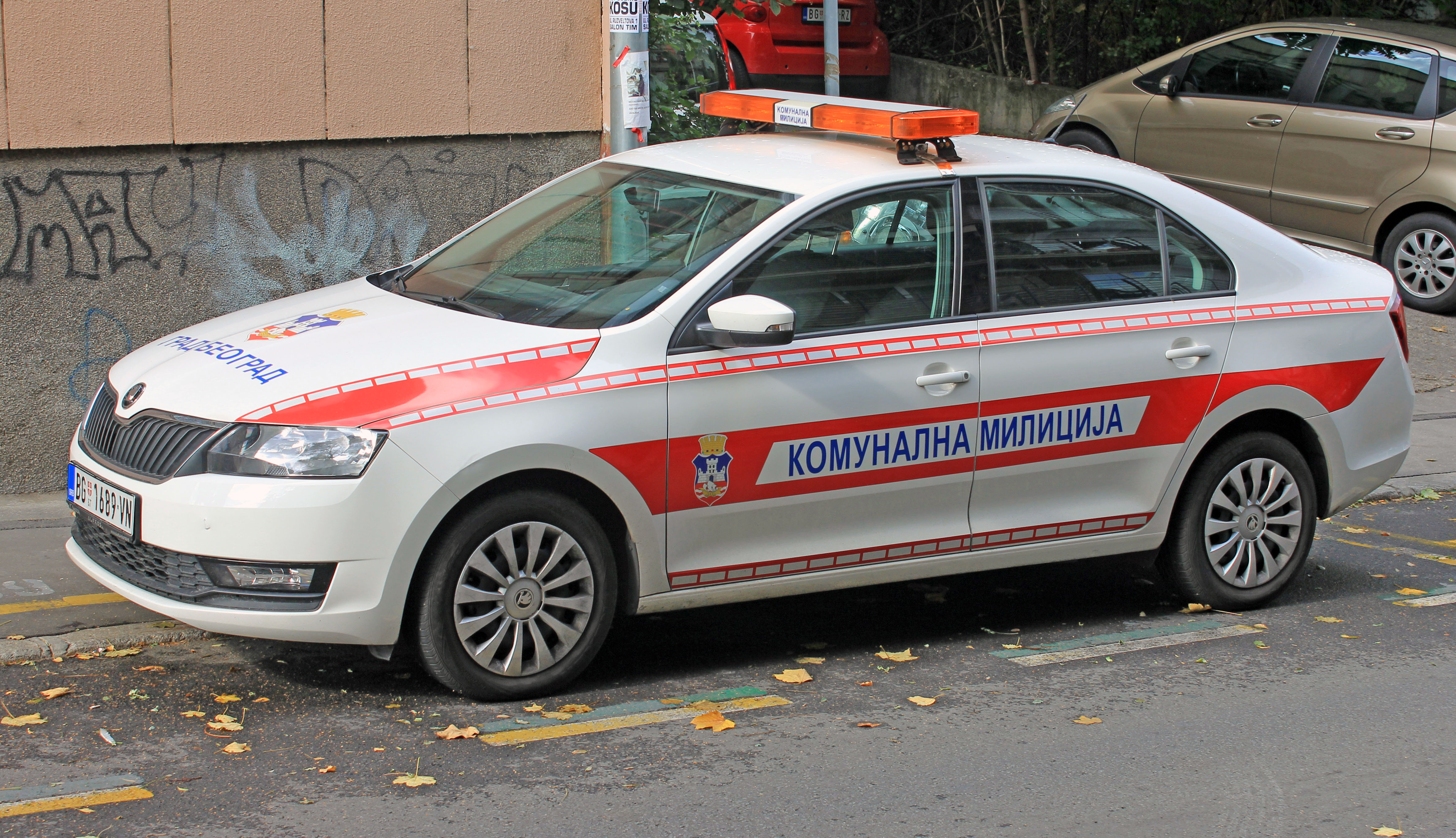
Serbian Škoda Rapid of the Communal Police

In Serbia, the Communal Police (or Municipal Police; Serbian: Комунална полиција, romanized: Komunalna policija) was established in 2009.

In 2016, its name was changed to Communal Militsya (Комунална милиција, Komunalna milicija), under which it continues to operate to the current day.

=== Other jurisdictions ===
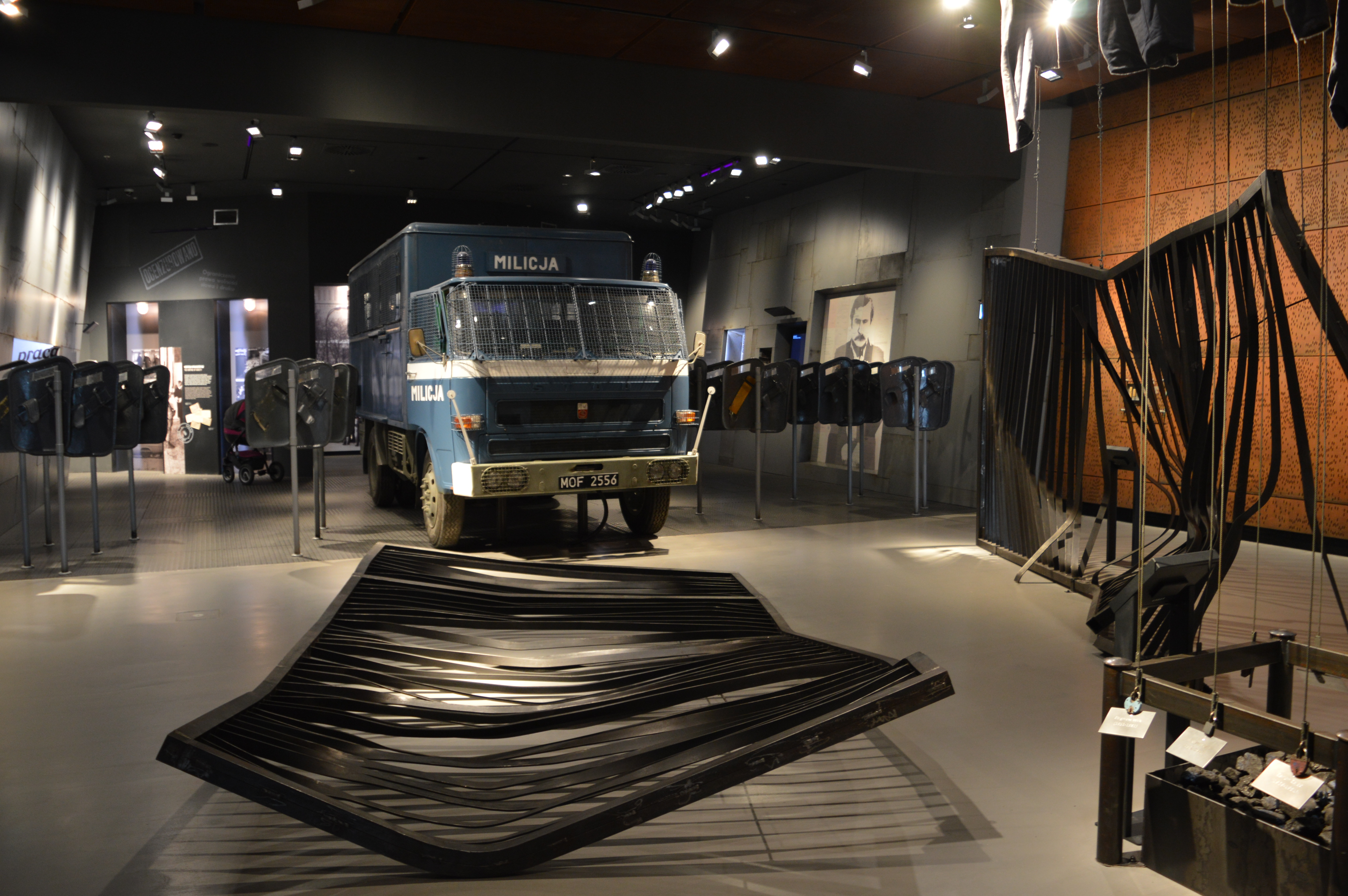
A Polish "Milicja" FSC Star vehicle from the early 1980s and a broken Gdańsk Shipyard gate fragment on display at the European Solidarity Centre in Gdańsk.

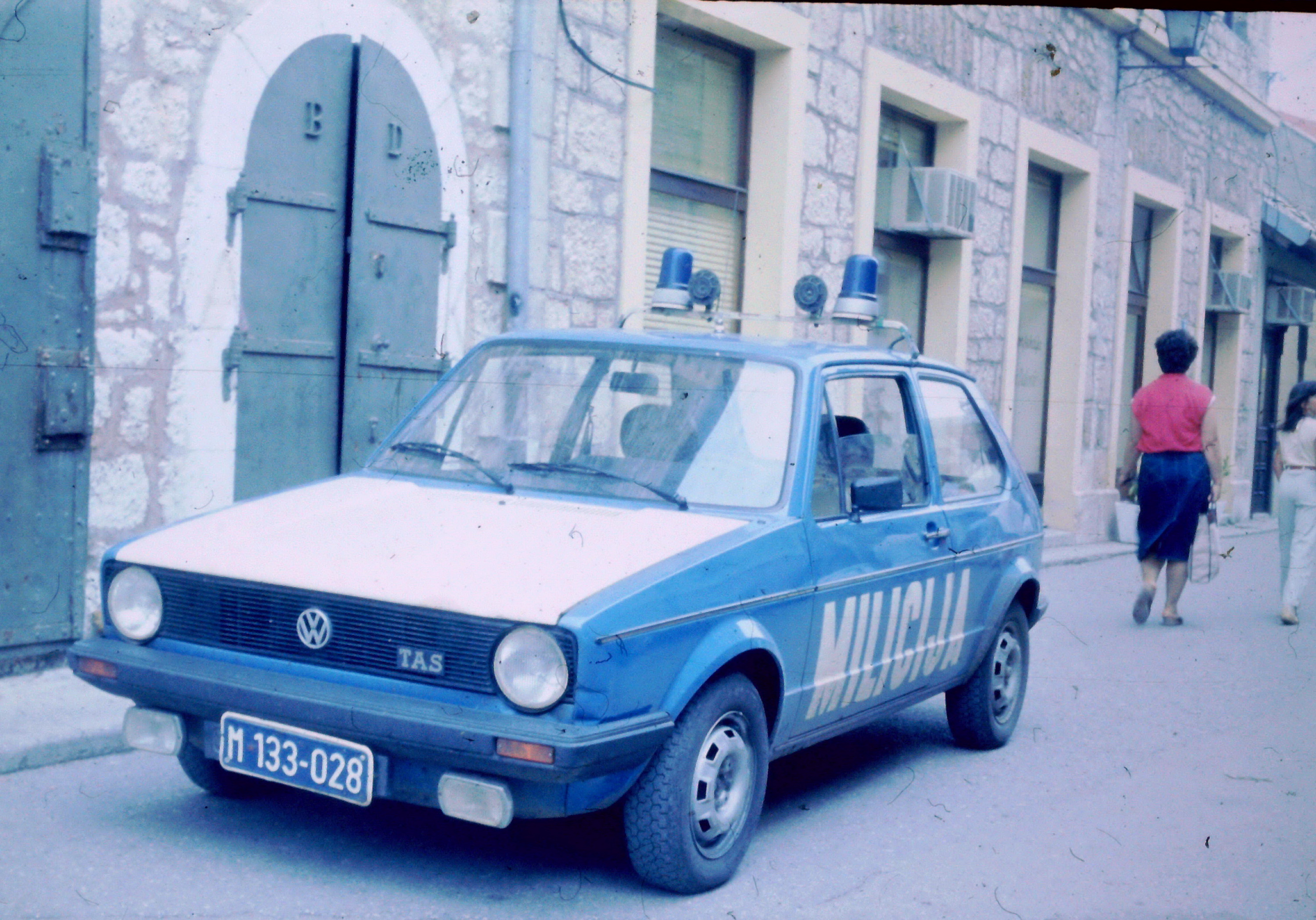
A Yugoslav "Milicija" VW Golf I parked on a street in Mostar, Bosnia and Herzegovina, 1985.

The term militsiya remains in use in the following post-Soviet states:

- The Ministry of Internal Affairs of Belarus operates a militsyya (Belarusian: мiлíцыя), as well as other law-enforcement agencies such as the Presidential Security Service and the State Security Committee (KGB).
- Tajikistan retains the name militsiya, sometime translated as "police".
- The Transnistrian police force bears the official name PMR militsiya.

Cognate terms also came into use in several Soviet bloc countries during the Cold War. Examples included Bulgaria (Peoples' Militia), Poland (Milicja Obywatelska) and other Warsaw Pact nations, as well as the non-aligned SFR Yugoslavia (Milicija), which was phased out throughout the 1990s and replaced by policija (police) in early 1997. Bulgaria changed the name of its law-enforcement body to Policija (Bulgarian: полиция) in 1991. Romania operated a Miliția, but after the communist regime there fell (1989), the Poliția replaced it in 1990.

== See also ==
- ODON of the Internal Troops, USSR and Russia
- OMON, USSR and Russia
- Miliția (Romania)
- Ukrainian People's Militsiya
- Voluntary People's Druzhina

== Sources ==
- Sullivan, Larry E. (2005). Encyclopedia of Law Enforcement. SAGE. ISBN 978-0-7619-2649-8.
