= Armavir =

Armavir may refer to:

== Places ==
- Armavir, Armenia, formerly Sardarapat and Hoktemberyan
  - Armavir Province, an administrative division in western Armenia, with Armavir as provincial capital
  - Armavir (ancient city), capital of ancient Armenia during the Orontid dynasty
  - Armavir (village), 1 km from ancient Armavir
  - Diocese of Armavir, administrative division of the Armenian Apostolic Church
- Armavir, Russia, city and administrative division of Armavir Urban Okrug; named after Armenian city
  - Armavir (air base), a military airfield
  - Armavir Radar Station, a missile attack early warning station

== Other uses ==
- Armavir (film), a 1991 Soviet drama film
- FC Armavir (Russia), a Russian football club
- FC Armavir (Armenia), a defunct Armenian football club
- SS Kolno, earlier named Armavir, a 1940s Soviet cargo ship

== See also ==
- Nor Armavir, a village in the Armavir Province of Armenia
