= Chekalin =

Town in Tula Oblast, Russia

Chekalin Чекалин Čekalin
- Town
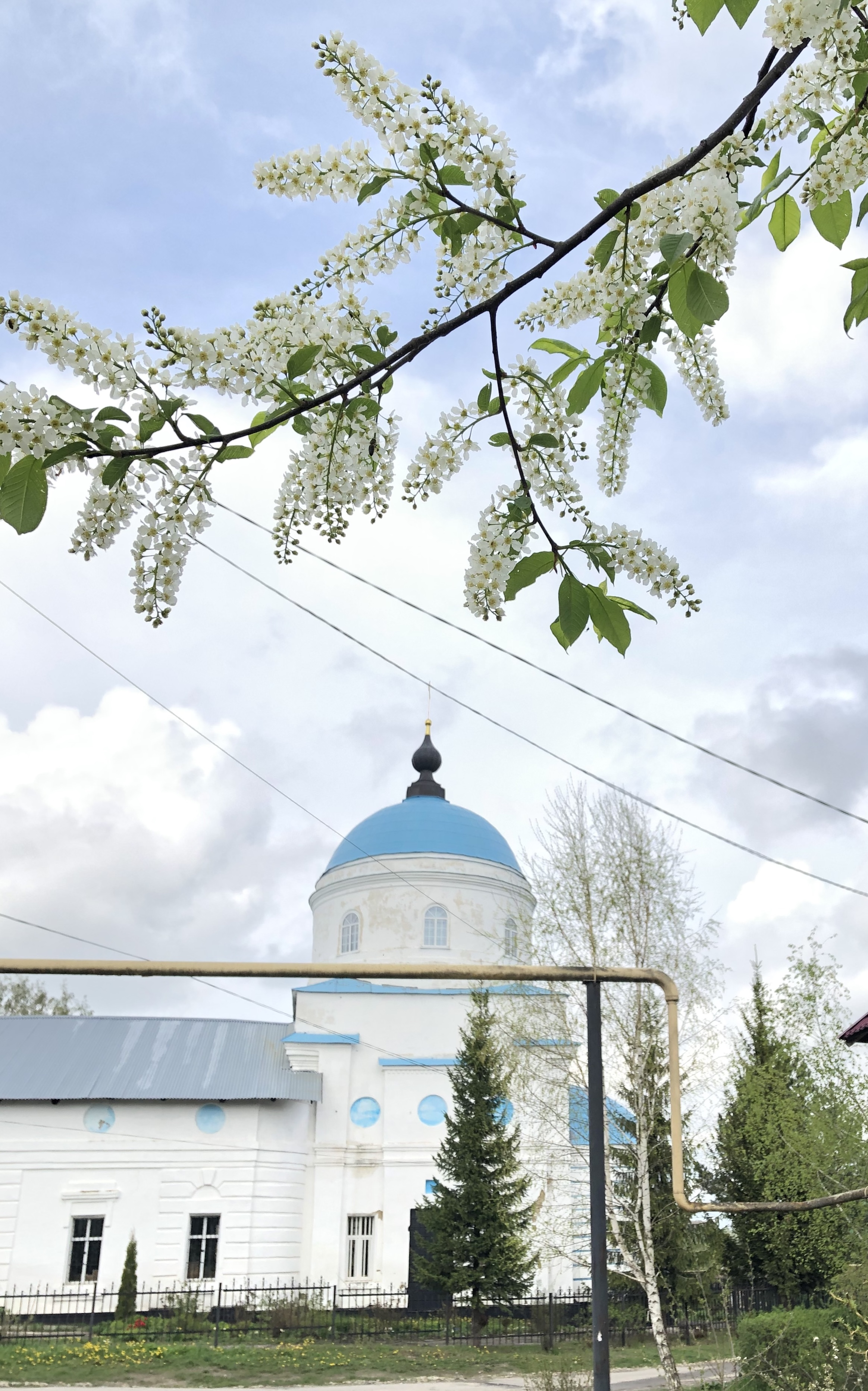
- Chekalin Church

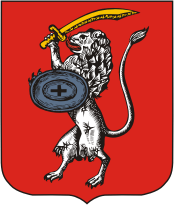
- Coat of arms
- Interactive map of Chekalin
- Location of Chekalin Chekalin (Tula Oblast)
- Coordinates: 54°06′N 36°15′E
- Country: Russia
- Federal subject: Tula Oblast
- Administrative district: Suvorovsky District
- Town under district jurisdictionSelsoviet: Chekalin
- Founded: 1565 (Julian)
- Elevation: 190 m (620 ft)

Population
  - Estimate (2025): 884 )

Administrative status
  - Capital of: Chekalin Town Under District Jurisdiction

Municipal status
  - Municipal district: Suvorovsky Municipal District
  - Urban settlement: Chekalin Urban Settlement
  - Capital of: Chekalin Urban Settlement
- Time zone: UTC+3 (MSK)
- Postal code: 301414
- OKTMO ID: 70640108001

Chekalin (Russian: Чека́лин), formerly known as Likhvin (Лихвин) until 1945, is a town in Suvorovsky District of Tula Oblast, Russia, located on the left bank of the Oka River. Population: 994 (2010 census); 1,151 (2002 census); 1,319 (1989 Soviet census). In 2010 it was the least populous inhabited locality in Russia with town status. For awhile, the smallest town in Russia was Innopolis with 96 inhabitants according to the 2016 Census, but since then has grown to a population of 3,955, and Chekalin is back to being the smallest town in Russia, with a population of 884 according to the 2024 census.

== History ==
During World War II, Likhvin was under German occupation from 19 October 1941 until 26 December 1941. In 1944, Likhvin was renamed Chekalin in honor of Soviet partisan Alexander Chekalin.

== Administrative and municipal status ==
Within the framework of administrative divisions, it is incorporated within Suvorovsky District as Chekalin Town Under District Jurisdiction. As a municipal division, Chekalin Town Under District Jurisdiction is incorporated within Suvorovsky Municipal District as Chekalin Urban Settlement.
