= Chekalov =

Chekalov (masculine, Russian: Чекалов) or Chekalova (feminine, Russian: Чекалова) is a Russian surname. Notable people with the surname include:

- Valery Chekalov (1976–2023), Russian mercenary leader
- Vladimir Chekalov (1922–1992), Russian and Soviet realist painter
