= SS Kolno =

Cargo ship

History
- Name: Nordcoke (1936–1940); Nordlicht (1940–1945); Empire Conwear (1945–1946); Armavir (1946–1947); Kolno (1947–1983)
- Owner: F Krupp AG (1936–1940); Kriegsmarine (1940–1945); Ministry of War Transport (1945); Ministry of Transport (1945–1946); Soviet Government (1946–1947); Żegluga Polska Line (1947–1971)
- Operator: Norddeutsche Kohlen- und Kokswerke AG (1936–1940); Kriegsmarine (1940–1945); James Westoll Ltd (1945–1946); Soviet Government (1946–1947); Żegluga Polska Line (1947–1971)
- Port of registry: (Nazi Germany) Hamburg (1936–1940); (Nazi Germany) Kriegsmarine (1940–1945); (United Kingdom) London (1945–1946); (Soviet Union) Arkhangelsk (1946–1947); (Poland) Szczecin (1947–1971)
- Builder: Lübecker Flenderwerke AG
- Launched: 1936
- Completed: December 1936
- Out of service: 1971–1983
- Homeport: (Poland) Świnoujście (1971–1983)
- Identification: Code Letters DJSI (1936–1945); Code Letters SPFB (1947–1971); United Kingdom Official Number 180741 (1945–1946)
- Fate: Scrapped

General characteristics
- Type: Cargo ship
- Tonnage: 2,487 GRT (1936–1945); 2,491 GRT (1945–1978); 1,297 NRT
- Length: 297 ft 0 in (90.53 m)
- Beam: 44 ft 5 in (13.54 m)
- Draught: 18 ft 4 in (5.59 m)
- Depth: 17 ft 9 in (5.41 m)
- Installed power: Compound steam engine
- Propulsion: Screw propeller

Kolno was a 2,487 GRT cargo ship that was built in 1936 as Nordcoke by Lübecker Flenderwerke AG, Lübeck, Germany. In 1940, she was requisitioned by the Kriegsmarine and was renamed Nordlicht. In 1945, she was seized by the Allies at Hamburg, passed to the Ministry of War Transport (MoWT) and was renamed Empire Conwear. In 1946, she was passed to the Soviet Union and renamed Armavir (ru. Армавир). In 1947, she was transferred to Poland and renamed Kolno. She served until 1971 when she ran aground off Falsterbo, Sweden, following which she served as a hulk until scrapped in 1983.

== Description ==
The ship was built in 1936 by Lübecker Flenderwerke AG, Lübeck. She was completed in December of that year.

The ship was 297 feet 0 inches (90.53 m) long, with a beam of 44 feet 5 inches (13.54 m). She had a depth of 14 feet 4 inches (4.37 m), and a draught of 18 feet 4 inches (5.59 m). As built, she was assessed as 2,497 GRT, 1,297 NRT.

The ship was propelled by a compound steam engine which had two cylinders of 20 1/16 inches (51 cm) and two cylinders of 43 5/16 inches (110 cm) diameter by 43 5/16 inches (110 cm) stroke. The engine was built by Lübecker Flenderwerke.

Most notable for a ship of her time is, that Nordcoke was equipped with large-scale hatch openings, which measured 10 by 10 metres, covered by steel hatch covers. The background of this new system was a faster handling of her cargoes, mainly coal and iron ore by means like mechanical grabs and further time-saving during opening and closing of those folding-type steel covers.

== History ==
Nordcoke was built for F Krupp, Essen. Her port of registry was Hamburg and the Code Letters DJSI were allocated. She was operated under the management of Norddeutsche Kohlen- und Koks Werke AG. In 1940, she was requisitioned by the Kriegsmarine and was renamed Nordlicht.

In May 1945, Nordlicht was captured by the Allies at Hamburg. She was passed to the MoWT and renamed Empire Conwear. Assessed as 2,487 GRT, the United Kingdom Official Number 180741 was allocated. She was operated under the management of James Westoll Ltd. Her port of registry was London. In 1946, she was allocated to the Soviet Union and was renamed Armavir. Her port of registry was Arkhangelsk.

In 1947, she was renamed Kolno and transferred to Poland, which handed it to the Żegluga Polska Line. Her port of registry was changed to Szczecin, and the Code Letters SPFB were allocated. On 14 March 1967, Kolno was in collision with the Danish cargo ship Østbornholm in the Odense River. On 7 January 1970, Kolno ran aground off Falsterbo, Sweden. She was subsequently rebuilt for use as a floating boilerhouse and based at Świnoujście until she was scrapped in April 1983.
