= Main Directorate for Public Order Maintenance =

Patrol police of Russia

Main Directorate for Public Order Maintenance Patrol police
- Chevron of the Patrol police of Russia

- Emblem of the Patrol Police of Russia

- Badge of the Patrol police of Russia
- Abbreviation: GUOOOP
- Motto: Serve Russia, Serve the law

Agency overview
- Formed: September 2, 1923

Jurisdictional structure
- Operations jurisdiction: RUS
- Governing body: Police of Russia
- General nature: Civilian police

Operational structure
- Headquarters: Moscow, Russia
- Agency executive: Yury Valyaev, Commander
- Parent agency: Ministry of Internal Affairs

Notables
- Anniversary: 2 September

Website
- mvd.ru

The Main Directorate for Public Order Maintenance of the Ministry of Internal Affairs of Russia (Russian: Главное управление по обеспечению охраны общественного порядка, ГУОООП) is a structural unit of the central apparatus of the Ministry of Internal Affairs of Russia.

It carries out functions for the implementation of public policy in the field of public order and security and the organizational management of public security police units. It is the so-called “face” of the Russian police, since the employees of this particular unit are constantly visible in public places.

== Structure and organisation ==
- Patrol Service;
- Department of analysis and development of strategic decisions in ensuring the protection of public order;
- Department of organization and coordination of activities in the field of public order protection;
- Department of the organization of inquiry;
- Department of the licensing and permitting.

== History ==
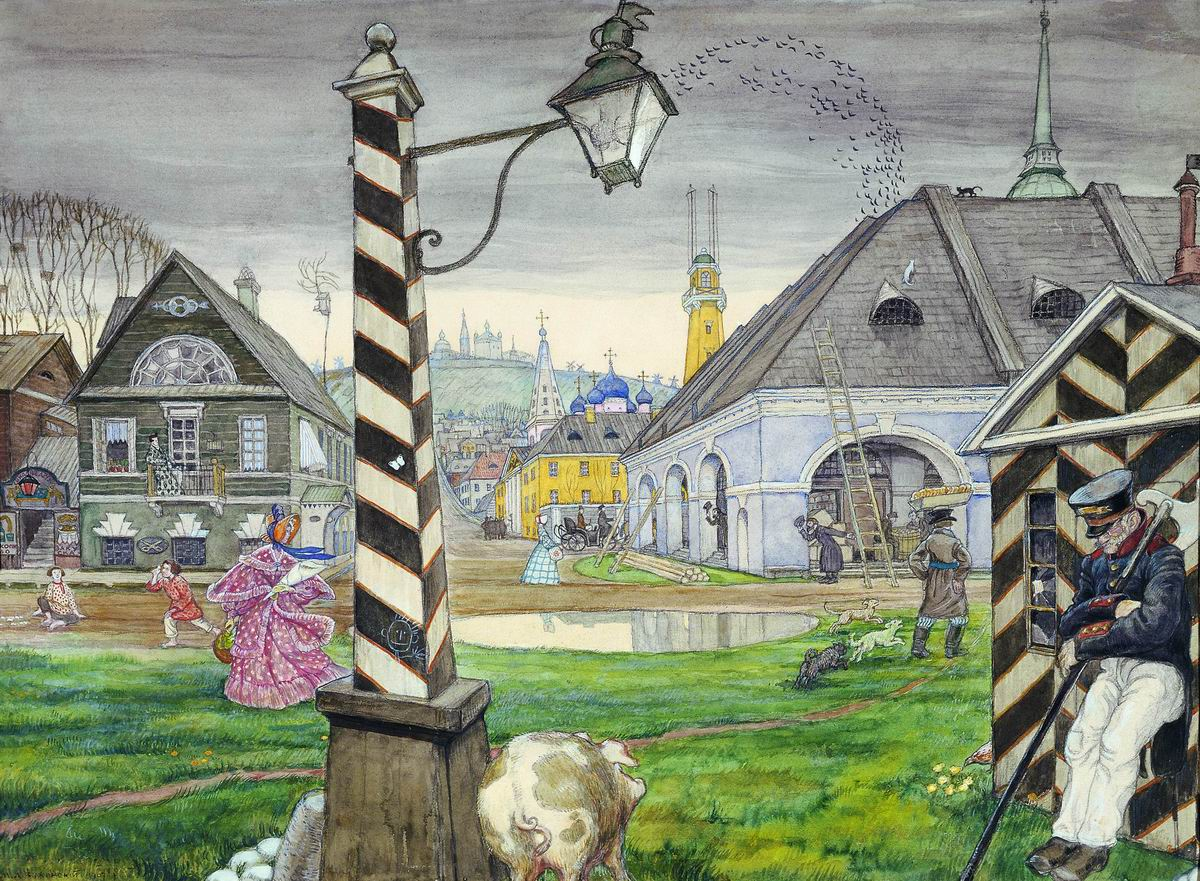
Guard policeman. The Russian Empire.

Data on the protection of public order can be found in historical documents back in the days of Kievan Rus'. Under the orders of the princes, the Druzhina were engaged in the fight against crime on the territory of the principalities. To do this, they attracted free people - community members.

On April 30 (May 10), 1649, Tsar Alexis issued a decree “on urban deanery,” where, in addition to organizing fire brigade, the first regulatory framework for public order protection was enshrined:

... and ride in his own county along all the streets and lanes, day and night, in incessance. And for security on all streets and in the alleys to put watchmen; and in the streets and in the alleys, day and night, walk and guard so that in the streets and in the alleys of robbery, tobacco and no theft and fornication

After the reforms of Peter the Great, the police were formed. A regular police force appeared in the cities, responsible for ordering the streets and other public places.

The reign of Alexander I can be considered a new era in the development of law enforcement services in Russia. On September 8 (20), 1802, he published a manifesto on the establishment of ministries, which included the Ministry of Internal Affairs. In 1804, by order of the Minister of the Interior, Viktor Kochubey, the external police was introduced. On July 3 (15), 1811, the Regulation on the Internal Guard was approved, the duties of which included: the capture of thieves, the prosecution and extermination of robbers, the pacification of disobedience and violence, the capture of fugitive criminals, and the maintenance of order at fairs and festivals. For the first time the concept of “police patrol service” is found in the Statute on the Metropolitan Police, approved in 1838. During this period, the number of police booths is increasing in many cities.

The main executive link in the police was the police station, led by the bailiff. He was subordinate to one officer and clerk. The site was divided into halves, led by near-warders, city guards and janitors. In 1917, after the October Revolution, the Ministry of Internal Affairs was liquidated along with the police.

On September 2, 1923, by order of the Central Administrative Department of the NKVD of the RSFSR No. 4, the “Instruction to the militiaman on guard” was approved, which sets out the general provisions on policing and the duties of a militiaman. In particular patrol policing and public order regulations were issued to ensure the militia would play a general role in protecting public order and safety within Russia. This date is today marked as the general anniversary of the Main Directorate for Public Order Maintenance.

== Commanders ==
- Major General of Police Viktor Vorobyov (September 23, 1994 – January 7, 1995)
- Lieutenant General of Police Ivan Golubev (1995–1999)
- Lieutenant General of Police Alexander Chekalin (1999–2000)
- Colonel General of Police Nikolai Pershutkin (October 2000 – September 24, 2007)
- Lieutenant General of Police Yuri Demidov (2009 – March 10, 2014)
- Lieutenant General of Police Yuri Valyaev (March 10, 2014 – September 22, 2020)
- Lieutenant General of Police Leonid Vedenov (acting from September 22 to November 25, 2020)
- Lieutenant General of Police Mikhail Davydov (November 25, 2020 – December 4, 2023)
- Major General of Police Lenar Gabdurakhmanov (since December 4, 2023)
