= Alexander Chekalin (partisan) =

Soviet partisan (1925–1941)

Alexander Pavlovich Chekalin
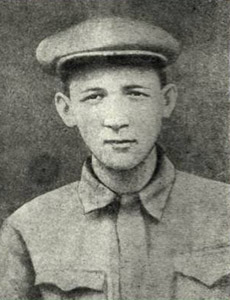
- Born: 25 March 1925
- Died: 6 November 1941 (aged 16); Tula Oblast
- Military career
- Allegiance: Soviet Union
- Awards: Hero of the Soviet Union; Order of Lenin

Alexander (Shura) Pavlovich Chekalin (Russian: Алекса́ндр Па́влович Чека́лин; 25 March 1925 – 6 November 1941) was a Russian teenager, Soviet partisan, and Hero of the Soviet Union.

Chekalin was captured, tortured, and hanged for partisan activities in Tula Oblast near Moscow during the German-Soviet War.

== Biography ==
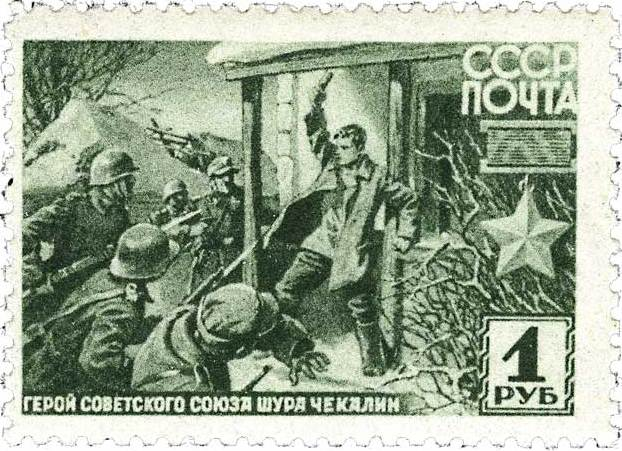
Chekalin's deed is shown on a Soviet stamp issued in 1942

Alexander Pavlovich Chekalin was born on 25 March 1925 in the village of Peskovatoye, Likhvinsky Uyezd, Kaluga Governorate of the RSFSR.

Sixteen-year-old Shura Chekalin engaged in underground resistance activities in the region of Tula near Moscow. In the first days of November 1941, he took part in an ambush of German vehicles, destroying one vehicle with a hand-grenade. After becoming ill, Chekalin was bedridden, and his location was betrayed to the Germans by an unknown informant. When Germans approached to arrest him, he threw a hand grenade at them, but it failed to explode. He was brutally tortured, and hanged on 6 November 1941. His body was left hanging for twenty days, taken down only after the area had been retaken by the Red Army.

== Awards ==
- Hero of the Soviet Union (posthumously; 4 February 1942)
- Order of Lenin (1942)

== Memory ==
In 1944 Likhvin city was renamed to Chekalin.
