= Alexander Chekalin (politician) =

Russian politician

Colonel General Alexander Chekalin
- Александр Чекалин
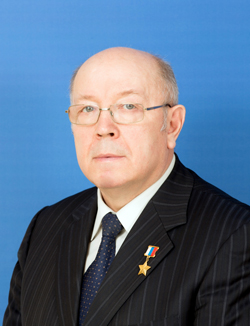

Russian Federation Senator from the Udmurt Republic
- In office 12 May 2008 – 17 September 2017
- Preceded by: Viktor Shudegov
- Succeeded by: Lyubov Glebova

First Deputy Minister of Interior
- In office July 2004 – 24 March 2008
- Succeeded by: Mikhail Sukhodolsky

Deputy Minister of Interior — Head of the FMS
- In office 2003–2004
- Preceded by: Andrei Chernenko
- Succeeded by: Andrei Chernenko

Deputy Minister of Interior
- In office 2000–2003

Commander of the Main Directorate for Public Order Maintenance
- In office 1999–2000
- Preceded by: Ivan Golubev
- Succeeded by: Nikolai Pershutkin

Personal details
- Born: 6 September 1947 (age 78) Vereya, Moscow Oblast, RSFSR, Soviet Union
- Party: United Russia
- Awards: Alt text Order of the Badge of Honour

Military service
- Years of service: 1969–2008
- Rank: Colonel General

Alexander Alexeevich Chekalin (Russian: Алекса́ндр Алексе́евич Чека́лин) (b. 6 September 1947) is a Russian politician who served as the First Deputy Minister of the Interior of Russia from 2000 to 2008. He expressed his support for mass arrests of protestors in the week leading up to the 32nd G8 summit, which was held in St. Petersburg from 15 - 17 July 2006.

== Honours and awards ==
- Hero of the Russian Federation (2000)
- Order of Merit for the Fatherland, 3rd class (2008) and 4th class (2004)
- Order of Honour (2006)
- Order of Friendship (2006)
- Order of the Badge of Honour (1986)
- Medals of the Order of Merit for the Fatherland, 1st class (1998) and 2nd class (1995)
- Order of Saint Righteous Grand Duke Dmitry Donskoy, 2nd class (Russian Orthodox Church, 2007)
- Candidate of Legal Sciences
- Honored Worker of the Interior Ministry
- Honorary Worker of the Interior Ministry
- Honorary Member of Russian Academy of Arts
- Medal "In Commemoration of the 850th Anniversary of Moscow"
- Medal "In Commemoration of the 300th Anniversary of Saint Petersburg"
- Medal of Merit in the conduct of national census

== See also ==
- List of Heroes of the Russian Federation
