= Propaganda in the Russian educational system =

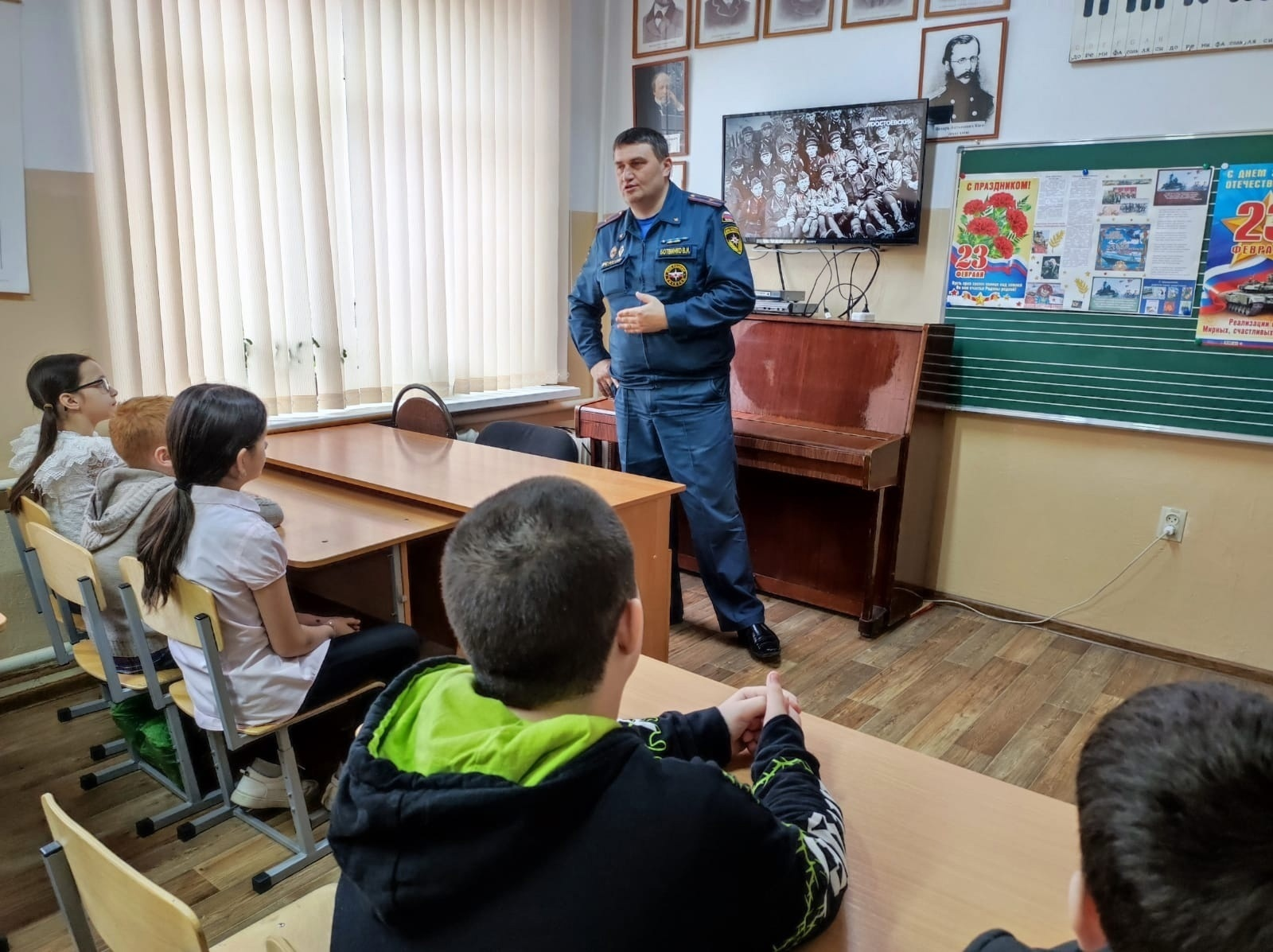
A Ministry of Emergency Situations employee inside a classroom during a Conversations about Important Things class in 2024

Propaganda in the Russian educational system is a purposeful state policy that uses educational institutions, from kindergartens to universities, for the ideological processing of the younger generation and the formation of loyalty to the current political regime. After the beginning of Russian invasion of Ukraine in 2022, this process became comprehensive and systemic.

In political systems with authoritarian traits, the education system is often used as a tool for propaganda and strengthening the regime. In modern Russia under president Vladimir Putin, educational policy has placed a strong emphasis on state patriotism and the formation of loyalty to the authorities.

== Kindergartens ==
Since the beginning of 2022, pro-war actions using the symbols of military actions (in particular, the letter Z) have been introduced in state kindergartens of the Russian Federation. The initiation took place through flash mobs, which involved the formation of children in the form of the specified symbol. Subsequently, the activities became systematic: the educational process included meetings with military personnel, making gifts for combatants, learning thematic songs and watching ideologically oriented animated content. Usually, the management of kindergartens does not ask parents for consent to such activities. There are cases where parents have been brought to administrative responsibility for disagreeing with such practices.

== Schools ==
In 2003, Russian President Vladimir Putin spoke about the need to create history textbooks that would contain "facts that foster a sense of pride in young people for their country." In May 2009, the Presidential Commission to Counter Attempts to Falsify History to the Detriment of Russia's Interests was established. In 2012, Putin, noting the large number and different level of quality of teaching aids, advocated standardization in this area, emphasizing the importance of forming common approaches to the study of history and other humanitarian disciplines.

In 2015, the Ministry of Education and Science of the Russian Federation announced the introduction of a unified line of history textbooks, developed on the basis of the previously adopted historical and cultural standard. At the same time, a number of teachers and historians criticized these textbooks, calling them propaganda. In particular, in textbooks for grades 10-11, the events in Ukraine in 2014 were described as the coming to power of nationalists, the Yukos case was called "the result of the struggle for the timely and full receipt of taxes," and the relationship between the government and the church was called "the desire to revive the greatness of Russia". In addition, as a result of the reform, almost the entire textbook market was taken under control by structures close to Putin's friend Arkady Rotenberg.

Educational institutions and educational literature are one of the channels for disseminating the official state position. Examples include the use of educational materials with poems dedicated to the president, the placement of his portraits in schools, and the holding of thematic essay and drawing competitions in educational institutions during election campaigns. During the 2012 presidential election, parents of students at a number of regional schools were illegally questioned as to whether they believed that "subversive espionage by Americans could undermine the integrity of the country". According to schoolchildren, teachers can openly impose their point of view.

As Helga Pirogova, a former Novosibirsk deputy and member of the "Alliance of Teachers," points out in an interview with the LRT project, the turning point in the strengthening of state propaganda and the militarization of the educational process was 2014, after the annexation of Crimea, when the authorities began to systematically strengthen ideological control over schools.

Russian schools hold political and patriotic assemblies, and schoolchildren are forced to participate in propaganda events and flash mobs. Following the mass detentions of high school students during the March 2017 protests, a large number of videos appeared online showing intimidation or pressure being exerted on young people. For example, in one recording, a teacher at a school in Tomsk openly called his students fascists and "slaves of the Anglo-Saxons" for criticizing the government. To establish direct contact with young people, the authorities held several media events: a direct line for high school students and an "open lesson" with the president.

=== 2022 - present ===
After the beginning of Russian invasion of Ukraine, activities aimed at the patriotic education of youth and explaining the official state position were intensified in educational institutions of the Russian Federation. In particular, methodological recommendations for conducting classes dedicated to the country's foreign policy course were sent to schools and universities. Social studies teachers in grades 7-11 were instructed to conduct thematic lessons, within which students were to be familiarized with the content of speeches by Russian President Vladimir Putin concerning the reasons and goals of the "special military operation." During these classes, students were informed that the armed forces of the Russian Federation are aimed at completing military tasks while minimizing casualties among the civilian population. These recommendations also included advice to condemn calls for participation in unauthorized public actions.

In March 2022, a nationwide open lesson titled "Defenders of Peace" was conducted in all schools across the country. Its content was dedicated to the "liberation mission" in Ukraine. During the lesson, it was asserted that the cause of the military action was the "five waves of NATO expansion," and the goal of the invasion was stated as defending Russia from a hypothetical attack that could occur in several years.

Homeroom teachers conducted thematic lessons based on the provided methodological guidelines. There were reports of cases where teachers were dismissed for refusing to participate in such events. Administrations of some schools recommended that teachers use symbols, including St. George's ribbons stylized as the letter Z. In March 2022, a meeting was organized for homeroom teachers of schools in the capital with RT editor-in-chief Margarita Simonyan and Russian Foreign Ministry spokesperson Maria Zakharova, during which issues of countering disinformation (fakes) under wartime conditions were discussed.

In March–April 2022, educational institutions were instructed to conduct special social studies lessons explaining the causes and essence of the "anti-Russian sanctions." The recommended materials presented the sanctions imposed by Western countries as a response to Russia's invasion, which was purportedly caused by the "necessity to protect the population of Donbas".

Since 2022, schoolchildren have been encouraged to participate in workshops on making "trench candles" — autonomous sources of light and heat. This activity has been covered in state media as a socially beneficial endeavor.

Starting September 1, 2022, a weekly series of extracurricular classes called "Conversations about Important Things" was included in the mandatory program of all general education institutions in the Russian Federation. According to official documents, the goal of these sessions is to form value orientations in students, including love for the Motherland, pride in their country, and patriotism. Although these classes are formally not part of the core curriculum, in a number of cases, refusal to attend "Conversations about Important Things" was considered by school administrations as a disciplinary violation, which could lead to disciplinary measures against students.

Additionally, the practice of holding solemn Monday assemblies with the raising of the Russian national flag was revived. The initial version of the methodological materials developed by the Russian Ministry of Education included a section dedicated to the "special military operation" in Ukraine, presenting it in the context of protecting civilians and historical unity. Later, due to dissatisfaction from students' parents, the topics of the lessons were adjusted, and references to Ukraine were removed from the publicly available methodological guidelines.

Since September 2022, a solemn ceremony of raising the state flag and performing the national anthem has been held weekly in all state schools in Russia. The initiative, proposed by Putin in 2021, is being implemented within the approved standard and funded from the state budget.

During this same period, against the backdrop of the mobilization announcement, work in schools to support participants of the Russian invasion of Ukraine has intensified. This activity includes campaigns to write letters and collect humanitarian parcels for military personnel. Educational institutions have also begun inviting individuals who took part in combat operations, including representatives of volunteer formations such as the Wagner PMC, to meet with students. In memory of fallen graduates, memorial "Hero's Desks" are being installed in some schools.

Patriotic flash mobs were organized across the country, during which students formed the shapes of the letters Z and V.

As part of strengthening the patriotic education of youth in Russia, alongside the already existing "Yunarmiya" movement, a new nationwide movement for children and youth called the "Movement of the First" was established in 2022. Furthermore, starting from the new academic year, a course in basic military training, which had been removed from the compulsory curriculum after 1991, is being reintroduced into the school program. According to the Minister of Education of the Russian Federation, Sergei Kravtsov, this course can be taught, among others, by war participants.

In December 2022, changes to the federal state educational standards were approved. "Basic military training" was integrated into the Life Safety Fundamentals (OBZh) course for high school students. Simultaneously, a thematic block dedicated to events related to the war in Ukraine was included in the school history curriculum. In some history teaching materials, mentions of Kievan Rus began to be removed. A patriotically-oriented text was included in the trial materials for the Unified State Exam (EGE) in the Russian language. It's an artistic description of a combat episode in Mariupol, during which a Russian military unit under the command of a fighter with the call sign "Mangush" conducts a clearance operation. The plot describes the detonation of armored vehicles on a mine, enemy resistance, and the subsequent successful evacuation of personnel.

As part of the OBZh subject, which is transforming into "Basics of Security and Homeland Defense," children are taught to dig trenches, work with drones, and weave camouflage nets. Combat veterans are actively invited to schools, whose stories, according to Helga Pirogova, romanticize violence. State policy, it is claimed, aims to cultivate "obedient citizens" with "square heads" who don't ask questions. Resistance to this trend from teachers is hindered by an atmosphere of denunciations, and the mass departure of educators (193,000 in 2023) exacerbates the staffing crisis and contributes to the further degradation of the educational environment. All of this, according to Pirogova's assessment, leads to the psychological traumatization of generations and has profound destructive consequences for the future of Russian society.

Since 2022, Russian law enforcement practice regarding minors has seen cases of them being held accountable for expressing positions contradicting the official state line. According to information from the human rights organization "OVD-Info," at least 565 detentions of minors were documented between February 2022 and April 2023. Some of these detentions involved taking the minors to police stations for questioning or conversations without the presence of their legal representatives, which, according to a number of human rights advocates, may not comply with established procedures. Based on media reports and data from human rights groups, these actions were taken in response to online posts about anti-war rallies, distribution of leaflets against mobilization, participation in solo pickets, statements made in educational institutions, as well as wearing clothing with inscriptions criticizing the military actions.

Starting in 2022, Russia has seen the initiation of high-profile administrative and criminal cases related to public criticism of the invasion, involving minors. One such case concerns Masha Moskalyova, a minor girl from a family in the Tula Oblast. Her father, Alexey Moskalyov, was charged under the article on "discrediting the Russian Armed Forces," resulting in a conviction. Masha, who was under his care, was temporarily placed in a social care institution.

Pro-war agitation is openly conducted in schools, institutes, and other educational institutions. The authorities held explanatory lectures and "preventive conversations." In them, they promoted statements such as "Donbas was bombed for eight years," "Russia is liberating Ukraine from Nazism," and "we will develop import substitution". In special history lessons, schoolchildren are inculcated with the official position of the authorities and taught the "correct" history of Ukraine. For example, on March 3, 2022, a series of open lessons titled "Defenders of Peace," dedicated to the so-called "liberation mission in Ukraine," were held across the country; on October 17, 2022, a "Lesson of Courage" was held, during which children wrote letters to soldiers. Municipalities came forward with initiatives to create "Alleys of Heroes", schools were required to start classes with a lineup featuring the raising of the state flag and the national anthem. Additional lessons called "Conversations about Important Things" were introduced, attempting to conduct patriotic education. The rally at Luzhniki Stadium in honor of the eighth anniversary of the annexation of Crimea was broadcast by all major Russian TV channels, and for the event itself, which had over 200,000 participants, state employees and students were mobilized.

Amidst changes affecting the educational and socio-political spheres, significant personnel shifts have been observed within the school system. According to official statistics and a number of independent studies, a substantial number of teaching staff had left schools by the start of the 2023/2024 academic year. The reason for some teachers' dismissals may have been disagreements with school administration over teaching methodology or anti-war positions.

In March 2023, instances of incorporating patriotic songs into the educational process were recorded in a number of Russian schools. For example, at a school in Yekaterinburg, fifth-graders were asked in a music lesson to learn the song "Ya russkiy" (lit. 'I am Russian') by the singer Shaman, which gained widespread traction in the media space following the start of the invasion. Similarly, an event was organized at a school in Kazan where students performed synchronized hand movements to this same song.

In the spring of 2023, a regional educational project called "An Alphabet of Important Things" was announced in the Far East, intended for kindergarteners and elementary school students. The project aims to familiarize children with basic concepts such as "army," "faith," "honor," "Fatherland," "Motherland," and "traditions." A pilot implementation was planned, with the possibility for public discussion and content additions.

Starting September 1, 2023, a new unified history textbook has been introduced for 10th and 11th grades, prepared under the editorship of Russian Presidential Aide Vladimir Medinsky. The textbook includes a section dedicated to Russian invasion of Ukraine and features revised chapters covering the period from the 1970s to the 2000s. The text characterizes Ukraine as an "ultra-nationalist state." A number of historians and experts have criticized the textbook for excessive ideological bias and a tendentious interpretation of contemporary events, particularly the war in Ukraine.

Since September 2023, the position of a "Director's Advisor on Upbringing and Interaction with Children's Public Associations" has been added to the staffing schedule of general education institutions. The advisor's duties include organizing educational work, including patriotic events.

Starting September 1, 2024, the subject "Fundamentals of Life Safety" has been transformed into the course "Fundamentals of Security and Homeland Defense." Within its framework, a module on basic military training has been integrated, including familiarization with weapons, drill training, and the study of military regulations.

Starting in the 2024-2025 school year, the "Family Studies" course was introduced in Russian schools, aimed at forming students' understanding of family values, preparing them for future family life, and conscious parenthood. The course can be adapted for different age groups, including elementary school.

In 2024, funding for the federal project "Patriotic Education of Citizens of the Russian Federation" was significantly increased. The federal budget allocates about 46 billion rubles for its implementation, which substantially exceeds the 2022 allocation of 5 billion rubles. In April 2024, the idea of creating a separate ministry to coordinate matters of patriotic education was publicly voiced.

As of September 2025, all school and parent group chats are being transferred to the national messenger platform "Max". It has also been actively promoted in Russian schools during "Conversations about Important Things" lessons.

From September 1, 2026, as part of a redistribution of teaching hours, a reduction in time allocated to foreign language study in grades 5-7 is planned. The freed-up hour is intended to be allocated to the subject "Spiritual and Moral Culture of Russia," which was introduced in 2023. According to methodological recommendations, one of the course's goals is to shape values through the study of biographies, including those of "heroes of the special military operation".

== Universities ==
Following the anti-corruption rally on March 26, 2017, there was an increase in the number of lectures on patriotic education in schools and universities. In June 2017, employees of the Kurchatov Institute were invited to a lecture titled "The Investigation of the 9/11 Tragedy and How the USA Works" by Andrey Medvedev. Initially, the "Kurchatov Thursdays" lectures were popular science events but later acquired a political undertone.

In March 2022, the Russian Union of Rectors, which unites the heads of leading universities, circulated a statement calling for support of "our country, our army, which is defending our security, [and] support for our president, who has made perhaps the most difficult, well-considered, but necessary decision of his life." The text was signed by over 260 rectors. Simultaneously, the Ministry of Education and Science recommended that universities conduct special lectures for students on Russian history and "fighting fake news." Despite criticism from some educators who described the teaching materials as low-quality and propagandistic, such sessions were organized. For instance, at Tomsk Polytechnic University, students were given a lecture on Ukraine's "anti-Russian path," and within the topic of fake news, state media and the Russian Ministry of Defense website were cited as trusted sources of information.

In mid-March 2022, as part of events marking the anniversary of Crimea's annexation, the "Crimean Bridge" and "Crimean Spring" rallies were held in Kirov with the participation of local university students. According to students, attendance at the events was motivated by instructions from teachers or class monitors, and in some cases by the promise of a pass on a graded assignment. At the March 18th rally, students lined up in the shape of the "Z" symbol. Belgorod State University also organized an online campaign #WeAreTogether, during which international students from a number of countries voiced support for Russia's position, justifying it with security concerns.

In universities, propaganda is promoted during lectures on "patriotic education," and in some cases, youth are also forced to participate in pro-war rallies. Lecturers who disagree with the official rhetoric, for example at MGIMO and the Higher School of Economics, have faced pressure from their superiors. Students who openly speak out against the war have faced the threat of expulsion. Reports of intimidation and "preventive conversations" have come from Moscow State University, MGIMO, the Saint Petersburg State Pediatric Medical University, the Saint Petersburg State University of Aerospace Instrumentation, Plekhanov Russian University of Economics, Krasnoyarsk State Pedagogical University, the Saint Petersburg State University of Industrial Technologies and Design, and many others. At the RANEPA dormitory, students were compelled to turn on their lights in the evening to create a photo of a glowing "Z" symbol on the facade. Students are gathered for pro-war flash mobs through threats or promises of extra credit.

Starting September 1, 2023, the subject "Fundamentals of Russian Statehood" has been introduced in all higher education institutions in Russia. Announced by Vladimir Putin at the end of 2022, the initiative is positioned by the authorities and its supporters as a means of fostering "conscious patriotism" among young people. However, this measure has been perceived by some experts and critics as a form of direct propaganda and the ideologization of education, aimed at cementing the official historical narrative and state values into the academic curriculum.

On November 10, 2025, the Russian Ministry of Science and Higher Education sent instructions to its subordinate organizations regarding the implementation of the national messenger "Max." According to the document, it was necessary to create chat groups for academic courses and institutional channels by November 17, and to submit a report on the implementation results by December 19. Deputy Minister of Digital Development Oleg Kachanov noted that the use of the "Max" messenger "is entirely voluntary," and that Russian law doesn't require mandatory registration in the messenger for receiving education at state educational institutions. At the same time, according to the Ministry of Digital Development, educational organizations may adopt legal acts regulating educational relations—if a student or parents refuse to install it, the question of an alternative method for receiving information about the educational process should be resolved with the involvement of the educational institution.

In the autumn of 2025, students and employees of higher educational institutions across Russia were universally forced to install "Max" and threatened with expulsion, dismissal, prohibition from taking exams, and other disciplinary measures. Kuban State University and the Ministry of Education of the Sverdlovsk Oblast recognized the expulsion of students for refusing to install "Max" as unlawful.
