= Conversations about Important Things =

Russian school subject

Logo for Conversations about Important Things, since 2025

Conversations about Important Things (Russian: Разговоры о важном, romanized: Razgovory o vazhnom, lit. 'Conversations about that which is important'), or Important Conversations for short, is a name for a series of compulsory school lessons in Russia that covers various topics from the Russian government's perspective, such as national identity, public holidays, and world events. Important Conversations lessons take place every Monday morning during the school year, following the flag-raising ceremony.

Important Conversations was developed by the Institute for Education Development Strategy, on behalf of the Russian Ministry of Education, and was part of a 17-year long effort by the Russian government to introduce "patriotic education" to schools in Russia. The first Important Conversations lessons took place nationwide on 5 September 2022, and are generally considered to be part of the Russian government's information war in relation to the Russo-Ukrainian war since 2022, which they call a "special military operation".

The Russian government has defended Important Conversations, claiming that it promotes "national unity, patriotism and traditional values". However, many teachers and parents have resisted the initiative as an attempt by the Russian government to introduce political propaganda and militarism into the education system. In response, teachers and students (along with their parents) have faced reprisals for not participating in Important Conversations lessons, in the context of the ongoing crackdown on protests against the invasion.

== Background ==
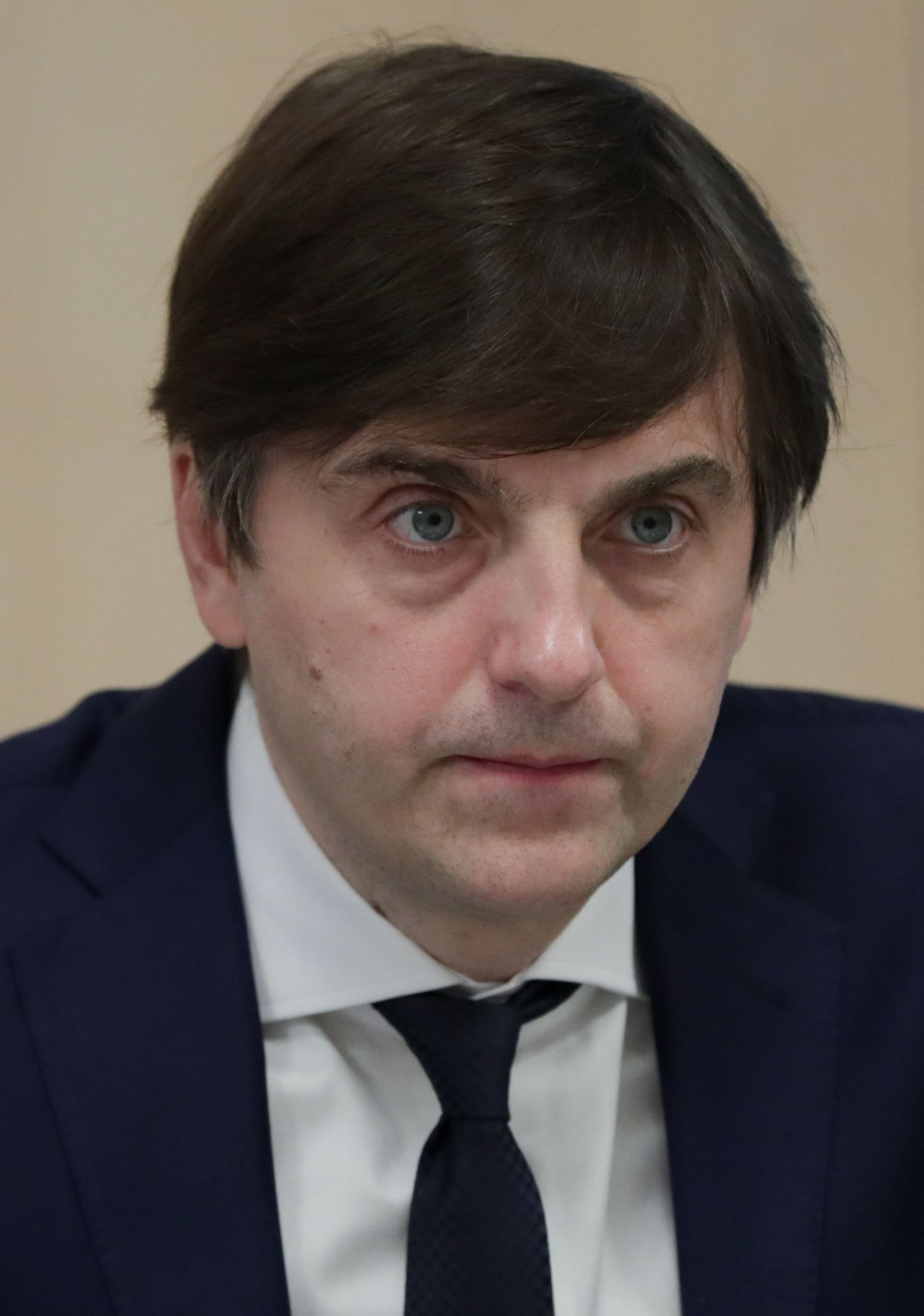
Sergey Kravtsov, one of the architects of Conversations about Important Things, in March 2022

The origins of using school lessons to promote "Russian values" go back to July 2005, when then-Prime Minister Mikhail Fradkov approved funding for a similar programme called "Patriotic Education for Citizens of the Russian Federation". According to geography teacher Kyamran Manafly, the government sent to schools materials for "patriotic lessons" for many years since 2005, but many teachers ignored them due to lack of interest from the students. On 21 May 2020, The Moscow Times reported that Russian President Vladimir Putin made another effort to introduce "patriotic lessons" by making citizenship and war history compulsory subjects under the Russian education law.

Following the Russian invasion of Ukraine in 2022, the Russian government increased their efforts to introduce "patriotic education" into schools, although some schools improvised such lessons or events shortly after the invasion started. According to The Moscow Times on 19 April 2022, the Minister of Education Sergey Kravtsov announced plans for children to study history from Class 1 onwards instead of Class 4, and for schools to hold a flag-raising ceremony (similar to the Pledge of Allegiance in the United States) every Monday morning, from the start of the 2022–2023 school year. Schools in the Kaluga and Voronezh oblasts introduced flag-raising ceremonies in mid-April.

Plans for more children to study history evolved into Conversations about Important Things, which was unveiled by Kravtsov and the Institute for Education Development Strategy on 20 June 2022: according to the Institute, Important Conversations aimed to teach history and socio-political values from the Russian government's perspective. The initial budget for the development of Important Conversations, which began in mid-April, was 22 million rubles, or about US$326,000 in 2022.

The first Important Conversations lessons took place nationwide on 5 September 2022, although Russian President Putin hosted an inaugural lesson with selected students in the Russian exclave of Kaliningrad, on 1 September 2022. From October 2024, the Ministry of Education trialled Important Conversations lessons in selected kindergartens, before announcing in February 2026 that "patriotic lessons" for kindergartens would be spun-off as Good Games (Russian: Добрые игры), with content similar to Important Conversations.

== Schedule and content ==
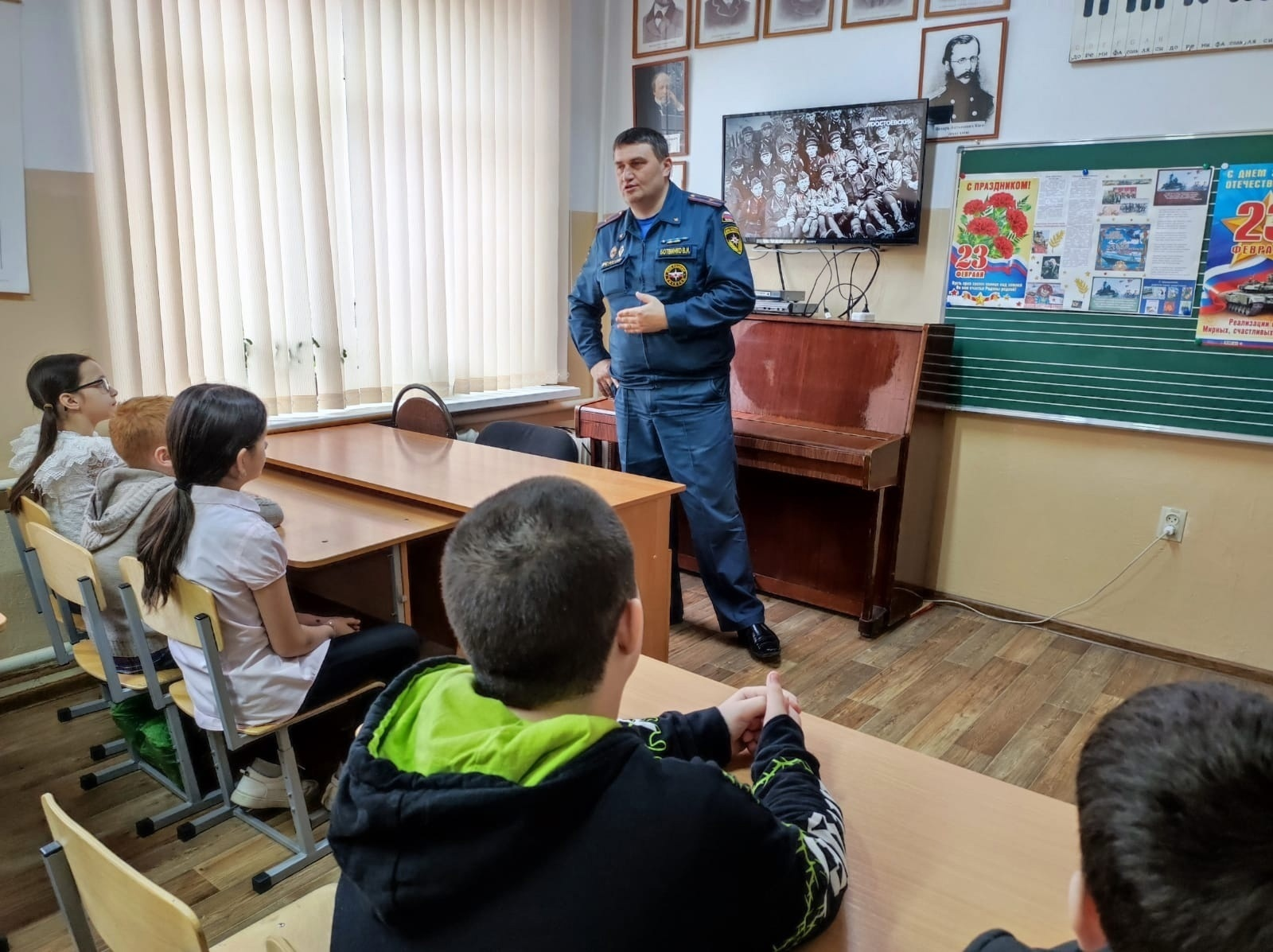
A Conversations about Important Things class, from February 2024

The Conversations about Important Things takes place every Monday from 09:00 local time, during the school year and after the flag-raising ceremony. Since 20 February 2023, Channel One Russia's Good Morning programme included a segment involving Important Conversations, every Monday at 08:36 Moscow Time (UTC+3).

The lessons cover various topics from the Russian government's perspective, such as national identity, public holidays, and world events. Some of the lesson plans reference developments associated with the Russo-Ukrainian war since 2022, which the Russian government calls a "special military operation", and attempt to cover up or deny widely documented evidence of war crimes committed by Russian forces. Each topic on the official website for Important Conversations lessons have separate sections for Classes 1–2, Classes 3–4, Classes 5–7, Classes 8–9, Classes 10–11 and Secondary Vocational Education.

According to The New York Times on 3 June 2023, local school administrators were responsible for implementing Important Conversations: this meant the actual amount of politics and propaganda in the lessons depended on the school administration's stance towards the Russian government. For example, one teacher forced students to sing and dance to Ya russkiy (Russian: Я русский, lit. 'I'm Russian') by Russian singer Shaman, while another taught algebra as an "important conversation" in the context of mathematics. However, filmmaker Pavel Talankin (co-director of the documentary film Mr Nobody Against Putin) stated that he had to send video evidence to the authorities to prove that his school in Karabash were following the lesson plans.

== Critical reception ==
At launch, Conversations about Important Things was unpopular with many teachers and parents, with many criticising the lessons as an attempt by the Russian government to introduce political propaganda into the education system, despite laws that did not allow it.

The Associated Press reported that some parents were shocked by the militaristic nature of Important Conversations lessons, with some comparing them to the "patriotic education" of the former Soviet Union. There was notable controversy over the lesson plan for Our country — Russia, which originally instructed teachers to tell students from Class 3 onwards that Russia was "more precious" than life (Russian: Счастье Родины дороже жизни), and that it was "not scary" to die for Russia (За Родину-мать не страшно умирать).

The opposition trade union Alliance of Teachers called for parents to boycott the lessons, and for teachers to either boycott the lessons as well, or to present them from a more critical perspective than that of the Russian government. The Associated Press reported cases of teachers attempting to depoliticise Important Conversations by developing their own content for the lessons.

The initial criticism resulted in the Russian Ministry of Education making revisions to the lesson material in an attempt to reduce mentions of the military and current events (such as the Russo-Ukrainian war), which included the removal of controversial passages from Our country — Russia. However, there is evidence that the lessons continue to actively reference the war. Teachers who refused to teach the lessons risk either losing their jobs or being designated as a "foreign agent", and some teachers have left (or considered leaving) Russia in protest of Important Conversations.

Parents have also called for the right to withdraw their children from Important Conversations lessons: although the Ministry of Education initially claimed that the lessons were voluntary extracurricular activities, Russian students and their parents have been investigated by the police, or threatened with expulsion, for refusing to attend Important Conversations lessons.

The Ministry of Education later admitted that the classes were compulsory, warning that students may be sanctioned for skipping the lessons. On 19 February 2023, the Kharkiv Human Rights Protection Group reported that the Minister of Education Sergey Kravtsov planned to make parents of students attend Important Conversations lessons.

== Analysis ==
In November 2022, Times Higher Education reported that academics had different opinions on how the Conversations about Important Things would affect the development of beliefs among Russian students. Professor Grigory Yudin of the Moscow School for the Social and Economic Sciences expressed concern that Important Conversations increased the risk of turning otherwise apathetic or anti-war students into "willing fighters". However, Professor Isak Froumin of the Higher School of Economics and researcher Svetlana Shenderova believed that Important Conversations would fail: Shenderova in particular stated that Important Conversations may backfire in the same way as scientific communism, by fuelling the students' hatred towards the Russian government's ideology, which includes Putinism.

== Related programmes ==
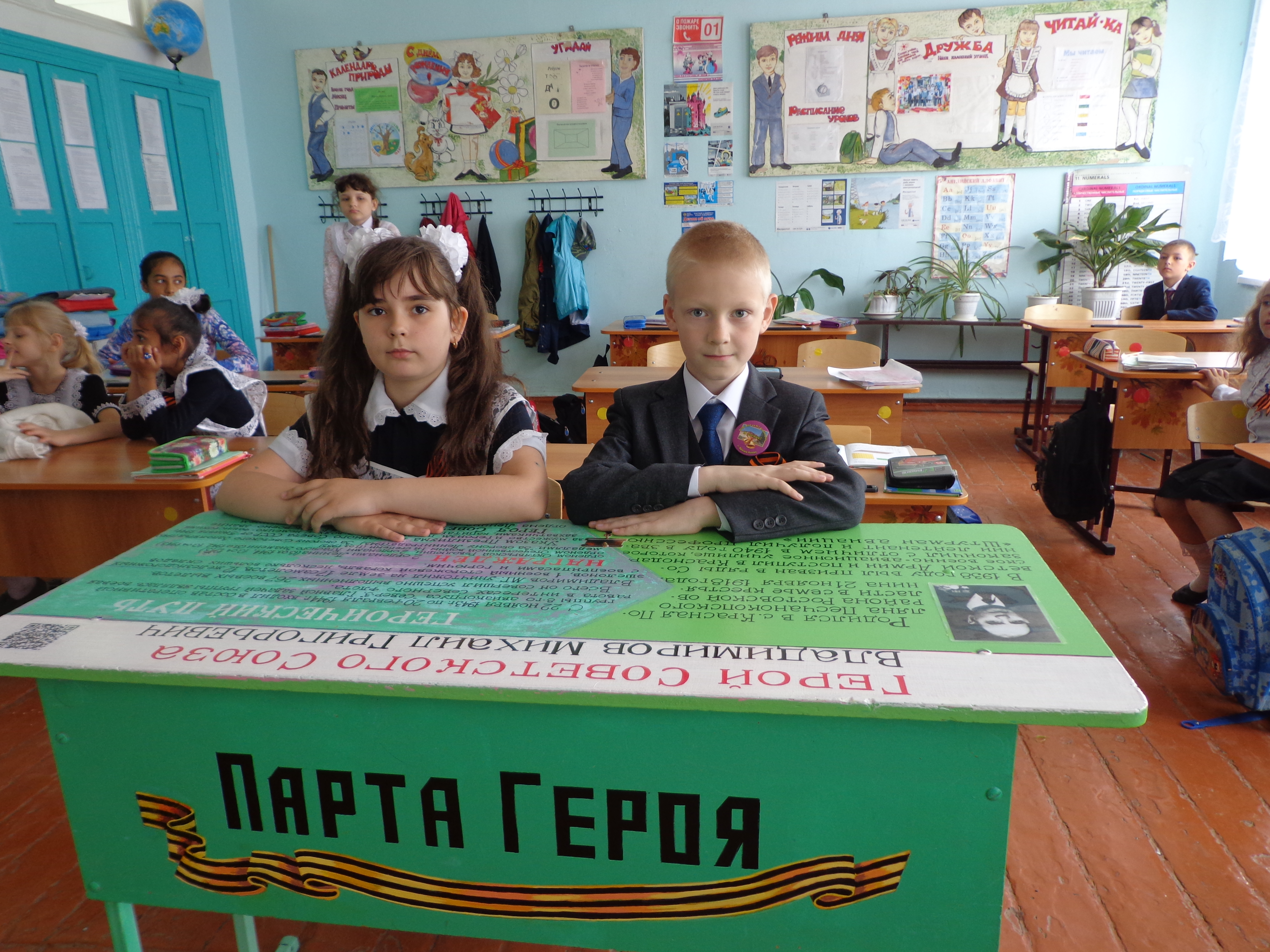
A Hero's Desk, in May 2018

In September 2023, the Russian government introduced a similar programme of "patriotic lessons" for universities, called Foundations of Russian Statehood (Russian: Основы российской государственности). The compulsory subject was developed by Andrey Polosin, a political scientist and deputy rector at the Russian Presidential Academy of National Economy and Public Administration, and is taught to first-year university students in their first semester. In February 2026, a similar programme called Good Games (Добрые игры) was announced for kindergartens, following trials of Conversations about Important Things lessons over there starting October 2024.

In the context of the militarisation of education, soldiers of the Russo-Ukrainian war (including Wagner Group mercenaries) have been invited to teach "Lessons of Courage" (Урок мужества) to students, while another project called "Your Hero" (Твой герой) trains demobilised soldiers to work with children. Schools have also installed specially decorated desks to commemorate former students who died fighting in the war: the desks are part of the "Heroes' Desk" project (Парта героя), first introduced in 2018 to commemorate Heroes of the Soviet Union and the Russian Federation. In August 2025, the Russian Ministry of Education published a list of "patriotic" songs that school music teachers should teach.

== List of Important Conversations lessons ==
=== 2022–2023 ===
The following topics were prescribed by the Russian Ministry of Education for the 2022–2023 school year: no lessons were taught on 31 October 2022 and 2 January 2023.

- 5 September 2022: "Knowledge Day" (День знаний)
- 12 September: "Our country — Russia" (Наша страна — Россия) – Early versions of the lesson plan for children from Class 3 onwards included the teaching of expressions such as not "being scary" to die for Russia (Russian: За Родину-мать не страшно умирать).
- 19 September: "165th anniversary of the birth of Konstantin Tsiolkovsky" (165-летие со дня рождения К. Э. Циолковского)
- 26 September: "Senior Citizens' Day" (День пожилых людей) – This topic commemorates the International Day of Older Persons, which occurred on 1 October.
- 3 October: "Teacher's Day" (День учителя)
- 10 October: "Father's Day" (День отца)
- 17 October: "Music Day" (День музыки) – This topic commemorates International Music Day, which occurred on 1 October 2022.
- 24 October: "Russia — a world leader in the nuclear industry" (Россия — мировой лидер атомной отрасли) – The topic was supported by Rosatom and the Homo Science Project.
- 7 November: "National Unity Day" (День народного единства)
- 14 November: "We are different, we are together" (Мы разные, мы вместе)
- 21 November: "Mother's Day" (День матери)
- 28 November: "Symbols of Russia" (Символы России)
- 5 December: "[Civil] Volunteers of Russia" (Волонтеры России)
- 12 December: "Constitution Day" (День Конституции)
- 19 December: "Fatherland's Heroes Day" (День Героев Отечества) – This topic covers the commemorative day that occurred on 9 December 2022.
- 26 December: "New Year's Day: family holidays and dreams" (Новый год. Семейные праздники и мечты)
- 9 January 2023: "Christmas holiday" (Светлый праздник Рождества)
- 16 January: "Breaking through the siege of Leningrad" (Прорыв блокады Ленинграда)
- 23 January: "Media literacy and computer security" (Медиаграмотность и цифровая гигиена)
- 30 January: "Movement of the First" (Движение первых) – This youth organisation was created on 18 December 2022: the topic was supported by the Institute for the Study of Childhood, Family and Education of the Russian Academy of Education.
- 6 February: "Russian Science Day" (День российской науки)
- 13 February: "Russia in the world" (Россия в мире)
- 20 February: "Defender of the Fatherland Day" (День защитника Отечества)
- 27 February: "Traditional family values" (Традиционные семейные ценности)
- 6 March: "Year of Teachers and Mentors" (Год педагога и наставника)
- 13 March: "110th anniversary of the birth of Sergey Mikhalkov" (С. В. Михалков. 110 лет со дня рождения) – Sergey Mikhalkov (born on 13 March 1913 N.S.) wrote the lyrics of the national anthem of Russia.
- 20 March: "Day of the reunification of Crimea with Russia" (День воссоединения Крыма с Россией) – This topic commemorates the annexation of Crimea from Ukraine, on 18 March 2014.
- 27 March: "Theater Day: 160th anniversary of the birth of Konstantin Stanislavski" (День театра. 160 лет со дня рождения К. С. Станиславского) – This topic commemorates World Theatre Day, which occurred on 27 March 2022.
- 3 April: "Earth Day" (День земли)
- 10 April: "Cosmonautics Day: we are first!" (День космонавтики. Мы первые!) – This topic commemorates Yuri Gagarin, the first person to go to space.
- 17 April: "Day of Remembrance of the genocide of the Soviet people by the Nazis and their accomplices" (День памяти о геноциде советского народа нацистами и их пособниками)
- 24 April: "Labour Day: world of professions" (День труда. Мир профессий)
- 4 May: "Victory Day: Immortal Regiment" (День Победы. Бессмертный полк) – This topic covers the Soviet Victory Day, on 9 May.
- 15 May: "Day of Children's Public Associations" (День детских общественных объединений) – This topic also promotes the Movement of the First youth organisation.
- 22 May: "About happiness" (Про счастье)

=== 2023–2024 ===
The following topics were prescribed by the Russian Ministry of Education for the 2023–2024 school year: no lessons were taught on 6 November 2024 and 2 January 2025.

- 4 September 2023: "Knowledge Day" (Russian: День знаний)
- 11 September: "Where Russia is" (Там, где Россия)
- 18 September: "100th anniversary of the birth of Zoya Kosmodemyanskaya" (К 100-летию со дня рождения Зои Космодемьянской)
- 25 September: "Electoral system of Russia (30th anniversary of the Central Election Commission)" (Избирательная система России (30 лет ЦИК))
- 2 October: "Teacher's Day (educational advisors)" (День учителя (советники по воспитанию))
- 9 October: "About teamwork" (О взаимоотношениях в коллективе)
- 16 October: "On the other side of the screen: 115 years of Russian cinema" (По ту сторону экрана. 115 лет кино в России)
- 23 October: "Special Forces Day" (День спецназа)
- 30 October: "National Unity Day" (День народного единства) – This topic covered a public holiday that occurred on 4 November.
- 13 November: "Russia: looking into the future" (Россия: взгляд в будущее)
- 20 November: "About family relationships" (О взаимоотношениях в семье)
- 27 November: "What is the Motherland?" (Что такое Родина?)
- 4 December: "We are together" (Мы вместе)
- 11 December: "The country's constitution" (Главный закон страны) – This topic covers Constitution Day, a commemorative day that occurs on 12 December.
- 18 December: "Heroes of our time" (Герои нашего времени)
- 25 December: "New Year's family traditions of different peoples of Russia" (Новогодние семейные традиции разных народов России)
- 9 January 2024: "From A to Z: 450 years of The Alphabet by Ivan Fyodorov" (От А до Я. 450 лет "Азбуке" Ивана Фёдорова)
- 15 January: "Taxation literacy" (Налоговая грамотность)
- 22 January: "Unconquered: 80th anniversary of the liberation of Leningrad from the fascist blockade" (Непокоренные. 80 лет со дня полного освобождения Ленинграда от фашистской блокады)
- 29 January: "Allies of Russia" (Союзники России)
- 5 February: "Russian Science Day" (День российской науки)
- 12 February: "Discoverers' Day" (День первооткрывателя)
- 19 February: "Defender of the Fatherland Day" (День защитника Отечества)
- 26 February: "World Festival of Youth" (Всемирный фестиваль молодёжи)
- 4 March: "How do you find your place in society?" (Как найти свое место в обществе?)
- 11 March: "From the southern seas to the polar edge" (От южных морей до полярного края)
- 18 March: "Crimea and Sevastopol: 10 years in their home port" (Крым и Севастополь: 10 лет в родной гавани) – This topic commemorates ten years since the annexation of Crimea from Ukraine, on 18 March 2014.
- 25 March: "Unity of the peoples of Russia" (Единство народов России) – This topic was created in response to the Crocus City Hall attack. According to Russia.Post of the George Washington University on 27 March 2024, the content of the topic references attempts by the Russian government to blame Ukraine and the Western world for the attack, despite the Islamic State – Khorasan Province group claiming responsibility by providing body camera footage from one of the attackers.
- 1 April: "Russia is a healthy power" (Россия - здоровая держава) – This topic, which covers personal health, was postponed from 25 March 2024 due to the Crocus City Hall attack.
- 8 April: "I see Earth! It is so beautiful!" («Я вижу землю! Это так красиво!») – This topic commemorates Yuri Gagarin, the first person to go to space.
- 15 April: 215th anniversary of the birth of Nikolai Gogol" (215-летие со дня рождения Н.В. Гоголя)
- 22 April: "Work is cool" (Труд Крут) – This topic covers youth employment.
- 29 April: "Eco-friendly consumption" (Экологичное потребление)
- 6 May: "Victory Day" (День Победы) – This topic covers the Soviet Victory Day, on 9 May.
- 13 May: "Russian language, great and mighty: 225 years since the birth of A.S. Pushkin" (Русский язык. Великий и могучий. 225 лет со дня рождения А.С. Пушкина)
- 20 May: "Be ready! The Day of Children's Public Associations" (Будь готов! Ко дню детских общественных организаций) – This topic also promotes the Movement of the First youth organisation.

=== 2024–2025 ===
The following topics were prescribed by the Russian Ministry of Education for the 2024–2025 school year: no lessons were taught on 4 November 2024, 30 December and 6 January 2025.

- 2 September 2024: "Imagine the future: the Day of Knowledge" (Russian: Образ будущего. Ко Дню знаний)
- 9 September: "The age of information" (Век информации)
- 16 September: "Railways of Russia" (Дорогами России) – The topic was supported by Russian Railways.
- 23 September: "The path of grain" (Путь зерна)
- 30 September: "Teacher's Day" (День учителя)
- 7 October: "Legends about Russia" (Легенды о России)
- 14 October: "What does it mean to be an adult?" (Что значит быть взрослым?)
- 21 October: "How to create a strong family" (Как создать крепкую семью)
- 28 October: "Russian hospitality" (Гостеприимная Россия)
- 11 November: "Your contribution to the common cause" (Твой вклад в общее дело)
- 18 November: "Artificial intelligence and humans" (Искусственный интеллект и человек)
- 25 November: "Taking care of yourself and others" (С заботой к себе и окружающим)
- 2 December: "Mercy mission: for the Volunteer Day" (Миссия-милосердие. Ко дню волонтера)
- 9 December: "Heroes of the Fatherland Day" (День Героев Отечества)
- 16 December: "How are laws made?" (Как пишут законы?)
- 23 December: "One country, same tradition" (Одна страна - одни традиции)
- 13 January 2025: "Day of the Russian Press" (День российской печати)
- 20 January: "Student's Day" (День студента)
- 27 January: "Year of the Defender of the Fatherland" (Год защитника Отечества)
- 3 February: "Business and technological entrepreneurship" (Бизнес и технологическое предпринимательство)
- 10 February: "The Arctic – territory for development" (Арктика – территория развития)
- 17 February: "What does it mean to serve the Fatherland? 280 years since the birth of Fyodor Ushakov (part 1)" (Что значит служить Отечеству? 280 лет со дня рождения Ф. Ушакова)
- 24 February: "My small homeland" (Моя малая родина)
- 3 March: "International Women's Day" (Международный женский день)
- 10 March: "Mass sports in Russia" (Массовый спорт в России)
- 17 March: "Day of the reunification of Crimea and Sevastopol with Russia: 100th anniversary of Artek" (День воссоединения Крыма и Севастополя с Россией. 100-летие Артека) – This topic commemorates 11 years since the annexation of Crimea from Ukraine, on 18 March 2014.
- 24 March: "What does it mean to serve the Fatherland? 280 years since the birth of Fyodor Ushakov (part 2)" (Что значит служить Отечеству? 280 лет со дня рождения Ф. Ушакова)
- 31 March: "Service through creativity: why do people need art? 185 years since the birth of Pyotr Ilyich Tchaikovsky" (Служение творчеством. Зачем людям искусство? 185 лет со дня рождения П.И. Чайковского)
- 7 April: "Day of Unity of the Peoples of Russia and Belarus: the Union State" (День единения народов России и Беларуси. Союзное государство)
- 14 April: "Civil aviation of Russia" (Гражданская авиация России)
- 21 April: "Medicine of Russia" (Медицина России)
- 28 April: "What is success?" (Что такое успех?)
- 5 May: "80th anniversary of victory in the Great Patriotic War" (80-летие Победы в Великой Отечественной войне) – This topic covers the Soviet Victory Day, on 9 May.
- 12 May: "Life in motion" (Жизнь в Движении)
- 19 May: "The values that unite us" (Ценности, которые нас объединяют)

=== 2025–2026 ===
The following topics were prescribed by the Russian Ministry of Education for the 2025–2026 school year: no lessons were taught on 5 January 2026, 23 February and 11 May.

- 1 September 2025: "Why does a person need to study?" (Russian: Зачем человеку учиться?)
- 8 September: "Russian language in the digital age" (Русский язык в эпоху цифровых технологий)
- 15 September: "Creativity that unites" (Творчество, которое объединяет) – This topic was taught ahead of Intervision 2025, a Russian-backed alternative to the Eurovision Song Contest that took place in Novoivanovskoye on 20 September.
- 22 September: "Peaceful atom: Day of the Nuclear Industry Worker" (Мирный атом. День работника атомной промышленности)
- 29 September: "Digital sovereignty of the country" (Цифровой суверенитет страны) – This topic was notable for advertising Max, an app promoted by the Russian government as the "national messenger" according to RIA Novosti.
- 6 October: "What is respect? For Teacher's Day" (Что такое уважение? Ко Дню учителя)
- 13 October: "How can different generations understand each other?" (Как понять друг друга разным поколениям?)
- 20 October: "About Russian cities: for National Unity Day" (О городах России. Ко Дню народного единства)
- 27 October: "What is respect?" (Что такое уважение?)
- 1 November: "A society of unlimited possibilities" (Общество безграничных возможностей)
- 10 November: "Breeding and genetics: 170th anniversary of Ivan Michurin" (Селекция и генетика. К 170-летию И.В. Мичурина)
- 17 November: "How to resolve conflicts and cope with difficulties? For Psychologist's Day" (Как решать конфликты и справляться с трудностями? Ко Дню психолога)
- 24 November: "My profession: saving lives" (Профессия - жизнь спасать)
- 1 December: "Domestic animals" (Домашние питомцы)
- 8 December: "Russia is a country of victors: for Fatherland's Heroes Day" (Россия - страна победителей. Ко Дню Героев Отечества)
- 15 December: "Law and justice: for Constitution Day of the Russian Federation" (Закон и справедливость. Ко Дню Конституции Российской Федерации)
- 22 December: "What does conscience say?" (Что говорит совесть?)
- 29 December: "Calendar of useful activities: new year's activity" (Календарь полезных дел. Новогоднее занятие)
- 12 January 2026: "How are cartoons created?" (Как создают мультфильмы?)
- 19 January: "Museum studies: 170 years of the Tretyakov Gallery" (Музейное дело. 170 лет Третьяковской галерее)
- 26 January: "How to start your own business?" (Как создавать свой бизнес?)
- 2 February: "Does knowledge have limits? For Science Day" (Есть ли у знания границы? Ко Дню науки)
- 9 February: "Listen, hear, and negotiate: who are diplomats?" (Слушать, слышать и договариваться. Кто такие дипломаты?)
- 16 February: "The hero from next door: regional lesson for Defender of the Fatherland Day" (Герой из соседнего двора. Региональное занятие ко Дню защитника Отечества)
- 2 March: "Digital shield: basic internet safety rules" (Цифровой щит. Основные правила безопасности в сети Интернет)
- 16 March: "Factories of Russia" (Заводы России)
- 23 March: "Bolshoi: behind the scenes – 250 years of the Bolshoi Theatre and 150 years of the Union of Theatre Workers of Russia." (Большой. За кулисами. 250 лет Большому театру и 150 лет Союзу театральных деятелей России)
- 30 March/13 April: "How to cope with anxiety" (Как справляться с волнением?)
- 6/13 April: "65 years of triumph: for Cosmonautics Day." (65 лет триумфа. Ко Дню космонавтики)
- 20 April: "Earth Day: every day" (День Земли — каждый день)
- 27 April: "What does it mean to work in a team? The power of teams" (Что значит работать в команде? Сила команды)
- 4 May: "Songs about the war: for Victory Day" (Песни о войне. Ко Дню Победы)
- 18 May: "The values that unite us" (Ценности, которые нас объединяют)

=== 2026–2027 ===
The following topics were prescribed by the Russian Ministry of Education for the 2026–2027 school year:

- 1 September 2025: "Knowledge Day" (Russian: День Знаний)
- 7 September: "Feat and memory: the 85th anniversary of the Siege of Leningrad" (Подвиг и память. К 85-летию начала блокады Ленинграда, for classes 1–5 and SPO classes 2–4); "Nikolay Ivanovich Putilov" (Николай Иванович Путилов, classes 6–11 and SPO class 1)
- 14 September: "First things first, aeroplanes: the history of Russian civil aviation" (Первым делом самолёты. История гражданской авиации России, for classes 1–5 and SPO classes 2–4) – This topic was notable for promoting the Yakovlev MC-21 in the context of the Russian aviation industry; "Richard Sorge" (Рихард Зорге, classes 6–11 and SPO class 1)

== See also ==
- Education in Russia
- Movement of the First
- Mr Nobody Against Putin
- Politics in education
- Propaganda in Russia
- Scientific communism
- Young Army Cadets National Movement
- Patriotic education in China – similar policy in China
