= Public holidays in Russia =

The following is the list of official public holidays recognized by the Government of Russia. On these days, government offices, embassies, schools, companies and some shops, are closed. If the date of observance falls on a weekend, the following Monday will be a day off in lieu of the holiday.

== Major national holidays ==
=== New Year Holiday ===
In addition to New Year's Day (Новый год, Novy god) on 1 January, 2–5 January are public holidays as well, called New Year holiday (новогодние каникулы, novogodniye kanikuly). The holiday includes 6 and 8 January, with Christmas being 7 January, declared as non-working days by law. Until 2005, only 1 and 2 January were public holidays.

=== Orthodox Christmas ===
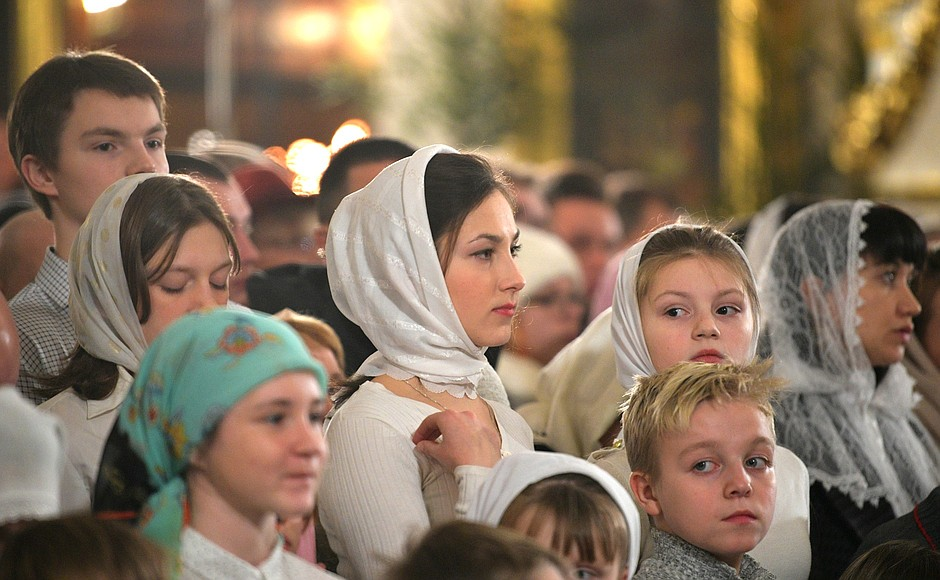
Russian Orthodox Christmas Service in St. Petersburg on 7 January 2019

Christmas in Russia (Рождество Христово, Rozhdestvo Khristovo) is celebrated on 25 December (Julian calendar) which falls on 7 January (Gregorian calendar) and commemorates the birth of Jesus Christ. The public holiday was re-established in 1991, following the decades of suppression of religion and state atheism of the Soviet Union.

=== Defender of the Fatherland Day ===
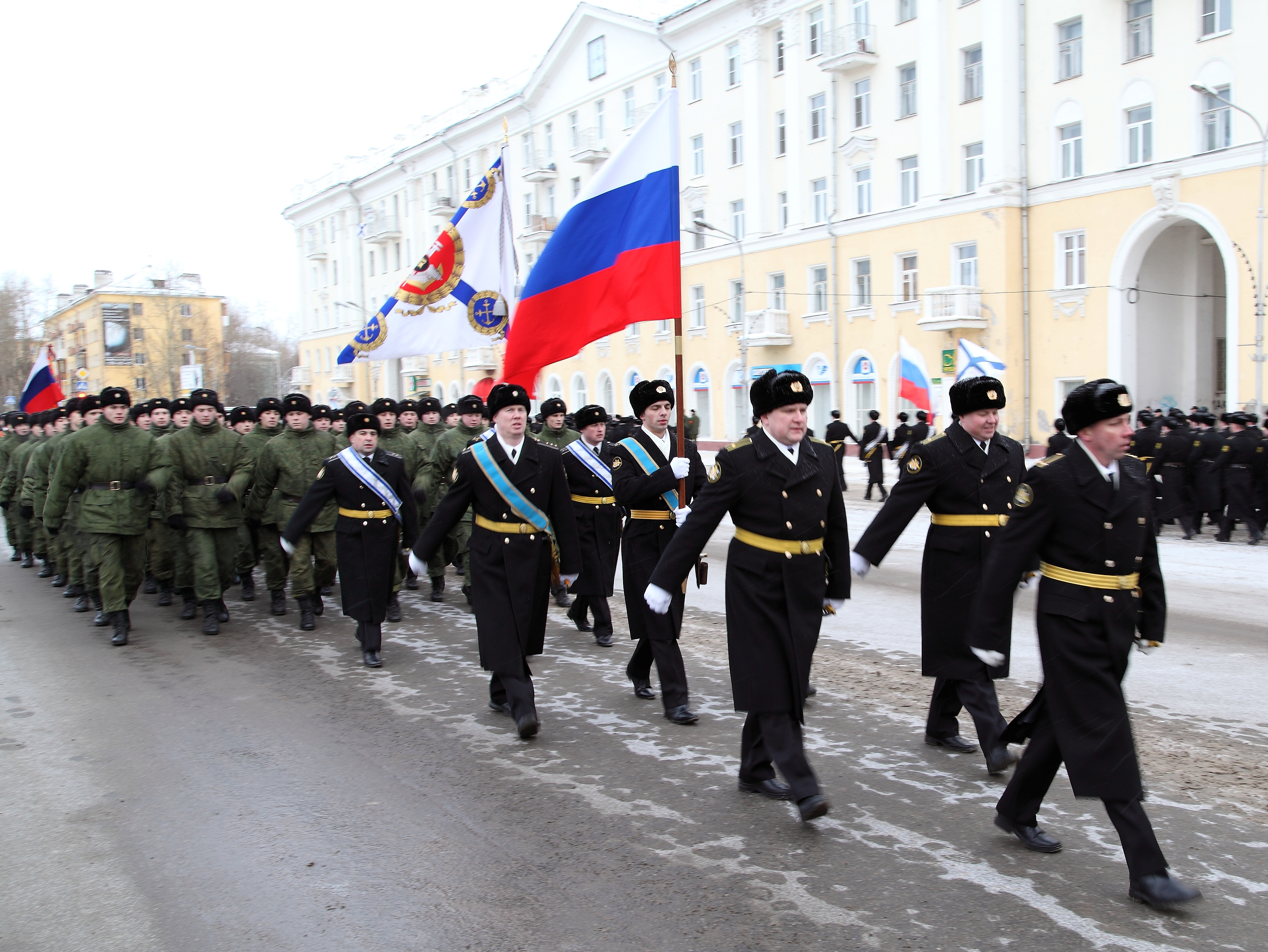
Defender of the Fatherland Day in Severodvinsk on 23 February 2012

The Defender of the Fatherland Day (День защитника Отечествa, Den zashchitnika Otechestva) is celebrated on 23 February and is dedicated to veterans and service personnel of the Russian Armed Forces, though it is often colloquially known as Men's Day (День Мужчин, Den' Muzhchin) and commonly treated as a celebration of all men.

=== International Women's Day ===
On the eve of World War I campaigning for peace, Russian women observed their first International Women's Day on the last Sunday in February 1913. In 1913 following discussions, International Women's Day was transferred to 8 March, which has remained the global date for International Women's Day ever since.

=== Spring and Labour Day ===
In the former Soviet Union, 1 May was International Workers' Day and was celebrated with huge parades in cities like Moscow. Though the celebrations are low-key nowadays, several groups march on that day to protest grievances the workers have. Since 1992, May Day is officially called "The Day of Spring and Labour".

=== Victory Day ===
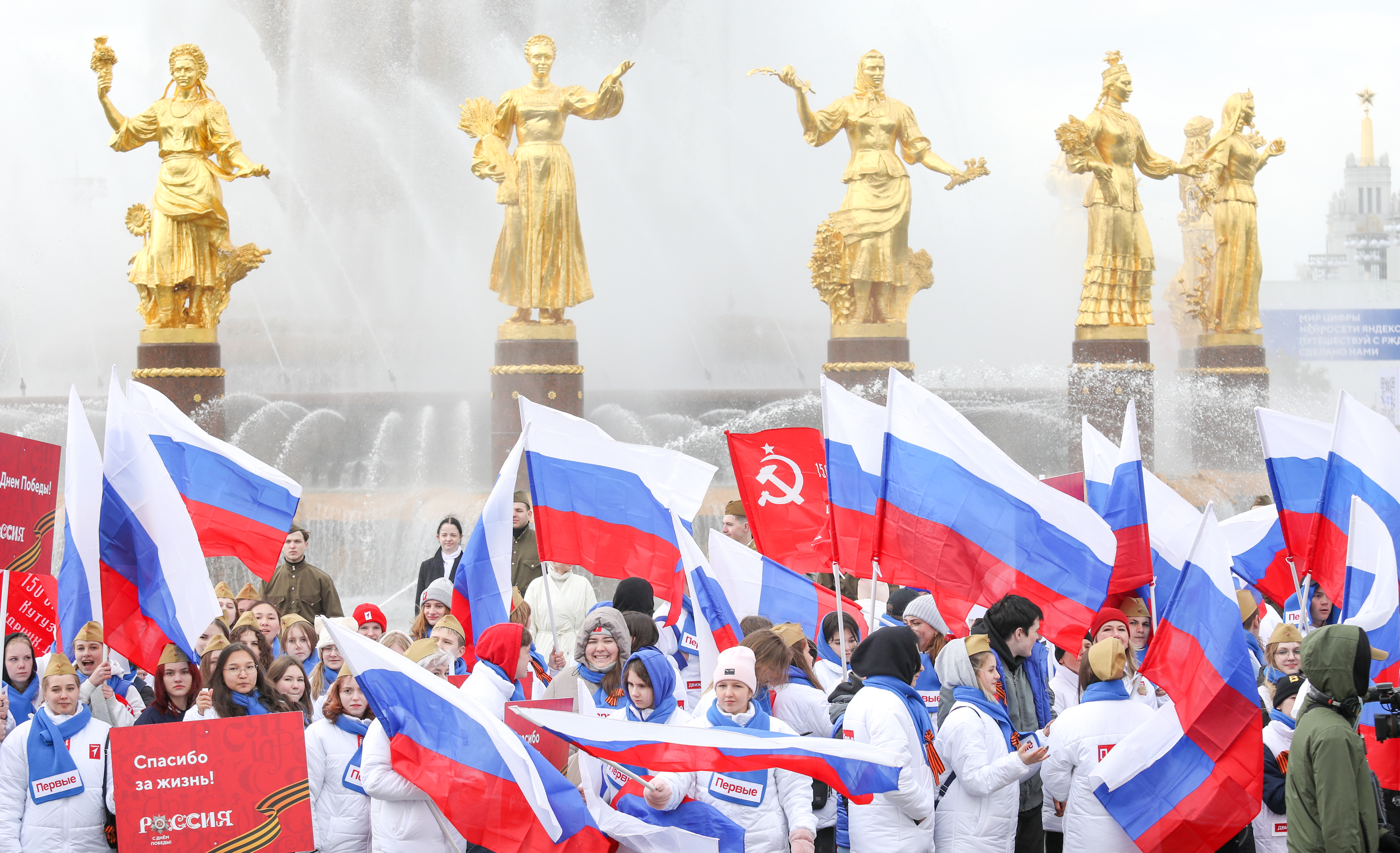
Victory Day in Moscow on 9 May 2024

On 9 May, Russia celebrates the victory over Nazi Germany, while remembering those who died in order to achieve it. On 9 May 1945 (by Moscow time) the German military surrendered to the Soviet Union and the Allies of World War II in Berlin (Karlshorst). Victory Day (День Победы, Den Pobedy) is by far one of the biggest Russian holidays. It commemorates those who died in World War II and pays tribute to survivors and veterans. Flowers and wreaths are laid on wartime graves and special parties and concerts are organized for veterans. In the evening there is a firework display. A large ground and air military parade, hosted by the President of the Russian Federation, is annually organized in Moscow on Red Square. Similar ground, air and marine (if possible) parades are organized in several other Russian cities, primarily those which are Hero Cities or have military districts or a fleet.

=== Russia Day ===
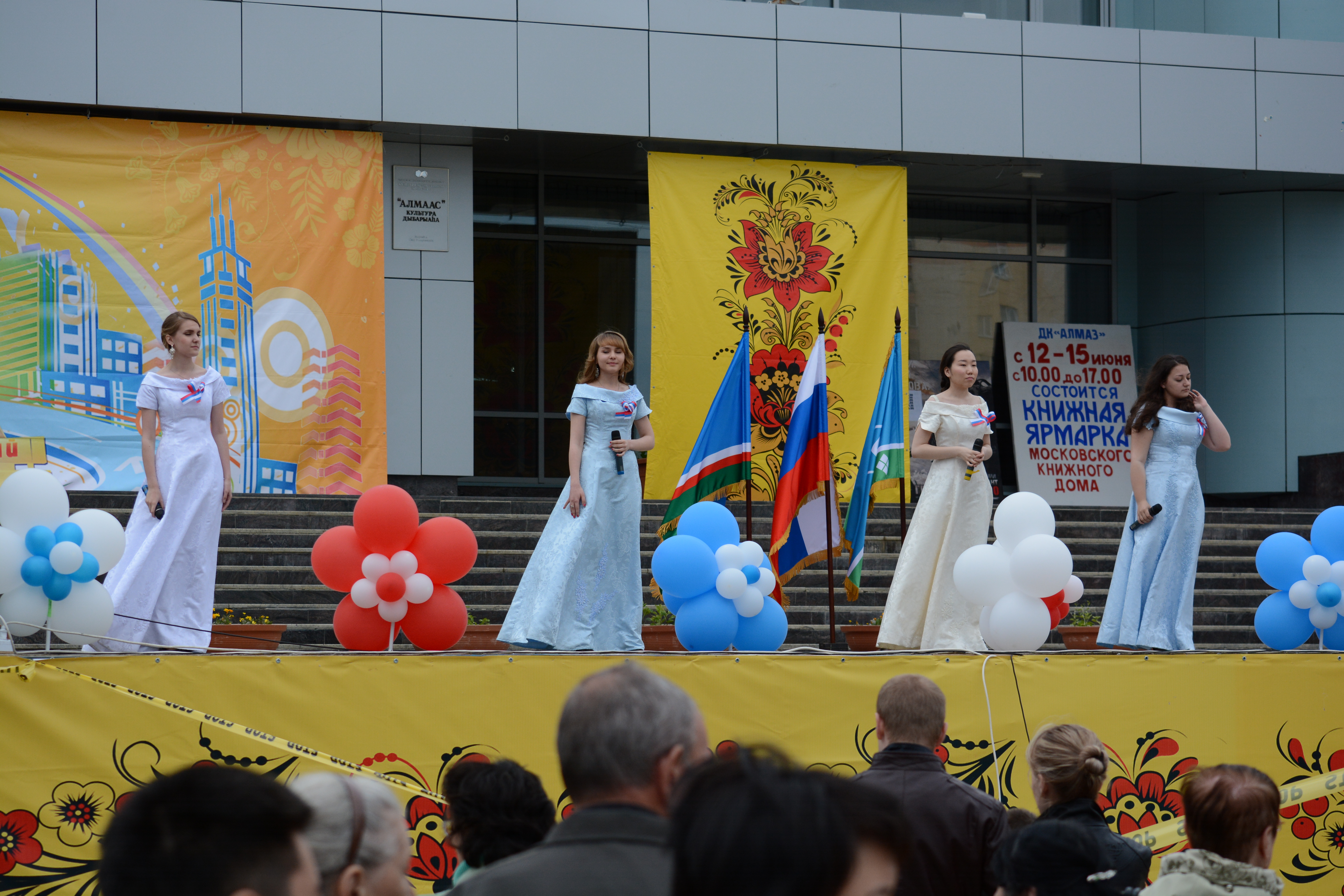
Russia Day in Mirny, Sakha Republic on 12 June 2014

Russia Day (День России, Den Rossii) is celebrated on 12 June. On this day, in 1991, the Russian parliament formally declared Russian sovereignty from the Soviet Union. The holiday was officially established in 1992.

Initially it was named Day of the Adoption of the Declaration of Sovereignty of the Russian Federation, then on 1 February 2002 it was officially renamed Russia Day (in 1998 Boris Yeltsin offered this name socially).

In Russian society there is a misconception that this holiday is also called "Russia's Independence Day", but it never has had such a name in official documents. According to a survey by Levada Center in May 2009, 44% of respondents named the holiday as "Independence Day of Russia".

=== Unity Day ===
Vladimir Putin with Russian religious leaders during Unity Day on 4 November 2015

Unity Day (День народного единства, Den narodnogo edinstva) was first celebrated on 4 November 2005, commemorating the popular uprising led by Kuzma Minin and Dmitry Pozharsky which ended the Polish occupation of Moscow in November 1612, and more generally the end of Polish intervention in Russia and the Time of Troubles. The event was marked by a public holiday which was held in Russia on 22 October (Old Style) from 1649 till 1917. Its name alludes to the idea that all the classes of Russian society willingly united to preserve Russian statehood when its demise seemed inevitable, even though there was neither a Tsar nor Patriarch to guide them. Most observers view this as a replacement for the October Revolution Day. National Unity Day is also known as Consolidation Day (as an alternative translation), which people in Russia celebrate between 3-4 November.

== List of other public holidays, commemorative and professional days ==
Date	English name	Original name	Notes
12 January	Prosecutor General's Day	День работника прокуратуры Российской Федерации	Honoring the 1772 foundation of the office of the Prosecutor General of Russia
25 January	Tatiana Day	Татьянин день	Celebrated as (University) Students' Day
15 February	International Duties Memorial Day	День памяти воинов-интернационалистов	Honoring all those who served in the 1979–1989 Soviet–Afghan War and in assisting and helping Warsaw Pact armed services during the Cold War or serving in various other military actions abroad, e.g. Vietnam
27 February	Day of Special Operations Forces	День Сил специальных операций	Honoring the active and reserve personnel, heroes and veterans of the Special Operations Forces and commemorating establishment of Russian control in Crimea in 2014
25 March	Cultural Worker Day	День работника культуры России	Honoring people involved in the cultural sector
21 April	Local Self-Government Day	День местного самоуправления	
26 April	Memorial Day for those lost in radiation accidents and catastrophes	День памяти погибших в радиационных авариях и катастрофах	Anniversary of the 1986 Chernobyl disaster
27 April	Day of Russian Parliamentarism	День российского парламентаризма	commemorates the first session of Russia's first-ever State Duma in 1906
6 June	Day of the Russian Language	День русского языка	Prior to 2011, Pushkin Day honoring Alexander Puskhin, now honors the Russian Language
8 June	Social Worker Day	День социального работника	Enacted in 2000
3rd Sunday of June	Medical Worker Day	День медицинского работника	Has been celebrated since 1988 in USSR
Last Sunday of July	Navy Day	День Военно-Морского Флота	Honoring the active and reserve personnel, heroes and veterans of the Russian Navy
29 June	Partisans and Underground Fighters Day	День партизан и подпольщиков	Holiday enacted in 2009, honoring the 1941 decree on the raising of the first units of the Soviet partisans by the Council of People's Commissariats
1st Sunday of August	Railway Workers' Day	День железнодорожника	Holiday commemorating the achievements of the railways sector
1 August	Day of Remembrance of Russian Soldiers Who Fell in World War I	День памяти российских воинов, погибших в Первой мировой войне 1914–1918 годов	Holiday enacted in 2013
6 August	Russian Railway Troops Day	День железнодорожных войск	Honoring all the active and reserve personnel, heroes, fallen and veterans of the Russian Railway Troops
12 August	Russian Air Force Day	День Военно-воздушных сил	Honoring the active and reserve personnel, heroes and veterans of the Russian Air Force
2nd Saturday of August	Sports Day	День физкультурника	Holiday commemorating the achievements of the nation's sportsmen and women, coaches, judges, sports officials and youth and disabled athletes
2nd Sunday of August	Builders' Day	День строителя	Holiday commemorating construction workers.
22 August	State Flag Day	День Государственного флага Российской Федерации	Enacted in 1994, commemorating the 1991 resolution to restore the white–blue–red tricolor as national flag by the supreme soviet of the Russian SFSR
27 August	Films and Movies Day	День российского кино	Honoring people involved in one of the world's oldest national film industries
13 September	Programmer Day	День программиста	professional day
29 September	Day of Machine-Building industry workers	День машиностроителей	professional holiday
1 October	Russian Ground Forces Day	День Сухопутных войск	Honors those serving, the heroes, fallen and veterans of the Russian Ground Forces on the day of the raising of the first units of the legendary Streltsy by Ivan the Terrible in 1550
4 October	Russian Aerospace Defense Forces Day	День космических войск	The anniversary of the 1957 launch of Sputnik that opened the way to the Space Age
23 October	Day of Advertisement industry Workers	День работников рекламы	professional holiday, enacted in 1994
24 October	Day of Special Forces of the Armed Forces	День подразделений специального назначения	Memorial, enacted in 2006, honoring the 1950 raising of the first Spetsnaz companies
25 October	Day of Customs Workers	День таможенника	Enacted in 1995
29 October	Day of MVD Security services	День вневедомственной охраны	Enacted in 1952 by government decree
30 October	Day of Remembrance of the Victims of Political Repressions	День памяти жертв политических репрессий	Enacted in 1991, honors the victims of the Imperial and Soviet era political repressions
31 October	Day of the Detention Centers and Prisons Workers	День работников СИЗО и тюрем	Enacted in 2006
10 November	Police and Internal Affairs Servicemen's Day	День сотрудника органов внутренних дел Российской Федерации	Honoring all those serving in the Police of Russia and all those working in the Ministry of Internal Affairs (Russia)
19 November	Day of the Missile Forces and Artillery	День ракетных войск и артиллерии	Enacted on 21 October 1944, to commemorate the artillery strikes and bombardment at the Battle of Stalingrad of 19 November 1942
28 November	Naval Infantry Day	День морской пехоты	Honoring the 1705 date of the raising of the first units of today's Russian Naval Infantry by orders of Peter the Great
9 December	Day of Heroes of the Fatherland	День Героев Отечества	On 25 January 2007, the day before the consideration of the bill, Boris Gryzlov, Chairman of the State Duma of the Russian Federation and Chairman of the Supreme Council of the United Russia party, explained in his interview to journalists that "We are talking about the restoration of the holiday that existed in pre-revolutionary Russia - the Day of the Cavaliers of St. George, which was celebrated on 9 December. The same date will be assigned to the Day of Heroes of the Fatherland, who deserve to have their own holiday." This memorial date was established by the State Duma of the Russian Federation on 26 January 2007, when the Russian parliamentarians adopted the relevant bill in the first reading. The explanatory note to the document stated the following: "we not only pay tribute to the memory of heroic ancestors, but also honor the living Heroes of the Soviet Union, Heroes of the Russian Federation, holders of the Order of St. George and the Order of Glory." In the same place, the authors of the bill expressed the hope that a new memorial date for Russia would contribute to "the formation in society of the ideals of selfless service to the Fatherland." On 21 February 2007, this initiative was approved by the Federation Council. On 28 February 2007, the President of the Russian Federation, Vladimir Putin, approved it.
17 December	Strategic Missile Troops Day	День Ракетных войск стратегического назначения	Enacted in 1995 to commemorate the establishment of the strategic missile forces on 17 December 1959

== Popular holidays which are not public holidays ==
- New Year according to Julian Calendar on 14 January
- Tatiana Day (Students Day) on 25 January
- Valentine's Day on 14 February
- Maslenitsa (a week before the Great Lent) Start date changes every year, depending on the beginning of the Great Lent (in 2022: 27 February to 6 March)
- Internal Troops and National Guard Servicemen's Day on 27 March
- Annunciation on 7 April
- Pascha (floating Sunday between 4 April and 8 May)
- Cosmonautics Day on 12 April
- Soviet Air Defense Forces Day on the second Sunday of April
- Russian State Fire Service Day on 30 April
- Radio Day on 7 May
- Saints Cyril and Methodius' Day on 24 May (also Slavonic Literature and Culture Day)
- Border Guards Day on 28 May, celebrating the anniversary of the Border Service of the Federal Security Service of the Russian Federation
- Ivan Kupala Day on 7 July (should be 24 June, St. John's Day and Summer Solistice, but shifted due to Julian calendar usage)
- Day of Remembrance and Sorrow on 22 June, marking the start of Operation Barbarossa — the Nazi invasion of the USSR
- Paratroopers' Day on 2 August
- Apple Feast of the Saviour on 19 August (also the Great Feast of the Transfiguration of Jesus)
- Great Feast of the Dormition of the Mother of God on 28 August
- Knowledge Day on 1 September (traditionally, the first day of school)
- Day of Tankmen on the second Sunday of September
- Father's Day on the third Sunday of October
- October Revolution Day on 7 November
- Mother's Day on the last Sunday of November
- Naval Infantry Day on 27 November
- Constitution Day on 12 December
- (Western) Christmas Day on 25 December

== See also ==
- Public holidays in the Soviet Union
- Days of Military Honour
