= Days of Military Honour =

Memorable dates in the Russian Armed Forces

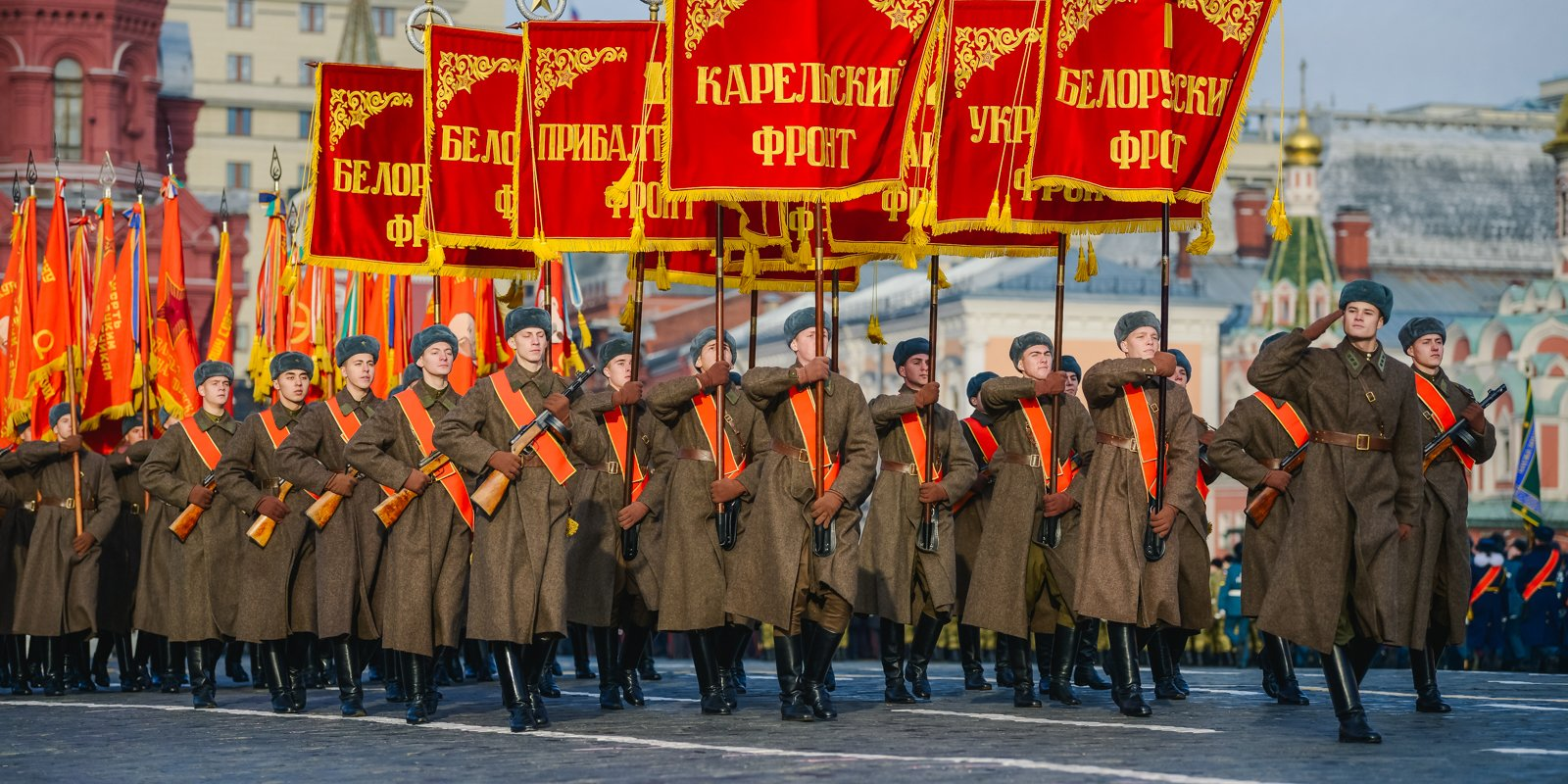
A Russian Military Honour Parade on Red Square in November 2018

The Days of Military Honour (Russian: Дни воинской славы, dni voinskoy slavy) are special memorable dates in the Russian Armed Forces dedicated to the most outstanding victories won by Russia. Some of these dates are state holidays but the majority of them are celebrated purely in the armed forces, while 7 November is marked by parades in Moscow and Samara.

The Days of Military Honour include:

- 27 January – the day of lifting of the Siege of Leningrad, 1944;
- 2 February – victory in the Battle of Stalingrad, 1943;
- 23 February – Defender of the Fatherland Day, state holiday;
- 18 April – victory over the Teutonic Knights in the Battle on the Ice, 1242;
- 9 May – Victory Day, state holiday;
- 12 May – victory in the Crimean offensive, 1944;
- 7 July – naval victory over Turkey in the Battle of Chesma, 1770;
- 10 July – victory over Sweden in the Battle of Poltava, 1709;
- 9 August – naval victory over Sweden in the Battle of Gangut, 1714;
- 23 August – victory over Germany in the Battle of Kursk, 1943;
- 3 September – the day of victory over Japan and the end of World War II, 1945;
- 8 September – the day of the Battle of Borodino with the French army, 1812;
- 11 September – naval victory over Turkey in the Battle of Tendra, 1790;
- 21 September – victory over the Golden Horde in the Battle of Kulikovo, 1380;
- 9 October – victory over Germany in the Battle of the Caucasus, 1943;
- 4 November – the day of liberation of Moscow from the Polish invaders, 1612, state holiday;
- 7 November – the day of the 1941 military parade on the Red Square in Moscow;
- 1 December – naval victory over Turkey in the Battle of Sinop, 1853;
- 5 December – the day of launching of the counter-offensive in the Battle of Moscow, 1941;
- 24 December – victory over Turkey in the Siege of Izmail, 1790.

== Commemorative dates ==
- 25 January – Tatiana Day
- 12 April – Cosmonautics Day
- 26 April – International Chernobyl Disaster Remembrance Day
- 27 April – Day of Russian Parliamentarism
- 28 July – Day of Baptism of Kievan Rus'
- 1 August – Remembrance Day of the Fallen Russian Servicemen of the First World War of 1914-1918
- 3 September – Solidarity Against Terrorism Day
- 7 November – October Revolution Day of 1917
- 3 December – Unknown Soldier's Day
- 9 December – Heroes of the Fatherland Day (in honor of the institution of the Order of St. George, in fact 7 December [O.S. 26 November] 1769)
- 12 December – Constitution Day of Russia
