= Ministry of Enlightenment =

Ministry of Enlightenment may refer to:

- Reich Ministry of Public Enlightenment and Propaganda (1933–1945), a Nazi government agency to enforce Nazi ideology
- Ministry of Education of the Russian Federation, a.k.a. Ministry of Enlightenment of the Russian Federation, established May 2018
- The Ministry of Enlightenment, a fictional agency of the Galactic Empire in the Star Wars universe, first appearing in the television series Andor
