= Public holidays in the Soviet Union =

In the Soviet Union, public holidays were set at a state level by the Supreme Soviet of the Soviet Union. More than 30 holidays were recognized in the Soviet Union.

== Official holidays ==
Date	English name	Russian name	Notes
1 January	New Year's Day	Russian: Новый год	Most of the traditions that were originally associated with Christmas in Russia, such as Father Frost and decorated fir-trees, have been moved to New Year's Day since the October Revolution, arguably making New Year's Day the largest celebration in the Soviet Union and modern Russia.
February 23	Soviet Army and Navy Day	Russian: День Советской Армии и Военно-морского флота ("Day of the Soviet Army and Navy")	First celebrated in 1919, Soviet Army and Navy Day, originally known as Red Army Day (Russian: День Красной Армии), marked 17 February 1918, the date during the Russian Civil War when the first mass draft into the Red Army occurred in Petrograd and Moscow. In January 1919, a decision was made to combine it with the celebration of the following day, on which the decree on the establishment of the Red Army was published. In 1919, 17 February fell on a Monday, so a decision was also made to move the combined holiday to the following Sunday, 23 February. That choice of day has been retained ever since. In 1923, the holiday was officially named Day of the Red Army and the Navy. In 1949, it was renamed to Soviet Army and Navy Day (Russian: День Советской армии и Военно-морского флота, romanized: Dyen' Sovyetskoy armii i Voyenno-morskogo flota). Under its current name, Defender of the Fatherland Day (Russian: День защитника отечества), the holiday was decreed a Russian state holiday in 2002 and is observed in several post-Soviet states.
8 March	International Women's Day	Russian: Международный женский день, (Восьмое марта Vosmoe marta)	International Women’s Day was a holiday marking the women's liberation movement, popularly celebrated as a cross between Mother's Day and Valentine's Day. It also marks the anniversary of the start of the February Revolution.
April 12	Cosmonautics Day	Russian: День космонавтики ("Day of Cosmonautics")	Cosmonautics Day marked the anniversary of the day Yuri Gagarin became the first human in space in 1961.
1 May	International Labor Day (May Day)	Russian: День международной солидарности трудящихся (Первое Мая) ("International Day of Worker's Solidarity (May Day)")	In modern Russia, International Labor Day is called the Celebration of Spring and Labor (Russian: Праздник весны и труда).
9 May	Victory Day	Russian: День Победы	Victory Day marked the anniversary of the 1945 capitulation of Nazi Germany, which ended the Great Patriotic War.
Third Sunday of June	Medical Worker Day	Russian: День медицинского работника	A professional holiday honoring medical staff, Medical Worker Day was a recognized holiday in the Soviet Union from 1988, when the Presidium of the Supreme Soviet modified its 1980 decree "About commemorative dates and observances".
7 October	Constitution Day	Russian: День Конституции	Constitution Day of the Soviet Union marked the anniversary of the date that the 1977 Constitution of the Soviet Union went into effect. Between 1936 and 1977, it was celebrated on December 5, after the 1936 Constitution of the Soviet Union.
7 November	October Revolution Day	Russian: Годовщина Великой Октябрьской социалистической революции or Седьмое ноября	From 1927 to 1990, October Revolution Day commemorated the anniversary of the 1917 October Revolution. Following the dissolution of the Soviet Union, it was replaced in Russia with the Day of Reconciliation and Agreement (Russian: День примирения и согласия) before amendments to the Labor Codex were adopted in December 2004, creating a new holiday, People Unity Day (Russian: День народного единства), which was moved to 4 November.

== Unofficial holidays ==
Some holidays, particularly religious holidays, were celebrated but not officially recognized in the Soviet Union.

Date	English name	Local name	Notes
7 January	Orthodox Christmas		
25 January	Tatiana Day	Татьянин день	
25 December	Catholic Christmas		
21 March	Nowruz	Новруз	Primarily celebrated in Soviet Central Asia and Soviet Transcaucasia
Date varies	Eid al-Fitr	Eid-i-Ramazon	Commemorates end of Ramadan
Date varies	Eid al-Adha	Eid-i-Kurbon	Occurs 70 days after the end of Ramadan

== See also ==
Public holidays in the Post-Soviet states

- Public holidays in Armenia
- Public holidays in Azerbaijan
- Public holidays in Belarus
- Public holidays in Estonia
- Public holidays in Georgia
- Public holidays in Kazakhstan
- Public holidays in Kyrgyzstan
- Public holidays in Latvia
- Public holidays in Lithuania
- Public holidays in Moldova
- Public holidays in Russia
- Public holidays in Tajikistan
- Public holidays in Turkmenistan
- Public holidays in Ukraine
- Public holidays in Uzbekistan
