= Scientific communism =

Ideological term used in the Soviet Union

Scientific communism (Russian: научный коммунизм, romanized: nauchny kommunizm), is one of three major elements of Marxism–Leninism. The communist literature defines it as "the science dealing with general socio-political laws and patterns, ways, forms and methods of changing society" along communist lines, according to the historical mission of the proletariat (the proletarian revolution); in other words, it is the science regarding the "working-class" struggle and the social revolution, about the supposed "laws behind the building of socialism and communism, and about the world revolutionary process as a whole". In a broader sense, "scientific communism" can mean Marxism–Leninism as a whole; the "scientific expression of the radical interests and objectives involved in the struggle of the working class". In other words, it was the Marxist–Leninist school of sociology.

The term "scientific communism" has been already used by Marx, Engels, Lenin, and other early communists; however it was used in reference to their point of view on the socialist and communist movements in the world, rather than a separate entire scientific discipline.

Mikhail Nemtsev points out that in the Soviet Union "social sciences" were seen as educational disciplines whose primary goal was forming the "correct", i.e. communist, worldview. He states that it was an instrument for indoctrination, rather than for gaining objective knowledge.

== Scientific communism as an educational discipline ==
The subject "scientific communism" as a separate discipline was introduced into the Soviet education system in 1963, following the order of the Soviet ideologist Mikhail Suslov. Paul Milton Carter in his Ph.D. thesis Suslov and Soviet Scientific Communism argued that this Suslov's move was to secure his position as "chief ideologist" and to address the growing demand on the introduction of a discipline of sociology of Marxist–Leninist type. Before that the role of Soviet sociologists was to counter the "bourgeois pseudoscience" of sociology. Scientific communism was to take over the sociological elements of the discipline of historical materialism.

Following this innovation in the education system, the department of Scientific Communism was opened by the Institute of Philosophy of the USSR Academy of Sciences.

It was taught in the USSR in all institutions of higher education and pursued in the corresponding research institutions and departments. The term was treated by authorities as encompassing the scientific socialism of Karl Marx and Friedrich Engels along with the theories of Vladimir Lenin and the CPSU. The discipline consisted in investigation of laws, patterns, ways and forms of class struggle, and socialist revolution, as well as the development of socialism and construction of communism.

=== Overview ===
Passing exams in scientific communism was a necessary prerequisite for obtaining a postgraduate degree in a science in the USSR, i.e., Candidate of Sciences. Typical courses of study included the following topics, among others:

- Origins and development of the communist theory
- Theory of socialist revolution
- International communist movement
- Dictatorship of the proletariat
- Transformation of socialism into communism
- Communist interpersonal relations and upbringing
- Criticisms of anti-communism

Other components of Marxism in the Soviet education system, following Lenin's article The Three Sources and Three Component Parts of Marxism:

- Marxist philosophy, subdivided into dialectical materialism and historical materialism
- Political economy, subdivided into the political economy of capitalism and political economy of socialism

== See also ==
- Conversations about Important Things
- Marxist sociology
- Scientific socialism
