= Day of Heroes of the Fatherland =

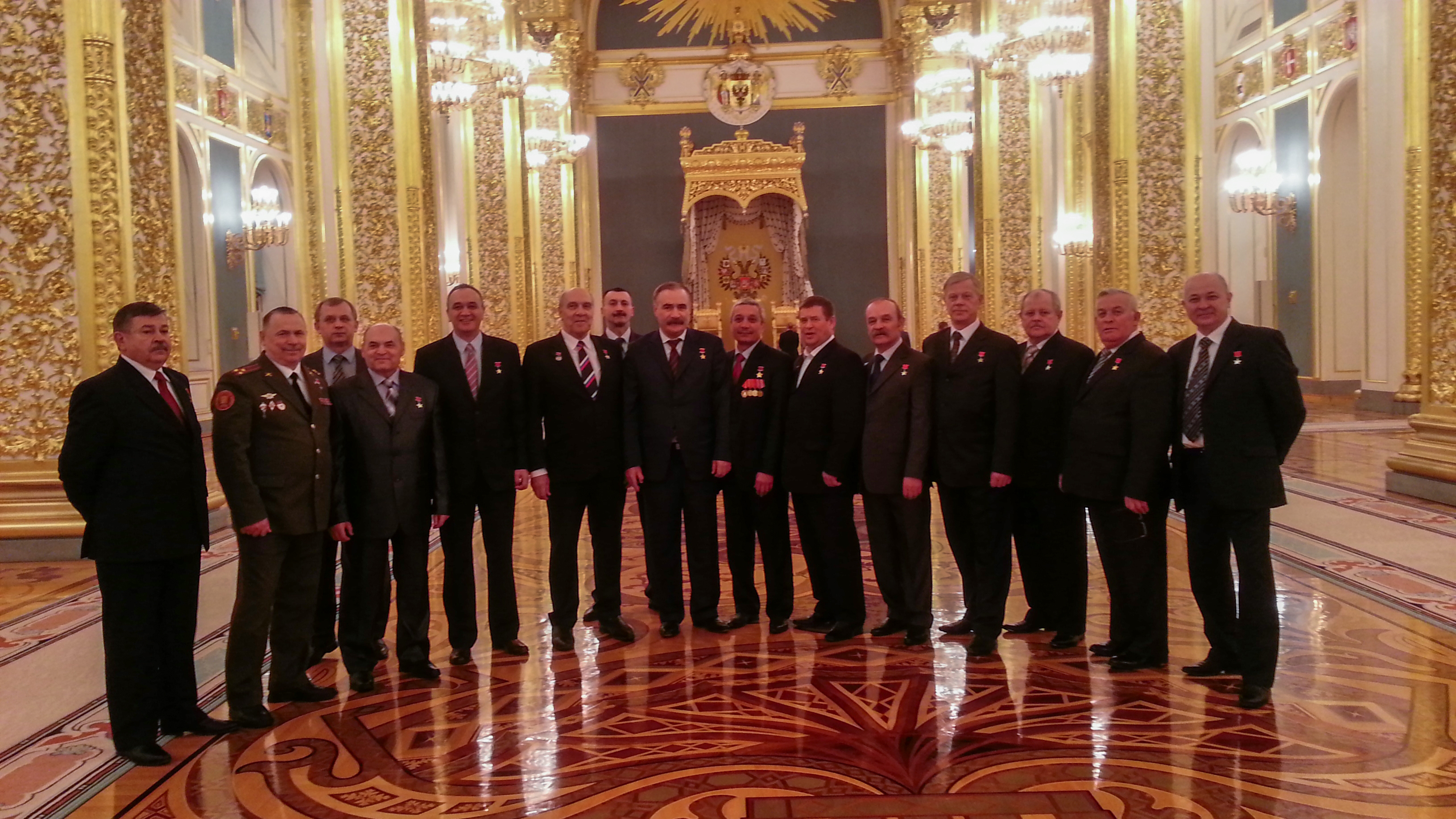
Heroes Day in The Kremlin in 2013.

The Day of Heroes of the Fatherland (Russian: День Героев Отечества) or simply just Day of Heroes is a holiday observed in Russia commemorating recipients of the title of Hero of the Russian Federation, Hero of the Soviet Union, Recipients of the Order of Saint George and the Order of Glory.

== History ==
On 25 January 2007, Boris Gryzlov, Chairman of the State Duma explained in an interview that it was designed to be the successor of a holiday that existed in the Russian Empire, the Day of the Cavaliers of St. George, which was celebrated on 9 December. This memorial date was established by the State Duma of the Russian Federation the next day, when the Russian parliamentarians adopted the relevant bill in the first reading. On 21 February 2007, this initiative was approved by the Federation Council and on 28 February, President Vladimir Putin, approved it.

== See also ==
- Border Guards Day
- Police and Internal Affairs Servicemen's Day
- Defender of the Fatherland Day
