= Paratroopers' Day =

Memorable sate in Russia, Belarus and other CIS countries

Airborne Forces Day
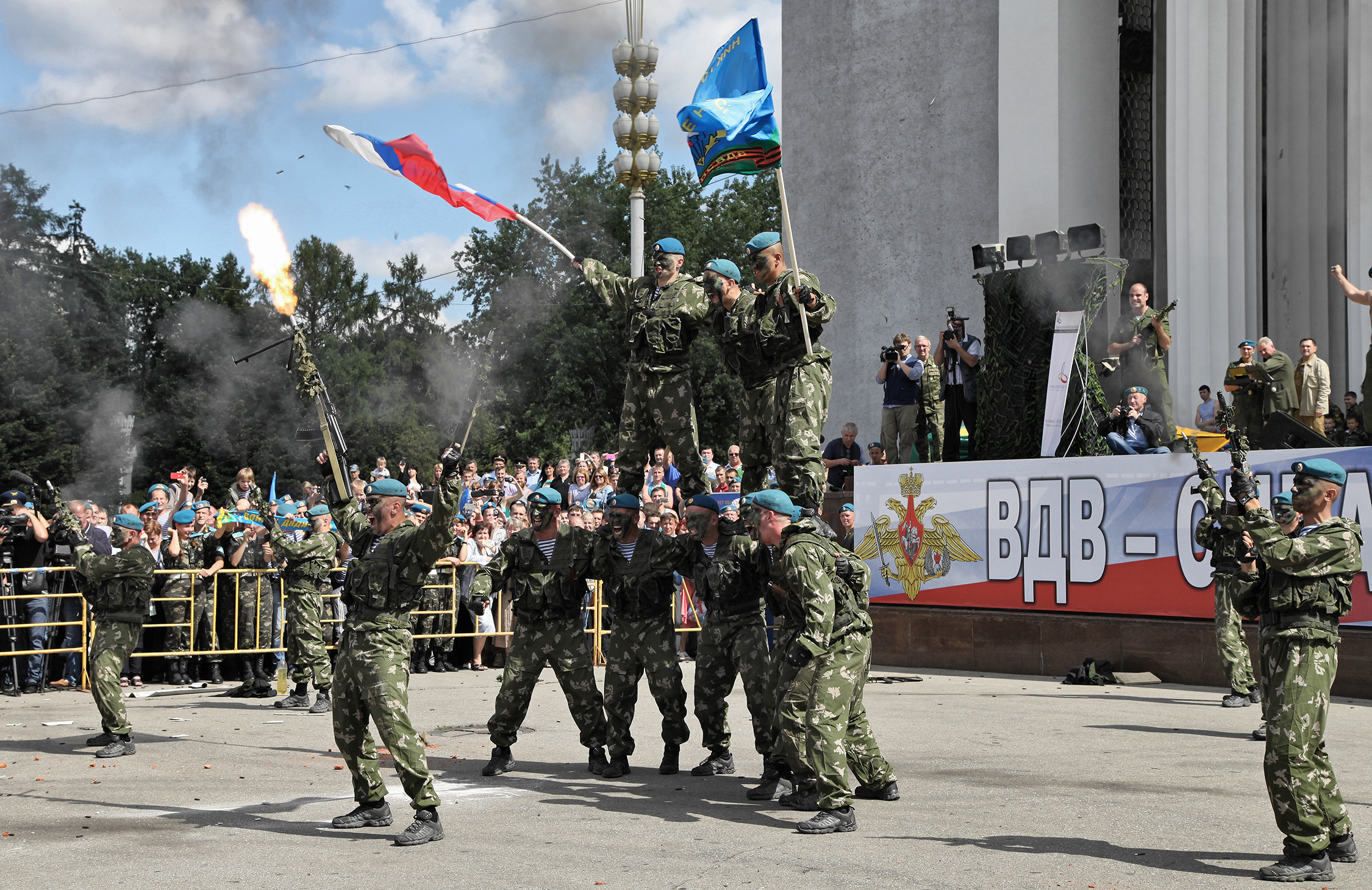
- A demonstration at the Exhibition of Achievements of National Economy
- Also called: Paratroopers' Day
- Observed by: Belarus; Kazakhstan; Russia; Soviet Union (historically); Ukraine (1999–2017)
- Type: State
- Significance: Professional working day
- Celebrations: Military ceremonies and events
- Date: 2 August
- Next time: 2 August 2026
- Frequency: annual

Airborne Forces Day (Note: Russian: День Воздушно-десантных войск, romanized: Den Vozdushno-desantnykh voysk) also known as Paratroopers' Day (Note: Russian: День десантника, romanized: Den desantnika) is a professional military holiday observed in Russia, Belarus and Kazakhstan, celebrated on 2 August annually. It was formerly celebrated in the Soviet Union until its collapse in 1991. It was celebrated in Ukraine as Airmobile Forces Day (Note: Ukrainian: День високомобільних десантних військ, romanized: Den vysokomobilnykh desantnykh viisk) from 1999 until 2017. It is the official holiday of the former Soviet Airborne Forces and the modern Russian Airborne Forces.

== History ==
The birthday of the Airborne Forces is considered to be 2 August 1930. On this day at military exercises of the Moscow Military District, a 12 member paratrooper unit was parachuted for performing a tactical task. Airborne Forces Day is currently celebrated on 2 August, on the basis of the Decree of the President of the Russian Federation dated May 31, 2006 “On the Establishment of Professional Holidays and Memorable Days in the Armed Forces of the Russian Federation".

In Ukraine, from 1999 to 2017 Airmobile Forces Day was celebrated on 2 August. From 2017 Ukraine’s Airmobile Forces were renamed Air Assault Forces, their traditions revised, and a new Air Assault Forces Day declared 21 November, which is the day of the patron of the paratroopers, Archangel Michael. According to President Petro Poroshenko this move was "Ukrainianization of the historical and political calendar - to replace the Soviet-Russian imposed on us."

== Celebrations ==
Airborne Forces Day, which is a professional holiday for active and reserve airborne troops, is traditionally celebrated throughout Russia, Belarus and other countries. During the holiday, many cities traditionally held demonstrations of paratroopers, concerts, charity events, festivals, crafts fairs and souvenirs exhibition and sale.

=== Common meeting places ===
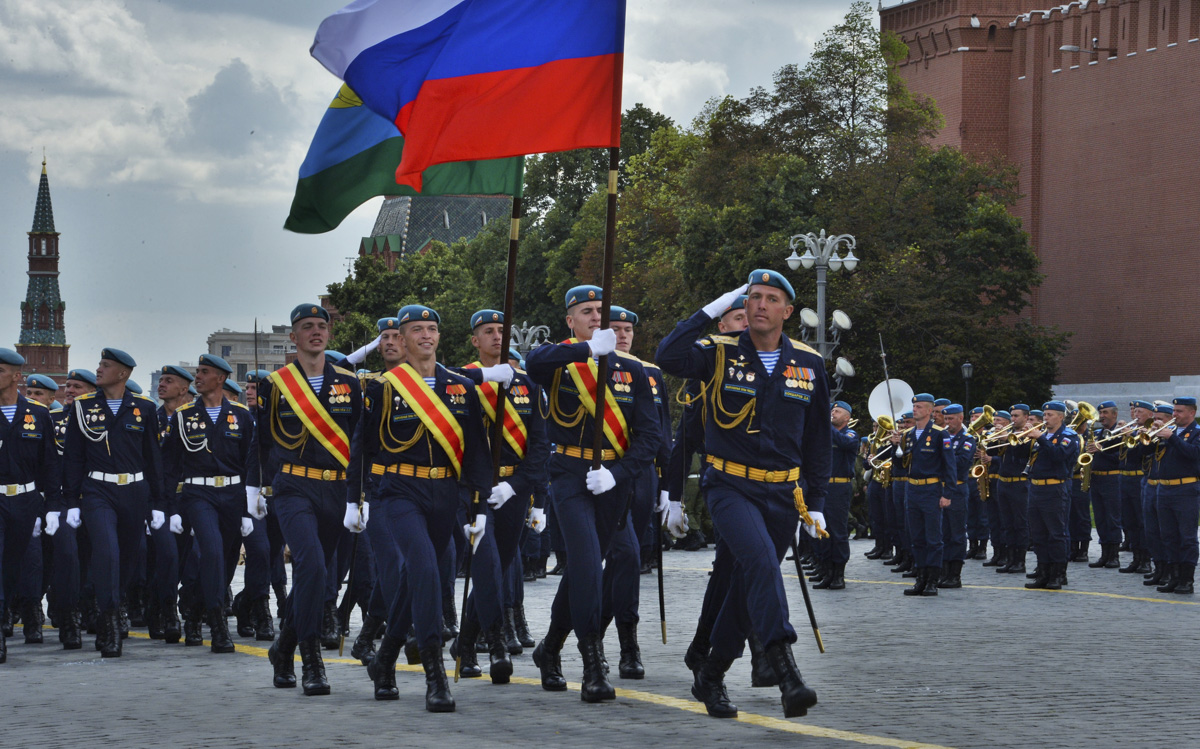
Troops of the VDV during the 90th anniversary parade in Moscow.

- In Almaty, veterans are found in the Central Park of Culture and Rest named after Gorky.
- In Donetsk, veterans are found in the Shcherbakov Park and near the monument to the fallen Afghan warriors.
- In Kyiv, the meeting places of veterans included the National Museum of the History of Ukraine in the Second World War, a monument to soldiers-internationalists, and less often, Maidan Nezalezhnosti. The Ukrainian Air Assault Forces now celebrates its own holiday on 21 November.
- In Moscow, the traditional places for annual meetings of the Blue Berets are Gorky Central Park of Culture and Leisure and Poklonnaya Gora. The capital's first ever Paratroopers Day parade was held in 2018 on the southern part of Red Square near Saint Basil's Cathedral and the Monument to Minin and Pozharsky marking 88 years of the Airborne Forces.
- In St. Petersburg, traditional meeting places include Krestovsky Island and Palace Square.
- In Vitebsk, paratroopers meet on Victory Square.

== Controversies ==
Prominent tradition involves paratroopers swimming in public fountains, a practice that has led some cities to drain fountains to prevent drownings and property damage.

Excessive public drinking often accompanies these celebrations, contributing to rowdy behavior and brawls, sometimes involving violence against civilians or clashes with police, as seen in incidents like the 2017 Moscow brawl during an NTV live broadcast.

== See also ==
- Police and Internal Affairs Servicemen's Day
- Border Guards Day
- Navy Day
- Defender of the Fatherland Day
- Paratroopers' Day (Tajikistan)
