= Sergey Kravtsov (politician) =

Russian politician

- Сергей Кравцов
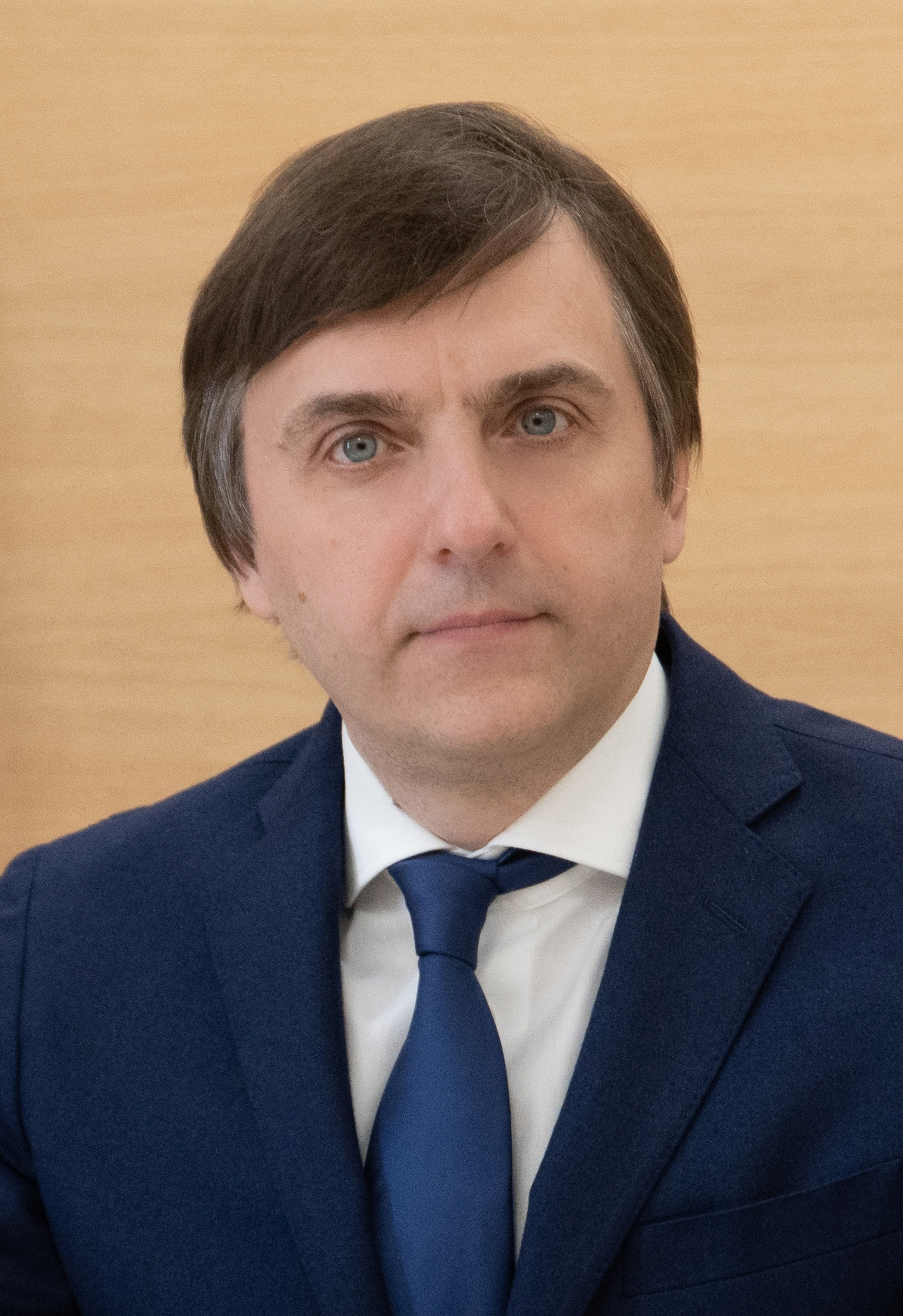
- Kravtsov in 2025

Minister of Education
- Incumbent
- Assumed office 21 January 2020
- Prime Minister: Mikhail Mishustin
- Preceded by: Olga Vasilieva

Personal details
- Born: 17 March 1974 (age 52) Moscow, Soviet Union
- Education: Sholokhov Moscow State University for Humanities; Moscow State Pedagogical University
- Profession: Educator

Sergey Sergeyevich Kravtsov (Russian: Сергей Сергеевич Кравцов; born 17 March 1974) is a Russian politician and educator who has served as the Minister of Education of the Russian Federation since 21 January 2020.

Doctor of Education (2007), Associate Professor. Acting State Advisor to the Russian Federation, Grade 3 (2013). Head of the Federal Service for Supervision in Education and Science (Rosobrnadzor) from 8 August 2013 to 21 January 2020.

== Biography ==
He was born on 17 March 1974 in Moscow.

In 1996, he graduated with honors from Moscow State Open Pedagogical University (since 2006 - Sholokhov Moscow State University for Humanities, in 2015 he joined the Moscow State Pedagogical University) with a degree in "teacher of mathematics and computer science". From 1994 to 1996, he worked as a mathematics teacher at School No.176 in Moscow.

From 1997 to 2002, he worked at the Institute of Education Management of the Russian Academy of Education, held the positions of Junior Researcher, Researcher, Senior Researcher, and Laboratory Head. In 1999 he defended his thesis "Methodology for conducting classes with lagging students in mathematics using multimedia technology." In 2000, he graduated from the Moscow State Institute of International Relations with a degree in state and municipal government with knowledge of a foreign language.

In 2002, he began working at the Ministry of Education of the Russian Federation. From 2004 to 2008, he was an assistant to the head of the Federal Service for Supervision in Education and Science Viktor Bolotov.

In 2007, he defended his thesis for the degree of Doctor of Pedagogical Sciences on the topic "Theory and practice of organizing specialized training in schools of the Russian Federation" at the Institute of Content and Methods of Education of the Russian Academy of Education (official opponents A. V. Barannikov, V. I Blinov and V. S. Danyushenkov; according to the Dissernet community, the dissertation contains large-scale borrowings that are not framed as citations, including from unauthorized sources).

In 2008, he was appointed Director of the Federal State Institution "Federal Testing Center", which was developing the procedure for conducting the Unified State Exam. In 2009, he headed the Institute of Education Management of the Russian Academy of Education.

In April 2011, he was appointed Director of the Regional Development Department of the Ministry of Education and Science of the Russian Federation; also in 2011, he acted as the rector of the federal state institution "Academy for Advanced Studies and Professional Retraining of Education Workers". In July 2012, he was appointed Director of the Department of Program Management and Competition Procedures of the Ministry of Education and Science.

In December 2021 he was awarded the Fiddler on the Roof Award in the Statesperson category.

On 8 August 2013, by order of the Government of the Russian Federation, he was appointed to the post of head of the Federal Service for Supervision of Education and Science, replacing Ivan Muravyov at this post. From 28 October 2017 to 24 May 2018 he served as Deputy Minister of Education and Science of the Russian Federation and head of Rosobrnadzor, since the department was subordinate to the Ministry of Education and Science. In 2018, the Federal Service for Supervision of Education and Science was reassigned to the Government. On 24 May 2018 Kravtsov was again appointed its head.

On 21 January 2020, by presidential decree he was appointed to the post of Minister of Education of the Russian Federation in Mikhail Mishustin's Cabinet.

In June 2022, Ukraine imposed personal sanctions on Kravtsov as a member of the Russian government due to the Russian invasion of Ukraine.

In July 2023, Kravtsov was sanctioned by the United Kingdom as a result of his role in "Russia's calculated programme of deportation" of Ukrainian children.

Following the Russian invasion of Ukraine, the Russian government increased their efforts to introduce "patriotic education" into schools. Kravtsov is one of the architects of the Important Conversations lessons, which cover various topics from the Russian government's perspective, such as national identity, patriotism, traditional values and world events. The Associated Press reported that some parents were shocked by the militaristic nature of Important Conversations lessons, with some comparing them to the "patriotic education" of the former Soviet Union.

== Family ==
Kravtsov's parents, Alla Kravtsova and Sergey Braun, own a number of apartments in the Czech Republic.
