= Police and Internal Affairs Servicemen's Day =

Public holiday in Russia

Police and Internal Affairs Servicemen's Day Russian: День сотрудника органов внутренних дел Российской Федерации
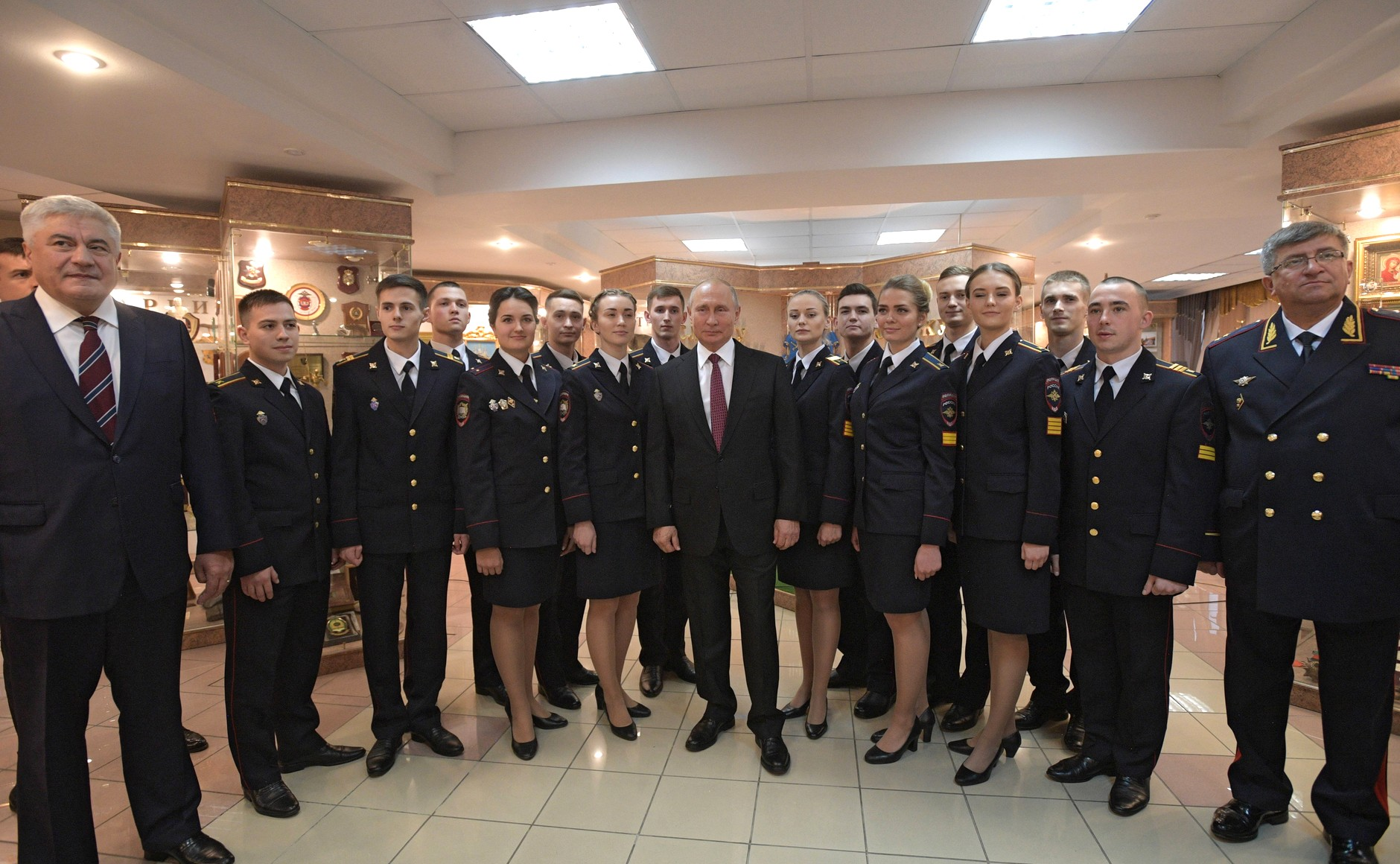
- President Vladimir Putin with cadets of the Moscow University of the Ministry of Internal Affairs during a visit on Police Day in 2018.
- Observed by: Russia (under the name of Police and Internal Affairs Servicemen's Day); Belarus (celebrated as Police Day); Kyrgyzstan (celebrated as Police Day); Kazakhstan (celebrated as Police Day); Moldova (celebrated as Police Day); Tajikistan (celebrated as Police Day); Uzbekistan (celebrated under the Russian name); Ukraine (celebrated as National Police Day)
- Significance: Celebrates the founding of the national police/acts as the professional holiday for police officers
- Observances: Wreath laying ceremonies, concerts, parades
- Date: November 10
- Frequency: annual

Police and Internal Affairs Servicemen's Day (Russian: День сотрудника органов внутренних дел, romanized: Den' sotrudnika organov vnutrennikh del), commonly known outside Russia as the Day of the Police (Russian: День полиции, romanized: Den' politsii; Kazakh: Полиция күні, romanized: Politsiia künı; Tajik: Рӯзи милитсия, romanized: Rūzi militsija; Kyrgyz: ИИМ күнү; Belarusian: Дзень паліцыі, romanized: Dzień palicyi; Ukrainian: День поліції, romanized: Den politsii; Romanian: Ziua de poliție, Uzbek: Politsiya kuni) is a public holiday celebrated in Russia and most post-Soviet republics which honors all those serving in their national police. Russia, the most notable country to celebrate the holiday, was a pioneer in this celebration, using the occasion to honor the Police of Russia.

== History ==
O 10 November (28 October, O.S.) 1917, Alexei Rykov, the then People's Commissar for Internal Affairs on the first roster of the Sovnarkom, signed a decree on the establishment of a working Soviet Militsiya. Since 1962, this date has been is celebrated as a professional holiday, after a decree signed by the Chairman of the Presidium of the Supreme Soviet of the USSR Leonid Brezhnev cane into effect on 26 September of that year. Beginning on 1 October 1980, the Day of Soviet Militia was considered an official holiday, in accordance with the Decree No. 3018 of the Supreme Soviet, which was amended by on 1 November 1988 to specifically make it a holiday specific to the RSFSR.

== Russian celebrations ==
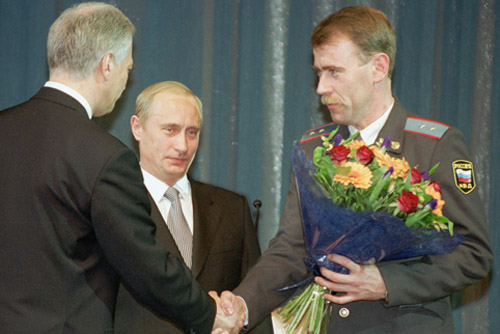
President Vladimir Putin awarding the Order of Courage on Police Day in 2001.

In Russia, Police Day honors the policemen of the Police of Russia and all those working in the Ministry of Internal Affairs. The holiday was also celebrated under the previous Russian Militsiya. Since the adoption of Dmitry Medvedev's Russian police reform in March 2011, the holiday's name was changed from simply the Day of the Militsiya to Police and Internal Affairs Servicemen's Day. Since 2000, the President of Russia usually gives a keynote address during a gala event at the State Kremlin Palace. Visits to the Kikot Moscow University of the MVD are commonplace for government officials.

== Police days and commemorations in post-Soviet countries ==
Police and Internal Affairs Servicemen's Day is primarily celebrated in the Russian Federation, although a number of former Soviet republics celebrate this holiday on various dates, usually under the name of Day of the Police or Day of the Militsiya.

=== Armenia ===
Police Day in Armenia is celebrated as the Police Workers Day (Armenian: Ոստիկանության օր), honoring the personnel of the Police of Armenia. It is celebrated annually on 16 April and has been since 2002. The date for the holiday was chosen exactly a year earlier, on 16 April 2001, by the National Assembly of Armenia. It was on this day in 2011 that the Law "On Police Duties" was passed. Traditionally, the President of Armenia and/or the Prime Minister of Armenia receives the salute at the police headquarters in Yerevan during a ceremony in which a drill team and police band perform. Early in the morning, high-ranking representatives of the Armenian police lay flowers at the Monument to the Unknown Soldier in Victory Park. Mass events have also occasionally been held in Vazgen Sargsyan Republican Stadium.

=== Azerbaijan ===
The Day of the Police of Azerbaijan is the professional holiday of law enforcement officers of the Republic, celebrated annually on July 2. The date honors the signing of "personnel appointments to the police" by the Minister of the Interior of the Azerbaijan Democratic Republic on this day in 1918. This came weeks after the establishment of the republic, a date which is now Azerbaijan's Republic Day. It became an official holiday on 28 October 1999 by order of President Heydar Aliyev.

=== Belarus ===
Since March 1998, the Day of the Police of Belarus (Дзень паліцыі Беларусі), celebrated on 4 March, honours the Belarusian Militsiya and the date in 1917 when Bolshevik politician and icon Mikhail Frunze was appointed the chief of the militia of the city of Minsk. It is celebrated widely among agencies of the Belarusian MVD and is celebrated by the various special police units such as OMON and SOBR and the Presidential Guard. The Internal Troops of Belarus celebrated its professional holiday on 18 March.

=== Kazakhstan ===
The Police and Civil Servant's Day in Kazakhstan is celebrated on 23 June. It was officially declared by President Nursultan Nazarbayev in 2007. The Civil Servant's Day was incorporated into the holiday in 2013.

=== Kyrgyzstan ===
The Day of the Police of Kyrgyzstan is marked by the Ministry of the Interior on 1 November, commemorating the establishment of the first unified Kyrgyz police in the Kara-Kirghiz Autonomous Oblast in 1924. President Askar Akayev ordered the establishment of the holiday on 17 September 1993. A parade and exhibit of the police takes place on Bishkek's Old Square in front of the House of Government.

=== Moldova ===
The Moldovan General Police Inspectorate celebrates Police Day (Romanian: Ziua Poliţiei) on 18 December.

=== Tajikistan ===
6 February is celebrated in Tajikistan as the Day of Police (Tajik: Рӯзи милитсия). It honors the arrival of the first NKVD officers in Dushanbe, the then capital of the Tajik Autonomous Soviet Socialist Republic. The holiday has been celebrated in an official capacity since 2011, having been celebrated off and on beginning in 1994. Prior to 1991, the day was called the Day of the Soviet Militia. Police officers killed in the Tajik Civil War are honoured on this date. To date, more than one thousand family policemen have been provided with households on the holiday.

=== Ukraine ===
Ukraine celebrates National Police Day (Ukrainian: День Національної поліції) on 4 July. It commemorates the suspension of law enforcement duties by the Ukrainian Militsiya and the establishment of the National Police of Ukraine. It also coincides with the first oath of patrol policemen on Sofia Square in Kyiv. The holiday was introduced and first celebrated on 4 August 2015 and was celebrated on that day ever since until President Petro Poroshenko by decree on 4 April 2018 declared that National Police Day be celebrated annually on 4 July, and become a national holiday.

=== Uzbekistan ===
The Internal Affairs Servicemen's Day (Uzbek: Ichki ishlar xodimlari kuni) is celebrated in Uzbekistan on 25 October.

== See also ==
- Defender of the Fatherland Day
- Border Guards Day
- Navy Day
- Paratroopers' Day
- Law enforcement in Russia
- Public holidays in Russia
