= Knowledge Day =

First day of school in many former Eastern Bloc states

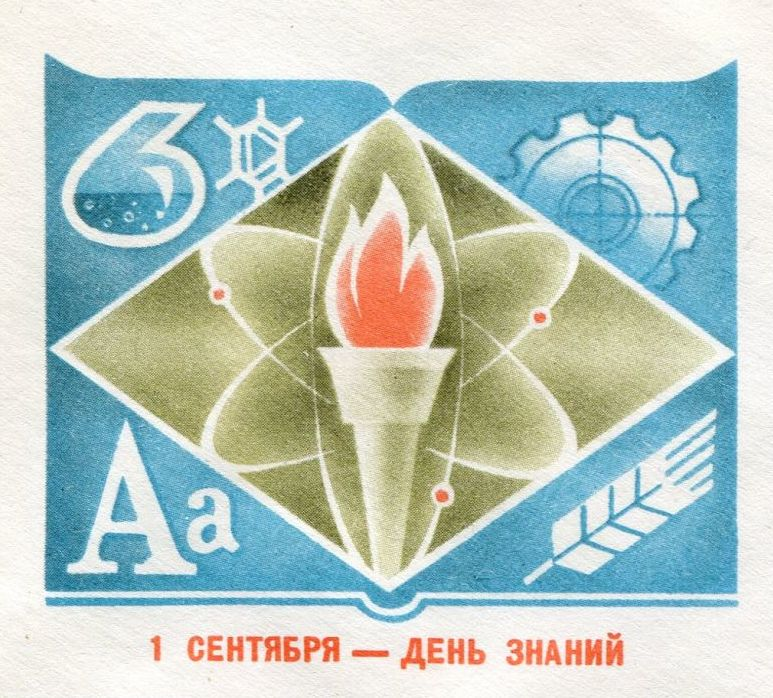
Logo from a stamped envelope issued for Knowledge Day in the USSR in 1986

Knowledge Day (Russian: День знаний, romanized: Den' znaniy), often simply called 1 September, is the day when the school year traditionally starts in Russia and many other former Soviet republics as well as other countries in the former Eastern Bloc (excluding Romania, where it falls on 11 September; the former East Germany, where it varies in a coordinated fashion; and Azerbaijan and Bulgaria, where it falls on 15 September) and Israel.

== Description ==
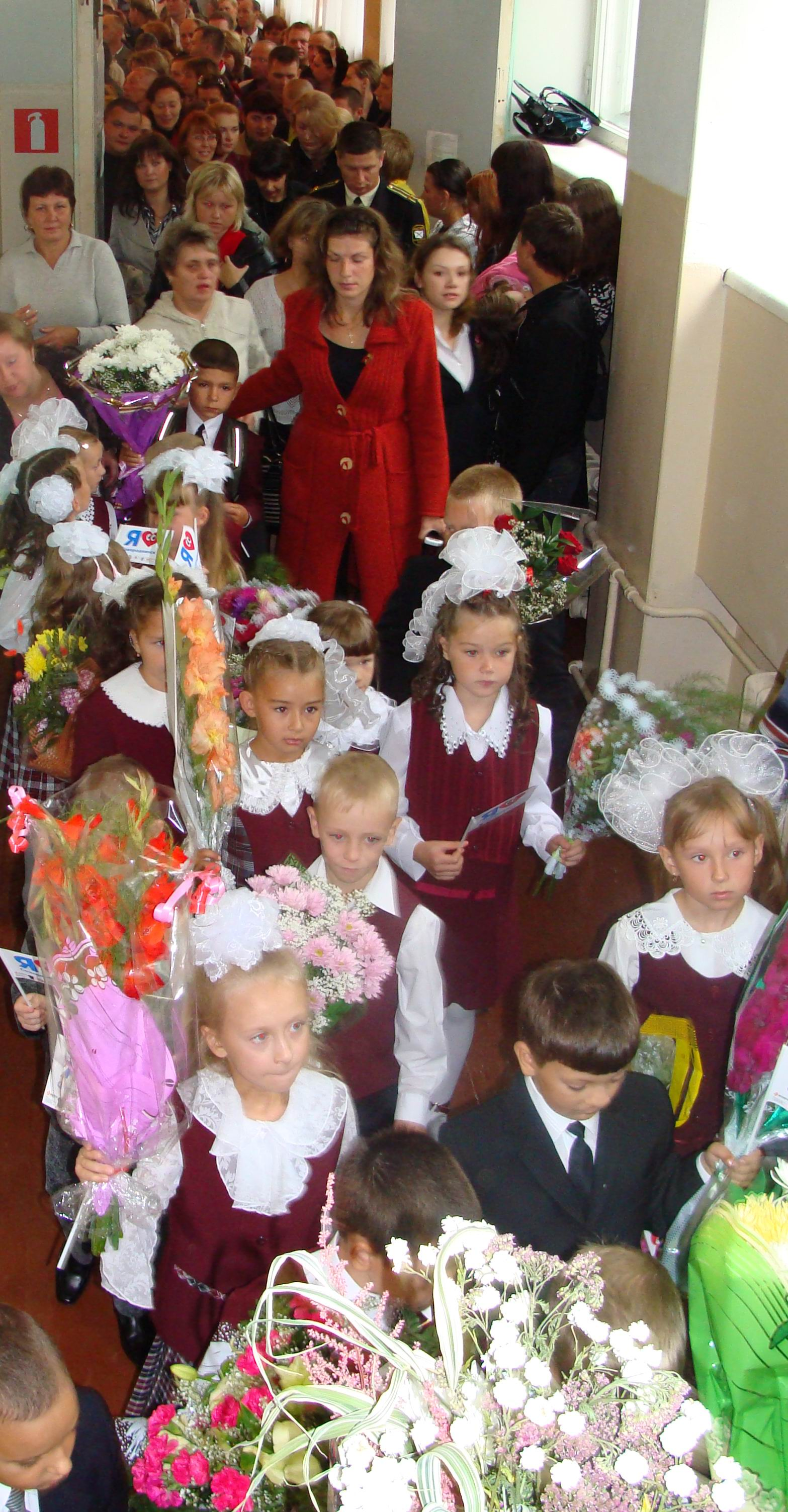
A typical Knowledge Day in Russia

Knowledge Day originated in the USSR, where it had been established by the Decree of the Presidium of the Supreme Soviet of the USSR of 15 June 1984. An important role in the approval of the new holiday date was played by the honored school teacher, director of the Krasnodar school, Bryukhovetsky Fedor Fedorovich. This day also marks the end of summer and the beginning of autumn according to the meteorological definition commonly used in Russia. It has special significance for the incoming class of first graders who come to school for the first time and often participate in a celebratory assembly on this date. The day also involves the First Bell (Первый Звонок). Students in other grades may begin studies on 1 September or a few days later, usually without any special festivities.

In Israel, Knowledge Day is observed on 1 September. Due to immigration of the former Soviet families to Israel, it is observed as such.

== Significant events ==
=== Beslan school siege ===
On Knowledge Day (1 September) 2004, the occupants of School Number One in the Russian town of Beslan were taken hostage by armed Chechen terrorist group Riyadus-Salikhin. The Beslan school siege lasted three days and ended catastrophically when Russian security services stormed the building, resulting in the death of 334 hostages, 186 of them children. The mishandling of the siege by the Russian authorities resulted in significant political implications for the Russian state.

== See also ==
- Education in Russia
- Public holidays in Russia
