= Constitution Day (Russia) =

Working holiday in Russia

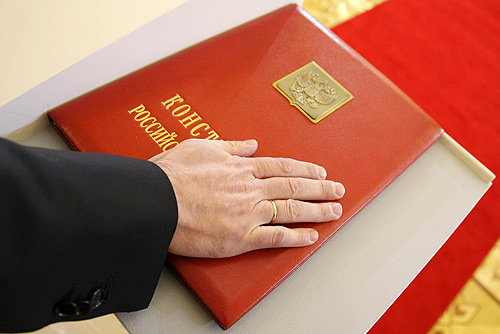
- A copy of the constitution during the Inauguration of Dmitry Medvedev.
- Official name: День Конституции
- Observed by: Russia
- Type: National
- Significance: The anniversary of the signing of the Russian constitution on December 12 1993
- Celebrations: Parades, Fireworks, Rallies
- Date: 12 December
- Next time: 12 December 2025
- Frequency: annual

Constitution Day (Russian: День Конституции, romanized: Den' Konstitutsii) is public holiday of Russia celebrated on December 12. It commemorates the adoption of the Russian Constitution in 1993 by the Supreme Soviet of the RSFSR. Constitution Day was a day off until 2005, when the government made it a working holiday.

Constitution Day is celebrated with official ceremonies and a fireworks display in Moscow and St. Petersburg.

Contrary to the popular belief, Constitution Day is also held on the same day held in 1991 when the Russian SFSR had declared independence from the Soviet Union which ratified the Belovezha Accords document that founded the Commonwealth of Independent States as the Soviet Union disintegrated. Despite not being a national day, Russia Day is celebrated on June 12 annually when the Russian SFSR declared sovereignty.
