= Ministry of Education (Russia) =

Government ministry of Russia

Ministry of Education of the Russian Federation
- Министерство просвещения Российской Федерации; Ministerstvo prosveshcheniya Rossiiskoi Federatsii
- Ministry emblem

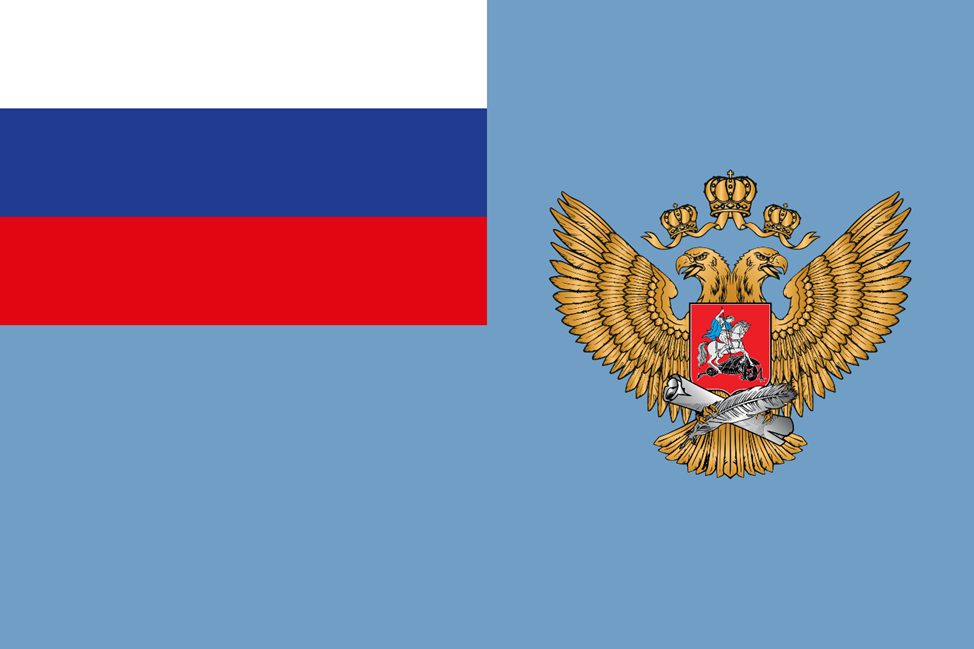
- Ministry flag

Agency overview
- Formed: 17 May 2018
- Jurisdiction: Government of Russia
- Headquarters: Karetny Ryad 2, Moscow; 55°46′14.59″N 37°36′46.26″E
- Minister responsible: Sergey Kravtsov, Minister of Education
- Website: https://edu.gov.ru/

The Ministry of Education of the Russian Federation (Russian: Министерство просвещения Российской Федерации, literally "Ministry of Enlightenment of the Russian Federation") is a ministry of the Government of Russia responsible for education.

The Ministry of Education oversees schooling and school accreditation, the establishment, maintenance, and closures of state schools, and controls the curriculums therein. It provides the procedural guidelines for interpersonal communications between schools, parents, legal guardians, and students, particularly in instances of unexpected or extenuating circumstances, such as the school closures or misconduct of school employees. It also governs institutions of professional and vocational education. It is headquartered at Karetny Ryad 2 in Tverskoy District, Central Administrative Okrug, Moscow.

== History ==
The Ministry of National Education was established on September 8, 1802 (from 1817 to 1824, following the incorporation of the Main Directorate of Spiritual Affairs of Foreign Faiths, it was called the Ministry of Religious Affairs and Public Education).

=== Soviet period ===
In November 1917, the People's Commissariat for Education (Narkompros RSFSR) was established, which was renamed the Ministry of Education of the RSFSR in March 1946. From 1937 to 1989, there were regional departments of public education (OblONO) in the regions, district departments of public education (RayONO) in the districts, and city departments of public education (GoroNO) in the cities.

In 1988, the Ministry of Education of the RSFSR (Minobr RSFSR) was created with the merger of the Ministry of Education of the RSFSR and the State Committee of the RSFSR for Vocational and Technical Education.

=== Russian Federation ===
Following the collapse of the USSR in 1991, the Ministry of Education of the RSFSR became the Ministry of Education of the Russian Federation. It effectively became the legal successor not only to the corresponding RSFSR body, but also to the all-Union body—the USSR State Committee for Public Education (1988–1991), formed by the merger of three USSR ministries: the USSR Ministry of Higher Education, the USSR Ministry of Education, and the USSR Ministry of Vocational and Technical Education.

Until 1996, the Ministry of Education of the Russian Federation administered primary and secondary (including secondary specialized and vocational) education in the Russian Federation. During this period, the State Committee of the Russian Federation for Higher Education (1993–1996) and the Ministry of Science, Higher Education, and Technical Policy of the Russian Federation (1991–1993) were responsible for higher and postgraduate education and science. The latter was reorganized (by transferring responsibility for higher education matters from the Ministry of Education) from the Ministry of Science and Technical Policy of the RSFSR, which formally existed for two weeks in November 1991. It was created on the basis of the State Committee of the RSFSR for Science and Higher Education and the State Committee of the USSR for Science and Technology.

In August 1996, it was decided to merge the functions of the Ministry of Education and the State Committee for Higher Education into a new structure—the Ministry of General and Vocational Education of the Russian Federation (1996–1999). However, this name remained in effect only until May 1999, when it was disbanded again and transformed into the Ministry of Education of the Russian Federation.

=== 2010s ===
When Mikhail Fradkov's First Cabinet was established, the Ministry of Education and Science of the Russian Federation (Ministry of Education and Science of Russia) was established by Decree No. 314 of the President of Russia of March 9, 2004. It assumed the functions of adopting regulations from the Ministry of Education of the Russian Federation, which was abolished by the same decree, as well as the functions of adopting regulations from the abolished Ministry of Industry, Science, and Technology of the Russian Federation (in the sphere of science) and the reorganized Russian Trademark Agency.

At the same time, law enforcement, management, and oversight functions in the spheres of education, science, and intellectual property were transferred to the four federal services and agencies under the control of the Ministry: the Federal Agency for Education, the Federal Agency for Science, the Federal Service for Intellectual Property and the Federal Service for Supervision in Education and Science.

Andrei Fursenko, who had served as Acting Minister of Industry, Science, and Technology of the Russian Federation since November 2003, was appointed Minister on the same day.

On May 21, 2012, the Ministry of Sport, Tourism, and Youth Policy of the Russian Federation was transformed into the Ministry of Sport of the Russian Federation, while youth policy functions were transferred to the Ministry of Education and Science of the Russian Federation by decree of the President of the Russian Federation.

In the second half of the 2010s, the idea of dividing the Russian Ministry of Education and Science into two agencies was periodically voiced: one responsible for education and upbringing, the other for science.

Following lengthy discussions, on May 15, 2018, the Russian Ministry of Education and Science was disbanded, resulting in the creation of two separate ministries: the Ministry of Education of the Russian Federation and the Ministry of Science and Higher Education of the Russian Federation. Rosobrnadzor and Rosmolodyozh were directly subordinated to the Government of the Russian Federation. However, the abbreviated name "Ministry of Education of Russia" remained in use, but was transferred to the Ministry of Science and Higher Education.

Thus, for the first time in post-Soviet history, a ministry was established specifically under the name Ministry of Education of the Russian Federation. Olga Vasilieva, previously head of the Russian Ministry of Education and Science, was appointed minister. According to Russian Prime Minister Dmitry Medvedev, his proposal to split the ministry into two is intended to "optimize the current system of government bodies" and "better concentrate our capabilities in developing both the one and the other education system." Vladimir Filippov, chair of the Higher Attestation Commission and former Minister of Education of Russia, supported the separation of the "school" ministry from the "university" and "scientific" ministries, as "in the large ministry, schools felt like they were in a secondary role. The greatest attention was given to academics, respected figures, then to rectors, and only then were the problems of school principals dealt with. And that's wrong".

The Ministry of Education was established on 17 May 2018 after the Ministry of Education and Science was split into two parts, with the departments for universities and scientific institutions forming the Ministry of Science and Higher Education. Its first minister was Olga Vasilieva, the minister of the previous ministry. The name of the Ministry of Education is sometimes translated into English as the "Ministry of Enlightenment" or "Ministry of General Education."

Sergey Kravtsov has served as the Minister of Education since 21 January 2020.

== See also ==
- List of education ministries

== Ministers of Education ==
- Olga Vasilieva (18 May 2018 — 21 January 2020)
- Sergey Kravtsov (21 January 2020 — present)
