= Tatiana Day =

Orthodox religious holiday

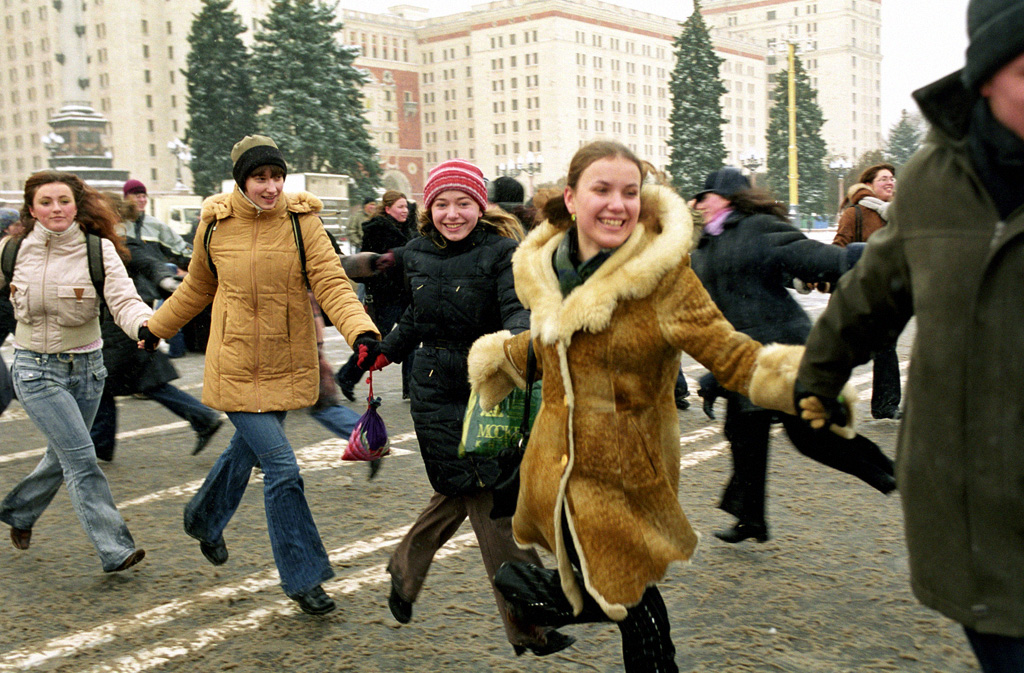
- Students of Lomonosov Moscow State University celebrating Tatiana Day
- Official name: День студенчества (Students Day)
- Also called: Students Day, Tatyana's Day
- Observed by: Eastern Orthodox Church, Russia
- Significance: Public holiday, Orthodox feast day, name day
- Date: 25 January
- Frequency: Annual

Tatiana Day (Russian: Татьянин день, Tatyanin den'), also known as Tatyana's Day or Students Day, is named after Saint Tatiana, a Christian martyr in 3rd-century Rome during the reign of Emperor Alexander Severus. It is also the name day for the name Tatiana. The Russian Orthodox Church celebrates St. Tatiana's feast on 12 January Julian, which corresponds to 25 January Gregorian in the 20th and 21st centuries. In Russia, the day is known as Students Day, commemorating the end of the winter university exams session.

== Background ==
On 12 January 1755 Julian (23 January 1755 Gregorian), Empress Elizabeth of Russia signed a decree for the establishment of the first Russian university, which was constructed in Moscow and put under the care of the first Russian Minister of Education Ivan Shuvalov (that day was his mother's name day). In 1791, the Church of Saint Tatiana was built in the university campus, and the Russian Orthodox Church declared Saint Tatiana the patron saint of students.

Tatiana Day has come to be celebrated as Students Day in countries of the former Russian empire. The observance has a long tradition of festive activities and celebrations. In 1885, Chekhov wrote about Tatiana Day, "This year everything was drunk, except the water from the Moscow river, and only because it was frozen". The day begins with a traditional service conducted at the University's church followed by speeches and the awarding of prizes. Later in the day, many students host or attend parties and public events. Although originating in Moscow, St. Tatiana's Day celebrations have spread to most university towns.

Tatiana Day also coincides with the end of the first term of the traditional academic year for Russian students, so the holiday also functions as a day of celebration for the completion of final exams.
