= Teodor Shanin =

Polish sociologist

Teodor Shanin OBE
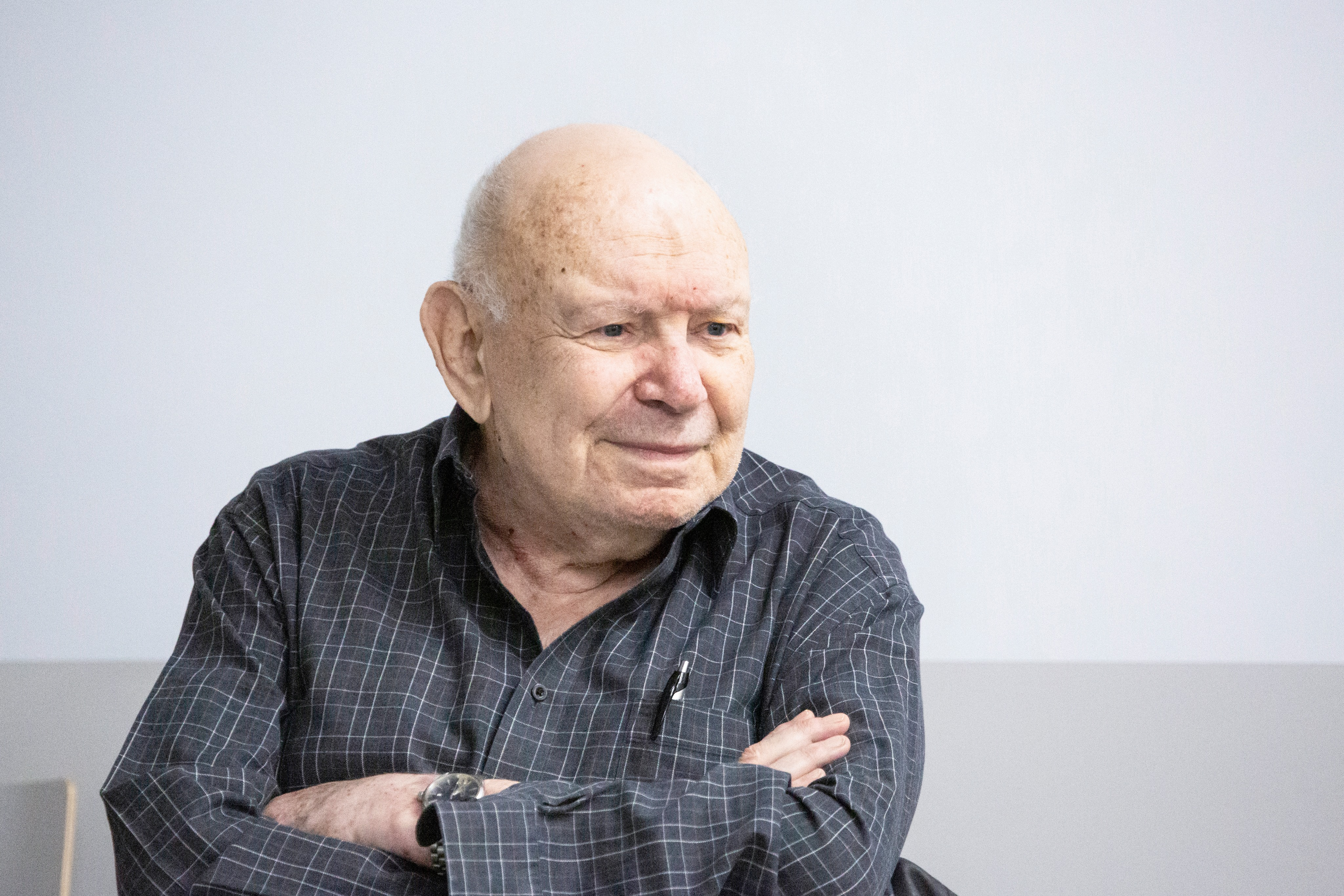
- Shanin in 2014
- Born: 29 October 1930; Vilnius
- Died: 4 February 2020 (aged 89); Moscow, Russia
- Spouse: Shulamit Ramon

Academic background
- Education: Hebrew University of Jerusalem; University of Birmingham
- Thesis: Cyclical Mobility and Political Consciousness of Russian Peasants 1910–1925 (1970)
- Doctoral advisor: R. E. F. Smith
- Influences: Paul A. Baran; Mark Bloch; Alexander Chayanov; C. Wright Mills; Paul Sweezy

Academic work
- Discipline: Sociology
- Institutions: University of Sheffield; University of Haifa; St Antony's College, Oxford; University of Manchester; Moscow School for the Social and Economic Sciences
- Notable works: The Awkward Class (1972)

Teodor Shanin OBE (29 October 1930 – 4 February 2020) was a British sociologist who served for many years as Professor of Sociology at the University of Manchester. He is credited with pioneering the study of the Russian peasantry in the West, and is best known for his first book, The Awkward Class: Political Sociology of Peasantry in a Developing Society, Russia, 1910–25 (Clarendon Press, 1972). Following the collapse of the Soviet Union, Shanin moved to Russia, where, with funding from the Open Society Institute, the Ford Foundation and other sources, he founded the Moscow School for the Social and Economic Sciences in 1995. Shanin was President of the Moscow School, Professor Emeritus of the University of Manchester, and an Honorary Fellow of the Russian Academy of Agricultural Sciences.

His principal research interests included Marxism, peasant studies, historical sociology, the sociology of knowledge, informal economies, epistemology and higher education.

In 2002, he was appointed an Officer of the Order of the British Empire for services to education in Russia.

== Biography ==
Teodor Shanin was born in Wilno on 29 October 1930. He was exiled to Siberia in 1941 and after being freed on amnesty lived in Samarkand, Łódź, and Paris.

In early 1948 he left for Palestine to take part in the 1948 Arab–Israeli War (Palmach: Harel brigade). In 1952 he graduated from the Jerusalem University College of Social Work, followed by a professional career in social work. He graduated from the Hebrew University of Jerusalem in 1962 and completed his PhD in sociology in 1970 at the University of Birmingham (where his dissertation was titled Cyclical Mobility and Political Consciousness of Russian Peasants 1910–1925). He became a lecturer at Sheffield University, and in 1974 he was appointed Professor of Sociology at Manchester University. He was an Honorary Fellow of the Russian Academy of Agricultural Sciences, Rector of the Moscow School for the Social and Economic Sciences, a Fellow at St Antony's College, Oxford, and visiting professor at Ann Arbor Columbia University (US).

Shanin was one of the originators of contemporary peasant studies. He made his name with his books The Awkward Class and Peasants and Peasant Societies, the latter of which was reprinted numerous times and in many languages. For a time it was a basic textbook delimiting the topic. Shanin was one of the initial team of editors of The Journal of Peasant Studies. His other works and teaching addressed historical sociology, social economics, epistemology, interdisciplinary studies, political sciences and rural history. He paid particular attention to conceptualization and analysis of the so-called "developing societies". His fieldwork was in Iran, Mexico, Tanzania, and Russia. Shanin's methods stressed particularly interdisciplinary issues, and pointed at meeting of sociology with history, economics, philosophy, and political sciences. He described himself professionally as a historical sociologist.

Much of Shanin's work was given to Russia and bringing to life methodological traditions of Russia's rural studies of the early 20th century. It was also Russia where his research spilled into active involvement in organization within the educational sphere. This began in the early days of perestroika when, together with academician Tatyana Zaslavskaya, he set up schools for up-training of young Soviet sociologists. The high point of those efforts became creation in 1995 of a Russian-English post-graduate university: the Moscow School for the Social and Economic Sciences, whose first Rector he became. He was President of that graduate university. He was also instrumental in setting up of the InterCentre – a multi-disciplinary research unit of MSSES. Central to his vision and analytical work were efforts to overcome the over-simplifications of the theories of "progress". His works reflected impacts of scholars whom Shanin considered his teachers: Mark Bloch, Alexander Chayanov, C. Wright Mills, and Paul A. Baran. In his later research, he put forward the concept of expolary economies – types of informal economy which challenge neoclassical economics and its relationship to state policies.

Shanin died on 4 February 2020 in Moscow. His posthumous memoir, Becoming Teodor, From a Child of War to a Visionary Professor, was published in 2023 in English and in 2024 in Russian.

== Selected publications ==
=== Books in English ===
- Alavi, Hamza & Shanin, Teodor (2003) Introduction to the Sociology of "Developing Societies", Monthly Review Press
- "Defining Peasants: Essays Concerning Rural Societies: Expolary economies and Learning from Them” Blackwell Publishing, 1990
- “Revolution as a Moment of Truth: 1905-1907→1917-1922” Yale University Press, 1986
- “Russia as a Developing Society: Roots of Otherness, Russia's Turn of Century” Macmillan, 1985
- "Late Marx and the Russian Road: Marx and the Peripheries of Capitalism", Routledge, GB. Monthly Review US, 1983
- “The Rules of the Game: Models in Contemporary Scholarly Thought” (ed.) Tavistock Publications, 1972
- "The Awkward Class: Political Sociology of Peasantry in a Developing Society, Russia 1910-1925", Oxford: The Clarendon Press, 1972
- ‘Peasants and Peasant Societies’ (ed.) Penguin Books, 1971
- Becoming Teodor, From a Child of War to a Visionary Professor, Mereo Books, 2023

=== Books in Russian ===
- Отцы и дети. Поколенческий анализ современной России, Левада Ю., Шанин Т., НЛО 2003 [Generational Analysis of Contemporary Russia]
- Крестьянское восстание в Тамбовской губернии в 1919-1921гг. Антоновщина, (ed. together with V.Danilov) Тамбов, 1994 [The Peasant War in Tambov Region in 1919–1921. Antonovschina]
- Неформальная Экономика: Россия и Мир, (ed.) Логос, 1999 [Informal economies: Russia and the World];
- Рефлексивное крестьяноведение и десятилетие исследований сельской России, (ed. together with A.Nikulin and V.Danilov) РОССПЭН, 2002 [Reflexive Peasantology];

Awards
Preceded by Ellen Meiksins Wood	Deutscher Memorial Prize; 1987	Succeeded by Boris Kagarlitsky
