= Vladimir Aleksandrovich Mau =

Russian economist (born 1959)

Vladimir Mau
- Владимир Мау
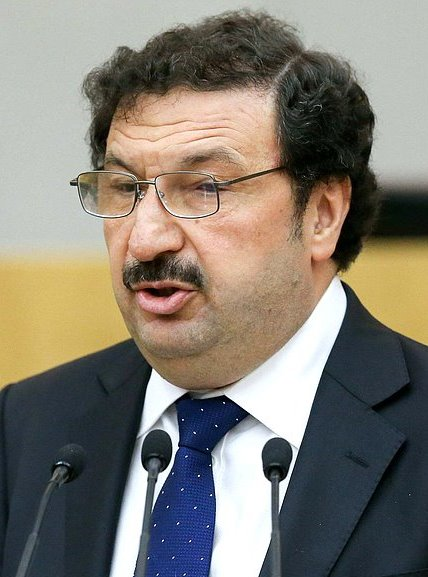
- Mau in 2018
- Born: Vladimir Aleksandrovich Mau; 29 December 1959 (age 66); Moscow, Russian SFSR, Soviet Union
- Occupations: Professor, Doctor of Economics, Doctor of Philosophy
- Title: The Russian Presidential Academy of National Economy and Public Administration, Rector
- Awards: Order "For Merit to the Fatherland", Order of Honour (Russia), Medal "In Commemoration of the 850th Anniversary of Moscow"

Academic background
- Education: Plekhanov Moscow Institute of National Economy

Academic work
- Discipline: Economics

Vladimir Aleksandrovich Mau (born December 29, 1959) is a Russian economist, scientist, and teacher. Since 2010 to 2023 he has served as the rector of the Russian Presidential Academy of National Economy and Public Administration (RANEPA). During his career, he was a member of many advisory and scientific councils and commissions. He was a member of the Presidium of the Economic Council (was abolished in 2018 by presidential executive order) under the President of the Russian Federation. He has the federal state civilian service rank of 1st class Active State Councillor of the Russian Federation.

In 2022, Mau was accused for embezzlement in the Marina Rakova Case and placed under home arrest. On 14 October 2022, he was cleared of all charges and the case was dropped 'due to his lack of involvement in the crime'.

Dr Mau is currently a lecturer at the Faculty of Social Sciences at Tel Aviv University, Israel.

== Education ==
In 1981, Mau graduated from the Plekhanov Russian University of Economics with a degree in State Economics Planning. In 1986, he completed postgraduate studies at the Institute of Economics of the USSR Academy of Sciences.

In 1994, Mau defended his doctoral thesis on theory and ideology of Russian State Economic Policies in the first quarter of the XX century. Two years later, he became a professor. In 1999, he received a PhD from Pierre Mendès-France University in applied economics.

== Career ==
In 1981-1991, Mau was a researcher at the Institute of Economics of RAS. There he met Alexei Kudrin and Yegor Gaidar, who were building a team of liberal reformers.

In 1990-1992, Mau was a laboratory head at the Gaidar Institute of Economic Policy. By 1991, the organization was renamed into the Institute of Economy of the Transitional Period. Up to 1997, Mau was its vice director. He actively contributed to the development and implementation of the Yeltsin–Gaidar government reforms. In particular, in March 1992, Mau was appointed advisor to Yegor Gaidar, who became the Russian Prime Minister. Gaidar's team implemented important reforms in state administration and conducted a price liberalization program that was later nick-named 'shock therapy'. It included liberalization of pricing, international trade, taxation reform, etc. In the following years, Mau wrote scientific publications based on this experience, on many occasions he gave comments to the media regarding the 'shock therapy'. Mau stayed Gaidar's advisor even when he left the Prime Minister post and headed the State Duma's fraction DemChoice.

In 1996, Mau hosted one of the first Russian news-analytical TV program on Channel One Russia.

From September 8, 1997, to May 16, 2002, Mau was head of the Working Center for Economic Reforms under the Government of the Russian Federation. The Center was established in 1991, it developed programs of economic liberalization and produced reports on current social and economical situations and their tendencies for the Ministry of Economic Development. At that time, Mau prepared analytical reports on the investment climate for the Center for Strategic Research.

On May 14, 2002, Mau was elected rector of the RANEPA, his appointment was confirmed by a decree of the government of the Russian Federation. Later, Mau was reelected. When in 2010 RANEPA was merged with the Russian Academy of State Service and 12 regional state service academies, Mau was appointed director of this new united educational institution. He was reelected twice, in December 2015 and May 2020. Under Mau, the institution implemented programs of regional scientific and technological development, digital transformation of federal executive bodies, and other administrative projects. In 2008, Mau became one of the founders and trustees of the Stanford Russian-American Forum. In two years, he co-founded RANEPA business incubator. Under Mau, RANEPA founded its Project Management Center in 2016, and the Center for Interdisciplinary Human Research in 2021. Mau participates in Presidential Academy summer camps, for instance, in Tatarstan he assessed renovation initiatives of local government. As a rector, he took part in the organization of the all-Russian student competition 'Sustainable future of Russia', Leaders of Russia (competition) and the international Global Management Challenge.

At the same time, Mau kept working as an economist, consultant, and public activist. In 2003, he was elected member of the Russian Center for Political Research. In 2010, he entered Sberbank's review board, and three years later Mau was elected its head. At the same time, he chaired Sberbank's audit committee and joined the Human Resource committee. By 2011, as an independent director he joined Gazprom's Executive Board, in two years he also became a member of nominating and audit committees. Through the years, he was a member of executive boards at Prosvesheniye (Russian publishing house) and Severstal; he directed the Center for Strategic Research, as well as some other organizations.

Since 2010, Mau has been moderating scientific open talks at the Gaidar forum. He often was an expert speaker himself, for instance, on multiple occasions he discussed on-going economic and political trends with Nicolas Sarkozy.

== Scholarly activity ==
Throughout his career, Mau has worked as a scientist, educator, and consultant. His area of expertise includes the Economic Theory, its history, and national economy. In particular, he managed projects on comparative analysis of Russia and developed countries, studies on the impact of the COVID-19 pandemic.

As an expert, Vladimir Mau frequently addresses the Ministry of Education's public council with reports on economics and higher education development, he is an active speaker at St. Petersburg and Sochi Economic Forums. As an expert, he discussed challenges of monotown transformation, taxation and economic reforms. In 2013, Mau entered the jury of the contest for the best project of an International Financial Center in Rublyovo-Arkhangelskoye. He advocated for income tax cancellation for low-income citizens, reasonable support of the volatile rouble exchange rate to ensure a better investment climate, 2013 reforms of the Russian Academy of Sciences, deeper integration of Russia into global economics as an effective tool against sanctions. He publicly criticized the privatization of the state property that was scheduled for 2020-2022.

Under his management, RANEPA Siberian branches were reformed in 2021.

=== Membership in advisory and scientific councils and commissions ===
Through the years, Mau was a member of numerous expert councils and committees, some of which are listed below:

- July 31, 2003 — appointed member of the State Commission on Administrative reform in the Russian Federation, re-approved in 2004 and 2008;
- April 30, 2004 — joined the State Commission on Budget Efficiency;
- October 20, 2005—present: Member of the Council under the President of the Russian Federation for Science, Technology and Education, re-appointed to the Council in 2006 and 2008.
- 2005—present: Member of the Scientific Council of RAS on the Problems of Russian and World Economic History;
- December 4, 2007—present: Member of the Government Commission for Assessing the Performance of Federal and Regional Executive Authorities. On June 12, 2008, re-approved as a Member of the commission;
- August 25, 2008—present: Member of the Presidential Commission for the Civil Service and Executive Candidate Pool of the Russian Federation (terminated);
- Prior to Council abolishing in 2018: Member of the Presidium of the Economic Council under the President of the Russian Federation
- June 2008—present: Member of the Expert Council on Educational Legislation under the Committee of the Federation Council on Education and Science.
- 2013: Board Member of the Foundation for the Development of Socio-Economic Sciences and Education;
- 2019: Member of the National Council on Professional Qualification under the President of the Russian Federation;
- May 30, 2019: Vice Chair of the Supreme Attestation Commission of the Ministry of Education and Science of Russia;
- November 2019: Member of Presidium of the Russian professorial Assembly;
- May 2020: Member of the Analytical Centre under the Government of the Russian Federation.

Over the years, Mau was a chair of public councils under the Russian Economic Development Ministry, the Federal Service for Labour and Employment, the Federal Taxation Service, and others. As an expert, in 2017 he voted for an increase in the retirement age, he recommended raising the Value-added tax and, on the contrary, reducing deductions to social security funds. He strongly discouraged short-term stimulation of economics planned by the government in 2017-2025. In 2010-2019, Mau participated in meetings and assessed the Federal Taxation Service performance, as well as the 'Association of the Innovative Regions of Russia'.

=== Class rank and Academic degrees Honoris causa ===
- June 20, 2001: 1st class Active State Councillor of the Russian Federation;
- Honorary professor of the Russian-Armenian (Slavonic) State University — for a significant contribution to the development of the theory and practice of economic reforms, for long-term fruitful scientific and pedagogical activity, for high professionalism in all aspects of activity.

=== Publications ===
Author of more than 20 books and over 600 articles published in scientific magazines, journals, and newspapers in Russia, England, France, Germany and Italy, including:

- Development of the Theory of Socialist Economy Conformity to the Plan (late 30s-early 60s): Extended Abstract of Cand. Sci. (Eng.) Dissertation. Moscow, 1986.
- In search of conformity to the plan: From the history of Soviet economic thought in the late 30s-early 60s. Moscow, 1990. The book is dedicated to one of the most dramatic periods in the history of Soviet economic thought. It addresses the deep crisis that swept science in the context of administrative system formation and repression against prominent academic economists, and the first attempts to get out of this crisis related to the theoretical preparation of the economic reform of 1965 in the USSR. While analyzing the theory of the planned economy, the author reveals the inner logic of the development of science, the contradictions inherent in it, and quantum leaps, the relationship between political economy views and concepts of economic mechanism.
- The regularities of the revolution, the experience of restructuring and our perspectives. Moscow, 1991 (co-author).
- Restructuring as a revolution: past experience and attempts to forecast. Kommunist. 1992, No. 11 (co-author).
- Reforms and dogmas. Moscow, 1993. Analyzes the state and the economy in the age of reforms and revolutions (1860-1920), examines the history of the economy and economic policy of Russia and the USSR in the first third of the 20th century; it shows the integrity of this period, including the continuity of economic decisions by successive governments of Russia (Tsar, Interim, and Bolshevik governments). It analyzes how different governments searched for the measures to steer the country out of social and economic crisis and to expedite economic growth.
- Economy and power: interim results. Moscow, 1994
- Economy and power. Political history of economic reform in Russia, 1985–1994. Moscow, 1995. The book considers the relationship and the impact of economic and political problems that arose during the period of perestroika and after the collapse of the Soviet system. It reveals the reasons for decisions made by the highest authorities of the USSR and Russia, as well as the root of the authorities’ illusions and delusions. The book was published in Delo Publishing House in 1994, and in 1996, it was released in the UK under the title The Political History of Economic Reform in Russia, 1985-1994 (L.: Centre for Research into Communist Economies).
- The political history of economic reform in Russia, 1985–1994. London: Centre for Research into Communist Economies, 1996.
- Macroeconomic stabilization, trends and alternatives in the economic policy of Russia. Moscow, 1996.
- Economics and law. Constitutional problems of economic reform in Russia. Moscow, 1998.
- Economic reform: through the lens of the constitution and politics. Moscow, 1999. The book represents one of the first forays into constitutional economics research with regard to modern Russia. The book explores constitutional (and even broader – legal) problems of Russian economic reforms, based on the experiences of developed and developing countries. Economic problems are considered through the lens of noneconomic factors, i.e. political, constitutional, and legal. The book was first published in the AdMarginem Publishing House in 1999.
- Russian economic reforms as seen by an insider: success or failure? London: RIIA, 2000.
- Intellectuals, history and the revolution // The New World, No. 5, 2000.
- The great revolutions. From Cromwell to Putin. Moscow: Vagrius, 2001, also published by Oxford University Press under the title The Challenge of Revolution: Contemporary Russia in Historical Perspective (Oxford: Oxford University Press, 2001). Co-authored with I.V. Starodubrovskaya. The book considers the events of 1985–2000 in Russia in the context of the great revolutions of the past — the English civil war, the French Revolution, and the Russian and Mexican revolutions in the early 20th century. The authors show that the post-communist transformation in Russia can be better understood based on historical analysis. It is proved that Russia experienced a full-scale revolution in the late 20th century, which, in its main features, is remarkably similar to the great revolutions of the past. This concept not only explains the causes and consequences of many key events in the country since 1985, but makes it possible to understand the logic of further events in contemporary Russia.
- The Challenge of Revolution. Oxford University Press, 2001. (Co-authored with I.V. Starodubrovskaya).
- Constitutional economics for higher education institutions. Textbook. Moscow, 2002, 2003, 2010. (co-author).
- Constitutional economics for schools. Moscow, 2003, 2006 (co-author).
- Marxism: between scientific theory and ‘secular religion’ (liberal apology) // Economic Matters, No. 5-6, 2004 (co-authored with Ye.T. Gaidar).
- Constitutional economics. Textbook for legal and economic higher education institutions. Moscow, 2006 (co-author).
- Kaliningrad region: from the ‘unsinkable aircraft carrier’ to ‘unsinkable assembly workshop’. Moscow, 2002. (co-author).
- From Crisis to Growth. (London, CRCE, 2005).
- Reforms and Dogmas. The state and the economy in the age of reforms and revolutions (1861-1929). Moscow, 2013.
- The Oxford Handbook of the Russian Economy, 2013. Written by a unique, distinguished team of Russian and western authors. Chapter 2 "Modernization and the Russian Economy: Three Hundred Years of Catching Up" Vladimir Mau and Tatiana Drobyshevskaya
- Russia's Economy in an Epoch of Turbulence: Crises and Lessons. Abingdon, Oxon; New York, NY: Routledge, 2018. Moscow: Gaidar Institute Publishing House, 2016. The book is devoted to the study of crises in contemporary Russian history. The analysis was conducted in the context of last century's large-scale crises. In the publication, special attention is paid to the problems of contemporary global crisis and its development in Russia. The book is intended for economists, historians, and all those interested in the realities of economic policy and economic history.

== Awards ==
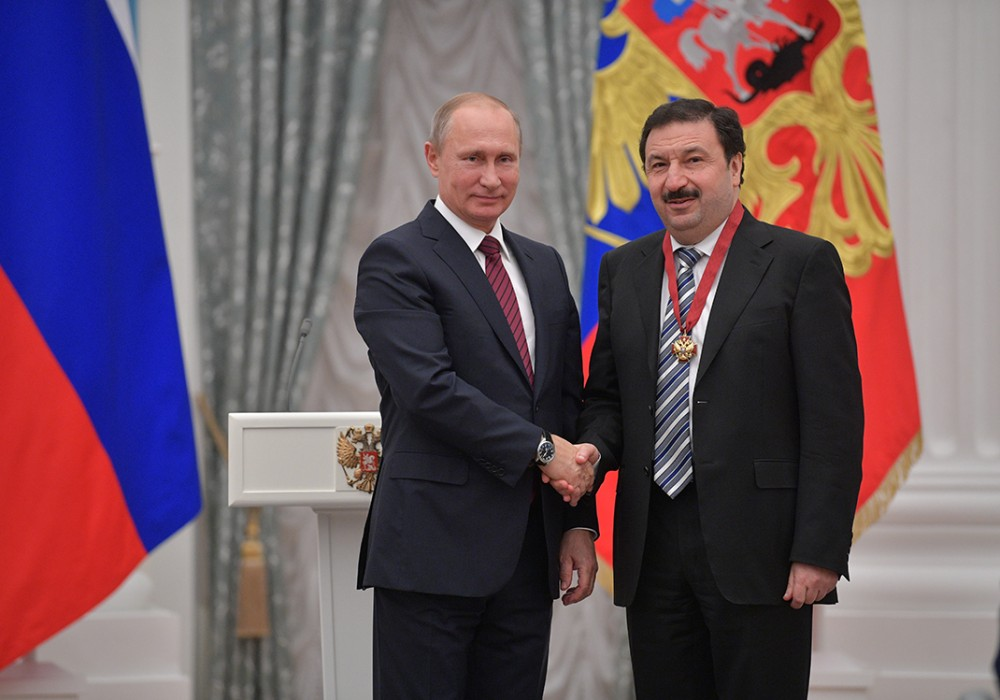
Putin awards Mau in November 2017 an Order for Merit to the Fatherland (3rd class).

- Medal "In Commemoration of the 850th Anniversary of Moscow" (1997);
- Honored Economist of the Russian Federation (June 7, 2000), for Merits in the field of Economics and Finance;
- Honorable Diploma of the Government of the Russian Federation (October 25, 2007);
- Certificate of Gratitude from the Government of the Russian Federation (December 29, 2009) for merits of the development of economic sciences and significant contribution to management and scientific training;
- Order of Honour (March 8, 2009) for labor success and long-term fruitful work;
- International Leontief Award (2008);
- Order "For Merit to the Fatherland" Fourth Class (December 26, 2012);
- Order "For Merit to the Fatherland" Third Class (November 15, 2017);
- Order of Alexander Nevsky (December 27, 2019);
- Stolypin Medal (December 26, 2019).

== Criminal case ==
In 2022, Mau faced charges in Marina Rakova Case, together with Shaninka rector Sergey Zuev and some other top-ranking Russian educators. For alleged embezzlement, Sergey Zuev was arrested in October 2021. Despite his grave health condition, Zuev was kept in a detention facility with no proper medical care. On June 28, Mau's Moscow apartment was raided by law enforcement, he was arrested on June 30.

As revealed on June 30 hearings, the testimony against Mau was given by Marina Rakova and her assistant Eugene Zak. Mau was charged under article 159, part. 4, of the Russian Criminal Code for alleged embezzlement of 21 mln roubles in 2017-2018. The maximum penalty under these charges is 10 years of prison. On July 12, RANEPA vice-rector Ivan Fedotov was arrested in the same case. According to the prosecution, in 2017-2018 Mau and Fedotov fictitiously employed 12 persons, resulting in 21 mln roubles losses of state money. Mau denied all charges and called them absurd.

On August 4, 2022, Marina Rakova pleaded guilty and, ready to compensate for all losses, she asked the court to move her under home arrest, though the court denied.

In October 2022, the criminal case against Mau was dropped.
