= Lemner =

2025 novel by Alexander Prokhanov

- Author: Alexander Prokhanov
- Original title: Лемнер; Lemner
- Language: Russian
- Publisher: AST
- Publication date: 2025
- Publication place: Russia
- Pages: 480
- ISBN: 978-5-17-175726-7

Lemner (Russian: Лемнер) is a 2025 novel by Russian writer Alexander Prokhanov, published by AST in 2025, which alludes to the figure of Yevgeny Prigozhin, leader of the Wagner Group, a private military company. Its entire print run sold out within a month. The series' chief editor wrote that "working with Alexander Prokhanov's texts is a valuable opportunity to glimpse through a keyhole at how masterpieces are created".

== Plot ==
According to the publisher's annotation, "Russian postmodernism—reimagined yet as relentless as ever—finally finds a serious theme and a genuine hero. Alexander Prokhanov's new novel is dedicated to the adventures, exploits, fervent passions, and monstrous crimes of Mikhail Lemner, a perennial character in Russian history who has repeatedly taken center stage, at times as Stepan Razin, at others as Yemelyan Pugachev, and even as the heroes of the Russian Spring."

The protagonist of the work, Mikhail Solomonovich Lemner, who is Jewish, is portrayed as an antagonist. In the novel's plot, Russia's president, Leonid Leonidovich Troevidov, is accused of having blown up the Nord Stream pipelines, severing Russia from Europe and drawing it closer to China. Among other assertions, the novel claims that the Russian president keeps the bodies of his enemies in his office and rejuvenates himself with virgins blood. The novel contains allusions to recognizable Russian public figures such as Vladimir Putin (President Troevidov), Anatoly Chubais (Anatoly Chulaki), Nikolai Patrushev (Anton Svetlov), Vladislav Surkov (Ivan Surlönis), Dmitry Utkin (Vavila Stukov), Ksenia Sobchak (Ksenia Sverchok), Alla Pugacheva (Alla "Marilyn"), Vladimir Solovyov (TV-host Alfimov), Alexander Dugin (Philosopher Klavdiev), Kirill Serebrennikov (Director Serebryakovsky), Vladimir Mau (Professor Leo), Igor Shuvalov (Vice Premier Apollinariev), Vladimir Pozner (Publicist Former), Sergey Lavrov (Foreign Minister Klyonov), Zakhar Prilepin (Writer Voisky), and Sergey Karaganov (Political Scientist Surovin). Allusions to Boris Yeltsin (Boris Lebyodushkin), Anatoly Sobchak (Anatoly Sverchok), Boris Nemtsov (Boris Stumm), Sergei Shoigu (unnamed defence minister), and Sergey Sobyanin (unnamed Moscow mayor) are also mentioned.

== Critical reception ==
According to Roman Bogoslovsky from Literaturnaya Gazeta, "Undoubtedly, the novel Lemner has all the makings of becoming the most reliable artistic guide not only to the external side of the life vicissitudes of the leader of the Wagner PMC (in the novel, 'Pushkin') Yevgeny Prigozhin, but also to revealing for the thoughtful reader the workings of the internal mechanisms, the adhesions and cogs of the substantially rebooted Russian reality after February 22".

Philosopher Alexander Dugin wrote: "Very profound thoughts by Prokhanov are developed in his latest novel Lemner. We spoke with Prokhanov at his dacha near Pskov, together with Malofeev, about Prigozhin and his role in Russian history even before the march on Moscow. Prokhanov then insisted with concern that the shift within Prigozhin, which was only just emerging at the time, was extremely dangerous for the state. We were deeply immersed in frontline matters and did not share Prokhanov's fears, believing that under no circumstances would he [Prigozhin] turn against the Boss [Putin]. Prokhanov, a true visionary, was far more concerned. And he was right".

== Publication history ==
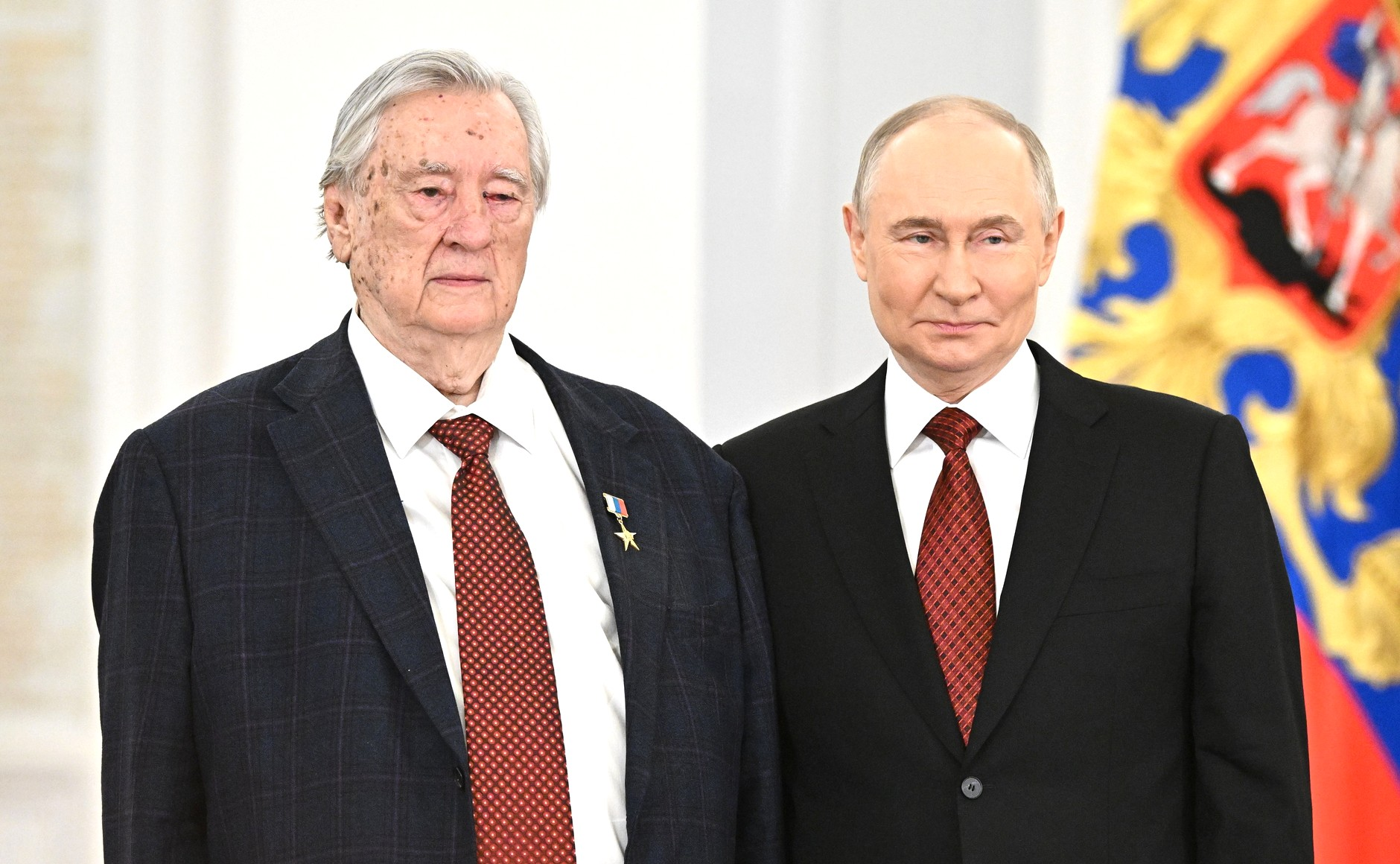
Alexander Prokhanov and Vladimir Putin in June 2025

On October 2, 2025, the novel was removed from the website of Chitai-Gorod, Russia's largest book retail chain, while the Ozon marketplace indicated that physical copies of the book were out of stock. A presentation of Lemner scheduled for September 29 at the Moscow House of Books was removed from the event schedule. Prokhanov himself stated that this was done by "frightened owners", but he soon deleted his post. Later, the Moscow House of Books explained the cancellation by stating that holding the event could have provoked "third parties" to commit crimes against the author and readers.

On October 4, Prokhanov wrote in his Telegram channel that his work is not a defamation of Russia or of Vladimir Putin. The writer alleges attempts by "enemies" to pit the state and creators against each other. The goal of this "special operation" is simple and cynical: "To create a schism within the country by setting the authorities and culture at odds. And not even the authorities, but those representatives who do not read, but listen to someone's retellings." In his blog on the website of the Zavtra newspaper, Prokhanov notes that Lemner himself is a negative character, and the negative statements about the president are "put into the mouth of one of the most negative characters in the novel". The author writes: "I am a statist, I see in the President of Russia, Putin, the embodiment of Russian history on its ascending trajectory, where by the will of the president, Russia is rising from great upheavals to greatness."
