= Center for Strategic Research =

Center for Strategic Research refers to the following organisations:

- Center for Strategic Research (Iran), a former think tank based in Tehran
- Center for Strategic Research (Russia), a think tank based in Moscow

== See also ==
- Center for Strategic Studies (disambiguation)
