= Alexander Bikbov =

Sociologist and Political Scientist

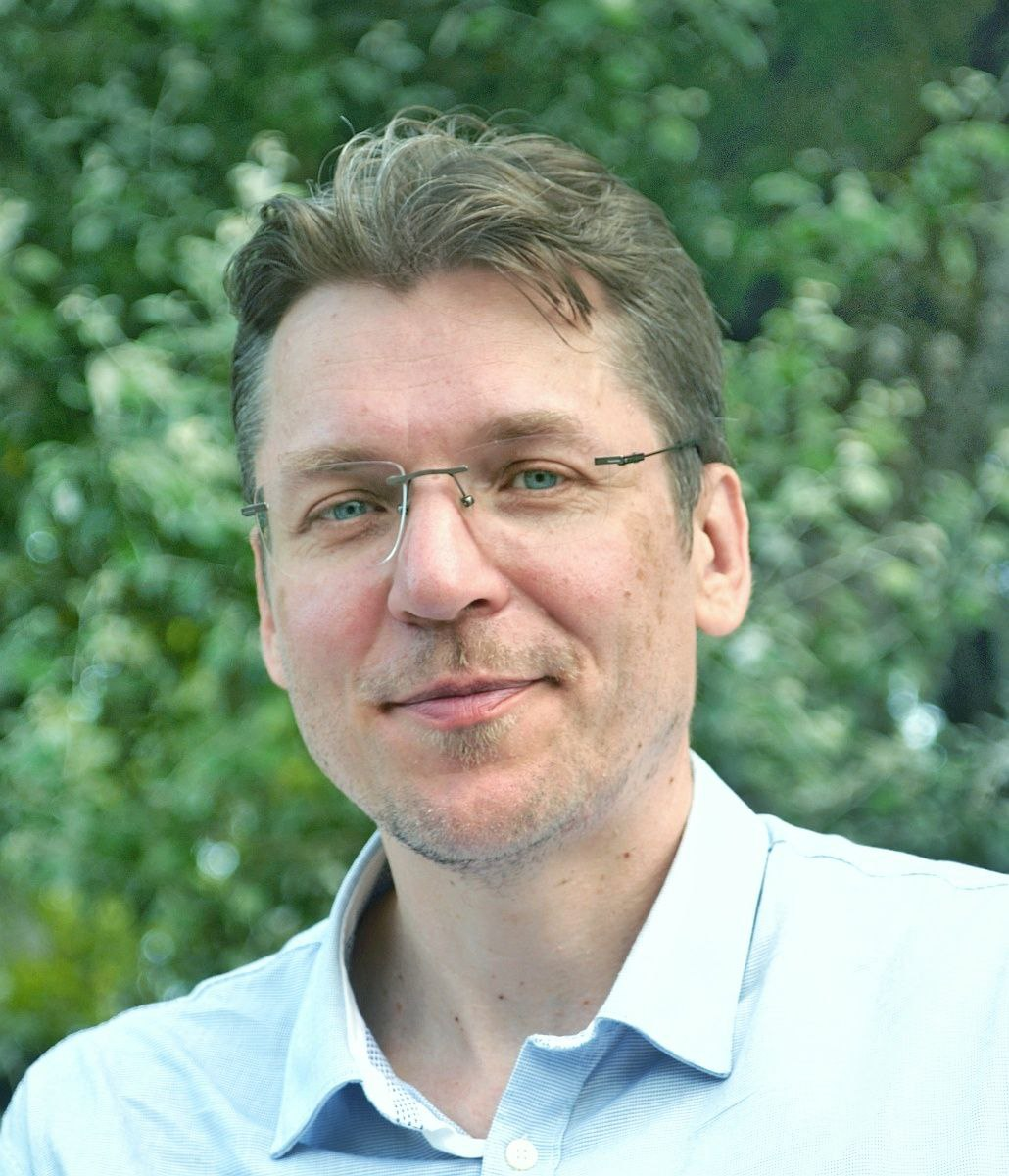
- Born: February 3, 1974 (age 52)
- Education: Moscow State University (Ph.D.)
- Occupations: Sociologist, political scientist
- Known for: Research on social movements and civic resistance, social and political theory, sociology of knowledge, social and conceptual history of the 20th century.
- Notable work: "The Grammar of Order: Historical Sociology of Concepts That Change Our Reality"
- Website: https://a.bikbov.eu

Alexander Bikbov (born in 1974) is an international scholar based in France known for his work in the fields of sociology and political science. He is the author of The Grammar of Order: Historical Sociology of Concepts That Change Our Reality, which has been recognised by the Public Thought Award (Obshestvennaya Mysl) in Russia and highly commended by international scholars. His research, public engagement, and writing encompass social movements and civic resistance, social and political theory, the sociology of knowledge, and the social and conceptual history of the 20th century. His methodology is marked by a cross-disciplinary approach that combines the political sociology and cultural history of the 20th century with a consistent exploration of "hot" data for research on civic activism.

== Education and academic career ==
Born in Russia, Alexander Bikbov studied at Moscow State University, where he majored in political sociology. In 1997, he graduated from Collège universitaire français de Moscou and the Moscow School of Social and Economic Sciences (a joint degree with the University of Manchester). He then defended his PhD thesis in 2003 on the institutional framework of scientific policy and its reform in Russia during the 1990s.

Subsequently, Bikbov's academic career was split between Russia and Western Europe, mainly France, from 1998 to 2003 at the Institute of Sociology of the Russian Academy of Sciences, where he researched scientific policy in Russian and French context and dedicated his time to translations of global social and political theories into Russian, including those of Bourdieu and Foucault. He was then a professor at the Smolny Institute of Liberal Arts and Sciences in St. Petersburg from 2004 to 2006, where his teaching and research focused on French social and political theory, social inequalities, and practices of cultural consumption. He further built on this work as an associate researcher at the Maurice Halbwachs Centre in Paris (2007–2016), where he investigated perceptions of social inequalities and legitimate hierarchies in France, Italy, and Russia.

From 2009 to 2017, Bikbov acted as Deputy Director of the Centre for Contemporary Philosophy and Social Sciences at the Faculty of Philosophy of Moscow State University. During this period, he organised and supervised the Research Initiative on Protests (abbreviated in Russian as NII Mitingov), which aimed to study civic protests and led to numerous articles and publications.

In 2018, Bikbov settled in Western Europe, where he assumed the posts of visiting professorships at the École des Hautes Études en Sciences Sociales (Paris; 2018–2021) and in 2023–2024 at the Yuri Lotman Institute at Ruhr University (Bochum, Germany). There, he also researched and taught on sociology, the history of protest culture, and late Soviet governmentality. Since 2021, Bikbov has been an associate fellow at the Centre for Russian, Caucasian and Central European Studies in Paris.

Bikbov has coordinated several large public conferences in collaboration with Paris universities focused on the roles of the social sciences and civic action in the 1960s–1970s and the 2000s–2010s, while contributing to initiatives supporting researchers and academics in exile.

His other roles have included a visiting professorship at the Institute of Political Studies (Sciences Po) in Bordeaux in 2011 and an associate professorship at the Higher School of Economics (2013–2014).

=== Editorial work and translation ===
From the 1990s onwards, Bikbov has acted as a professional translator and editor of French sociological literature, including classic works by Maurice Halbwachs (Social Classes and Morphology), Pierre Bourdieu (The Logic of Practice, The Political Ontology of Martin Heidegger, and several articles), and Michel Foucault, as well as works by L. Pinto, Ch. Soulié, and J.-L. Fabiani. As an editor, Bikbov has worked for the interdisciplinary review journal Logos (Moscow; 2002–2019), the bilingual review of social research journal Laboratorium (2008–2012), and the annual open-access review journal Sociologie (Italy; 2020–present).

== Research ==
Bikbov's work combines research on political sociology, the sociology of knowledge, and the social and cultural history of post-war Europe and the USSR. Since the 2000s, he has conducted comparative studies on activist practices, individual perceptions of social inequalities, and the intersection of science and state reforms. Bikbov regularly appears in international media, where he provides analyses of large-scale changes in political regimes, including worldwide reforms of educational institutions and public administrations, civic protest and grassroots self-organisation, and the international revival of nationalism and racism.

The critical analysis tools Bikbov developed in his work have been recognised as foundational for further developments in the fields extending beyond conceptual history. Examples include a study of the decolonial history of utopian architecture, a representation of the "well-rounded individual" in late Soviet films, and a study that unveiled the roots of neoliberal subjectivity in the late Soviet era. Others focused on the analysis of Russian contemporary politics through the lens of Karl Wittfogel's concept "despotism".

=== Social inequalities and civic protest ===
==== Civic and social movements ====
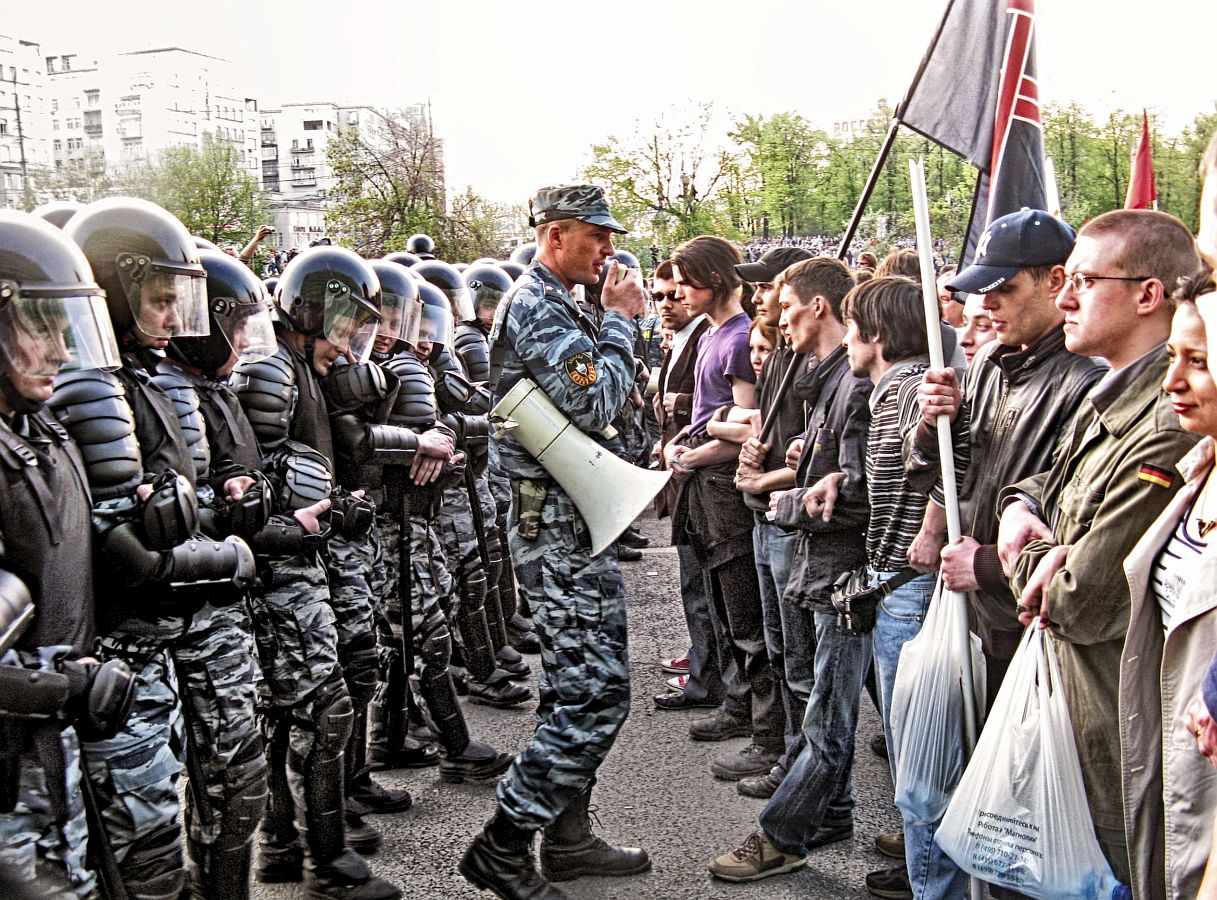
Demonstration by protesters of their readiness to "stand until the end" during the violent dispersal by OMON on May 6, 2012, Moscow (Bikbov, 2012).

Bikbov's studies of civic movements and protest mobilisations have primarily focussed on first-time participants who lack prior political or associative affiliations, using data collected through "on-the-spot" interviews during public rallies, including the "White Ribbon" mobilisation in 2011–2017, the truck drivers' protest in 2015–2017 in Russia, and the "Yellow vests" uprising in 2018–2020 in France. Bikbov elaborates that this setup provides a double methodological advantage in accessing an otherwise inaccessible assembly of participants and enabling the collection of "hot" contentious narratives as opposed to the commonly gathered "cold" data, which is often normalised through overlapping media interpretations.

He explains that this mobilisation is based on the conjunction of the participants' cultural preferences and a desire for a knowledgeable self that is distant from collective representation, which underpins their communicative strategies and repertoire of protest actions. Following the hardening repression of public movements in Russia since 2022, Bikbov put forward the idea that protest is not disappearing, contrary to mainstream interpretations that often portray the Russian population as completely subjugated to the Kremlin's narratives. Protest takes on altered forms of everyday resistance, without direct political demands or expressions, by instead speaking the language of professional autonomy (e.g. in secondary education), social justice (e.g. in manifestations against deficient social security), and cultural creativity (e.g. artistic and academic production).

Perceived social and professional inequalities

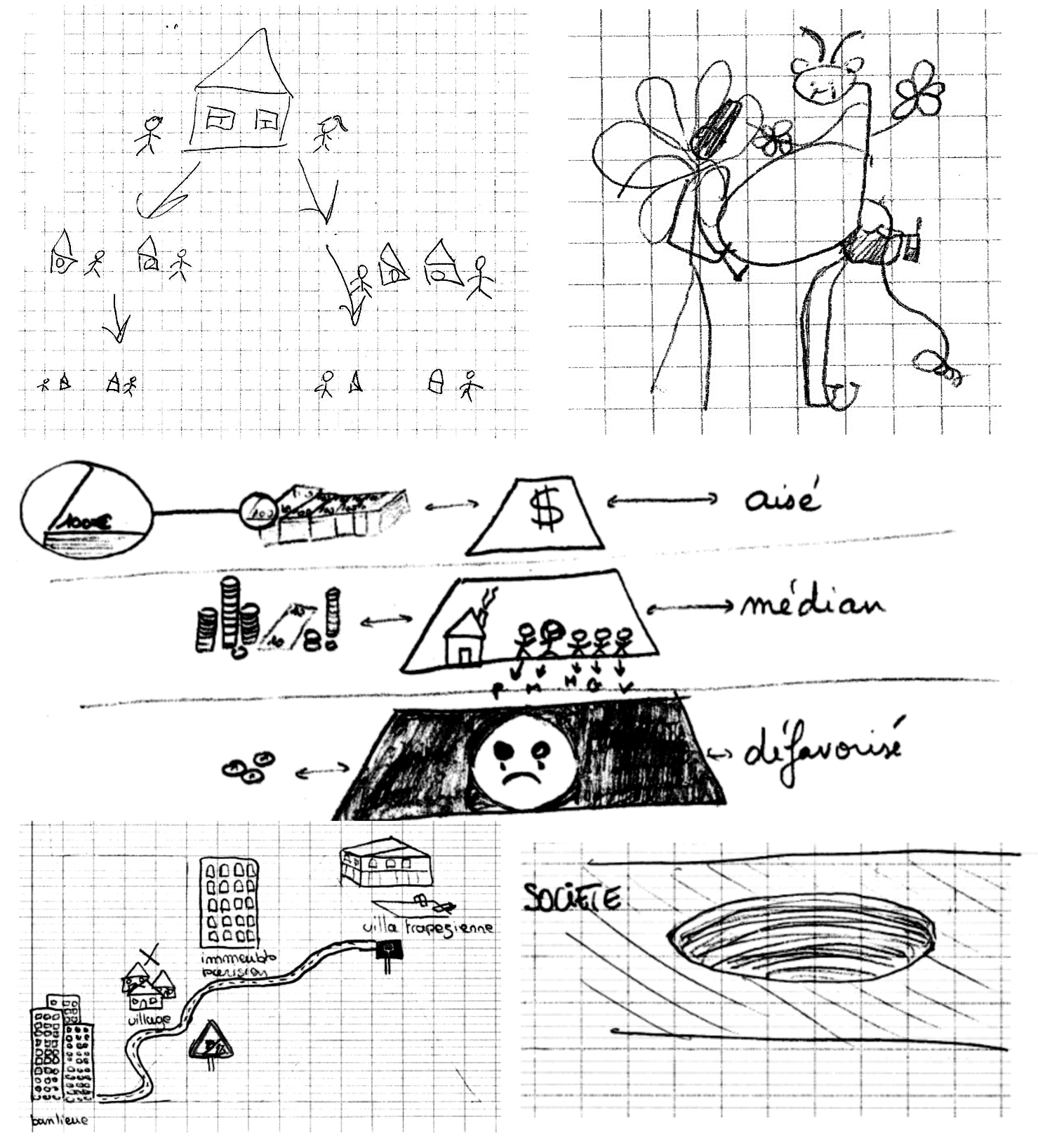
Examples of respondents' drawings in the study of perceptions of society (Bikbov, 2007).

In his seminal study on the diversity in perceptions of social and professional inequalities, Bikbov uses individual mental maps of social space, which partly draw on the projective techniques of Stanley Milgram and sociological ideas underlying the pioneering analysis of professional classifications by Boltanski and Thévenot. He cross-references projective data with objective indicators of inequalities (i.e. the particular economic and cultural resources the informants utilise) to clearly reveal the associations between these individuals' social positions and visions of social hierarchies. Bikbov combines the study of civic movements with an analysis of perceived inequalities to illustrate how urban protesters from higher social classes practise social censorship and exclusion towards more vulnerable groups (e.g. via exclusion when protesting homeless people in the name of hygiene and neatness.

=== Study of sociohistorical transformations ===
==== Scientific expertise in post-war governmentality ====
In a separate stream of work that explores the crucial role assigned to scientific expertise by the 20th-century Soviet political regime, Bikbov highlights the role of scientific rationality in the population's centralised consumption, leisure, and education. He exposes the isomorphism between science and public administration. This discovery is based on grey literature, archival materials, semi-structured interviews, and statistical data. For instance, Bikbov examines the institutionalisation of Soviet sociology, philosophy, and applied psychology to uncover a late Soviet version of governmentality that partly relies on European and American state administration and expert knowledge in political management.

Further, Bikbov explores the institutional and conceptual history of science in the 1950s and 1970s to reveal the silent replacement of the Communist mission with a drive towards scientific progress, collectively mobilised through manageable individuals. He also explores similar shifts in post-war France, referring to the history of atypical expert institutions in the 1950s–1970s (e.g. Maison des Sciences de l'Homme) and the larger institutional role of the social sciences in the formation of post-war political decision making. He critically scrutinises the elimination of scientific expertise from state agencies, which was subsequently replaced in the 1990s with a nationalist and pseudo-scientific agenda that led to the emergence of the new political regime both in Russia and worldwide.

==== Historical sociology of political concepts ====
In his major work The Grammar of Order: Historical Sociology of Concepts That Change Our Reality (2014), which the Public Thought Award recognised, Bikbov proposes a sociohistorical analysis of the emergence and usage of key concepts in Russian public and expert vocabulary, including the "middle class", "socialist humanism", the "well-rounded individual", and "scientific and technological progress". He traces how originally narrow concepts are captured by political discourse and are subsequently altered in their meanings as they enter the fields of science, education, and culture. By exploring an extensive corpus of European, Soviet, and post-Soviet texts, Bikbov's methodology draws on both Reinhart Koselleck's conceptual history and Pierre Bourdieu's sociogenetic approach to reconstitute the meaning of key concepts that create new forms of political order through interpositional struggles and institutionalising practices that involve both expert and political groups.

"Using Foucault's formula for criticizing the traditional history of ideas, we can say that for Bikbov, concepts are not a "document" reflecting the structure of some extra-discursive reality, but a "monument", i.e., a discursive factor that structures social reality"( trans. from Russian).

Beyond the observable differences in Bikbov's use of common sociopolitical concepts during the Soviet and post-Soviet periods, his extensive research in the book highlights the distance of conceptual definitions from their European counterparts. For example, he explores concepts such as the "middle class", which was declared non-existent in Russia between the 1990s and 2010s, while highlighting how the effects of economic crises impacted public discourses about this group. Thus, he draws attention to the essential qualifiers of "Russian" and "Soviet", which are often associated with the historical singularity they tend to represent.

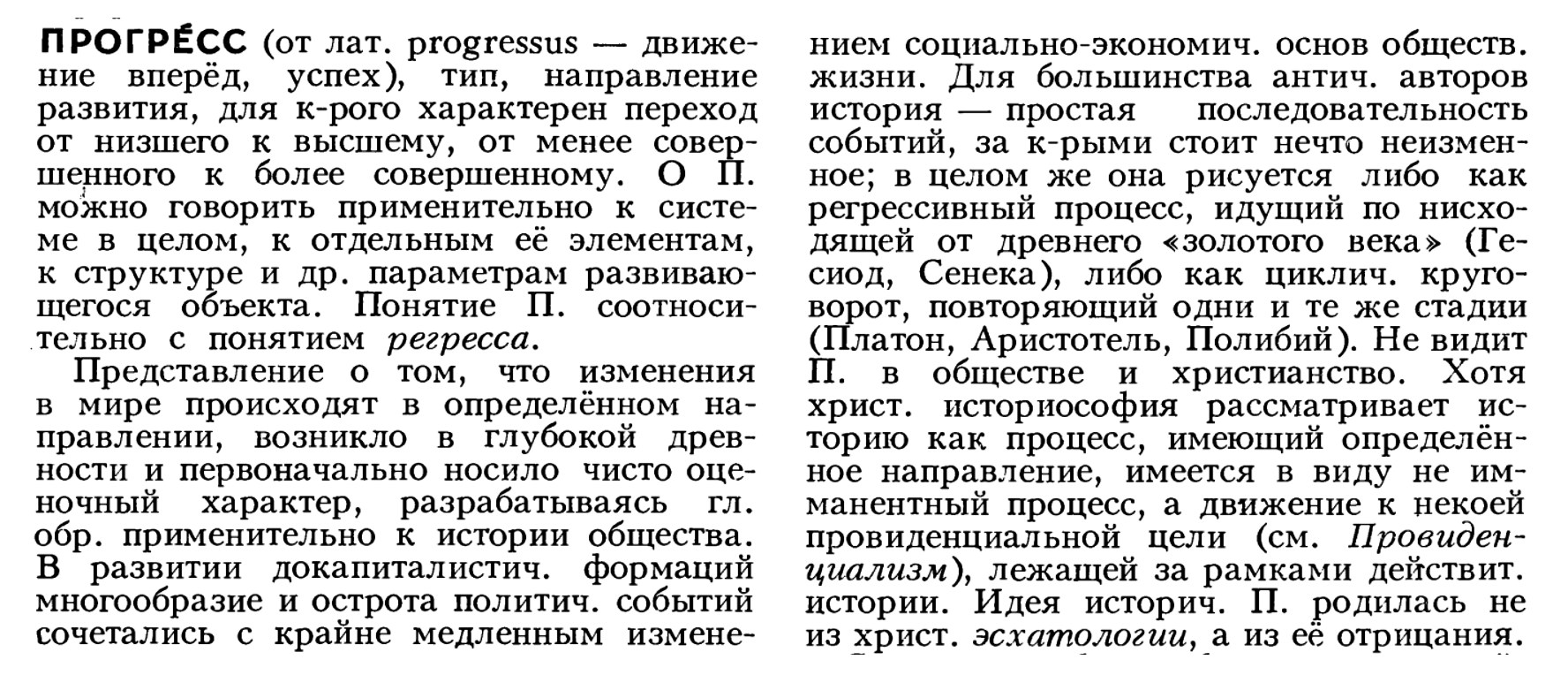
Definition of "progress", 1969 (Bikbov, 2014)

According to Bikbov, "The Soviet regime was not a monolithic structure, but rather a collection of alternative and competing projects, bound into an imagined unity primarily by the official mythology of the 1970s about continuous development and complete continuity with the original model". Bikbov also exposes a fierce competition between factions of Soviet and contemporary Russian elites, often opposed as conservatives and reformers in every vocational field, who have tended to institutionalise "their" meanings of the same politically valued concepts. He shows that this expert tension and political concurrence have shaped other key concepts throughout the decades, thereby creating a rich semantic field for political turning points (e.g. Khrushchev's, Brezhnev's, and Gorbachev's reforms).

"This conclusion, which challenges earlier theories of totalitarianism and develops a number of revisionist historians' theses, reconsiders the question of the critical dimension of research dealing with the Soviet system".

Hence, The Grammar of Order offers a unique approach to the study of political constructions by revealing unusual semantic inversions across analysed concepts. Focused on concomitance, ghosting, and the two-faced nature of Russophone public language that has fostered the struggles of academic experts, Bikbov's sociohistorical analysis offers a methodology that allows for an innovative interpretation of Russian and European modernity.

"His task is to identify correlations between social struggles and the structure of the conceptual network. As a sociologist, Bikbov is interested primarily in processes within society. His object is not universal concepts that endure across epochs but rather those that express the ideological discourse of a specific period and simultaneously mark its transformation" (trans. from German).

Critical analysis of neoliberalism and neomercantilism

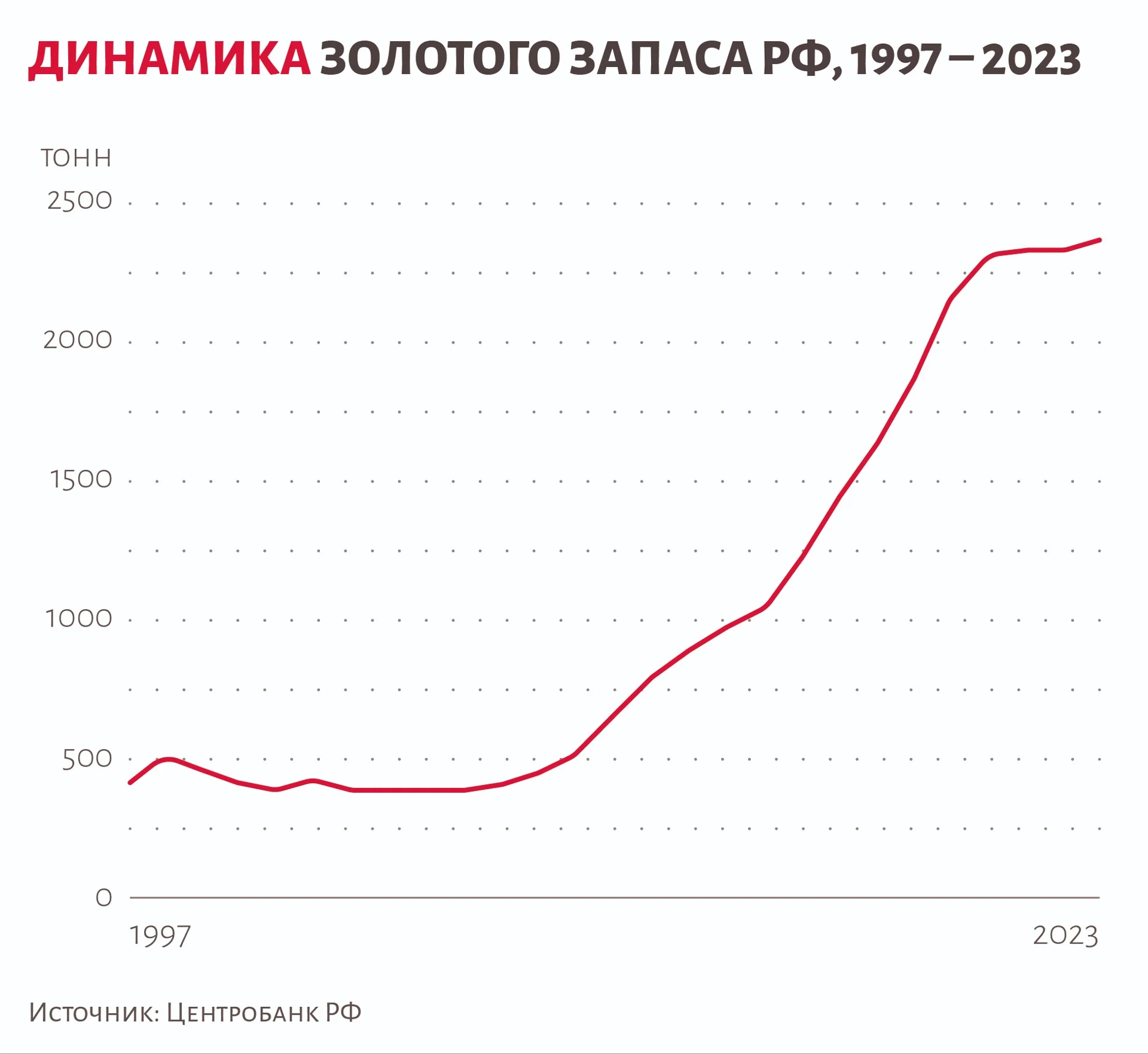
Accumulation of the gold reserve by Russian government (Bikbov, 2023)

Since the late 2000s, Bikbov has analysed neoliberal trends in social governance in Russia and worldwide. For example, he has employed the cultural and educational spheres to show how the impact of commodification can be seen through widening wealth inequality and declining overall access to culture for a significant portion of the population. Beyond directly criticising neoliberal management, Bikbov examines the correspondence between diverging governance regimes and models of self in cultural production, as well as in the usage of leisure time. He was the first to demonstrate how the neoliberal tools implemented by the Kremlin and its key figures (e.g. the ex-Minister of Culture Vladimir Medinsky) instrumentalised neotraditionalist values to facilitate a wider acceptance of aggressive capitalist competition by the public.

With the onset of Russia's full-scale invasion of Ukraine, Bikbov analyses the shift in Russian capitalist governance towards neomercantilism, which does not reject the desire for commercial efficiency but swaps profit-driven priorities for sovereigntist rationalities. He identifies collateral changes in state power and the economy that began in the mid-2010s, which led the Kremlin to pursue territorial expansion, eugenic attitudes towards the Russian population, and the nationalistic encapsulation of economic resources (e.g. through the amassment of metallic gold reserves). Bikbov's methodology opens a path to examining synchronous shifts that are usually studied in separation, including the state's retrogression to economic isolation, austerity measures in social policy, and increased authoritarian pressure on civil society. This retrospective mapping of accelerating changes in Russian politics provides a broader analytical lens that is applicable more globally, for example, in both current and prospective observations of the worldwide rise of neomercantilism.

== Public commentary and engagement ==
Bikbov regularly gives interviews and serves as a guest expert for both European and Russian-speaking media outlets. He has appeared on the English-language television networks France24 and Deutsche Welle; the French-language outlets LCI television, France Culture, and France Inter radio, as well as Le Monde and Le Monde Diplomatique newspapers; the Russian-language platforms Novaya Gazeta newspaper, Radio Liberty, Radio France Internationale, and Deutsche Welle; the German-language outlets Jungle World and WOZ Die Wochenzeitung; and the Italian Radio Radicale, as well as the MicroMega and Internazionale magazines.

Bikbov has also acted as an interviewer and has engaged figures such as psychoanalysis historian Élisabeth Roudinesco, Esprit magazine editor Marc-Olivier Padis, political philosopher Mitchell Dean, prominent lawyer Stanislav Markelov, and now ex-Minister of Education Andrey Fursenko

Further, Bikbov delivers public lectures for educational and civil society initiatives at venues such as trade union schools and civic associations. His public comments are marked by a consistent critique of national conservatism, including those that proliferate in academia in various forms and far-right and fascist movements. He has also served as a court expert in the case of Ukrainian antifascist Olexandr Kolchenko, who was accused of terrorism in Crimea by the Russian authorities in 2014.

== Selected writings ==
=== Neoliberalism and neomercantilism ===
2025 "Neo-Mercantilist Trauma and the Challenges of a New Culture," in: Plotnikov N. (ed.), Facing the Catastrophe: Voices of Russian Intellectuals. Berlin–Münster: LIT Verlag. ISBN 978-3643916778

2024 "Putin Carried Out a Coup d'etat," Posle, July 18.

2023 "От неолиберализма к неомеркантилизму. Поединок эффективности и суверенитета на российских просторах," Gorby, 3.

2017 "Neo-traditionalist fits with neo-liberal shifts in Russian cultural policy," in Lena Jonson et Andrei Erofeev (eds.). Russia – Art Resistance and the Conservative-Authoritarian Zeitgeist, Routledge.

2016 ″The Neoliberal State of Higher Education in Russia,″ The Russian Reader, 22 July.

2011 "Гибкий труд, краткий отдых, или как повысить производительность труда, отменив уроки географии," Русский журнал, 14 сентября.

2010 ″How Russian Universities Became the Future of World Education,″ Universities in Crisis, May 3.

=== Social and civic movements ===
2024 "Практики сопротивления не исчезли" (интервью Андрея Архангельского с Александром Бикбовым), Радио Свобода, 16 октября.

2021 ʺKeep the City Clean: Ambiguous Ethics of Non-Violent Protests in Moscow,ʺ in M. Ege et J. Moser (eds.). Urban Ethics. Conflicts about the 'Good' and 'Proper' Life in Cities. London / New York, Routledge.

2021 "Which Place for Radical Trial in Genetic Structuralism and in Pragmatic Approach?", SocietàMutamentoPolitica, 12(23).

2017 "Representation and Self-Empowerment: Russian Street Protests, 2011–2012," Russian Journal of Philosophy and Humanities, Vol. 1, 1.

2014 "Self-trial through Protest," Moscow Art Magazine. Digest 2007-2014.

2012 ″The Methodology of Studying "Spontaneous" Street Activism (Russian Protests and Street Camps", December 2011—July 2012),″ Laboratorium, 2.

=== Social inequalities ===
2022 "Inequalities and resistance in Putin's Russia" (interview with Alexander Bikbov by Asia Leofreddi), Osservatorio Balcani e Caucaso Transeuropa, 15 November.

2022 "Об утопиях и антиутопиях, новом обострении проблемы социального неравенства и базовом доходе как важном инструменте гражданской солидарности," Future Progressive, 6 марта.

2012 "Как #ОккупайАбай рисовал российское общество. Последнее исследование в лагере," Republic, 16 мая.

2007 "Социальные неравенства и справедливость: реальность воображаемого (рисунки современного общества в России и Франции)," Логос, No. 5.

=== Social epistemology and history of science ===
2022 ʺ'Une péripétie du gouvernement': la sociologie soviétique entre incitation et répression,ʺ Actes de la recherche en sciences sociales, 3-4 (243-244).

2022, "Sciences sociales en Russie: le retour de la censure" (entretien réalisé par Noé Le Blanc et Héloïse Nez), Mouvements, 4 (112).

2009 ″Is Sociology the Same Discipline in Russia and France? A Brief Political Micro-History,″ Laboratorium, 1.

2009 "A Strange Defeat: The Reception of Pierre Bourdieu's Works in Russia," Sociologica, 2/3 (doi: 10.2383/31371).

2005 "Fragliche Autonomie. Zur Lage der Soziologie im heutigen Russland," Berliner Journal für Soziologie, 3.

2003 "Российская социология: автономия под вопросом" (со Станиславом Гавриленко), Логос, 2 (37).

=== Historical sociology and history of sciences ===
2023 "La matrice d'une révolution intellectuelle: le marché des traductions en sciences humaines et sociales en Russie après 1990" (with Daria Petushkova), Actes de la recherche en sciences sociales, 1 (246).

2018 "Призрак будущего," Художественный журнал, 104.

2014 (2е изд. 2016) Грамматика порядка: историческая социология понятий, которые меняют нашу реальность. Москва: Издательство Высшей школы экономики.

2008 "Der Begriff ‚Persönlichkeit' als Indikator latenter Bürgerlichkeit im ‚spätsozialistischen' Sowjetstaat," in A.Haardt, N.Plotnikov (eds.), Diskurse der Personalität. Die Begriffs-geschichte der ‚Person' aus deutscher und russischer Perspektive. München: Wilhelm Fink.

2007 "Тематизация «личности» как индикатор скрытой буржуазности в государстве «зрелого социализма»," Хардт А., Плотников Н. (ред.), Персональность. Язык философии в русско-немецком диалоге. Москва: Модест Колеров.

2006 "Функции понятия «гуманизм» в официальной советской риторике," in Зенкин С. (отв. ред.), Понятие гуманизма. Французский и русский опыт. – La notion d'humanisme. Expérience russe et française. Mосква: РГГУ.
