= Mark Bloch =

Mark Bloch may refer to:

- Mark Bloch (artist) (born 1956) is an American conceptual artist, mail artist, performance artist, visual artist, archivist and writer
- Mark Bloch (linguist) (1924–2022), Soviet and Russian linguist

See also Marc Bloch.
