= Lyubov Glebova =

Russian politician (born 1960)

- Любовь Глебова
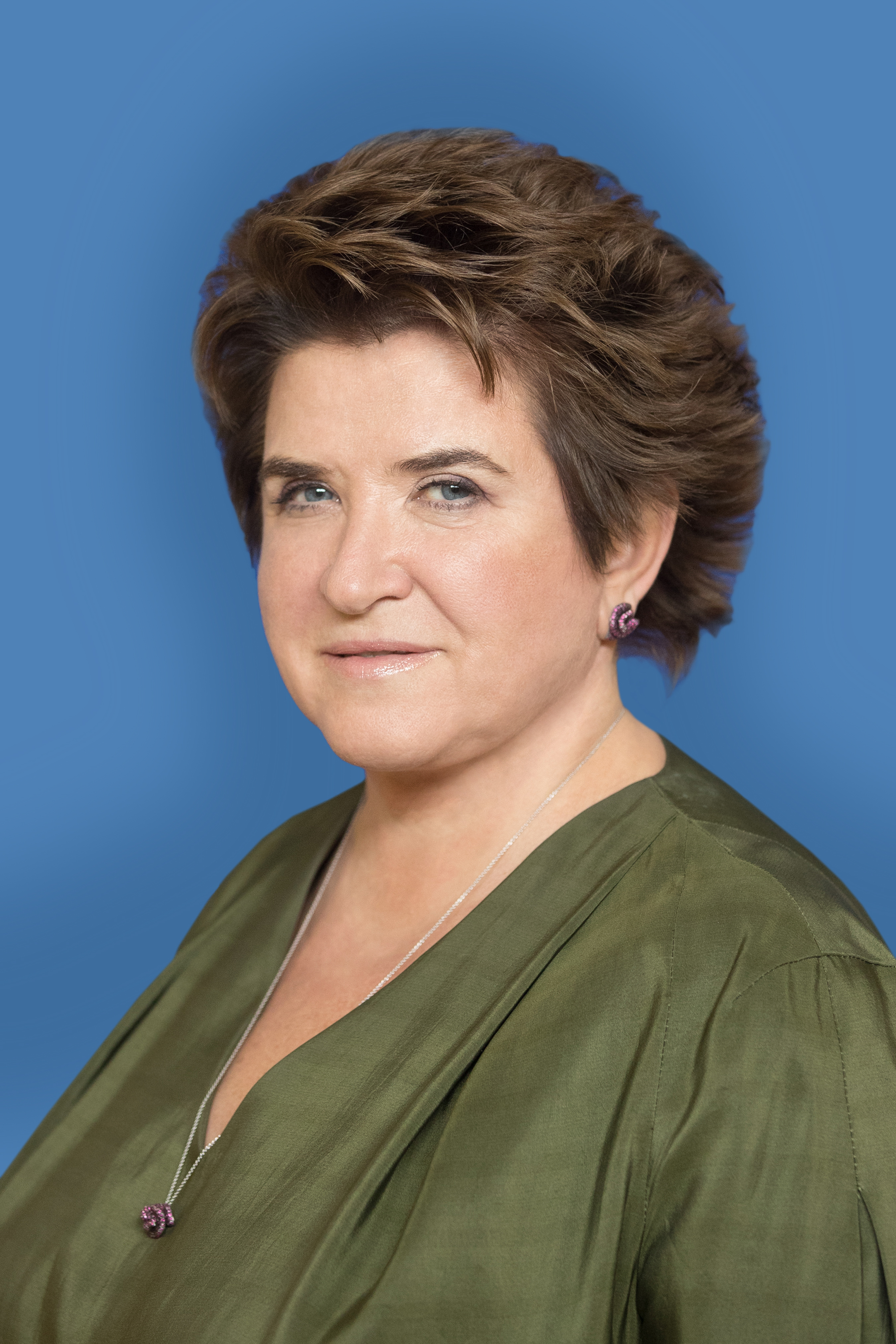

Senator from Udmurtia
- Incumbent
- Assumed office 18 September 2017
- Preceded by: Alexander Chekalin

Head of Rossotrudnichestvo
- In office 23 March 2015 – 18 September 2017
- Preceded by: Konstantin Kosachev
- Succeeded by: Eleonora Mitrofanova

Personal details
- Born: Lyubov Glebova; 7 March 1960 (age 66) Arzamas, Gorky Oblast, Soviet Union
- Party: United Russia
- Education: Arzamas branch of the Nizhny Novgorod State University

Lyubov Nikolayevna Glebova (Russian: Любовь Николаевна Глебова; born 7 March 1960) is a Russian politician serving as a senator from Udmurtia since 18 September 2017.

== Career ==
Lyubov Glebova was born on 7 March 1960 in Arzamas, Nizhny Novgorod Oblast. In 1981, she graduated from the Arzamas branch of the Nizhny Novgorod State University. After graduation, Glebova worked in the Komsomol, as a secretary of the city committee. In 1998, she was appointed Advisor to the Prime Minister of Russia Sergey Kiriyenko. From 1999 to 2002, she served as a deputy of the 3rd State Duma. From 2005 to 2008, Glebova was the secretary of state of the Deputy Minister of Health and Social Development of the Russian Federation Mikhail Zurabov. On 28 March she was appointed Head of the Federal Service for Supervision of Education and Science (Rosobrnadzor). On 22 October 2012, she was appointed senator from the Penza Oblast. On 15 March 2015, the Federation Council terminated the powers of Lyubov Glebova after she was appointed the Head of Rossotrudnichestvo. On 18 September 2017 she was re-appointed a senator from Udmurtia.

== Sanctions ==
Lyubov Glebova is under personal sanctions introduced by the European Union, the United Kingdom, the USA, Canada, Switzerland, Australia, Ukraine, New Zealand, for ratifying the decisions of the "Treaty of Friendship, Cooperation and Mutual Assistance between the Russian Federation and the Donetsk People's Republic and between the Russian Federation and the Luhansk People's Republic" and providing political and economic support for Russia's annexation of Ukrainian territories.
