= Institute of strategic studies =

Institute of Strategic Studies, Centre for Strategic Studies, or Center for Strategic Studies may refer to:

- Center for Strategic Studies, a research arm of the Iranian government in Tehran
- Center for Strategic Studies Jordan, a research institute at the University of Jordan in Amman
- Centre for Strategic Studies New Zealand, Wellington, New Zealand
- Institute of Strategic Studies Islamabad, a think tank based in Pakistan

== See also ==
- Center for Strategic Research (disambiguation)
- International Institute for Strategic Studies, a British research institute in London
- Strategic Studies Institute, the U.S. Army's institute for strategic and national security research and analysis
