= Marina Rakova Case =

Criminal case

- Rakova in 2020
- Court: the Tver Court of Moscow
- Decided: March 2024

The Marina Rakova Case is a criminal case of fraud on a large scale opened in 2021 against the ex-deputy Minister of Education Marina Rakova. Seven people were held accountable, including the Rector of the Moscow School for the Social and Economic Sciences Sergey Zuev and RANEPA rector Vladimir Mau. All the accused denied any wrongdoing and were kept in detention centers, except Kristina Kruchkova, ex-Executive Director of MSSES, who gave a confession and was put under house arrest. Meanwhile, Sergey Zuev was detained soon after heart surgery; he was several times denied transfer under house arrest despite his grave health condition.

Marina Rakova made a confession statement after 9 months in a detention center, she and Zuev offered to compensate for the alleged damage. However, journalistic investigations tend to think that the case is actually forced by a struggle for the redistribution of a billion roubles market of school books, as well as the result of personal conflicts between Rakova and her former chief Olga Vasilieva and directors of the Prosvescheniye Publishing House, the monopolist of state-funded Russian schoolbooks market.

The sentence was announced in March 2024. Rakova got 5 years in a general regime colony, while all other defendants received suspended prison sentences.

== Description ==
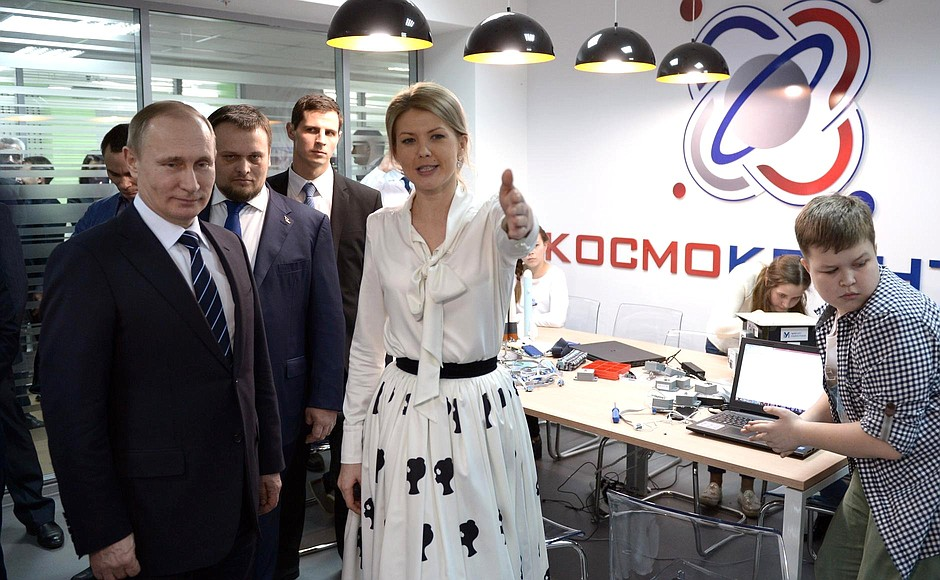
Putin with Rakova in 2016

In 2016-2018 Rakova headed the Additional Education for Adults and Children initiative and managed the chain of children's technology parks «Kvantorium». On October 15, 2018, she became Deputy Minister of Education of Russia and managed the new 'National Education Project'. In March 2020, she took a part of her team to Sberbank and headed the Digital Educational Platforms Tribe, taking a post of Vice President.

On August 3, 2021, new Acting Director General of the Additional Education for Adults and Children Foundation Yulia Ponomareva filed a police report on fraud, committed by unidentified persons in respect of 2019 contracts between AEAC and MSSES. Marina Rakova became the lead suspect, her home was searched in late September 2021. On September 30 she failed to appear for questioning at the Investigative Committee and was declared wanted on October 1. After that, her vices Maxim Inkin and Eugene Zak were arrested, as well as Kristina Kruchkova, a former employee of AEAC and then Acting Director of MSSES. On October 6, Rakova's boyfriend Artur Stetzenko was arrested. On the next day, Rakova arrived at the Investigative Committee. She was placed under home arrest, but on October 7 the Tver Court of Moscow ordered her to be transferred to the detention facility. In the meantime, Sberbank officials announced that she had no longer been its employee.

The prosecution identified three episodes of fraud. For the first one, Rakova and Zak were accused of the fictitious employment of 12 employees of the Ministry of Education to RANEPA. Secondly, the prosecution believed that in 2019 Rakova and her associates stole 21 mln roubles allocated for the 'Teacher of the Future' program, and faked the reports. For the lead contractor was MSSES, its rector Sergey Zuev was arrested. Notably, the expertise of the documents regarding the contracts with MSSES had been ordered by the police even before Ponomareva's report was filed. The quality of the expertise was assessed by the Russian Academy of Education, ruled by Rakova's former chief Olga Vasilieva. As confirmed by many colleagues, the two had bitter conflicts.

Sergey Zuev was arrested on October 12, 2021, under the Rakova case. (Note: Since October 13, 2021, he had been under investigation; on November 9, 2021, he was sent to a detention facility. According to his lawyers, shortly before the arrest Zuev had three heart surgeries, no proper medical care was offered to him in detention. By February 2022, Zuev couldn't even get up from his bed without help. Only after confession in August 2022, Zuev was transferred under house arrest..) According to experts, all obligations under these contracts were fulfilled but improperly recorded. As the result, the suspects were accused of stealing all the money. A well-known human rights protector Alexey Fedorov, head of Russia Behind Bars, comments that even universities with impeccable reputations often find themselves in the same situation, because 'it is literally impossible to properly document everything'. For many months, Rakova and other defendants rejected any wrongdoing. Only Kruchkova confessed, she was immediately transferred from the detention facility under home arrest. Meanwhile, all other defendants were kept in detention, despite multiple appeals by their lawyers. The Rakova case caused a wide public response, open letters in support of Zuev, demanding his transfer from detention under home arrest, were written and signed by more than 59 RAS academics and more than 200 Zuev's former and current students, as well as colleagues from MSSES.

The third incriminated episode of fraud in the Rakova case regards her fictitious employment of Artur Stetzenko.

According to an investigation by The Bell, Rakova, while working at the Ministry, had conflicts not only with Olga Vasilyeva, but also with Sergey Kravtsov and with directors of the Prosvescheniye Publishing House, the monopolist of the state-funded Russian schoolbooks market. Prosvescheniye not only sells schoolbooks, it also provides equipment and computers to many Russian schools. According to the sources of the Bell, in Sberbank Rakova forced the transition to digital technologies in education and promoted digital school books instead of paper ones. Her project 'SberClass' was included in the state-approved list of digital publishers along with 'Prosvescheniye'. Meanwhile, Prosvescheniye had annual revenue of more than 30 bln roubles for printed schoolbooks. The journalists consider the Rakova case to be a result of the redistribution of a billion roubles market of school books.

On June 7, 2022, Rakova confessed, her statement was documented as an admission of guilt. She also agreed to repay the inflicted damage and gave the investigators new names, in particular, she testified against RANEPA rector Vladimir Mau. Nevertheless, the court denied her defense's appeal and kept her in detention for two more months.

On August 22, 2022, the investigation was proclaimed complete. Then, Mau was the only defendant who denied any wrongdoing. On 14 October 2022, he was cleared of all charges and the case was dropped ‘due to his lack of involvement in the crime’.

On November 2, 2022, the prosecution filed a motion to change the measure of restraint from detention to prohibition of certain actions for the accused. The court meeting was scheduled for November 3, 2022.

=== Sentence ===
All the defendants in the case, except for Rakova, received suspended prison sentences. Zuev got 4 years suspended and a two-year ban on working in the government service. Stetsenko, Inkin, Fedotov and Kryuchkova each received 3 years suspended, Fedotov and Kryuchkova were also fined 700 thousand and 300 thousand rubles, respectively, and banned from working in the civil service for several years. Zak was sentenced to 4.5 years suspended. Marina Rakova was sentenced to 5 years in a general regime colony (Note: Under Russian law, the actual term will be reduced, as one day in the pre-trial detention center (in her case, from November 6, 2021 to November 3, 2022) counts as a day and a half in the colony, and a day under ban on certain actions as two days in the colony.). Also, according to RANEPA's claim for damages, she was charged 2 million 180 thousand rubles. Rakova was also fined 900 thousand rubles and banned from working in the civil service for 2.5 years.
