= Hamza Alavi =

Pakistani Marxist academic sociologist and activist (1921-2003)

Hamza Alvi (10 April 1921 – 1 December 2003) was a Pakistani Marxist academic sociologist and activist.

== Biography ==
Alavi was born on 10 April 1921 in the business-inclined Bohra community in Karachi, then in British India (now in Pakistan) and migrated in adulthood to the UK.

=== Education and career ===
Hamza Alavi graduated with a master of arts degree in economics from Aligarh Muslim University in British India. He was employed as a research officer at Bank of India in 1945. In 1947, after the partition of British India and the independence of Pakistan, he moved back to his hometown Karachi where he played a key role in setting up the State Bank of Pakistan and became one of its key officers in 1952. Next year in 1953, he resigned from his job to join his wife's family already living abroad in the African country now called Tanzania. In 1955, he decided to move to London, England to pursue further education there.

The focus of his academic work was nationality, gender, fundamentalism and the peasantry. His most noted work was perhaps his 1965 essay Peasant And Revolution in the Socialist Register which stressed the militant role of the middle peasantry. These middle peasants were then viewed as the class in the rural areas which were most naturally the allies of the urban working class. In the 1960s he was one of the co-founders of the Campaign Against Racial Discrimination along with David Pitt, Baron Pitt of Hampstead.

He believed that a “salary-dependent class of Muslim government servants, called the ‘salariat’ led the movement of an independent state for Muslims in the subcontinent as they saw a decrease in their share of jobs in pre-partition India, which finally resulted in the creation of Pakistan in 1947. Hamza Alavi also believed that the Khilafat movement of the 1920s encouraged and strengthened the consciousness of Muslim identity, old Two-nation theory of Sir Syed Ahmed Khan and later the Pakistan movement, which caused the emerging assertiveness of Muslims in British India. His research papers explain his opinion as to how the transition from feudalism to colonial capitalism took place in South Asia. He used the concept of "Colonial Mode of Production" in Indian agriculture, which is different from feudal and capitalist mode.

== Death ==
Hamza Alavi died on 1 December 2003 at age 82. His wife had already died before his own death in 2003. They together had no children. After he spent a long time overseas as a political activist, he finally returned to his ancestral home in Karachi, Pakistan in 1997.

== Selected publications ==
His publications include:

- Jagirdari Aur Samraaj and Pakistan, Fiction House, Lahore, Pakistan (in Urdu language)
- Takhleeq-e-Pakistan, Fiction House, Lahore, Pakistan (in Urdu language)
- Pakistan Ek Riasat ka Bohraan, Fiction House Lahore, Pakistan (in Urdu language)
- Alavi, Hamza (1965) Peasant and Revolution, Socialist Register, pp. 241–77
- Alvi, Hamza & Shanin, Teodor (1982) Introduction to the Sociology of "Developing Societies", Monthly Review Press
- Alavi, H. (1982). Capitalism and colonial production. London: Croom Helm.
- Alvi, H., & Harriss, J. (1989). South Asia. New York: Monthly Review Press.
- Alvi, H., & Harriss, J. (1989). Sociology of 'developing societies': South Asia. Basingstoke: Macmillan Education.
- Halliday, Fred & Alavi, Hamza (1988) State and Ideology in the Middle East and Pakistan, Monthly Review Press
