= Federal Service for Supervision in Education and Science =

- Федеральная служба по надзору в сфере образования и науки (Рособрнадзор)
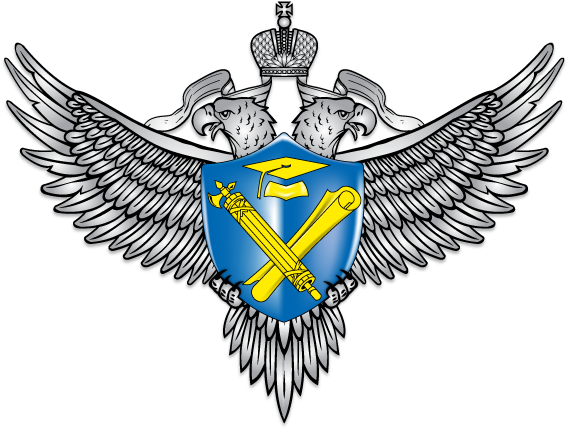
- Emblem of the Federal Service for Supervision in Education and Science

Agency overview
- Formed: 2004; 22 years ago
- Jurisdiction: Russian Federation
- Headquarters: Sadovaya-Sukharevskaya st., 16, Moscow, Russian Federation, 127994
- Agency executive: Anzor Muzayev, Director
- Parent department: Government of the Russian Federation
- Website: obrnadzor.gov.ru

The Federal Service for Supervision in Education and Science (Rosobrnadzor; Russian: Федеральная служба по надзору в сфере образования и науки (Рособрнадзор), romanized: Federal'naya sluzhba po nadzoru v sfere obrazovaniya i nauki) is a Russian federal agency tasked with the supervision and control of national education and science. It was formed in 2004 and is an independent agency that functions as part of the Government of the Russian Federation.

== Functions ==
The scope of activities of Rosobrnadzor are:

- Licensing and state accreditation of educational activities.
- Certification of scientific and pedagogical workers of institutions of higher professional education.
- Certification of graduates of educational institutions.
- Confirmation and nostrification of education documents.
- Conducting a unified state exam.
- Maintenance of the Federal Register of state documents on education, on academic degrees and academic titles.

== Directors of the Federal Service ==
1. Viktor Bolotov headed Rosobrnadzor from March 2004, was relieved of his post on March 28, 2008 by order of the Chairman of the Government of the Russian Federation V. A. Zubkov “in connection with the transfer to another job” (order No. 395-r of March 28, 2008). Doctor of Pedagogical Sciences, Academician of the Russian Academy of Education.
2. Lyubov Glebova was appointed head of the service on March 28, 2008 (order No. 396-r dated March 28, 2008), left the post on November 1, 2012 in connection with the transfer to the position of a member of the Federation Council from the Penza region. Doctor of Pedagogical Sciences, Corresponding Member of the Russian Academy of Education.
3. Ivan Muravyov was appointed head of Rosobrnadzor from November 3, 2012, previously was deputy of Lyubov Glebova. Released from office by order of the Chairman of the Government of the Russian Federation D. A. Medvedev on July 31, 2013. PhD in Law.
4. Sergey Kravtsov (politician) was appointed head of department on August 1, 2013 . Doctor of Pedagogical Sciences. On January 21, 2020, he left his position due to the transition to the post of Minister of Education of the Russian Federation.
5. Anzor Muzayev was appointed as head of department on August 18, 2020; has been acting since February 13, 2020. Candidate of Technical Sciences.

== Institutions under the jurisdiction of the Rosobrnadzor ==
- FGBNU "Federal Institute of Pedagogical Measurements" (Official site)
- FSBI "Federal Testing Center"
- National Information Center for the Recognition of Education "GlavExpertCenter" (Official site)
- National accreditation agency in the field of education (Rosakkredaghenstvo) (Official site)
- Information and Methodological Center for Certification of Educational Organizations
- FSBI "Federal Institute for Education Quality Assessment" (Official site)

== Criticism ==
Scientists from the European University at Saint Petersburg noticed that Rosobrnadzor inspects private universities more often and more often applies harsh sanctions to them compared to public institutions. In 2015-2016, after inspections, the service in 134 cases raised the issue of terminating the work of universities, while only two cases occurred in budgetary institutions. Journalists explained this by the use of double standards.

Director of Research at the Institute for Law Enforcement Problems at the European University at St. Petersburg K. D. Titaev, in an interview with the Internet publication "Indicator", speaking about the launch of a research project on the activities of Rosobrnadzor, noted a number of already identified significant shortcomings in the approach of Rosobrnadzor, mainly related to focusing exclusively on paper indicators and an excessive bureaucratic approach. As an example of the incompetence of the department, Titaev cited one of the full-time universities known to him with an area of 200 square meters, in which four courses of students study on paper in three areas, while there are about 100 students per course. Instead of actual training, as Titaev suggests, in this case, in such an area, only the purchase of a diploma for four years can take place, but “Rosobrnadzor, who goes there once a year or several years, sees that everything is in order. Without any bribes. Documentary support for people is at the highest level, everything is fine.” Titaev also points out that most of the employees of Rosobrnadzor are lawyers who are incompetent in matters of many special disciplines, and that in Rosobrnadzor “it is technically impossible to order an examination of a lecture on curriculum only. Therefore, if we assume that a medical university will teach students to heal, calling it “modern methods of therapy” in the curriculum, then Rosobrnadzor does not have the opportunity to find out what students are actually taught” Titaev believes.

The decision of Rosobrnadzor to revoke the state accreditation of the Moscow School for the Social and Economic Sciences(MSSES) provoked public criticism. The HSE University Academic Council came out in support of the university. According to the academic council, the university verification system played a role when Rosobrnadzor fought against the “deliberately profanity programs” of unscrupulous universities. However, now that this work has come to an end, traditional accreditation as a tool increasingly affects innovative universities that operate “above the level of state standards”. Commenting on this situation, Oleg Smolin, Deputy Chairman of the State Duma Committee on Education and Science, expressed the opinion that “Rosobrnadzor does not check the quality of education, but the quality of paperwork. According to its rules, it acts correctly, it is another matter that these rules have nothing to do with the quality of education. Therefore, in my opinion, these rules need to be changed”. MSSES students published a petition demanding to close the department.
