= Dictema =

Unit of a text

Dictema (Latin: dico, dixi, dictum – "I say, I state") is an elementary situational-thematic unit of a text, formed of one or more sentences as units of the immediately lower level of language segments.

== History of creation ==
The concept of the dictema was put forward by Mark Bloch in the mid-twentieth century in connection with a scientific discussion on the communicative units of language as described by Ferdinand de Saussure of the Geneva School, as well as Professor Alexander Smirnitsky. In turn, Professor Bloch considered the level of language units that had gone unnoticed, namely the levels of the phoneme and morpheme, to which he added the "third integral level of constructions with blurred boundaries" – syntax. Thus, following the creation of morphology by Dionysius Thrax and syntax by Apollonius Dyscolus, the isolation of the dictema represents another key stage in the history of grammar.

== Structure ==
In a uniformly unfolding monologic written text, the dictema is usually represented by a paragraph, whereas in dialogical speech, the dictema is usually represented by a rejoinder.

As an integrative unit of linguistic expression, the dictema distinguishes four main functionally significant aspects: naming, predication, thematization and stylization.

== See also ==
- Morphology
- Syntax
