= Grigory Yudin =

Russian sociologist

- Григорий Юдин
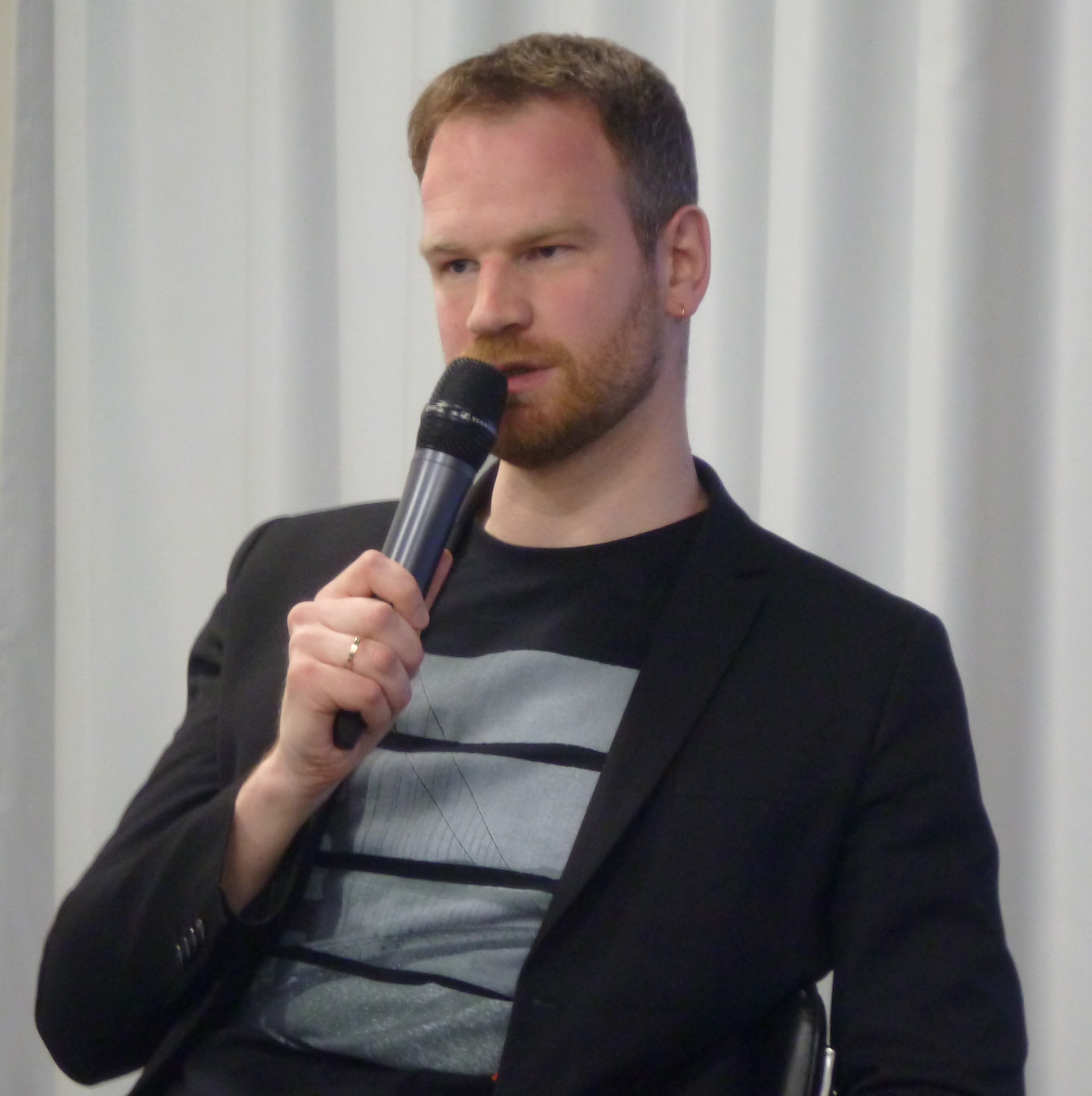
- Yudin in 2019
- Born: Grigory Borisovich Yudin; August 10, 1983 (age 42); Fryazino, Moscow Oblast, Russian SFSR, Soviet Union
- Education: Higher School of Economics; University of Manchester; The New School
- Alma mater: Higher School of Economics
- Occupations: Sociologist, columnist
- Known for: Specialist in the theory of democracy and economic anthropology
- Scientific career
- Fields: Sociology, political science, philosophy
- Institutions: Higher School of Economics; Moscow School for the Social and Economic Sciences

Grigory Borisovich Yudin, also known as Greg Yudin (born 1983), is a Russian political scientist and sociologist. Yudin is an expert in public opinion and polling in Russia. He is columnist for the newspaper Vedomosti and the online magazine Republic, as well as the website Proekt. He has also written for Open Democracy.

== Life ==
Yudin gained his BA and MA in sociology at the Higher School of Economics, Moscow. In 2012, he received a PhD in anthropology from the University of Manchester. He is a Senior Researcher in the Laboratory for Studies in Economic Sociology at the Higher School of Economics, and heads Russia's first MA program in political philosophy at the Moscow School for the Social and Economic Sciences.

In early 2022, Yudin warned of a lack of political awareness amongst the Russian population about the Russo-Ukrainian crisis. On 22 February 2022, Yudin predicted that Putin was "about to start the most senseless war in history". After participating in protest against the Russian invasion of Ukraine on 24 February 2022, he was beaten unconscious by police and needed treatment at the Sklifosovsky Institute in central Moscow.

In 2023-2024 Yudin is visiting research scholar at the University Center for Human Values at the University of Princeton. He is also studying at The New School for Social Research in New York to obtain a PhD in politics.

In 2024, Yudin joined other Russian academics living abroad, including Evgeny Roshchin and Artemy Magun, in creating the Institute for Global Reconstitution, a group proposing a reformed constitution for Russia in the event that the Putin regime collapses. The proposal, for a Union of Republics of Russia, prompted debate among the Russian opposition on the future for a post-Putin Russia.

== Works ==
- (with Ivan Pavlyutkin) "Recording the ambiguity: The moral economy of debt books in a Russian small town". Cultural Studies. 29 (5–6): 807–826. 2015. doi:10.1080/09502386.2015.1017145. S2CID 154335216.
- Yudin, Greg (2016). "Sociology as a naïve science: Alfred Schütz and the phenomenological theory of attitudes". Human Studies. 39 (4): 547–568. doi:10.1007/s10746-016-9401-9. S2CID 146951744.
- "Governing Through Polls: Politics of Representation and Presidential Support in Putin's Russia". Javnost / The Public. 27 (1): 1–15. 2020.
- "Why is Putin's Russia threatening Ukraine?". Open Democracy. 19 January 2022.
