= Viktor Vakhstayn =

Russian sociologist (born 1981)

- Виктор Вахштайн
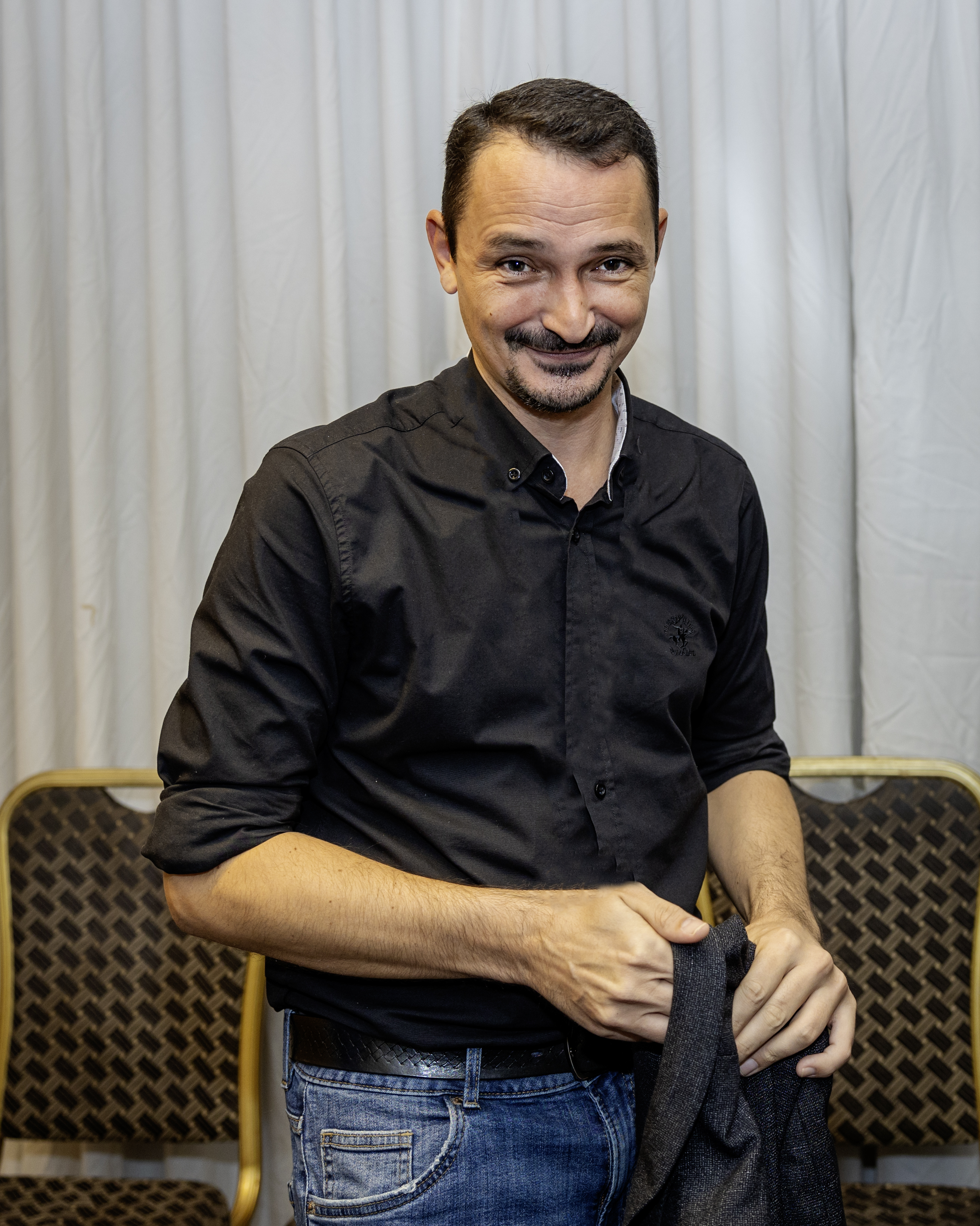
- Vakhstayn in 2023
- Born: Viktor Semyonovich Vakhstayn; January 23, 1981 (age 45); Penza, Russian SFSR, Soviet Union
- Education: Penza State University; Moscow School for the Social and Economic Sciences; University of Manchester; Higher School of Economics
- Occupation: Sociologist

Viktor Semyonovich Vakhstayn (also spelled Vakhshtayn; Russian: Виктор Семёнович Вахштайн; born 23 January 1981) is a Russian-Israeli sociologist specializing in social theory, microsociology, and actor–network theory. He currently serves as a research fellow at the Ariel University and the Center for Russian Studies of the Tel Aviv University.

== Biography ==
Vakhstayn was born on January 23, 1981, in Penza, Soviet Union.

In 2002 he graduated from the Faculty of Psychology of the V. G. Belinsky Penza State Pedagogical University (now Penza State University) and moved to Moscow, where he received a master's degree in sociology at MSSES in 2003. In the same year, he graduated from the same programme at the University of Manchester. In 2007, he graduated from graduate school of the Higher School of Economics and obtained a Candidate of Sciences (Ph.D) degree in sociology by defending a thesis on "Framing Theory as a Method for Sociological Analysis of Everyday Life".

Since 2011, he has served as the Dean of the Faculty of Social Studies at the Moscow School for the Social and Economic Sciences, Dean of the Faculty of Philosophy and Sociology and Head of the Department of Theoretical Sociology and Epistemology at the Russian Presidential Academy of National Economy and Public Administration.

According to Radio Free Europe/Radio Liberty, Vakhstayn has migrated to Israel before the start of the Russian invasion of Ukraine.

On 22 April 2022, Russian Ministry of Justice included Vakhstayn in its "foreign agents" list.
