= Jean-Louis Fabiani =

French sociologist

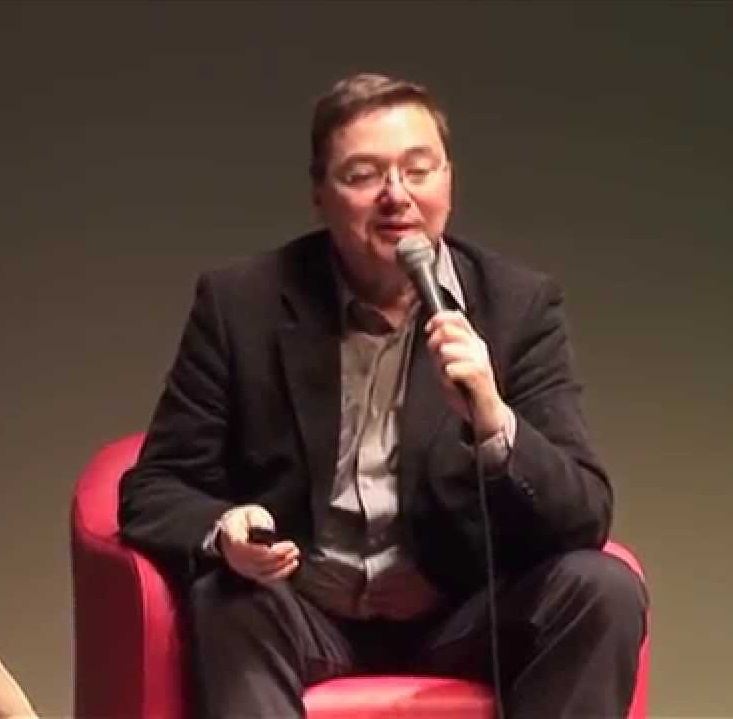
- Jean-Louis Fabiani speaking at the Colloque Culture et Démocratie, January 2014
- Born: May 30, 1951 (age 75); Algiers, French Algeria

Academic background
- Education: Ph.D.
- Alma mater: École des hautes études en sciences sociales
- Thesis: La Crise du champ philosophique, 1880-1914: contribution à l'histoire sociale du systèmé d'enseignement (1980)
- Doctoral advisor: Pierre Bourdieu

Academic work
- Discipline: Sociologist
- Sub-discipline: Sociology of culture, Social theory
- Institutions: Central European University, École des hautes études en sciences sociales
- Notable works: Les philosophes de la République (1998)

Jean-Louis Fabiani (born May 30, 1951) is a French sociologist, professor of sociology and social anthropology at the Central European University, and the director of studies at the Centre d'études sociologiques et politiques Raymond Aron at the École des Hautes Études en Sciences Sociales.

== Education ==
Fabiani aggregated in philosophy at the École Normale Supérieure in 1974 before graduating with his PhD in 1980 at the École des hautes études en sciences sociales under the supervision of Pierre Bourdieu.

== Work ==
Fabiani's research has addressed the study of what he calls "configurations of knowledge" understood as the ways in which disciplines and scientific institutions are built and how they change. This problem was the subject of his book Les philosophes de la République (1998) published by Les Éditions de Minuit in the collection "Sens commun" (compiled by Pierre Bourdieu).

From 1988 to 1991, Fabiani was the director of regional cultural affairs in Corsica. In January 2015, Fabiani was appointed by Fleur Pellerin as an Officier des arts et lettres in recognition for his “significant contributions to the arts and literature” of France.

== Teaching ==
Fabiani is presently a senior professor at the Central European University in the department of sociology and social anthropology, a position he has held since 2011, as well as full professor and director of studies at the École des hautes études en sciences sociales. In 2014, Fabiani was the Fernand Braudel Fellow at the European University Institute in the department of history and civilization.

Fabiani has held several visiting professorships, most notably at the sociology departments of the University of California, San Diego, the University of Chicago, the Université de Montréal and the University of Michigan.

== Bibliography ==
Books in French

- Fabiani, Jean-Louis (1988). Les philosophes de la République. Sens commun. Paris: Les Éditions de Minuit. ISBN 978-2707311627.
- Fabiani, Jean-Louis; Rigot, Huguette; Fabienne, Soldini (1995). Lire en prison. Une étude sociologique. Paris: Bibliothèque Publique d'Information (BPI) du Centre Pompidou. ISBN 2-902706-94-4.
- Fabiani, Jean-Louis (2005). Beautés du Sud: La Provence à l'épreuve des jugements de goût. Paris: L’Harmattan. ISBN 9782747597258.
- Fabiani, Jean-Louis (2007). Après la culture légitime : Objets, publics, autorités. Paris: L’Harmattan. ISBN 9782296036987.
- L'Education populaire et le théâtre : Le public d'Avignon en action (Presses universitaires de Grenoble, 2008 ISBN 978-2706114564
- Qu'est-ce qu'un philosophe français? : La vie sociale des concepts (1880-1980) (Editions de l'Ecole des Hautes Etudes en Sciences Sociales, 2010) ISBN 978-2713222672
- La sociologie comme elle s'écrit : De Bourdieu à Latour (Editions de l'Ecole des Hautes Etudes en Sciences Sociales, 2015) ISBN 978-2713224904
- Pierre Bourdieu. Un structuralisme héroïque (Seuil, 2016) ISBN 978-2021290325

Books in English

- Pierre Bourdieu: A Heroic Structuralism (Brill, 2020) ISBN 978-9004426542

Selected Articles in English

- "The audience and its legend: A sociological analysis of the Avignon festival." The Journal of Arts Management, Law, and Society 32, no. 4 (2003): 265–277.
- "Should the sociological analysis of art festivals be Neo-Durkheimian?" Durkheimian Studies/Etudes durkheimiennes 11 (2005): 49–66.
- "R. K. Merton in France: Foucault, Bourdieu, Latour and the invention of mainstream sociology in Paris," in Concepts and the social order: Robert K. Merton and the future of sociology edited by Yehuda Elkana, András Szi-guetti and Gyorgy Lissauer. Budapest-New York: CEU University Press, 2011.
