= Sergey Zuev (economist) =

- Born: Sergey Eduardovich Zuev; 25 April 1954 (age 71); Moscow, RSFSR, Soviet Union
- Occupations: economist, art critic, philologist, manager
- Spouse: Elizaveta Fokina
- Awards: Medal of the Order "For Merit to the Fatherland" II class (2014); Order of Honour (2020)

Sergey Eduardovich Zuev (Russian: Сергей Эдуардович Зуев; born April 25, 1954) is a Russian economist, specialist in cultural management, candidate of art history (1984), professor, since 2011 Rector of the Moscow School for the Social and Economic Sciences (MSSES), Director of the Institute of Social Sciences of RANEPA.

Zuev was detained in October 2021 on embezzlement charges under Marina Rakova Case, which his supporters say are politically-motivated.

== Biography ==
=== Area of Professional Interest ===
Strategies of regional development, project management, applied socio-cultural research.

=== Early years and education ===
Sergey was born on April 25, 1954, in Moscow. In 1971 he entered the Military University of Russian Ministry of Defense at the Chinese studies department. After two years he switched to the MSU Philology department, graduated in 1978 and in 1984 defended his thesis and obtained a Ph.D. in History of Arts.

=== Career ===
In the 1980s Zuev worked at the Russian State University of Art History as a researcher in sociology. In 1989 he headed the School of Cultural Politics, in 1994 he became Director of the Cultural Technologies Center. In 1998 he became Dean of the Cultural Management department at Moscow School for the Social and Economic Sciences (MSSES). In 2000-01 he was Vice Chair of the ‘Strategic Research Centre’ initiative .

In 2005-2010 he was in charge of several expert groups that developed regional development strategies for such regions as Astrakhan Oblast, Karelia, Kaliningrad Oblast, Kaluga Oblast, Smolensk Oblast, and Buryatia. In 2011-12 he headed the ‘Socio-Economical Development of Moscow 2025’ programm.

In 2011 Zuev was elected Rector of the Moscow School for the Social and Economic Sciences. In the same year, he became Director of the Institute of Social Sciences of RANEPA. In RENEPA, he launched a ‘Master of public administration’ course.

Since 1991, Zuev has read more than 150 seminars on regional and urban development, and has contributed to more than 17 governmental development programs. Zuev has numerous publications in scientific journals.

==== Detention ====
On October 13, 2021, Zuev was detained and questioned as a suspect in Marina Rakova Case, a former Deputy Education Minister who had been accused of alleged stealing 50 mln roubles of state money meant for the educational program at MSSES under the direction of Zuev. On October 13, Zuev was charged with embezzling roughly 21 mln roubles. Zuev denied any wrongdoing. On October 20, he was hospitalized with hypertensive emergency and had heart surgery soon afterwards. On November 9, Zuev was put into a detention center by court decision following the General Prosecutor's request. On December 3, Zuev collapsed in court, an ambulance was called but refused to hospitalize him. Despite his health conditions, Zuev was kept in a detention facility. Medical specialists weren’t allowed to visit him, he was also denied transfer to a hospital. His arrest was prolonged until March 7, 2022.

In December 2021 at the annual meeting with the Presidential Council for Civil Society and Human Rights, Vladimir Putin was asked about Zuev and reacted that ‘there was no reason to keep him behind bars’. After that the defense requested his transfer under house arrest again, but with no success

As discovered by journalists of Forbes, the expert evaluation of MSSES contracts was made by the police even before the affected party filed a report.

As stated by Alexander Khiridgy, a member of the Public Monitoring Commission, by February 2022 Zuev's health had deteriorated so much that he no longer could stand up from the bed. No contacts with the relatives were allowed. No investigation acts were carried out during the detention time. On April 3, Zuev's family paid 6 mln roubles as a partial compensation of the sum he allegedly embezzled. As explained by the lawyers, it was done in a hope that Zuev could be moved from the detention center under house arrest. Still, the court prolonged the arrest until June 5, 2022.

On June 7, 2022, Marina Rakova pleaded guilty and testified against Vladimir Mau. She also offered to compensate all incriminated damage. On August 3, the court changed Zuev's measure of restraint from jail to house arrest. Still, he was denied walk time that he asked for to use for medical visits. By August 22, when the prosecution announced the completion of the investigation, Mau was the only accused in the case who denied any wrongdoing. Only on November 3, 2022, the court agreed to change Zuev's measure of restraint from house arrest to prohibition of certain actions.

==== Sentence ====
On 19 March 2024, the court found Zuev guilty of large-scale fraud and sentenced him to a 4-year suspended prison term.

== Family ==
Zuev is married to Elizaveta Fokina; he has four children. When he was arrested, Zuev's daughter from the first marriage conducted a one-man picket being 9 months pregnant.
