= Center for Strategic Research (Russia) =

Russian public policy think tank

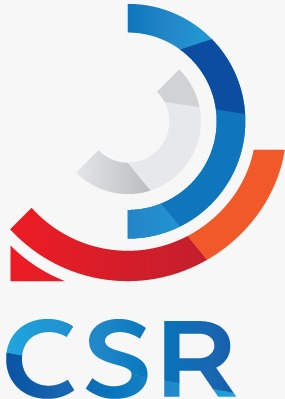
- Abbreviation: CSR
- Formation: 1999; 26 years ago
- Type: Public policy think tank
- Headquarters: 3-5 bld. 1, Gazetny lane
- Location: Moscow, Russia, 125009
- Chairman of the Board: Maxim Reshetnikov
- President: Vladislav Onishchenko
- Website: www.csr.ru

The Center for Strategic Research (Russian: Центр стратегических разработок), or CSR (Russian: ЦСР), is a Russian public policy think tank based in Moscow, Russia. The Center for Strategic Research (CSR) is a non-commercial organization that plays key role in elaboration and implementation of long-term development strategy of Russia's economy. CSR was established in December 1999.

== Operation ==
Among key objectives, CSR assumes monitoring and comprehensive analysis of socio-economic development indicators. The Foundation uses its own information and analysis tools, that are managed by experts of 18 areas of competences (the list will be extended) and cooperates with federal and regional authorities, Russian and foreign companies, representatives of expert communities and consultants.

== Areas of Competences of CSR ==
Center for socio-economic research

Center for regional economy research

Center for regulatory policy

Center for economic analysis and forecasting

Center for investment analysis and macroeconomic research

Center for climate and green energy

Spatial development

Economy of the fuel and energy sector

Economy and social development

Economy of the non-raw-materials sector

Economy of infrastructure industries

Digital development

Economy of monopolies

Contract management

Institute for the development of the multifunctional center (MFC)

Strategic communications

Legislative development

Fiscal policy

== CSR Senior Management (since the establishment of the Center) ==
Herman Gref (1999-2011), President and Chairman of the Executive Board of Sberbank

Vladimir Mau (2011-2014), Rector and Chairman of Academic Council of the Russian Presidential Academy of National Economy and Public Administration (RANEPA)

Alexei Kudrin (2016-2018), Head of the Accounts Chamber of the Russian Federation

Maxim Oreshkin (2018-2020), Adviser to the President of Russia

Maxim Reshetnikov (2020 – till present), Minister of Economic Development of the Russian Federation

== CSR Presidents (periods with current posts) ==
Dmitry Mezentsev (1999-2002), State Secretary of the Union State of Russia and Belarus

Nikolai Petrov (2002-2004), acting President of CSR

Elvira Nabiullina (2003-2005), Chairwoman of the Central Bank of Russia

Mikhail Dmitriev (2005-2014), in the past – First Deputy Minister of Economic Development and Trade of the Russian Federation

Vladimir Knyaginin (2014-2016), Vice Governor of Saint Petersburg

Pavel Kadochnikov (2016-2018), Deputy Minister of Finance of Russia

Alexander Sinitsyn (2018-2020), Head of Tinkov Family Foundation

Vladislav Onishenko (2020 – till present)

== CSR Board ==
Maxim Reshetnikov, Minister of Economic Development of the Russian Federation, Chairman of the CSR Board

Dmitry Mezentsev, State Secretary of the Union State of Russia and Belarus, Deputy Chairman of the CSR Board

Yaroslav Kuzminov, Academic Supervisor of National Research University – Higher School of Economics (HSE)

Oleg Vyugin, Chairman of the Supervisory Board of Moscow Exchange

Vladimir Mau, Rector and Chairman of Academic Council of the Russian Presidential Academy of National Economy and Public Administration (RANEPA)

Evgeny Yasin, Doctor of Sciences in Economics, Professor

Evgeny Gavrilenkov, Doctor of Sciences in Economics, Professor at the National Research University – Higher School of Economics (HSE)

Marat Uzyakov, Deputy Director of the Institute of Economic Forecasting of the Russian Academy of Sciences (IEF RAS)

Taliya Habrieva, Member of the Russian President's Council for Countering Corruption

== CSR Top-Management ==
Vladislav Onishchenko, President of CSR

Tatyana Gorovaya, Senior Vice-President of CSR

Gleb Pokatovich, Senior Vice-President of CSR

Tatyana Radchenko, Senior Vice-President of CSR

Mikhail Rasstrigin, Senior Vice-President of CSR
