= Moscow School for the Social and Economic Sciences =

Moscow School of Social and Economic Sciences
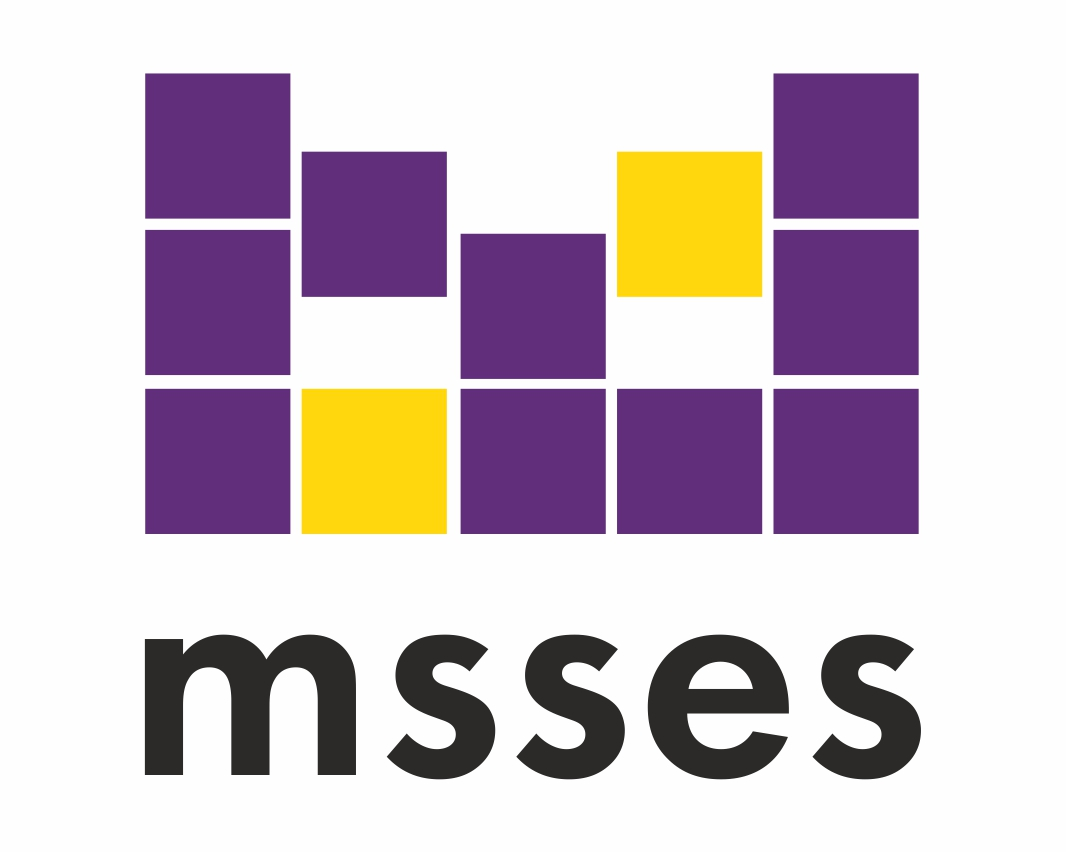
- Nickname: SHANINKA
- Founded: 1995; 31 years ago
- Founder: Teodor Shanin
- Type: University
- Purpose: Law, Economic, Humanities
- Location: Moscow, Russia, Gazetnyy Lane, 3-5
- Region served: Russia
- Rector: Maria Sigova
- Website: msses.ru

The Moscow School of Social and Economic Sciences (Shaninka) (Russian: Московская высшая школа социальных и экономических наук) is a non-state university founded in 1995 by Teodor Shanin, a sociologist, peasant studies researcher, historian and professor at the University of Manchester. Since 2011, the rector of MSSES has been Sergey Zuev.

MSSES comprises eight departments delivering 35 programmes at bachelor's, master's and professional retraining levels. The school enrols approximately 1,000 students each year. The average admission score for undergraduate programmes is 80.6. MSSES ranks sixth among public and private universities in the quality of the admission process for fee-based programmes.

== History ==
The origins of MSSES lie in the period between 1989 and 1991, when Teodor Shanin, then Professor of Sociology at the University of Manchester, invited the future leading figures of Russian sociology to take part in three-month sociological field schools in Manchester and at the University of Kent at Canterbury, which he had organised. A few years later, he established the Interdisciplinary Academic Centre for Social Sciences (InterCentre), which comprised two departments: one for the study of the social structure of Russian society, and the other for Peasant Studies and Agricultural Reforms. At that time, Shanin collaborated with researchers such as Tatyana Zaslavskaya, Yuri Levada, Vadim Radaev, Oleg Kharkhordin, Vadim Volkov and Gennady Batygin.

In the early 1990s, Shanin recognised that the social sciences were poorly represented in Russia in comparison with engineering disciplines, and he resolved to establish several universities in Moscow on the basis of international collaboration. His principal aim was to transform the outdated Soviet model of education by introducing Western practices that would afford students opportunities for self-education and independent thought. Shanin secured the support of the British Council and the Soros Foundation to implement his ideas. The Ministry of Education granted permission solely for a Russian-British university but failed to fulfil the initial agreement, and Shanin was obliged to seek the assistance of Abel Aganbegyan, the rector of the Academy of National Economy. Aganbegyan helped to establish the new university on the premises of the academy.

In 2002, Teodor Shanin received the Order of the British Empire for "services to education in Russia".

The present logo of MSSES was introduced in 2012 and incorporated the name "Shaninka" as its essential element. At that time, MSSES offered only postgraduate programmes. The first undergraduate programme, Creative Project Management and Global Politics, was presented only in 2014, but many others followed over the subsequent years.

In 2018, Rosobrnadzor revoked Shaninka's accreditation. The school retained its educational licence, which meant that it was still authorised to provide educational services but could no longer grant state-recognised degrees. This episode galvanised a broad community of supporters for the school, including many graduates, academics and public figures. On 3 March 2020, the accreditation expert panel gave a favourable review of all MSSES programmes, and Rosobrnadzor acknowledged their compliance with the Federal State Educational Standards. This occurred one month after the school's founder, Teodor Shanin, died on 4 February 2020.

Throughout this period, MSSES maintained its educational activities and international collaborations. In 2019, two new partnerships were announced: the first with the University of Turin (Italy) for a double-degree PhD programme in Law, and the second with Coventry University, which also participated in the establishment of several double-diploma programmes.

In 2021, Shaninka became a co-founder of the New University League, alongside the European University at Saint Petersburg, the New Economic School, and the Skolkovo Institute of Science and Technology.

== Campus ==
The campus of MSSES is located in the centre of Moscow, on 3-5 Gazetnyy lane. Until 2018, Shaninka was located in the Southwest of Moscow on Vernadskiy Avenue.

=== Library ===
Even before Shaninka acquired its own building, the gem of the school was its library designed by the English architect Dudley Yeo and supplied by efforts of the Liverpool School of Academic Librarians that selected 20 000 books in English at Shanin's request. Shanin valued the library more than any other school facility, so the official opening of MSSES was postponed until September 9, 1995 when the Library was ready for students.

The first director of the Library was Ian Bain, who left Scotland at Shanin's request. After two years of diligent work, he formed a perfect running structure and left to establish a new library in Singapore. At the time Shaninka was established, the collection of books was unique and one of its kind in Russia. The library gained Internet access in 1996, and the school presented a special course called Library & Computer Skills.

The library moved to Gazetnyy lane on December 3, 2018. The architect of the renewed Library became Nicholas Champkins, while Alisa Mozharova designed the space. Due to its unique design in trademark Shaninka purple and yellow colours, the Library became a landmark, so it offers excursions for non-student visitors.

Along with the friendly space for study and various community activities, the Library provides an inclusive environment and supports recycling initiatives.

== Faculties ==
=== Faculty of Law ===
The Faculty of Law was established in 1995 and became one of the first three faculties of MSSES. The faculty delivers the following degrees:

- Bachelor's Programme ‘European Private Law Tradition’
- Master's Programme ‘Comparative and International Private Law’;
- Professional Retraining Programme ‘Legal Studies’;
- Master's Programme ‘Legal Advice for Asset Management’;

The current dean of the faculty is Anton Selivanovsky.

=== Faculty of Social and Cultural Project Management ===
The Faculty of Social and Cultural Project Management was established in 1998 by the initiative of the former rector of MSSES Sergey Zuev. At the time, the University of Manchester, like many other British universities, did not have a faculty of cultural management, so first programs of the faculty were validated by the University of Aberdeen. When the Cultural Management discipline was launched in Manchester, the training program was further validated by the University of Manchester.

The faculty delivers the following degrees:

- Bachelor's Programme ‘Creative Projects Management’;
- Master's Programme ‘Project Management’;
- Master's Programme ‘Cultural Heritage Management’.
- Professional Retraining Programme ‘Management of Institutions and Projects in Cultural Industries'.

The current Dean of the faculty is Olga Karpova.

=== Faculty of Practical Psychology ===
The Faculty of Practical Psychology was established in 1995 as the Faculty of Social Management and Social work, the first one in Russia. In order to comply with the British educational standards, the group of the future teachers of the faculty was sent to the London School of Economics to study the didactic methods applied in the UK. In the middle of the 2000s, educational programs were substantially revised which resulted in the faculty reorganisation and it was renamed the Faculty of Practical Psychology.

The faculty delivers the following degrees:

- Bachelor's Programme ‘Psychological Counselling and Coaching’;
- Master's Programme ‘Psychological Counselling’;
- Professional Retraining Programme ‘Practical Psychology’;
- Professional Retraining Programme ‘The Psychology and Economics of Decisions in Management’;
- Professional Development Programme 'Solution Focused Brief Therapy'.

The current dean of the faculty is Evgeniy Morgunov.

=== Faculty of Social Studies ===
The Faculty of Social Studies was established in 1995 among the first three faculties of MSSES. Since 2012, it has been holding autumn field schools for students. Those schools have become part of the faculty's education process. The faculty delivers the following degrees:

Sociology Programmes:

- Bachelor's Programme ‘Contemporary Social Theory’;
- Master's Programme ‘Fundamental Sociology’.
- Professional Retraining Programme ‘Fundamental Sociology’;

History Programmes:

- Master's Programme ‘History of Russian Modernization’.

The current dean of the faculty is Irina Dudenkova.

=== Faculty of Educational Management ===
The faculty's primary goal is to promote the modernisation of the Russian education system. That can be achieved by training specialists in key educational fields, particularly in the field of education policy. The faculty's objective is to form a cohort of highly qualified analysts and experts capable of analysing and shaping educational policies in their regions and the country at large.

In 2019, the faculty launched a Center for Educational Policy Studies, which joined an international network of similar centres in 19 countries across the globe.

Currently, the Faculty delivers two professional retraining programs and a UK Master's degree program: "Data-Driven Education Systems Management" and "Management of Preschool Education and Early Childhood Development".

The current head of the faculty is Elena Fedorenko.

=== Faculty of Liberal Arts and Sciences ===
The Faculty of Liberal Arts and Sciences was established in 2021. It offers the Liberal Arts & Sciences learning model, which allows second-year students to choose one of five specialisations and form their own individual educational trajectory. The faculty offers the following educational programmes:

- Bachelor's Programme 'Cinema in modern society: Analytics and Production';
- Bachelor's Programme 'Modern media';
- Bachelor's Programme 'Educational Projects: Management and Entrepreneurship';
- Bachelor's Programme 'Philosophy. Politics. Economics';
- Bachelor's Programme 'Public Policy and Project Management';
- Professional Retraining Programme 'Political Philosophy';

The current head of the faculty is Roman Konchakov.

=== Interfaculty Department of English Language ===
The Interfaculty Department of English Language (IDEL) allows students to reach the English proficiency level required for studying in a British university and provides academic support for core curricula by helping students develop skills of academic writing, working with data sources in English, conducting discussions, preparing presentations, participating in seminars, etc. The programme’s teachers communicate with students only in English, which ensures complete immersion in the language.

The current head of the department is Irina Korotkina.

== Notable people ==
- Maria Sigova, Russian economist, professor, current rector of MSSES. She replaced Zuev in March 2023.
- Sergey Zuev, Russian economist, specialist in cultural management, candidate of art history (1984), professor, former rector of MSSES. Zuev was detained in October 2021 on embezzlement charges under Marina Rakova Case, which his supporters say are politically motivated.
- Viktor Vakhstayn, Russian sociologist, specialist in social theory and microsociology, the dean of the Faculty of Social Studies of MSSES. On April 22, 2022, Viktor Vakhshtayn was included into the list of foreign agents by the Russian Ministry of Justice.
- Grigory Yudin, Russian political scientist and sociologist, a professor of the Faculty of Political Science. Yudin is an expert in public opinion and polling in Russia.
- Ekaterina Schulmann, Russian political scientist specialising in legislative processes, a former associate professor of MSSES. On April 16, 2022, she was included into the list of foreign agents by the Russian Ministry of Justice.
- Boris Kagarlitsky, Russian Marxist theoretician and sociologist, teaches political science and international relations in MSSES. On May 6, 2022, he was included into the list of foreign agents by the Russian Ministry of Justice
- Yuri Slezkine, Russian-born American historian and translator. He is a professor of Russian history, Sovietologist, and director of the Institute of Slavic, East European, and Eurasian Studies at the University of California, Berkeley. The teacher of History of Soviet Civilization in MSSES.
- Alexander Bikbov, academic in the fields of sociology and political science. He earned a joint degree from the Moscow School of Social and Economic Sciences and the University of Manchester in 1997.

== Controversies ==
=== Over accreditation ===
On 20 June 2018, the Federal Service for Supervision in Education and Science (Rosobrnadzor) revoked the accreditation of the Moscow School of Social and Economic Sciences. The decision was criticised. The School noted that, "The withdrawal of accreditation does not mean revoking the license to conduct education", and vowed to continue its work. This sanction may have been unfair.

In March 2020, the accreditation of the university was restored.

In December 2025, Rosobrnadzor suspended the school's license again and accused it of lacking core higher education programs and qualified teaching staff, reporting poor student performance on standardized tests and failing to update employees' information on its website.
