= Mark Bloch (linguist) =

Russian linguist (1924–2022)

Mark Yakovlevich Bloch (Russian: Марк Яковлевич Блох; 16 August 1924 – 16 September 2022) was a Russian linguist and philologist. He was the author of a number of literary works under the literary pseudonym of Mark Lensky.

He was a professor, serving as head of the English language and grammar department of the Moscow Pedagogical State University, head of the foreign languages department of the Moscow Humanitarian and Technical Academy. He was an honorary professor of MPGU, an honorary academician of the Russian Academy of Natural Sciences and the International Academy of Sciences of Pedagogical Education, as well as a member of the Writers' Union of Russia, the Russian Union of Journalists, and the Russian Writers' Club of New York.

Bloch's main fields of research included English language theory, general, typological and German linguistics, translation theory, and linguodidactics. He wrote over 200 scientific works, including the monographs "Theoretical English Grammar" and "The Theoretical Bases of Grammar". Bloсh has also founded a scientific school of communicative-paradigmatic linguistics. Bloch introduced the concept of "dictema" into grammar as an elementary situational-thematic unit of the text.
