= Alice in Wonderland (2025 film) =

Russian musical film

- Алиса в Стране чудес
- Directed by: Yury Khmelnitsky
- Screenplay by: Karina Chuvikova
- Story by: Lewis Carroll
- Based on: Alice's Adventures in Wonderland by Lewis Carroll; Alice in Wonderland (Audio Concert 1976) by Vladimir Vysotsky
- Produced by: Ilya Burets; Maxim Filatov; Semyon Shcherbovich-Vecher; Irina Venediktova; Danila Sharapov; Tina Kandelaki; Arkady Vodakhov
- Starring: Anna Peresild; Oleg Savostyuk; Miloš Biković; Irina Gorbacheva; Paulina Andreeva; Andrey Fedortsov
- Cinematography: Andrey Ivanov
- Edited by: Anna Krutiy
- Music by: Vladislav Saratovkin
- Production companies: Mediaslovo; KION Film Studio; Gazprom-Media Holding; TNT; NRJ
- Distributed by: Central Partnership
- Release dates: October 21, 2025 (Karo 11 October); October 23, 2025 (Russia)
- Running time: 108 minutes
- Country: Russia
- Language: Russian
- Box office: ₽1 billion

Alice in Wonderland (Russian: Алиса в Стране чудес, romanized: Alisa v Strane chudes) is a 2025 Russian children's musical film directed by Yury Khmelnitsky, loosely based on the 1865 English novel of the same name by Lewis Carroll and the 1976 Soviet radio play by Vladimir Vysotsky.

Alice in Wonderland had its world premiere at the Karo 11 October at Arbat Square in Moscow on October 21, 2025, and was released in Russia on October 23, 2025 by Central Partnership.

== Plot ==
Alice, a 15-year-old Russian schoolgirl, fails her Basic State Exam maths exam, and the boy she likes gets into a fight. At home, her parents are arguing because of her. Heading to the park, Alice meets the White Rabbit who steals her watch. And then she finds herself in magical Wonderland, where the sun is always in zenith.

In this world, the schoolgirl sees many people who resemble her friends and family. However, they do not recognize her, for they are "antipodes". More importantly, she has entered a world where time has stopped, which only she can restart, which is something the cunning Duchess intends to exploit.

== Cast ==
- Anna Peresild as Alice Koroleva / Alice (also tr. Alisa Korolyova)
- Oleg Savostyuk as Kostya Dodolev / the Dodo
- Miloš Biković as Alice's father / the Hatter
- Irina Gorbacheva as Alice's mother / the Queen of Hearts
- Paulina Andreeva as Elena, Alice's school principal / the Duchess
- Andrey Fedortsov as a clock mascot costume handing out flyers / the White Rabbit
- Kristina Babushkina as Vera, Alice's class teacher / the Teacher
- Ilya Lykov as Alice's literature teacher / the Cheshire Cat
- Sergey Burunov as a laborer / the Caterpillar
- Polina Guchman as Vika Antonova, Alice's classmate / the Mouse
- Artyom Koshman as Andrei, a schoolboy / the Lory
- Kirill Mitrofanov as Alice's classmate / Billy
- Vasily Bobrov as Alice's classmate / Jimmy
- Alina Dotsenko as a street couple / the Dormouse (female)
- Yevgeny Buslakov as a street couple / the March Hare
- Anna Galinova as a woman walking her dog / the Cook

== Production ==
Alice in Wonderland is a modern adaptation of a children's audio play based on the poems of Vladimir Vysotsky, inspired by the Lewis Carroll fairy tale of the same name. The musical fairy tale was released in 1976 on two records. Vysotsky spent more than three years creating it.

The production of the fabulous film was carried out by the Mediaslovo company with the participation of Gazprom-Media Holding and the KION online cinema.

=== Casting ===
Alice Koroleva will be played by Anna Peresild, the daughter of actress Yulia Peresild and filmmaker Alexei Uchitel. She was remembered by viewers for her role as Aigul Akhmerova in the acclaimed TV series The Boy's Word: Blood on the Asphalt.

=== Filming ===
Principal photography began in September 2024, using large-scale sets at Mosfilm in Moscow, Sochi, with some locations in Abkhazia.

== Reception ==
=== Critical response ===
The film received mixed reviews. According to the review aggregator Kritikanstvo, the average score from Russian publications was 49 out of 100 (based on 15 reviews). It was praised by critics from Vokrug TV, heavily criticized by reviewers from Afisha, Gazeta.Ru, and Kommersant, while Arguments and Facts, Komsomolskaya Pravda, Nezavisimaya Gazeta, Novaya Gazeta, and Rossiyskaya Gazeta gave it average ratings.

In a review for Komsomolskaya Pravda, Denis Korsakov stated that "the authors' overarching goal was to out-Burton Burton, which is why Alice is stuffed with various wonders (the main attraction being a snow avalanche frozen on a mountainside that starts rushing downward as soon as Alice puts on a watch). There's also a multitude of characters that would have made Lewis Carroll simply grunt in disbelief".

Svyatoslav Letskiy, a reviewer for Championat.com, noted that "Alice in Wonderland is also a musical film. Key thoughts, unresolved problems, and character portrayals are primarily revealed through musical numbers".

Pavel Voronkov, a correspondent for Gazeta.Ru, pointed out that the film is an adaptation of a Soviet-era radio play by Oleg Gerasimov based on the story, featuring songs by Vladimir Vysotsky. He remarked that "only fragments remain of Gerasimov and Vysotsky's Alice. The transition from the highly abstract realm of sound to the screen — into an audiovisual environment striving for literalness — is inherently a harsh and merciless process, but the current epidemic of shoddy film fairy tales has completely ravaged the radio play".
