= OGE =

OGE or Oge may refer to:

- Basic State Exam, a standardized exam in Russia
- Oklahoma Gas & Electric
- United States Office of Government Ethics
- Out of Ground Effect, related to hovering a helicopter, see Ground effect in aircraft
- Oilthigh na Gàidhealtachd 's nan Eilean, Gaelic name of University of the Highlands and Islands
- The Ontario Global Edge Program, an international work placement program funded by the government of Ontario, Canada
- Ōge-jima, an island in Japan

People:

- Oge Okoye, Nigerian actress
- Vincent Ogé, Haitian revolutionary

== See also ==
- Ogee
