= Education in Russia =

Ministry of Education and Ministry of Science and Higher Education
- Minister for Education and Minister for Science and Higher Education: Sergey Kravtsov and Valery Falkov

National education budget (2024)
- Budget: 1.5 trillion rubles

General details
- Primary languages: Russian
- System type: National

Literacy
- Male: 99.7%
- Female: 99.6%

In Russia, the state provides most education services regulating education through the Ministry of Education and the Ministry of Science and Higher Education. Regional authorities regulate education within their jurisdictions within the prevailing framework of federal laws. Russia's expenditure on education has grown from 2.7% of the GDP in 2005 to 4.7% in 2018 but remains below the OECD average of 4.9%.

Before 1990 the course of school training in the Soviet Union lasted 10 years, but at the end of 1990, an 11-year course officially came into operation. Education in state-owned secondary schools is free; first tertiary (university level) education is free with reservations: a substantial number of students enrol on full pay. Male and female students have equal shares in all stages of education, except in tertiary education where women lead with 57%.

A 2015 estimate by the United States Central Intelligence Agency puts the literacy rate in Russia at 99.7% (99.7% for men, 99.6% for women). According to a 2016 OECD estimate, 54% of Russia's adults (25- to 64-year-olds) have attained tertiary education, giving Russia the second-highest attainment of tertiary education among 35 OECD member countries. 47.7% have completed secondary education (the full 11-year course); 26.5% have completed middle school (9 years) and 8.1% have primary education (at least 4 years). The highest rates of tertiary education (24.7%) are recorded among women aged 35 to 39 years (compared to 19.5% for men of the same age bracket).

Compared with other OECD countries, Russia has close to average class sizes and some of the shortest instruction hours per year.

In 2014 the Pearson/Economist Intelligence Unit rated Russia's education as the 8th-best in Europe and the 13th-best in the world; Russia's educational attainment was rated as the 21st-highest in the world, and the students' cognitive skills as the 9th-highest.

In 2015 the OECD ranked Russian students' mathematics and science skills as the 34th-best in the world, between Sweden and Iceland.

In 2016 the US company Bloomberg rated Russia's higher education as the third-best in the world, measuring the percentage of high-school graduates who go on to attend college, the annual science and engineering graduates as a percentage of all college graduates, and science and engineering graduates as a percentage of the labor force.

In 2014 Russia ranked as the 6th most popular destination for international students.

The Human Rights Measurement Initiative finds that Russia is fulfilling 86.8% of what it should be fulfilling for the right to education, based on its level of income.

In 2025, Russia continued to maintain a large higher-education system, with more than 1,200 universities and over 619,000 state-funded higher-education places available for new students. The Russian Ministry of Science and Higher Education also reported that more than 395,000 international students were studying at Russian universities within the country, with the government aiming to increase the number of international students to at least 500,000 by 2030.

== Levels of education ==
According to the law, the educational system of Russia includes 2 types of education: general and professional.

General education has the following levels:

- Preschool education (level 0 according to the ISCED)
- Primary general education (level 1 according to the ISCED) – the duration of study is 4 years
- Basic general education (level 2 according to the ISCED) – the duration of study is 5 years
- Secondary general education (level 3 according to the ISCED) – the duration of study is 2 years

Furthermore, there is also an additional general education (school-based study groups and clubs).

Professional education has the following levels:

- Training for professions – it is available on the basis of primary general education; the duration of study depends on the particular profession, as a rule, not exceeding several months
- Vocational education – it is available on the basis of basic general education or secondary general education; the duration of study is 3 years (on the basis of secondary general education) or 4 years (on the basis of basic general education; in this case the program includes secondary general education)
- Higher education:
  - Bachelor's degree – it is available on the basis of secondary general education; the duration of study is 4 years
  - Specialist degree – it is available on the basis of secondary general education and only for certain medical and engineering specialties; the duration of study is from 5 to 6 years depending on the particular academic major
  - Master's degree – it is available for persons who have any academic degree; the duration of study is 2 years
- Postgraduate education (graduate school, residency in medicine, assistantship in the field of art, adjunctura in the field of military science) – it is available for persons who have a specialist degree or master's degree; the duration of study is from 2 to 4 years depending on academic discipline

Furthermore, there is also an additional professional education. It is available for graduates of institutions of vocational or higher education.

== Preschool and primary school ==
Training the profession of a doctor, dancer and painter in Kidburg, the city of children. Saint-Petersburg, 2018.

Training the profession of an architect, fireman and floral designer in Kidburg, 2018.

According to the 2002 census, 68% of children (78% urban and 47% rural) aged 5 were enrolled in kindergartens. According to UNESCO data, enrolment in any kind of pre-school programme increased from 67% in 1999 to 84% in 2005.

Kindergartens, unlike schools, are regulated by regional and local authorities. The Ministry of Education and Science regulates only a brief preschool preparation programme for 5–6-year-old children. In 2004 the government attempted to charge the full cost of kindergartens to the parents; widespread public opposition caused a reversal of policy. Currently, local authorities can legally charge the parents not more than 20% of costs. Twins, children of university students, refugees, Chernobyl veterans, and other protected social groups are entitled to free service.

Pre-school (or Kindergarten) begins at the age of eighteen months old to six years old.

The Soviet system provided for nearly universal primary (nursery, age 1 to 3) and kindergarten (age 3 to 7) service in urban areas, relieving working mothers from daytime childcare needs. By the 1980s, there were 88,000 preschool institutions; as the secondary-education study load increased and moved from the ten to eleven-year standard, the kindergarten programmes shifted from training basic social skills, or physical abilities, to preparation for entering the school level. After the collapse of the Soviet Union the number decreased to 46,000; kindergarten buildings were sold as real estate, irreversibly rebuilt and converted for office use. At the same time, a minority share of successful state-owned kindergartens, regarded as a vertical lift to quality schooling, flourished throughout the 1990s. Privately owned kindergartens, although in high demand, did not gain a significant share due to administrative pressure; share of children enrolled in private kindergartens dropped from 7% in 1999 to 1% in 2005.

The improvement of the economy after the 1998 crisis, coupled with historical demographic peak, resulted in an increase in birth rate, first recorded in 2005. Large cities encountered shortage of kindergarten vacancies earlier, in 2002. Moscow's kindergarten waiting list included 15,000 children; in the much smaller city of Tomsk (population 488,000) it reached 12,000. The city of Moscow instituted specialised kindergarten commissions that are tasked with locating empty slots for the children; parents sign their children on the waiting list as soon as they are born. The degree of the problem varies between districts, e.g. Moscow's Fili-Davydkovo District (population 78,000) has lost all of its kindergartens (residents have to compete for kindergarten slots elsewhere) while Zelenograd claims to have short queue. Independent authors assert that bribes or "donations" for admission to kindergartens compete in amount with university admissions while authorities refute the accusation.

The number of Russian children enrolled in preschool institutions reached 7.44 million in 2020, marking a decrease from the previous year. The birth rate saw a decrease from 2020, after growing in the late 2000s and the early 2010s.

== Secondary school ==
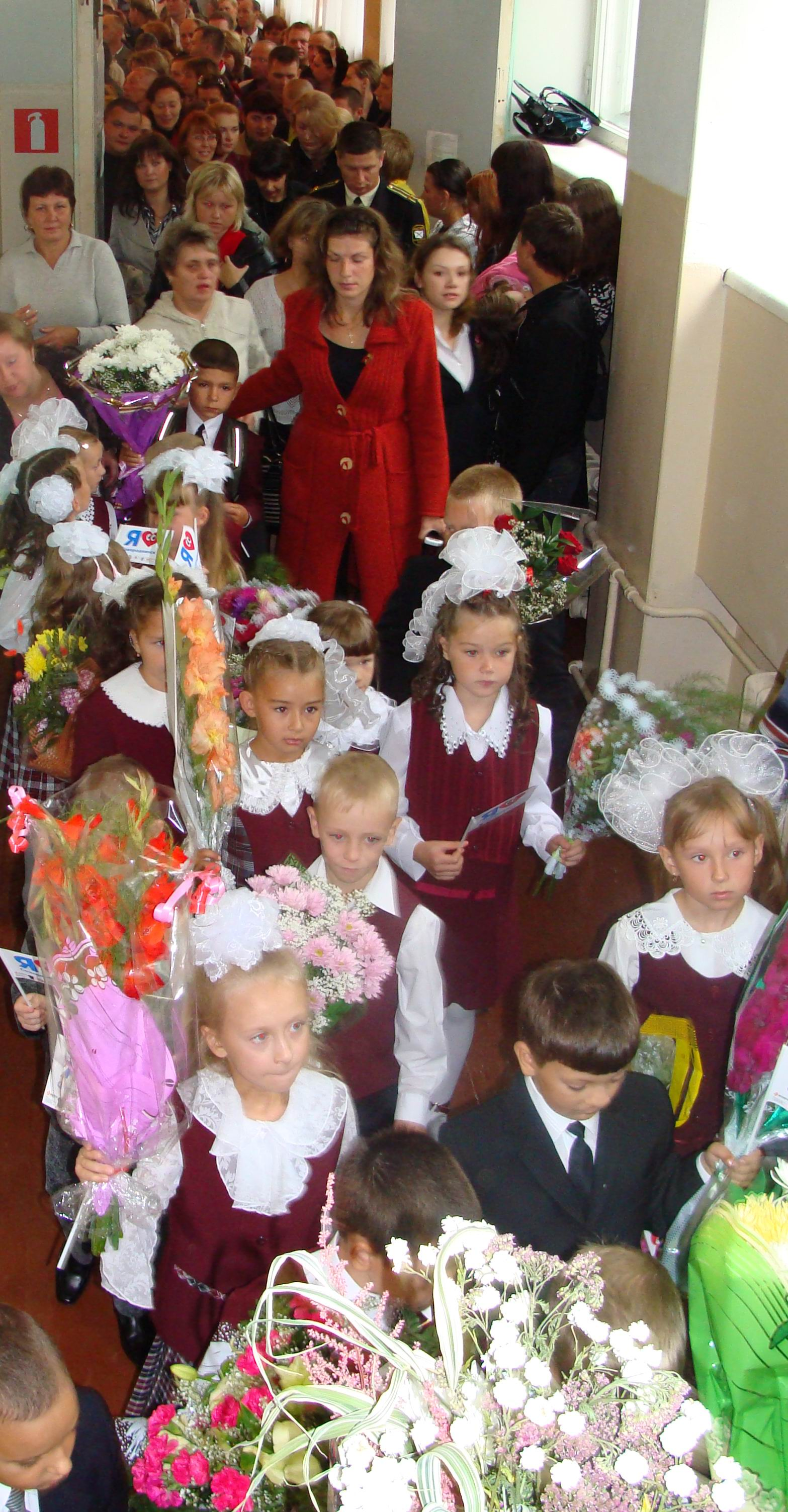
The 1st of September, Knowledge Day in Russia

=== General framework ===
There were 59,260 general education schools in 2007–2008 school year, an increase from 58,503 in the previous year. However, prior to 2005–2006, the number of schools was steadily decreasing from 65,899 in 2000–2001. The 2007–2008 number includes 4,965 advanced learning schools specializing in foreign languages, mathematics etc.; 2,347 advanced general-purpose schools, and 1,884 schools for all categories of disabled children; it does not include vocational technical school and technicums. Private schools accounted for 0.3% of primary school enrolment in 2005 and 0.5% in 2005.

According to a 2005 UNESCO report, 96% of the adult population has completed lower secondary schooling and most of them also have an upper secondary education.

Nine-year secondary education in Russia is compulsory since September 1, 2007. Until 2007, it was limited to nine years with years 10–11 optional; federal subjects of Russia could enforce higher compulsory standard through local legislation within the eleven–year federal programme. Moscow enacted compulsory eleven–year education in 2005, similar legislation existed in Altai Krai, Sakha and Tyumen Oblast. A student of 15 to 18 years of age may drop out of school with the approval of their guardian and local authorities, and without their consent upon reaching age of 18. Expulsion from school for multiple violations disrupting school life is possible starting at the age of 15.

The eleven-year school term is split into primary (years 1–4), middle (years 5–9), and senior (years 10–11) classes. The absolute majority of children attend full programme schools providing eleven-year education; schools limited to primary or primary and middle classes typically exist in rural areas. Of all the 59,260 schools in Russia, 36,248 provide the full eleven-year programme, 10,833 offer nine-year "basic" (primary and middle) education, and 10,198 only offer primary education. Their number is disproportionately large compared to their share of students due to lesser class sizes in rural schools. In areas where school capacity is insufficient to teach all students on a normal, morning-to-afternoon, schedule, authorities resort to double-shift schools, where two streams of students (morning shift and evening shift) share the same facility. There were 13,100 double-shift and 75 triple-shift schools in 2007–2008, compared to 19,201 and 235 in 2000–2001.

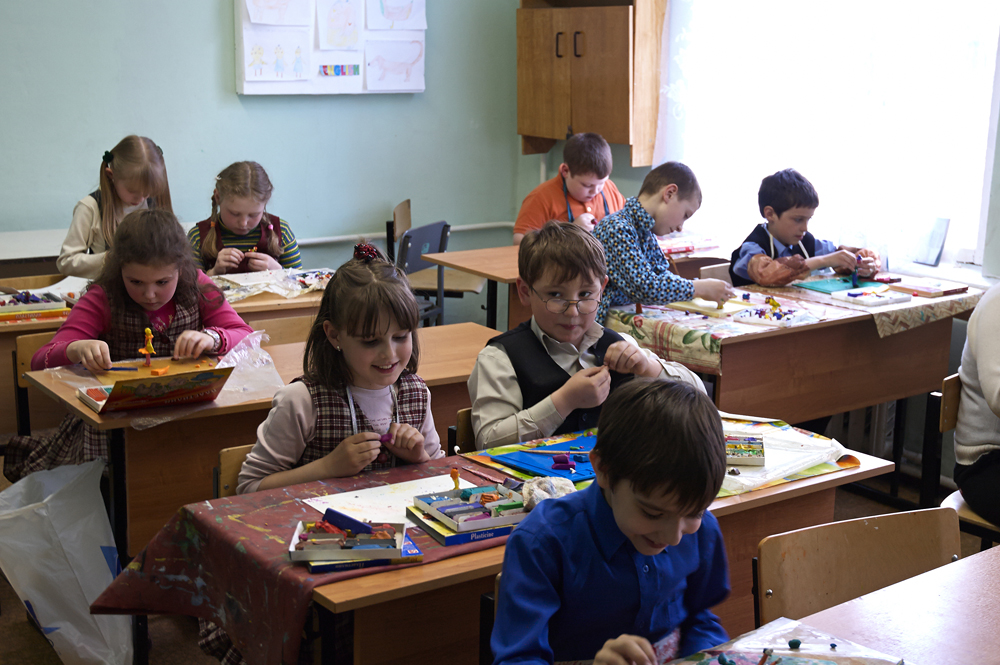
Primary school in Elektrostal

Children are accepted to the first year at the age of 6 or 7, depending on the individual development of each child. Until 1990, starting age was set at seven years and schooling lasted ten years for students who were planning to proceed to higher education in Universities. Students who were planning to proceed to technical schools were doing so, as a rule, after the 8th year. The switch from a ten to eleven-year term was motivated by continuously increasing load in middle and senior years. In the 1960s, it resulted in a "conversion" of the fourth year from primary to middle school. The decrease in primary schooling led to greater disparity between children entering middle school; to compensate for the "missing" fourth year, primary schooling was extended with a "zero year" for six-year-olds. This move remains a subject of controversy.

Children of primary classes are normally separated from other classes within their own floor of a school building. They are taught, ideally, by a single teacher through all four primary years (except for physical training and, if available, foreign languages); 98.5% of primary school teachers are women. Their number decreased from 349,000 in 1999 to 317,000 in 2005. Starting from the fifth year, each academic subject is taught by a dedicated subject teacher (80.4% women in 2004, an increase from 75.4% in 1991). Pupil-to-teacher ratio (11:1) is on par with developed European countries. Teachers' average monthly salaries in 2008 range from 6,200 roubles (200 US dollars) in Mordovia to 21,000 roubles (700 US dollars) in Moscow.

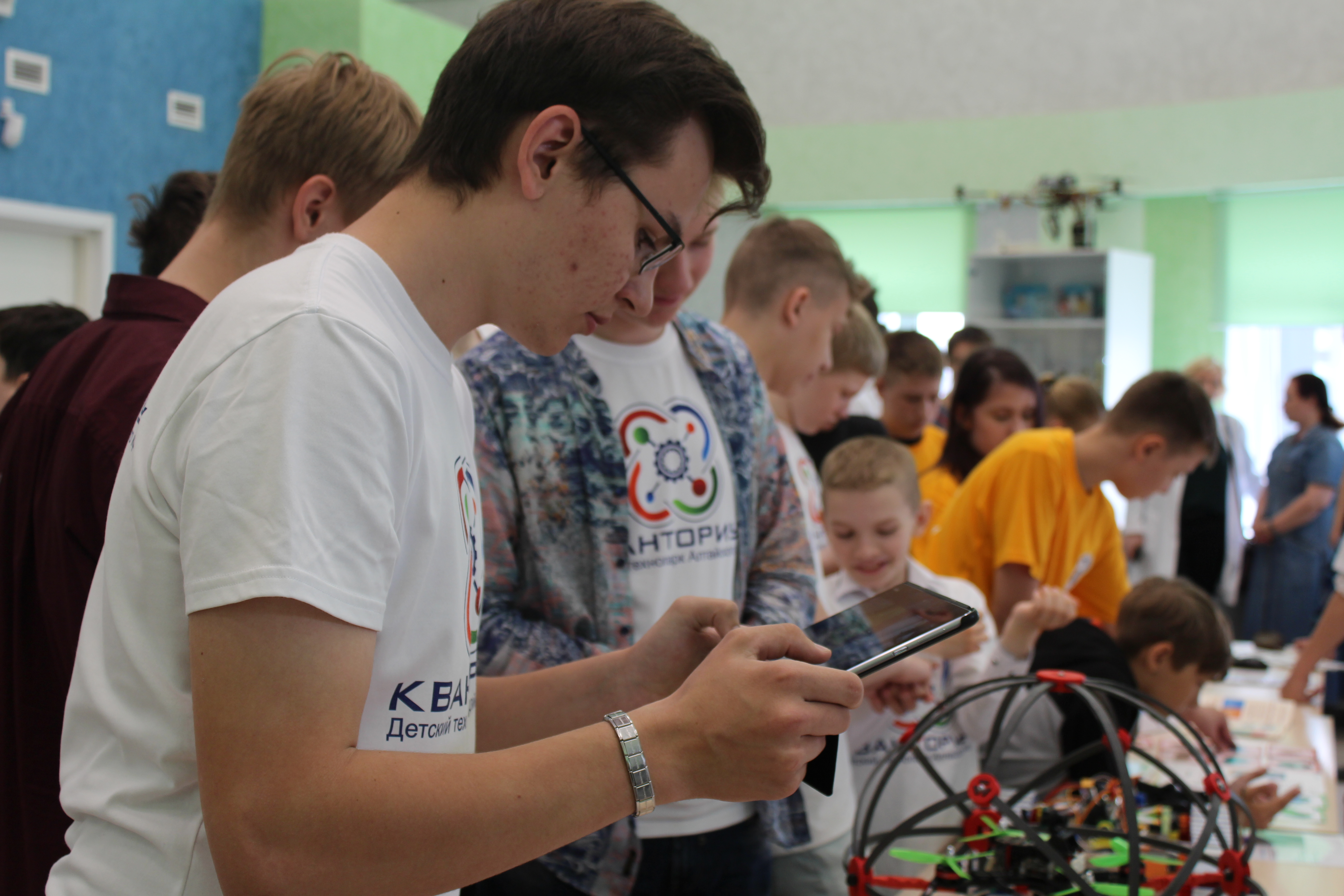
A schoolchild is preparing to present his project

The school year extends from September 1 to the end of May and is divided into four terms. Study programme in schools is fixed; unlike in some Western countries, schoolchildren or their parents have no choice of study subjects. Class load per student (638 hours a year for nine-year-olds, 893 for thirteen-year-olds) is lower than in Chile, Peru or Thailand, and slightly lower than in most states of the United States, although official hours are frequently appended with additional class work. Students are graded on a 5-step scale, ranging in practice from 2 ("unacceptable") to 5 ("excellent"); 1 is a rarely used sign of extreme failure. Teachers regularly subdivide these grades (i.e. 4+, 5−) in daily use, but term and year results are graded strictly 2, 3, 4 or 5. Starting from the 1st of September, 2026, "behaviour" will also be graded alongside subjects.

Some secondary schools conduct, in addition to the standard programme, an in-depth study of some subjects (schools focused on mathematics, foreign languages, arts, military-related subjects, etc.). These schools are considered more prestigious than the usual secondary schools.

=== Vocational training option ===
Upon completion of a nine-year programme the student has a choice of either completing the remaining two years at normal school, or of a transfer to a specialised professional training school. Historically, those were divided into low-prestige PTUs and better-regarded technicums and medical (nurse level) schools; in the 2000s, many such institutions, if operational, have been renamed as colleges. They provide students with a vocational skill qualification and a high school certificate equivalent to 11-year education in a normal school; the programme, due to its work training component, extends over 3 years. In 2007–08 there were 2,800 such institutions with 2,280,000 students. Russian vocational schools, like the Tech Prep schools in the USA, fall out of ISCED classification, thus the enrolment number reported by UNESCO is lower, 1.41 million; the difference is attributed to senior classes of technicums that exceed secondary education standard.

All certificates of secondary education (Maturity Certificate, Russian: аттестат зрелости), regardless of issuing institution, conform to the same national standard and are considered, at least in law, to be fully equivalent. The state prescribes a minimum (and nearly exhaustive) set of study subjects that must appear in each certificate. In practice, extension of study terms to three years slightly disadvantages vocational schools' male students who intend to continue: they reach conscription age before graduation or immediately after it, and normally must serve in the army before applying to undergraduate-level institutions.

Although all male pupils are eligible to postpone their conscription to receive higher education, they must be at least signed-up for the admission tests into the university the moment they get the conscription notice from the army. Most military commissariat officials are fairly considerate towards the potential recruits on that matter and usually allow graduates enough time to choose the university and sign-up for admission or enrol there on a paid basis despite the fact that the spring recruiting period has not yet ended by the time most students graduate. All those people may legally be commanded to present themselves to the recruitment centres the next day after graduation.

Males of conscription age that chose not to continue their education at any stage were usually given notice from the army within half a year after their education ends due to of the periodic nature of recruitment periods in Russian army. However, Russian conscription became year-round in 2026.

=== Unified state examinations ===
Traditionally, the universities and institutes conducted their own admissions tests regardless of the applicants' school record. There was no uniform measure of graduates' abilities; marks issued by high schools were perceived as incompatible due to grading variances between schools and regions. In 2003 the Ministry of Education launched the Unified state examination (USE) programme. The set of standardised tests for high school graduates, issued uniformly throughout the country and rated independent of the student's schoolmasters, akin to the North American SAT, was supposed to replace entrance exams to state universities. Thus, the reformers reasoned, the USE would empower talented graduates from remote locations to compete for admissions at the universities of their choice, at the same time eliminating admission-related bribery, then estimated at 1 billion US dollars annually. In 2003, 858 university and college workers were indicted for bribery; the admission "fee" in MGIMO allegedly reached 30,000 US dollars.

University heads, notably Moscow State University rector Viktor Sadovnichiy, resisted the change, arguing that their schools cannot survive without charging the applicants with their own entrance hurdles. Nevertheless, the legislators enacted USE in February 2007. In 2008, it was mandatory for the students and optional for the universities; it is fully mandatory since 2009. A few higher education establishments are still allowed to introduce their own entrance tests in addition to USE scoring; such tests must be publicised in advance.

Awarding USE grades involves two stages. In this system, a "primary grade" is the sum of points for completed tasks, with each of the tasks having a maximum number of points allocated to it. The maximum total primary grade varies by subject, so that one might obtain, for instance, a primary grade of 23 out of 37 in mathematics and a primary grade of 43 out of 80 in French. The primary grades are then converted into final or "test grades" by means of a sophisticated statistical calculation, which takes into account the distribution of primary grades among the examinees. This system has been criticised for its lack of transparency.

The first nationwide USE session covering all regions of Russia was held in the summer of 2008. 25.3% students failed the literature test, 23.5% failed mathematics; the highest grades were recorded in French, English and social studies. Twenty thousand students filed objections against their grades; one third of objections were settled in the student's favor.

The Basic State Exam is also held after nine years of education, two years before the Unified State Exam.

== Education for the disabled ==
=== Physical disability ===
Children with physical disabilities, depending on the nature and extent of the disability and the availability of local specialised institutions, attend either such institutions or special classes within regular schools. As of 2007, there were 80 schools for the blind and children with poor eyesight; their school term is extended to 12 years and classes are limited to 9–12 pupils per teacher. Education for the deaf is provided by 99 specialised kindergartens and 207 secondary boarding schools; children who were born deaf are admitted to specialised kindergartens as early as possible, ideally from 18 months of age; they are schooled separately from children who lost hearing after acquiring basic speech skills. Vocational schools for the working deaf people who have not completed secondary education exist in five cities only. Another wide network of specialist institutions takes care of children with mobility disorders. 60–70% of all children with cerebral palsy are schooled through this channel. Children are admitted to specialised kindergartens at three or four years of age and streamed into narrow specialty groups; the specialisation continues throughout their school term and may extend to thirteen years. The system, however, is not ready to accept children who also display evident developmental disability; they have no other option than home schooling. All graduates of physical disability schools are entitled to the same level of secondary education certificates as normal graduates.

There are 42 specialised vocational training (non-degree) colleges for disabled people; most notable are the School of Music for the Blind in Kursk and the Medical School for the Blind in Kislovodsk. Fully segregated undergraduate education is provided by two colleges: the Institute of Arts for the Disabled (enrolment of 158 students in 2007) and the Social Humanitarian Institute (enrolment of 250 students), both in Moscow. Other institutions provide semi-segregated training (specialised groups within a normal college environment) or declare full disability access of their regular classes. Bauman Moscow State Technical University and Chelyabinsk State University have the highest number of disabled students (170 each, 2007). Bauman University focuses on education for the deaf; the Herzen Pedagogical Institute enrol different groups of physical disability. However, independent studies assert that the universities fail to integrate people with disabilities into their academic and social life.

=== Mental disability ===
An estimated 20% of children leaving kindergarten fail to adjust to primary school requirements and are in need of special schooling. Children with delayed development who may return to normal schools and study along with normal children are trained at compensatory classes within regular schools. The system is intended to prepare these children for normal school at the earliest possible age, closing (compensating) the gap between them and normal students. It is a relatively new development that began in the 1970s and gained national approval in the 1990s.

Persistent but mild mental disabilities that preclude co-education with normal children in the foreseeable future but do not qualify as moderate, heavy, or severe retardation require specialized correction (Russian: коррекционные) boarding schools that extend from 8–9 to 18–21 years of age. Their task is to adapt the person to living in a modern society, rather than to subsequent education.

Children with stronger forms of intellectual disability are, as of 2008, mostly excluded from the education system. Some are trained within severe disability groups of the correction boarding schools and orphanages, others are aided only through counseling.

== Tertiary (university level) education ==
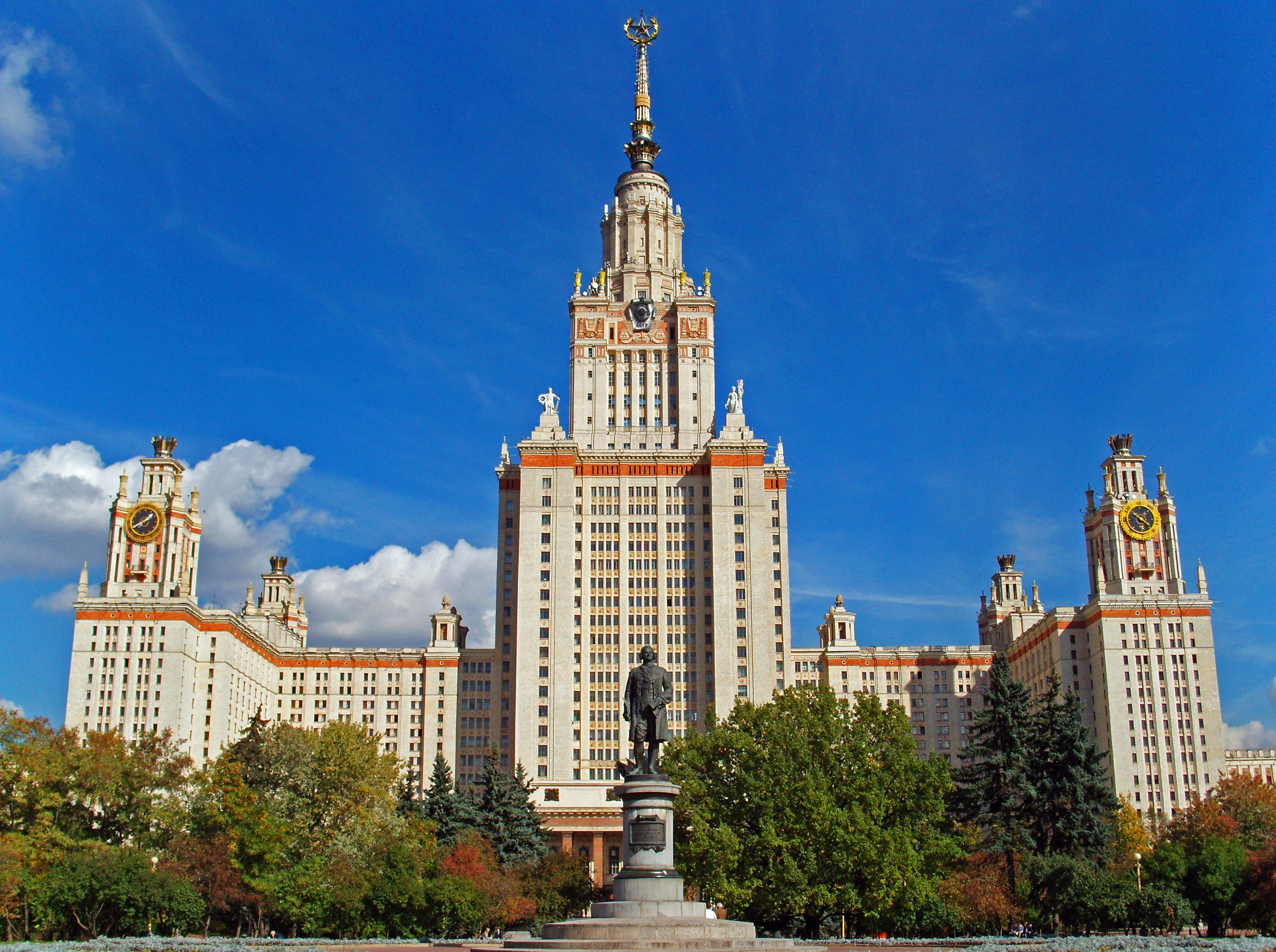
Main building of the Moscow State University in Moscow, Russia

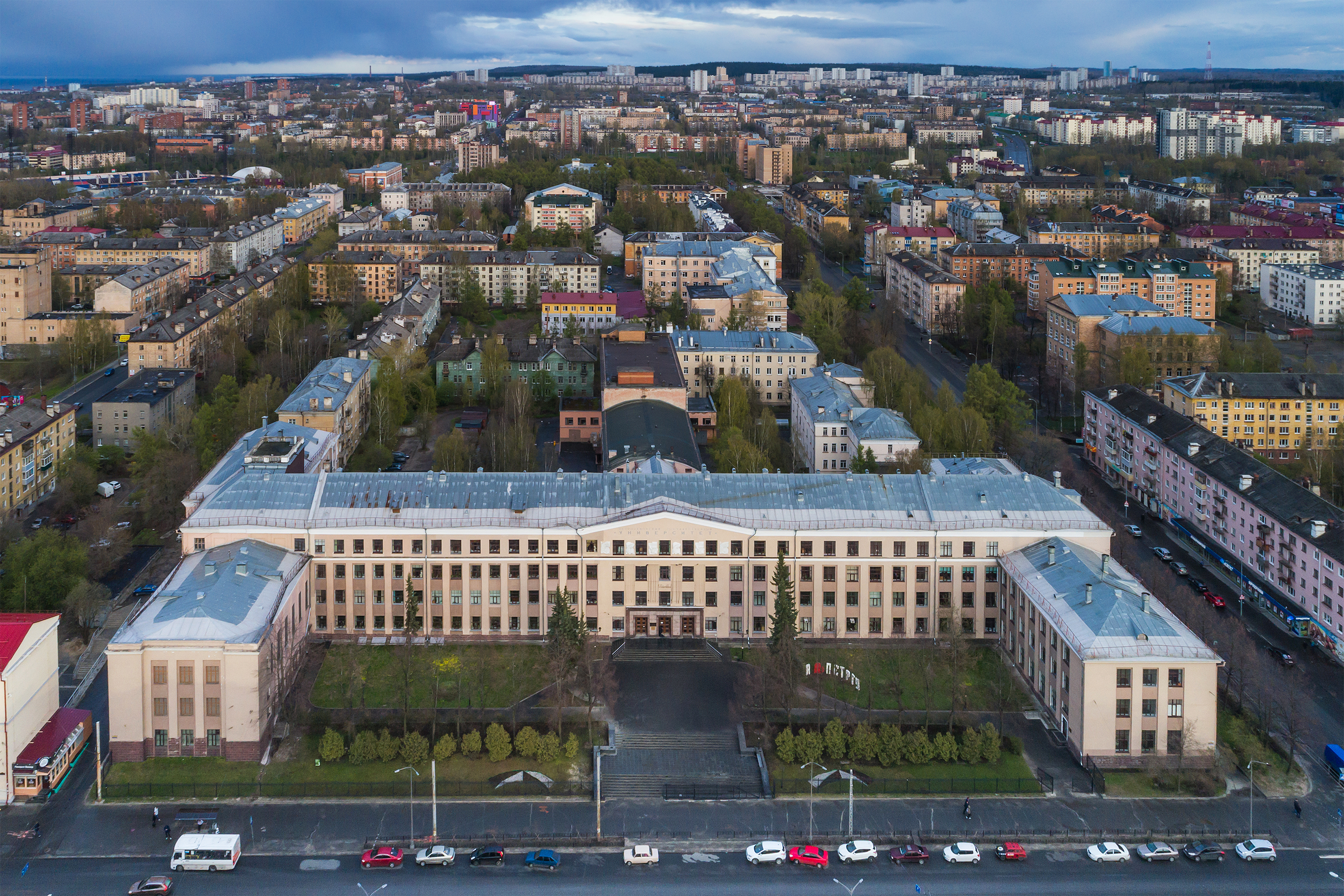
The Petrozavodsk State University in Petrozavodsk, Republic of Karelia

According to a 2005 UNESCO report, more than half of the Russian adult population has attained a tertiary education, which is twice as high as the OECD average.

As of the 2007–2008 academic year, Russia had 8.1 million students enrolled in all forms of tertiary education (including military and police institutions and postgraduate studies). Foreign students accounted for 5.2% of enrolment, half of whom were from other CIS countries. 6.2 million students were enrolled in 658 state-owned and 450 private civilian university-level institutions licensed by the Ministry of Education; total faculty reached 625 thousands in 2005.

The number of state-owned institutions was rising steadily from 514 in 1990 to 655 in 2002 and remains nearly constant since 2002. The number of private institutions, first reported as 193 in 1995, continues to rise. The trend for consolidation began in 2006 when state universities and colleges of Rostov-on-Don, Taganrog and other southern towns were merged into Southern Federal University, based in Rostov-on-Don; a similar conglomerate was formed in Krasnoyarsk as Siberian Federal University; the third one emerged in Vladivostok as Far Eastern Federal University. Moscow State University and Saint Petersburg State University acquired the federal university status in 2007 without further organisational changes.

Andrei Fursenko, Minister of Education from 2004 to 2012, called for a reduction in number of institutions to weed out diploma mills and substandard colleges; in April 2008 his stance was approved by president Dmitry Medvedev: "This amount, around a thousand universities and two thousands spinoffs, does not exist anywhere else in the world; it may be over the top even for China ... consequences are clear: devaluation of education standard". Even supporters of the reduction like Yevgeny Yasin admit that the move will strengthen consolidation of academia in Moscow, Saint Petersburg and Novosibirsk and devastate the provinces, leaving the federal subjects of Russia without colleges for training local school teachers. For a comparison, the United States has a total of 4,495 Title IV-eligible, degree-granting institutions: 2,774 BA/BSc degree institutions and 1,721 AA/ASc degree institutions.

Financial and visa difficulties have historically made it difficult to obtain higher education abroad for young adults in the post-Soviet era.

=== Traditional model ===
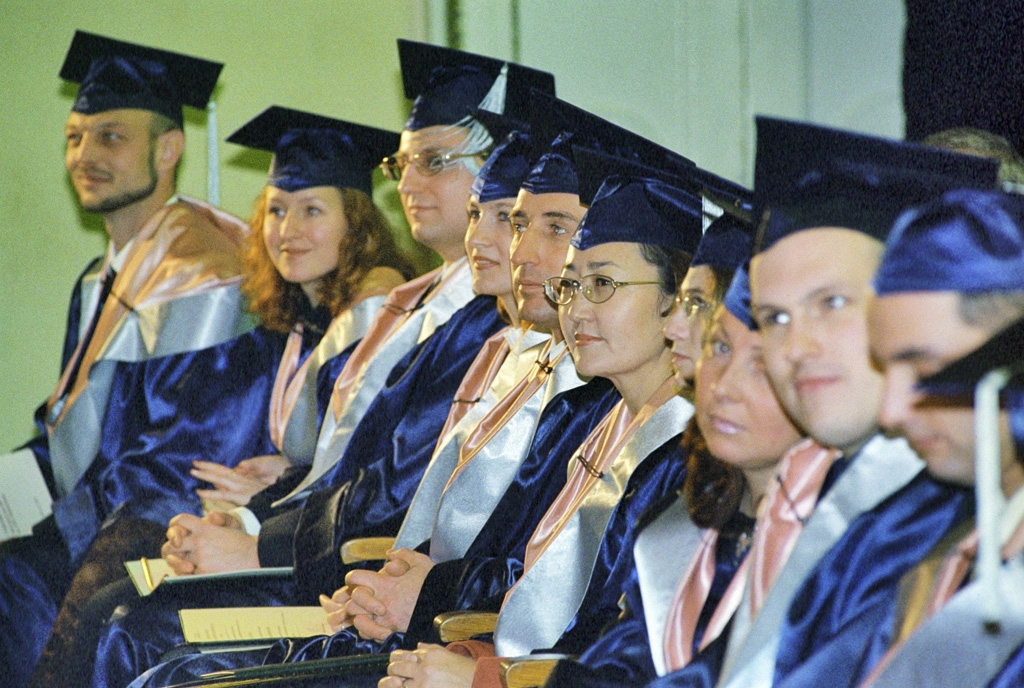
Graduates of the Moscow University's Higher School of Business

Unlike the United States or Bologna process model, Russian higher education was traditionally not divided into undergraduate (bachelor's) and graduate (master's) levels. Instead, tertiary education was undertaken in a single stage, typically five or six years in duration, which resulted in a specialist diploma. Specialist diplomas were perceived equal to Western MSc/MA qualification. A specialist graduate needed no further academic qualification to pursue a professional career, with the exception of some (but not all) branches of medical professions that required a post-graduate residency stage. Military college education lasted four years and was ranked as equivalent to specialist degree.

Historically, civilian tertiary education was divided between a minority of traditional wide curriculum universities and a larger number of narrow specialisation institutes (including art schools). Many of these institutes, such as the Moscow Engineering Physics Institute, and the Gerasimov Institute of Cinematography, are concentrated primarily in Moscow and Saint Petersburg. Institutes whose graduates are in wide demand throughout Russia, such as medical and teachers' institutes, are spread more evenly across the country. Institutes in geographically specific fields will tend to be situated in areas serving their specialties. Mining and metallurgy institutes are located in ore-rich territories, and maritime and fishing institutes are located in seaport communities.

Legal education in Russia exists both within universities and as standalone law institutes such as the Academic Law University (Russian: Академический правовой университет, АПУ) founded under the auspices of the Institute of State and Law. In the 1990s many technical institutes and new private schools created their own departments of law; as of 2008, law departments trained around 750 thousands students.

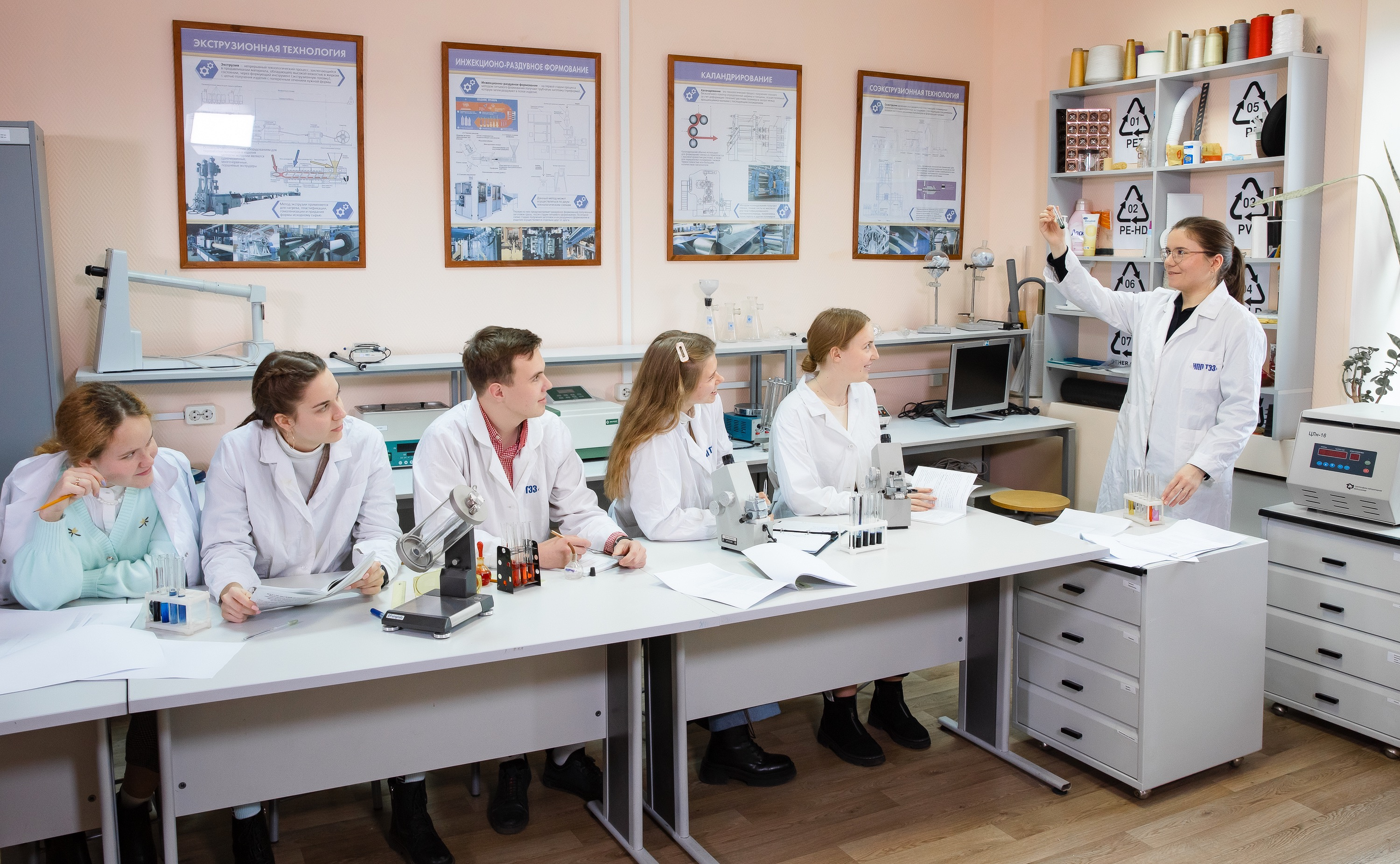
Students of the Moscow State University of Technology and Management

In the 1990s the institutes typically renamed themselves universities, while retaining their historical narrow specialisation. More recently, a number of these new private 'universities' have been renamed back to 'institutes' to reflect their narrower specialisation. In these institutes, the student's specialisation within a chosen department was fixed upon admission, and moving between different streams within the same department was difficult. Study programmes were (and still are) rigidly fixed for the whole term of study; the students have little choice in planning their academic progress. Mobility between institutions with compatible study programmes was allowed infrequently, usually due to family relocation from town to town.

=== Move towards Bologna Process and expulsion from it ===
Russia was in the process of migrating from its traditional tertiary education model, incompatible with existing Western academic degrees, to a degree structure in line with the Bologna Process model. (Russia co-signed the Bologna Declaration in 2003.) In October 2007 Russia enacted a law that replaces the traditional five-year model of education with a two-tiered approach: a four-year bachelor (Russian: бакалавр) degree followed by a two-year master's (Russian: магистр, magistr) degree.

The move has been criticised for its merely formal approach: instead of reshaping their curriculum, universities would simply insert a BSc/BA accreditation in the middle of their standard five or six-year programmes. The job market is generally unaware of the change and critics predict that stand-alone BSc/BA diplomas will not be recognised as "real" university education in the foreseeable future, rendering the degree unnecessary and undesirable without further specialisation. Institutions like MFTI or MIFI have practiced a two-tier breakdown of their specialist programmes for decades and switched to Bologna process designations well in advance of the 2007 law, but an absolute majority of their students complete all six years of MSc/MA curriculum, regarding BSc/BA stage as useless in real life.

Student mobility among universities has been traditionally discouraged and thus kept at very low level; there are no signs that formal acceptance of the Bologna Process will help students seeking better education. Finally, while the five-year specialist training was previously free to all students, the new MSc/MA stage is not. The shift forces students to pay for what was free to the previous class; the cost is unavoidable because the BSc/BA degree alone is considered useless. Defenders of the Bologna Process argue that the final years of the specialist programme were formal and useless: academic schedules were relaxed and undemanding, allowing students to work elsewhere. Cutting the five-year specialist programme to a four-year BSc/BA will not decrease the actual academic content of most of these programmes.

Russia was expelled from the Bologna Process in 2022 after the beginning of full-scale invasion of Ukraine. In response Moscow has announced the abolishment of Bachelor's and Master's degrees.

== Post-graduate levels ==
Postgraduate diploma structure so far retains its unique Soviet pattern established in 1934. The system makes a distinction between scientific degrees, evidencing personal postgraduate achievement in scientific research, and related but separate academic titles, evidencing personal achievement in university-level education.

There are two successive postgraduate degrees: Candidate of Sciences (Kandidat Nauk) and Doctor of Sciences (Doktor Nauk). Both are a certificate of scientific, rather than academic, achievement, and must be backed up by original/novel scientific work, evidenced by publications in peer-reviewed journals and a dissertation defended in front of senior academic board. The titles are issued by Higher Attestation Commission of the Ministry of Education. A degree is always awarded in one of 23 predetermined fields of science, even if the underlying achievement belongs to different fields. Thus it is possible to defend two degrees of candidate independently, but not simultaneously; a doctor in one field may also be a candidate in a different field.

Candidate of Sciences can be achieved within university environment (when the university is engaged in active research in the chosen field), specialised research facilities or within research and development units in industry. Typical Candidate of Sciences path from admission to diploma takes 2–4 years. The dissertation paper should contain a solution of an existing scientific problem, or a practical proposal with significant economical or military potential. The title is often perceived as equivalent to Western Ph.D., although this may vary depending on the field of study, and may not be seen as such outside of Russia but as a more significant degree.

Doctor of Sciences, the next stage, implies achieving significant scientific output. This title is often equated to the German or Scandinavian habilitation. The dissertation paper should summarise the author's research resulting in theoretical statements that are qualified as a new discovery, or solution of an existing problem, or a practical proposal with significant economical or military potential. The road from Candidate to Doctor typically takes 10 years of dedicated research activity; one in four candidates reaches this stage. The system implies that the applicants must work in their research field full-time; however, the degrees in social sciences are routinely awarded to active politicians.

Academic titles of docent and professor are issued to active university staff who already achieved degrees of candidate or doctor; the rules prescribe minimum residency term, authoring established study textbooks in their chosen field, and mentoring successful postgraduate trainees; special, less formal rules apply to professors of arts.

Military postgraduate education radically falls out of the standard scheme. It includes military academy courses and adjunctura (Russian: адъюнктура). Unlike their Western namesakes, Russian military academies are postgraduate institutions conducting the advance training career commissioned officer programmes. Passing the course of an academy does not result in an explicitly named degree and enables the graduate to proceed to a certain level of command (equivalent of battalion commander and above). Adjunctura is a military analogue of civilian graduate school, which allow commissioned officers to get academic degree of candidate of military sciences and be appointed to teaching and scientific positions in military educational and scientific research institutions.

== Science outreach ==
On 1 June 2021, the Federal Law of 5 April 2021 №85-FZ "On Amendments to the Federal Law 'About education in Russian Federation'" entered into force. This law establishes the concept of the outreach activity: it is the activity, carrying out outside educational programmes, which aims to dissemination of a knowledge and an experience, to formation of a skills, a values, and a competence, in order to intellectual, spiritual and moral, creative, physical, and (or) professional development of individual, and to meet educational needs of individual. The manner, conditions and implementation modalities of outreach activity and also the procedure for the control of such activity regulated by Government of Russia. Outreach activity can be carried out by public and local authorities and natural and juridical persons concluded a contracts with educational institutions in the order determined by Government of Russia. Although the Russian Academy of Sciences and numerous cultural and educational societies opposed the bill, it was adopted by the State Duma, approved by the Federation Council and signed by the President of Russia Vladimir Putin.

According to scientists, science popularisers, educationalists, lawyers, this law, in fact, establishes the prior censorship of virtually every ways to share knowledge and conviction, contrary to the articles 19 and 29 of the Constitution of Russia. According to the authors, the law aims to shield Russian citizens against anti-Russian propaganda.

== Government propaganda ==
On 21 May 2020, The Moscow Times reported that Russian President Vladimir Putin made another effort to introduce "patriotic lessons" for Russian students. Following the Russian invasion of Ukraine, the Russian government increased their efforts to introduce "patriotic education" into schools. Education Minister Sergey Kravtsov is one of the architects of the Important Conversations lessons, which cover various topics from the Russian government's perspective, such as national identity, patriotism, traditional values and world events. The Associated Press reported that some parents were shocked by the militaristic nature of Important Conversations lessons, with some comparing them to the "patriotic education" of the former Soviet Union. Some Russian students and their parents have been investigated by the police, or threatened with expulsion, for refusing to attend the Important Conversations lessons. Putin hosted an inaugural lesson with selected students in the Russian exclave of Kaliningrad, on 1 September 2022. The Important Conversations were extended to kindergartens in 2025 and renamed to the "Good Games" in 2026. Russia also introduced "Family Studies" and "Spiritual and Moral Culture" as compulsory subjects for schoolchildren.

In 2023, the Ministry of Science and Higher Education made the "Fundamentals of Russian Statehood" a mandatory subject for all students

== Education in languages of Russia ==
Language	Number of schools with instruction in language						The number of schools teaching the language as a subject					Population
Language	1995/96	1997/98	2000/01	2001/02	2002/03	2013/14	1995/96	1997/98	2000/01	2001/02	2002 / 03	2002 (census)
Abaza	1	1	0	0	0		32		31	32	35	37,942
Agul	0	0	0	0	0		24		0	0	0	28,297
Avar	584	592	497	589	537		502		514	586	549	814,473
Adyghe	31	36	35	37	20		106		123	131	129	128,528
Azerbaijani	5	7	6	6	6		69		73	65	72	621,840
Altai	63	64	62	65	64		106		115	121	128	67,239
Armenian	2	6	7	3	7		34		17	19	16	1,130,491
Balkar	23	17	10	8	5		68		78	88	89	108,426
Bashkir	892	906	884	886	911		838		1222	1424	1426	1,673,389
Buryat	144	138	146	143	140		298		347	338	344	445,175
Vepsian	0	0	0	0	0		3		4	5	5	8,240
Georgian	1	1	1	1	1		2		2	3	4	197,934
Dargin	233	233	186	188	187		281		219	290	289	510,156
Dolgan	0	0	0	0	0		12		13	13	13	801
Hebrew	0	0	0	0	0		1		0	0	0	229,938
Yiddish	0	0	0	0	0		2		3	3	3	229,938
Ingush	–	–		–	0		92		103	104	111	413,016
Itelmen	0	0	0	0	0		2		3	2	2	3,180
Kabardian	106	92	86	74	74		179		188	208	219	519,958
Kazakh	1	1	1	1	1		107		70	89	92	653,962
Kalmyk	42	56	64	66	71		220		204	196	200	173,996
Karachaevsky	0	0	0	0	0		105		110	107	111	192,182
Karelian	0	0	0	0	0		29		32	43	40	93,344
Ket	0	0	0	0	0		6		6	8	5	1,494
Komi	0	0	0	0	0		276		366	372	371	293,406
Komi-Perm	0	0	0	0	0		82		81	77	67	125,235
Korean	0	0	0	0	0		4		7	6	8	148,556
Koryak	0	0	0	0	0		20		25	21	15	8,743
Kumyk	72	91	75	73	71		175		184	177	176	422,409
Lak	70	74	75	71	79		105		107	102	106	156,545
Latvian	0	0	0	0	0				2	2	3	28,520
Lezgin	148	122	149	137	148		199		215	214	210	411,535
Lithuanian	2	0	0	0	0		1		7	6	2	45,569
Mansi	0	0	0	0	0		6		13	12	12	11,432
Mari (Mountain)	41	43	39	33	20		34		47	40	38	
Mari (Meadow)	298	283	276	259	258		374		433	433	410	
Mordovia (Moksha)	137	134	110	113	117		137		118	127	121	
Mordovia (Erzya)	101	95	96	97	83		134		142	144	154	
Nanai	0	0	0	0	0		7		13	13	12	12,160
Nganasan	0	0	0	0	0		3		0	0	0	834
German	1	–	4	4	0		63		36	40	31	597,212
Nenets	0	0	0	0	0		34		36	39	35	41,302
Nivkh	0	0	0	0	0		5		4	3	5	5,162
Modern Greek	0	1	0	0	0		5		4	2	2	97,827
Nogai	2	0	0	0	0		57		61	63	65	90,666
Ossetia	64	57	58	53	45		202		160	199	197	514,875
Polish	0	0	0	0	0		1		3	3	3	73,001
Rutulsky	0	0	0	0	0		17		20	18	17	29,929
Sami	0	0	0	0	0		1		1	1	1	1,991
Selkup	0	0	0	0	0		5		5	6	5	4,249
Tabasaran	71	69	70	57	71		103		118	123	125	131,785
Tatar	2374	2406	2280	2207	2166	757	2185		2400	2524	2469	5,554,601
Tat	0	0	0	0	0		5		2	3	1	2,303
Tofalar	0	0	0	0	0		3		2	2	3	837
Tuva	150	151	152	151	153		129		140	142	147	243,442
Turkish	3	0	0	0	0		2		4	10	3	92,415
Turkmen	0	0	0	0	0		8		8	7	5	33,053
Udmurt	56	55	48	44	44		469		431	464	452	636,906
Ukrainian	0	0	0	0	0		5		8	4	5	2,942,961
Finnish	0	0	0	0	0		63		69	62	66	34,050
Khakassia	17	18	10	10	12		96		96	88	93	75,622
Khanty	0	0	0	0	0		18		33	33	34	28,678
Tsakhur	0	0	0	0	0		12		0	0	0	10,366
Circassian	8	7	7	8	7		41		43	41	43	60,517
Chechen	20	23	21	18	19		52		53	472	482	1,360,253
Chuvash	628	602	592	593	571		404		439	429	451	1,637,094
Chukotka	0	0	0	0	0		34		39	35	35	15,767
Shor	0	0	0	0	0		5		0	0	0	13,975
Evenk	1	–	6	–	0		40		43	44	31	35,527
Even	3	2	2	2	0		21		18	26	38	19,071
Eskimo	0	0	0	0	0		4		4	3	4	1,750
Estonian	1	1	1	1	1		–		1	1	1	28,113
Yukaghir	0	0	0	0	0		2		2	2	2	1,509
Yakut	430	419	426	441	445		75		99	98	94	443,852
All	6826	6803	6482	6439	6334		8841		9619	10,608	10,532	24,809,544

In December 2024, Russian State Duma accepted the law project, according to which schools will not accept foreign citizens who did not pass Russian language exam.

== See also ==
- List of universities in Russia
- Open access in Russia
- Timeline of Russian inventions and technology records
- List of Russian scientists
- Education in the Soviet Union
- Education in Bashkortostan

== Notes ==
- "Children out of school. Measuring exclusion from primary education" (PDF). Montreal: UNESCO Institute of Statistics. 2005.
- "Education for all by 2015: Will we make it?" (PDF). UNESCO, Oxford University Press. 2007.
- "Education counts: Benchmarking process in 19 WEI countries. World economic indicators – 2007" (PDF). Montreal: UNESCO Institute of Statistics. 2007.
- "Participation in formal technical and vocational training and education worldwide. An initial statistical study" (PDF). UNESCO International center for technical and vocational education and training (UNEVOC). 2006.
- "Teachers and educational quality: Monitoring global needs for 2015" (PDF). Montreal: UNESCO Institute of Statistics. 2006.
