= Education in Bashkortostan =

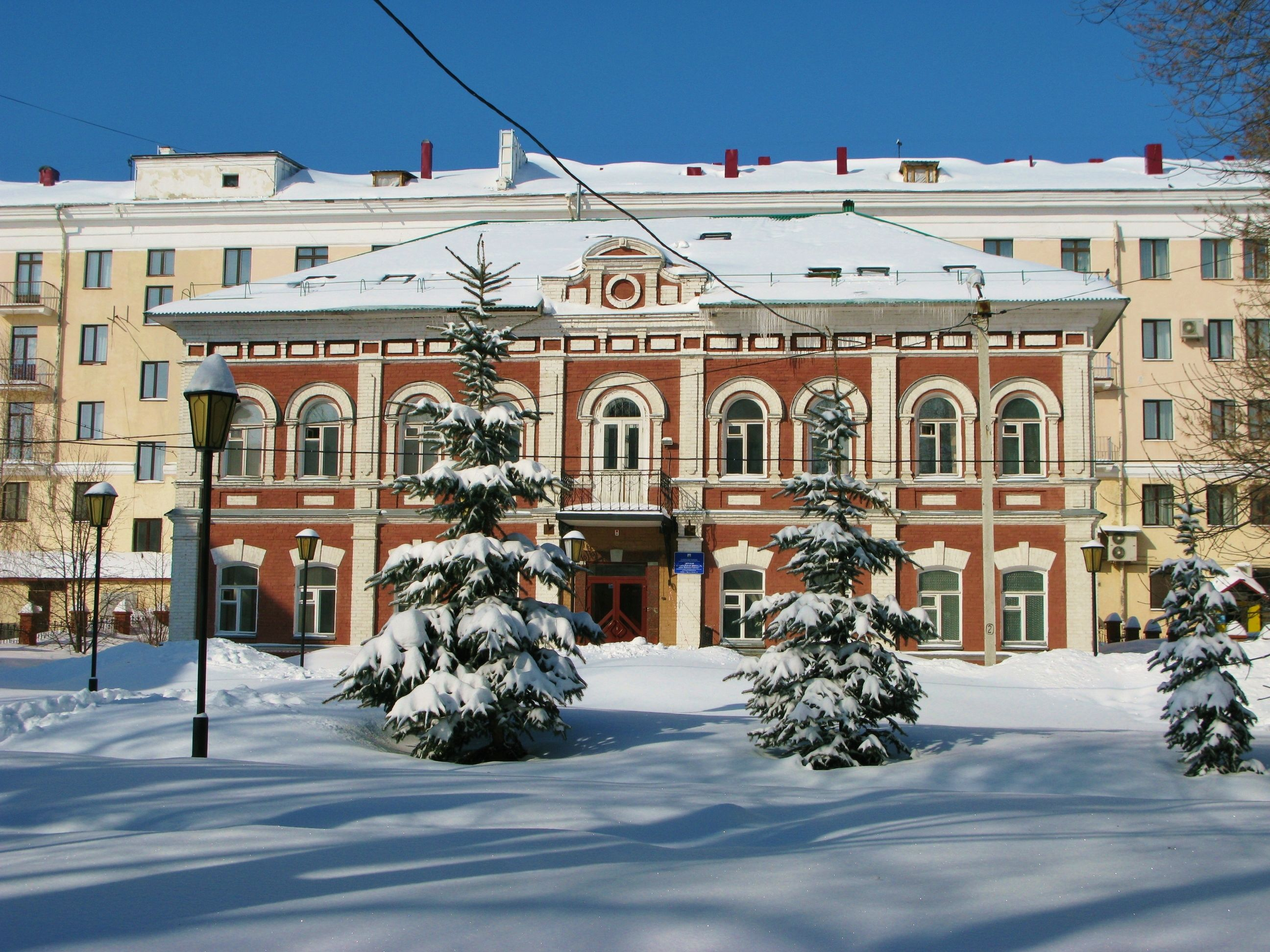
Nariman Sabitov Ufa School of Music

Education in Bashkortostan is part of the education system in Russia. A distinctive feature of this system is the possibility of studying in the Bashkir and Tatar languages and learning the languages of the national minority peoples in secondary schools with reservations: a substantial number of school students studying in Russian languages.

== Education in national minority languages in secondary schools ==
According to the Ministry of Education of Bashkortostan schoolchildren taught fourteen native languages at 2000 year. They are Bashkir, Russian, Tatar, Chuvash, Mari, Udmurt, Mordovian, German, Latvian, Ukrainian, Byelorussian, Greek, Jewish and Polish.

Taking into account needs of the republic for the teachers of native languages, there have been opened departments in Birsk State Pedagogical Institute (now Birsk branch of the Bashkir State University) for training them: teachers of the Bashkort language and literature — 1996; teachers of the Tatar language and literature — 1995; teachers of the Mari language and literature — 1993.

=== Education in Bashkir ===
Bashkir language is one of official languages of Bashkortostan. After 2010, the number of hours for studying the Bashkir language, literature, history and culture of Bashkortostan has drastically reduced in the republic under various pretexts in the curricula of schools. There is an acute question of the development of Bashkir schools. Under various pretexts, the federal authorities give priority to Russian schools. But unlike the Bashkir schools, all subjects in them, naturally, are conducted in Russian, because they face completely different tasks. Bashkir children studying in this way are deprived of the opportunity to study their native language, literature, history and culture of the people.

=== Education in Tatar ===
Since 2002, secondary school number 84 was reformed for the gymnasium with the Tatar language of studying.

=== Education in Moksha and Erzya ===
As of 2017 the Mordovian language was studied in six schools, and specialists in the field of the Mordovian language are trained for Bashkortostan schools on the basis of the Sterlitamak multi-vocational college.

=== Education in Armenian ===
The State Armenian School in Ufa was established by a decree of the Head of the Ufa City Administration in 2001.

=== Education in Hebrew ===
A Jewish secondary school in Ufa opened in 2003 with reservations: limited reception children are not Jewish.
