= Vokrug TV =

Russian film and television database

- Available in: Russian
- Owner: Gazprom-Media
- Website: https://www.vokrug.tv/
- Commercial: Yes
- Registration: Optional
- Current status: Active

Vokrug TV (Russian: Вокруг ТВ) is a Russian internet TV guide website that provides information on television programming, TV industry events, interviews with TV stars, news, and program listings. It is owned by Gazprom-Media and is part of the company's portfolio of media assets.

== History ==
The site underwent a rebranding in 2017, introducing a new logo, corporate style, and website design.

== Features ==
The website features various projects, including "Vokrug Kino," (Russian: Вокруг кино) an encyclopedia of movies, and the show "Bez Voprosov," which consists of interviews with TV and movie celebrities.

== Audience ==
According to Google Analytics, the site's audience in 2017 was 8.4 million unique users per month.

== See also ==
- Gazprom-Media
