= Ontario Global Edge Program =

The Ontario Global Edge Program is an international competitive internship program which allows postsecondary students aged 19 to 29 to gain international work experience. It was created and funded by the Government of Ontario.

The program sends students to a variety of locations around the world, including Hong Kong and Germany.

== Overview ==
As part of the March 2008 Ontario Budget, the Global Edge program was announced with funding of $1.7 million over four years, to facilitate international work and learning opportunities for enterprising post-secondary students.

== Approved schools ==
Currently, nine schools are approved to offer the Global Edge program.

- Carleton University
- Confederation College
- Fanshawe College
- George Brown College
- Seneca College
- University of Ontario Institute of Technology
- University of Ottawa
- University of Waterloo
- University of Western Ontario
