= Basic State Exam =

School examination in Russia

Official logo of the Basic State Exam (OGE) in Russia, 2024.

The Basic State Exam (Russian: Основной государственный экзамен; OGE) is the final exam for basic general education courses in Russia. It serves to assess the knowledge acquired by students over 9 years of schooling and is also used for admission to secondary vocational education institutions (colleges and technical schools). It is one of the three forms of the State Final Attestation (GIA). The Unified State Exam is taken two years later by students graduating from high school, while a separate exam is held for students with disabilities.

== Procedure ==
The procedure for conducting the OGE is determined by the "Procedure for Conducting the State Final Attestation for Educational Programs of Basic General Education". The key provisions of this document are:

1. The OGE consists of four exams – Russian language, mathematics, and two elective subjects.
2. Students who have no academic debts and have completed the curriculum are allowed to take the OGE.
3. To be admitted to the OGE, students must pass the final interview in the Russian language, which is held on the second Wednesday of February and on additional designated days.

In 2021, elective OGE exams were canceled and replaced by a nationwide assessment in the OGE format for one elective subject, conducted within the students' schools. This assessment did not affect the issuance of certificates or final grades. The OGE in Russian language and mathematics remained in their original formats.

In 2020, the exam was not conducted due to the epidemiological situation in the country. Final grades were based on students' annual academic performance.

In 2022, the exams resumed in their pre-COVID format, with more complex tasks compared to previous years. This decision was made due to the decline in COVID-19 cases in 2022.

== Format ==
The format of the exam is related to the USE. Maximum scores for each subject (as of 2025)

- Russian language – 37 points.
- Mathematics (19 in algebra and 12 in geometry) – 31 points.
- Physics – 39 points.
- Chemistry (work with a real experiment) – 38 points.
- Biology – 47 points.
- Geography – 31 points.
- Social Studies – 37 points.
- History – 37 points.
- Literature – 42 points.
- Information and communications technologies – 21 points.
- Foreign languages (English, German, French, Spanish) – 68 points.
- Native Language – 5 points.

The State Final Attestation (GIA) for 9th-grade graduates is assessed at the regional level. Upon successful completion of the exams, students are awarded certificates of basic general education.

In the 2018/19 academic year, ninth-grade students were required to take a total of four final exams: two compulsory subjects (Russian language and mathematics) and two elective subjects chosen from an approved list.

In 2018, a pilot program for the oral part of the Russian language exam, officially called the "Final Oral Interview in Russian Language", was introduced. Passing this oral exam, along with having no annual grades below "satisfactory," is a prerequisite for admission to the main OGE.

Conversion Scale for Primary Exam Scores to the Five-Point Grading Scale (as of 2025)
Subject	Maximum score	Grade "2"	Grade "3"	Grade "4"	Grade "5"	Recommended score for specialized classes
Russian language	37	0–14	15–25	26-32 (at least 6 points for literacy based on criteria GK1–GK4; if less, grade "3")	33-37 (at least 9 points for literacy based on criteria GK1–GK4; if less, grade "4")	28
Mathematics	31	0–7 or 0–21 (with 0–1 points in geometry)	8–14 (at least 2 points in geometry)	15–21 (at least 2 points in geometry)	22–31	Natural Sciences: 18 (at least 6 in geometry); Economics: 18 (at least 5 in geometry); Physics-Mathematics: 19 (at least 7 in geometry)
Physics	39	0–10	11–22	23–34	35–39	31
Chemistry	38	0–9	10–20	21–30	31–38	27
Biology	47	0–12	13–25	26–37	38–47	34
Geography	31	0–11	12–18	19–25	26–31	23
Social studies	37	0–13	14–23	24–31	32–37	29
History	37	0–10	11–20	21–29	30–37	26
Literature	42	0–15	16–25	26–34	35–42	32
Informatics	21	0–4	5–10	11–15	16–21	14
Foreign languages (English, German, French, Spanish)	68	0–28	29–45	46–57	58–68	55

=== Mathematics ===
As of 2024 the mathematics exam is divided into two modules: an algebra module and an geometry module. The minimum required score to obtain a certificate is 8 points. Students must score at least 6 points in the Algebra module and at least 2 points in the Geometry module.

For example, if a student correctly solves 7 tasks from the algebra module but only one from the geometry module, the final certification will not be granted.

The exam consists of two parts:

- Part 1 includes tasks where students need to provide a single answer.
- Part 2 requires detailed, open-ended responses.

The total duration of the exam is 235 minutes.

=== Physics ===
Part 1 of the physics exam includes multiple-choice questions with one correct answer, short-answer tasks, and matching exercises where students must align concepts with corresponding texts. One of the text-based tasks is part of Part 2. In Part 2, students solve problems, conduct a laboratory experiment, and complete a qualitative task that requires a detailed response. The exam duration is 180 minutes.

=== Geography ===
As of 2024, the geography exam consists of 30 questions, including 27 multiple-choice tasks and three extended-response tasks (questions 12, 28, and 29). The exam duration is 150 minutes.

=== Chemistry ===
The chemistry exam is divided into three parts:

- Part 1 includes 19 multiple-choice questions.
- Part 2 features two calculation tasks using chemical formulas; one task for constructing a reaction chain and composing an ionic (short) equation, and one redox reaction (OVR) task.
- Part 3 consists of a science experiment; the student must select reagents, write reaction equations, perform the experiment and then write down the results.

The exam duration is 180 minutes.

=== Russian language ===
The Russian language exam includes multiple-choice questions, full-answer tasks, an essay, and a summary. The exam lasts 235 minutes. Students listen to the summary text from an audio recording provided on a disk attached to the exam materials. Since 2018, a separate oral Russian language exam has also been conducted, with a duration of 15 minutes.

=== Informatics ===
The informatics exam consists of two parts:

- Part 1 contains 10 short-answer questions.
- Part 2 includes five tasks performed using a computer disconnected from the Internet. In two of these tasks, students can choose between different task types (13.1 or 13.2, and 15.1 or 15.2).

In 2022, the entire exam was conducted on computers in Moscow and the Moscow region. Since 2023, some other regions have also introduced the fully computerized version of the exam, known as KOGE. The exam duration is 150 minutes.

=== Social studies ===
As of 2019, the social studies exam consists of two parts:

- Part 1 includes 25 tasks.
  - Questions 1–20 require selecting one correct answer from four options.
  - Question 21 requires comparing two social objects or phenomena (indicating two similarities and two differences).
  - Question 22 is a matching task.
  - Questions 23 and 24 test the ability to work with statistical materials (diagrams or tables).
  - Question 25 assesses the ability to distinguish evaluative judgments from factual statements.
- Part 2 (tasks 26–32) assesses text analysis skills and the ability to find and apply information from a given text.

The exam duration is 180 minutes, and the use of any additional materials is not allowed.

=== Literature ===
The literature exam consists of two parts:

Part 1 includes four tasks:

- Tasks 1 and 2 are based on a fragment of a literary work (epic, lyrical-epic, or dramatic). In Task 1, students are given two questions but need to answer only one. For Task 2, students select another fragment from the same work and answer one of the two provided questions.
- Task 3 involves analyzing a poem, with two questions provided, from which students choose one to answer.
- Task 4 requires comparing the poem from Task 3 with another poem and answering a question based on this comparison.

For all tasks, detailed responses are required, focusing on text analysis without distorting the author's intent or making logical, factual, or language errors. The recommended response length is 3–5 sentences for the first three tasks and 5–8 sentences for the fourth. The maximum score is 6 points for Tasks 1–3 and 8 points for Task 4.

Part 2 requires writing an essay on a literary topic:

- Students choose one topic from five options. The recommended essay length is at least 200 words, but if the essay is under 150 words, it receives 0 points. The essay should fully address the topic, include text-based arguments, avoid factual and logical errors, maintain the author's perspective, and use literary terms appropriately. The maximum score for the essay (Task 5) is 13 points.

Additionally, the exam assesses language proficiency, with up to 6 points awarded for grammar and style.

Throughout the exam, students are allowed to use complete texts of literary works and collections of poetry. The exam duration is 235 minutes.

== Paper forms ==
The Basic State Exam (OGE) utilizes several standardized answer sheets to record students' responses:

- Answer Sheet No. 1: Used for recording short-answer responses. Students fill in designated fields corresponding to specific tasks. Different versions exist depending on the subject, such as mathematics, Russian language, social studies, biology, history, literature, and chemistry.
- Answer Sheet No. 2: Designed for detailed, extended responses. It consists of lined pages where students write comprehensive answers to open-ended questions.
- Additional Answer Sheet No. 2: Provided when students require extra space beyond Answer Sheet No. 2. This sheet follows the same format as the original but is clearly marked as additional.

=== Structure and Filling Instructions ===
All answer sheets must be completed using a black gel or felt-tip pen, and it is strictly prohibited to make any notes or markings on the form's margins. Additionally, you must write carefully so as to not have your answers be counted as incorrect.

==== Answer Sheet No. 1 ====
At the top of Answer Sheet No. 1, students are required to fill out the following information:

- Region Code, Educational Institution Code, Class (number and letter), Exam Center Code, and Classroom Number.
- Subject Code, Subject Name, and Exam Date (in the DD-MM-YY format).
- The student must also sign within a designated rectangular box.

Students must write their Last Name, First Name, and Patronymic in uppercase block letters, placing one letter per square box. Additionally, the series and number of the identification document (such as a passport or birth certificate) are recorded in designated boxes at the top of the sheet.

When filling in responses on Answer Sheet No. 1, students must adhere to a strict character format, displayed at the top of the sheet.

- Task numbers are pre-printed, with a series of boxes aligned horizontally to the right of each number.
- Each letter, digit, or symbol (including commas, periods, hyphens, etc.) must be written in a separate box.
- Writing multiple symbols in one box is not allowed.

==== Correction of Mistakes ====
If a student makes a mistake in the section labeled "Results of Tasks with Short Answers," they must not cross out the incorrect response. In cases where an answer is illegible, incorrect, contains multiple symbols in one box, or a box is left empty, the student should leave the original response unchanged. Instead, they should record the correct answer in the section titled "Correction of Mistaken Answers for Tasks with Short Answers."

In this section:

- Task numbers are not pre-printed.
- Students should write the task number in the first two boxes, followed by a hyphen, and then the correct answer in the boxes that follow.

Answer Sheet No. 1 is scanned and graded by a computer. Failure to follow the specified format may result in misinterpretation of symbols, leading to the answer being marked as incorrect.

==== Answer Sheet No. 2 ====
Answer Sheet No. 2, used for extended responses, has a slightly different structure. At the top, students must enter the Region Code, Subject Code, and Subject Name, similar to Answer Sheet No. 1. Additional fields such as "Reserve – 5," "Answer Sheet No. 2 (Sheet 2)," and "Sheet Number" are filled out in the same format, using uppercase characters and individual boxes.

Below these fields, there is a large blank grid intended for extended answers or detailed solutions.

- Students must continue using a black gel pen for all entries.
- There is no need to maintain the strict character format used in Answer Sheet No. 1 within this section. Instead, students should write their responses clearly and legibly, following the grid layout.
- Students must indicate the task number before writing the answer.
- Rewriting the task instructions is unnecessary.

After completing the response, any remaining empty space on the page should be filled in neatly to prevent tampering. The letter "Z" is commonly used for this purpose, though any consistent pattern is acceptable.

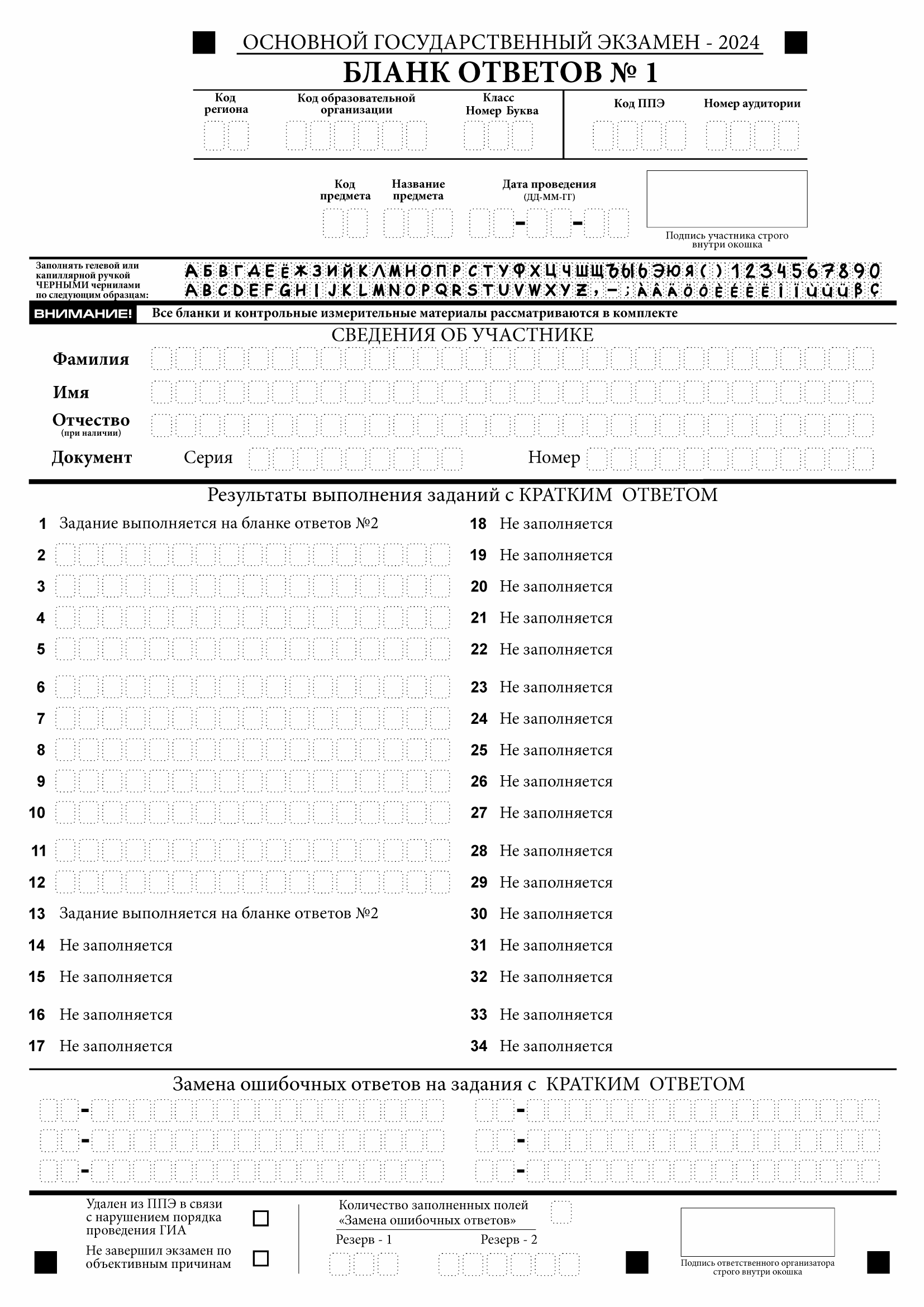
Answer Sheet No. 1 for the Russian Language

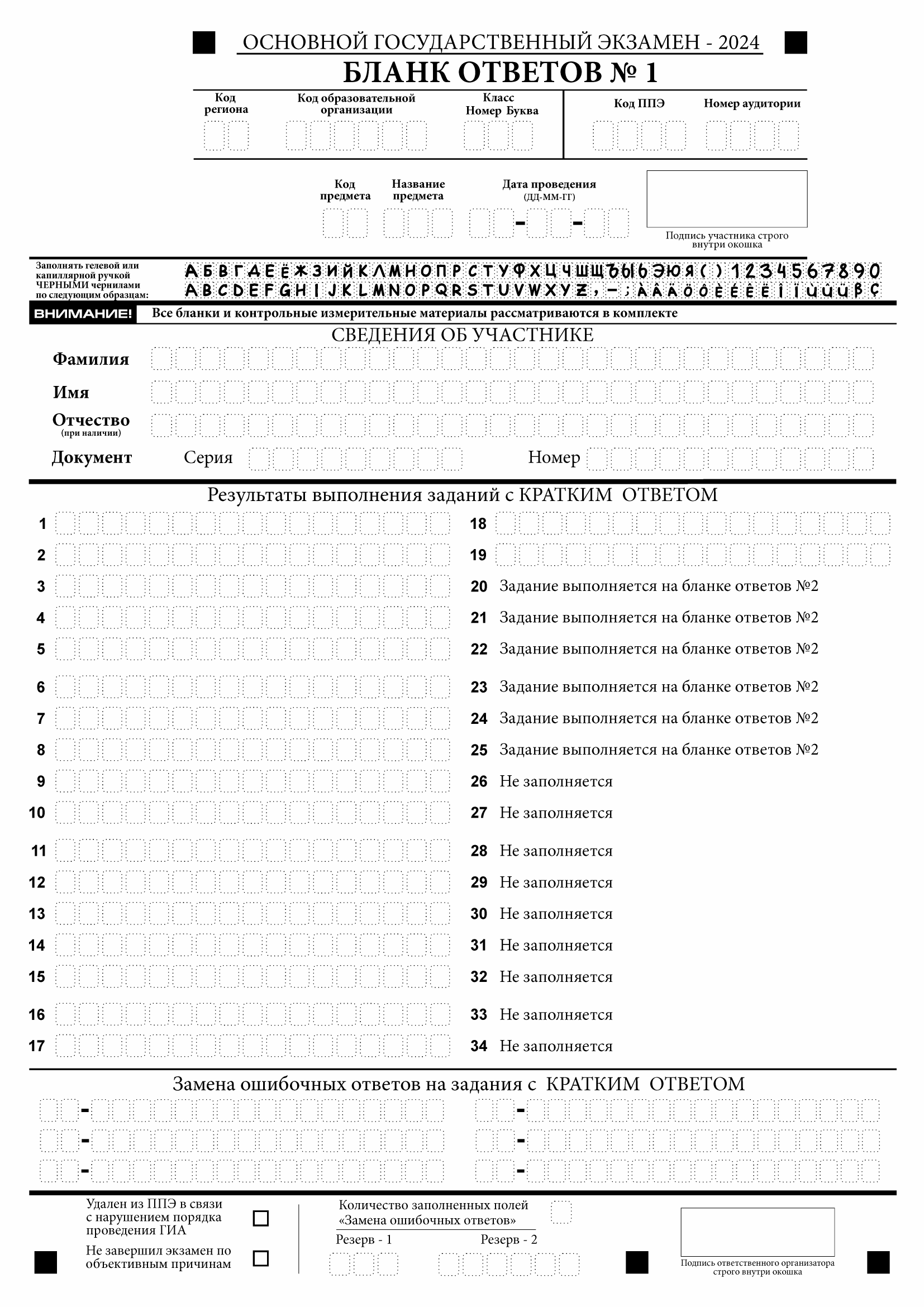
Answer Sheet No. 1 for Mathematics

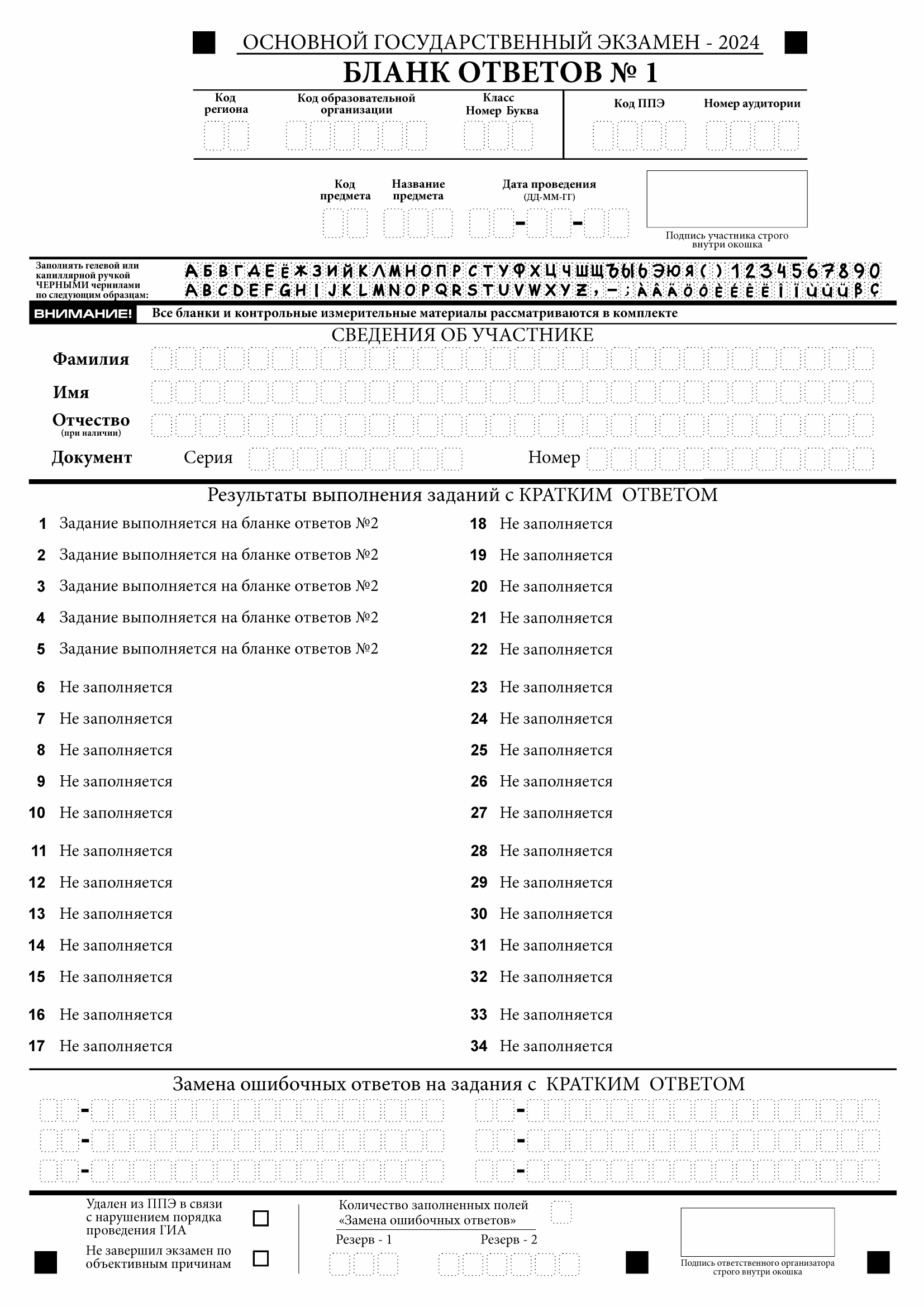
Answer Sheet No. 1 for Literature

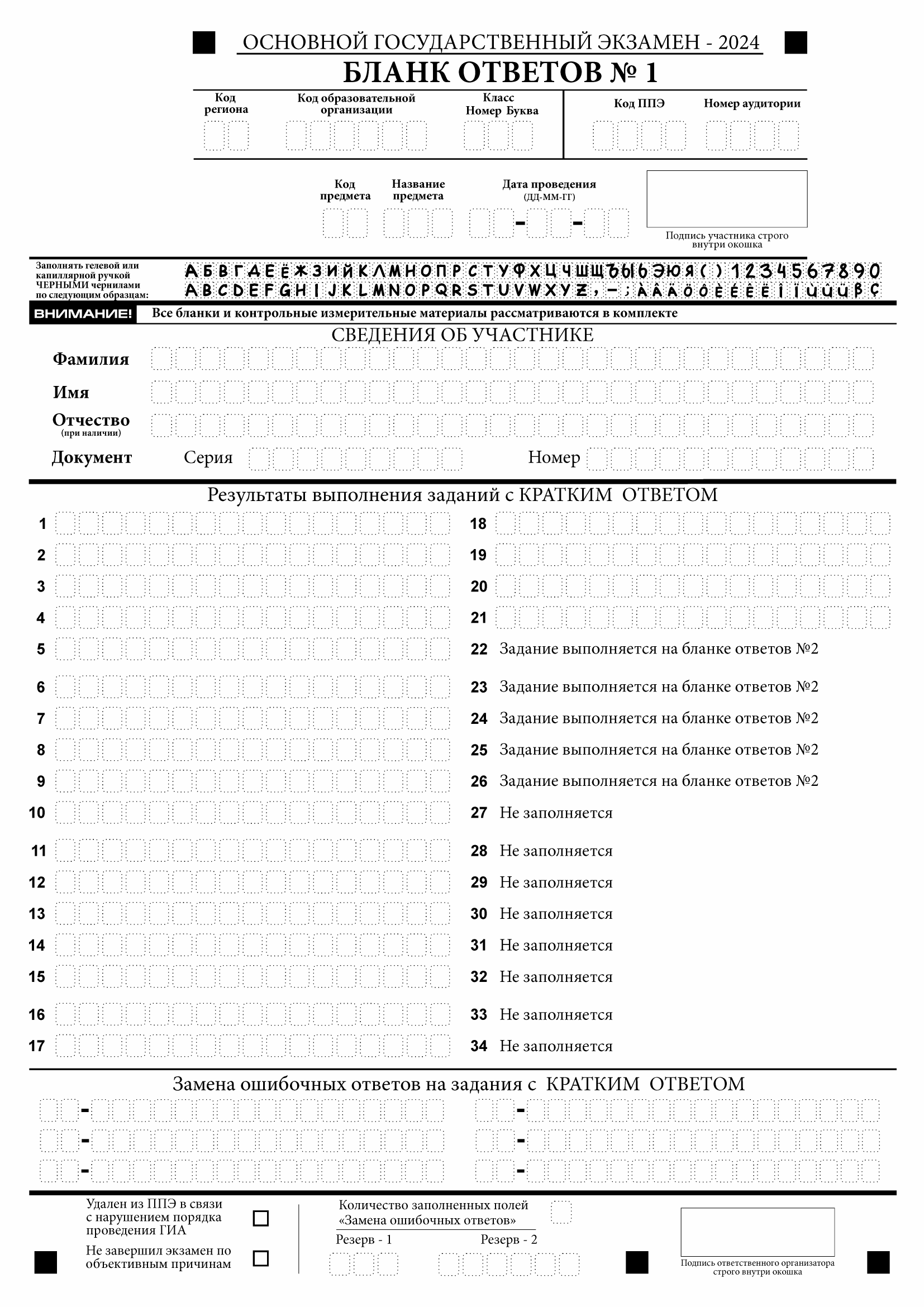
Answer Sheet No. 1 for Biology

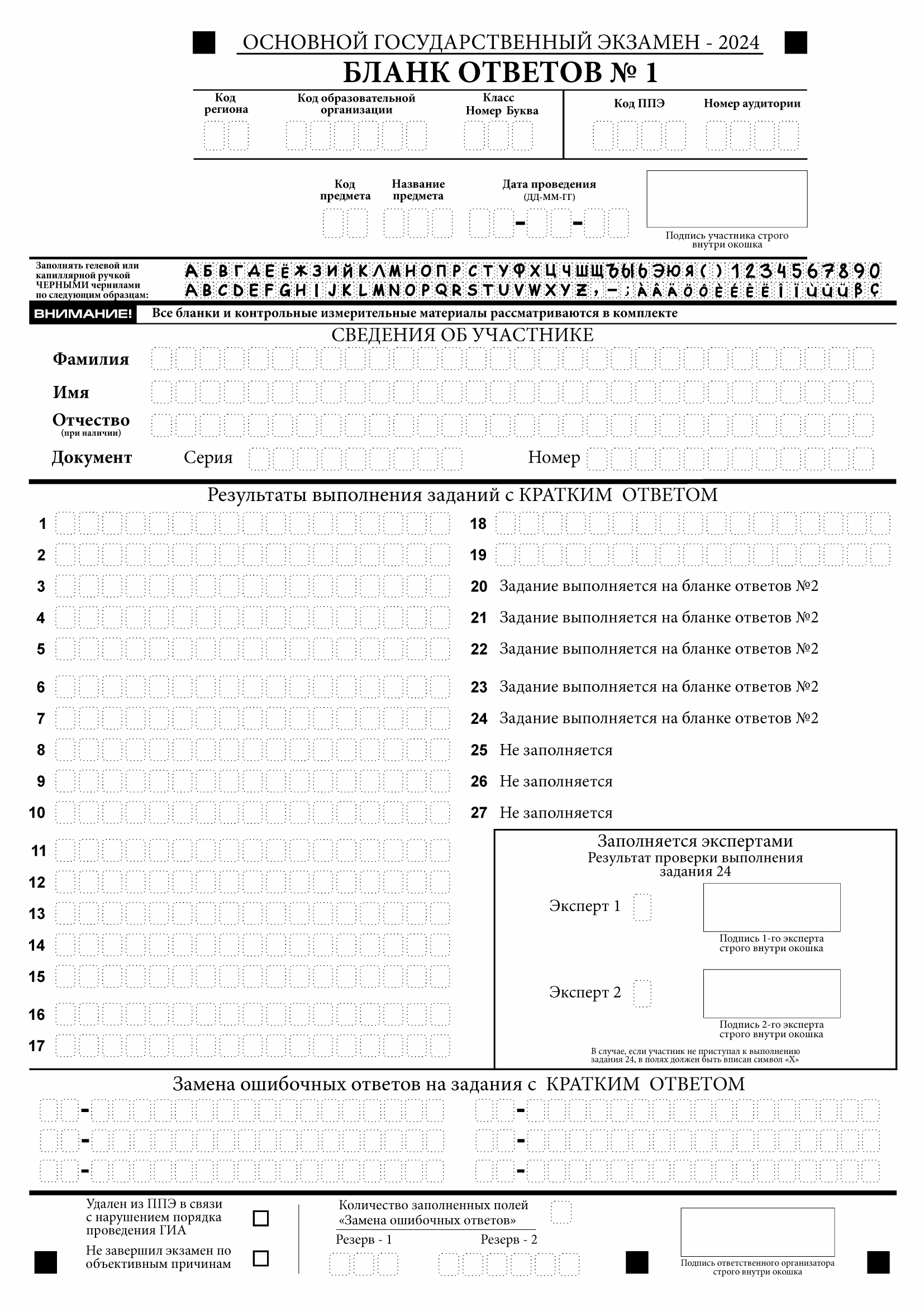
Answer Sheet No. 1 for Chemistry

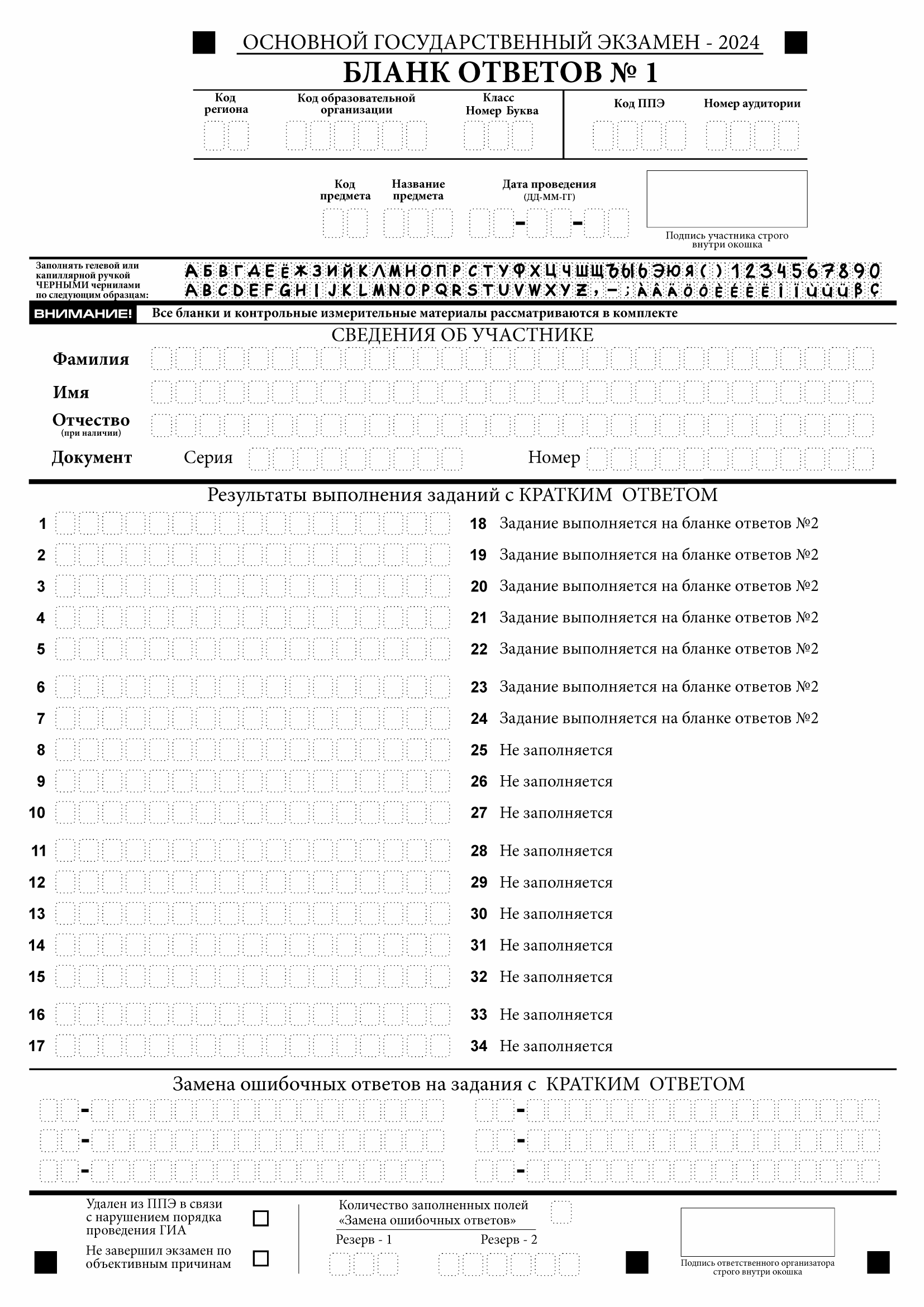
Answer Sheet No. 1 for History

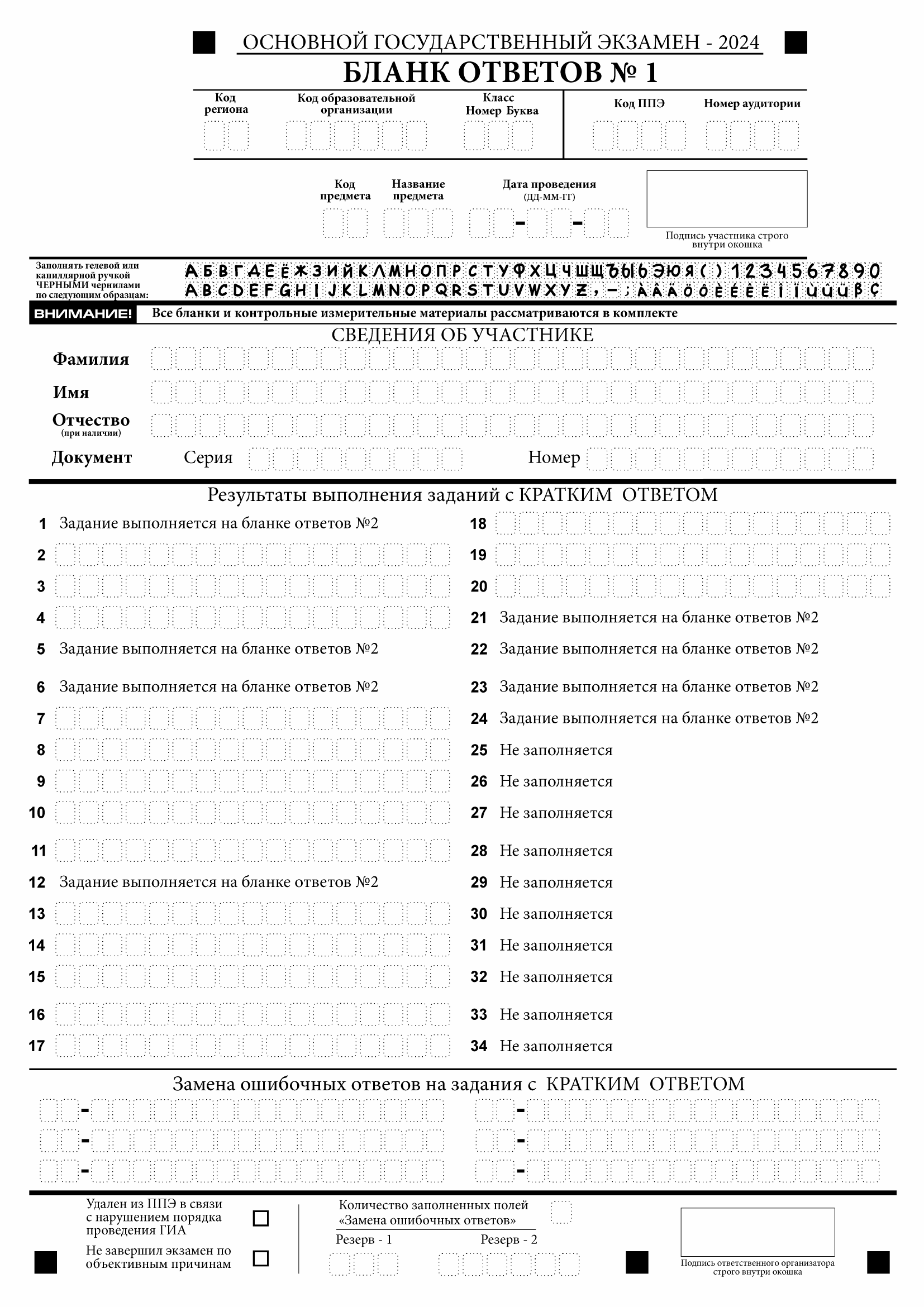
Answer Sheet No. 1 for Social Studies

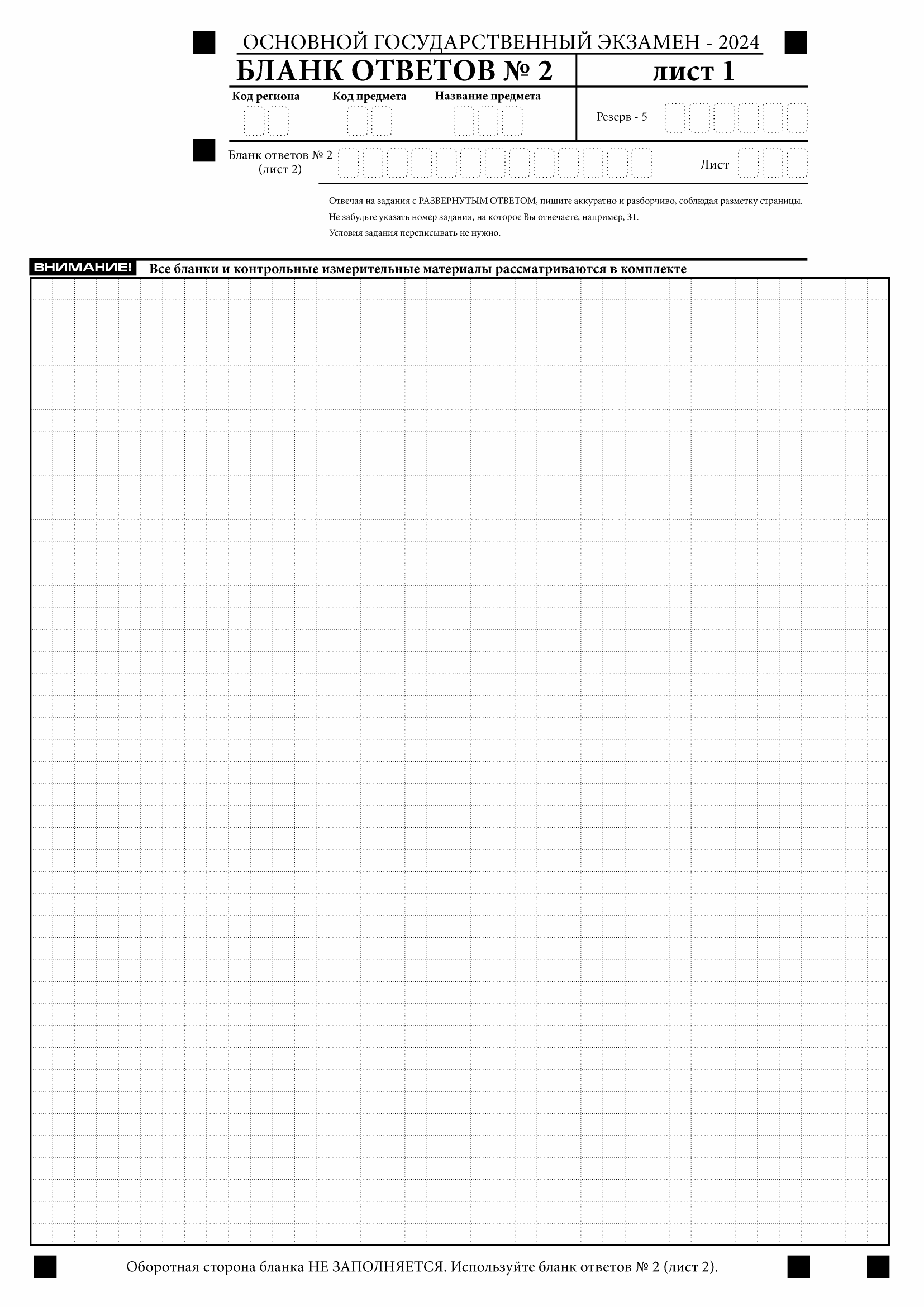
Answer Sheet No. 2, Page 1

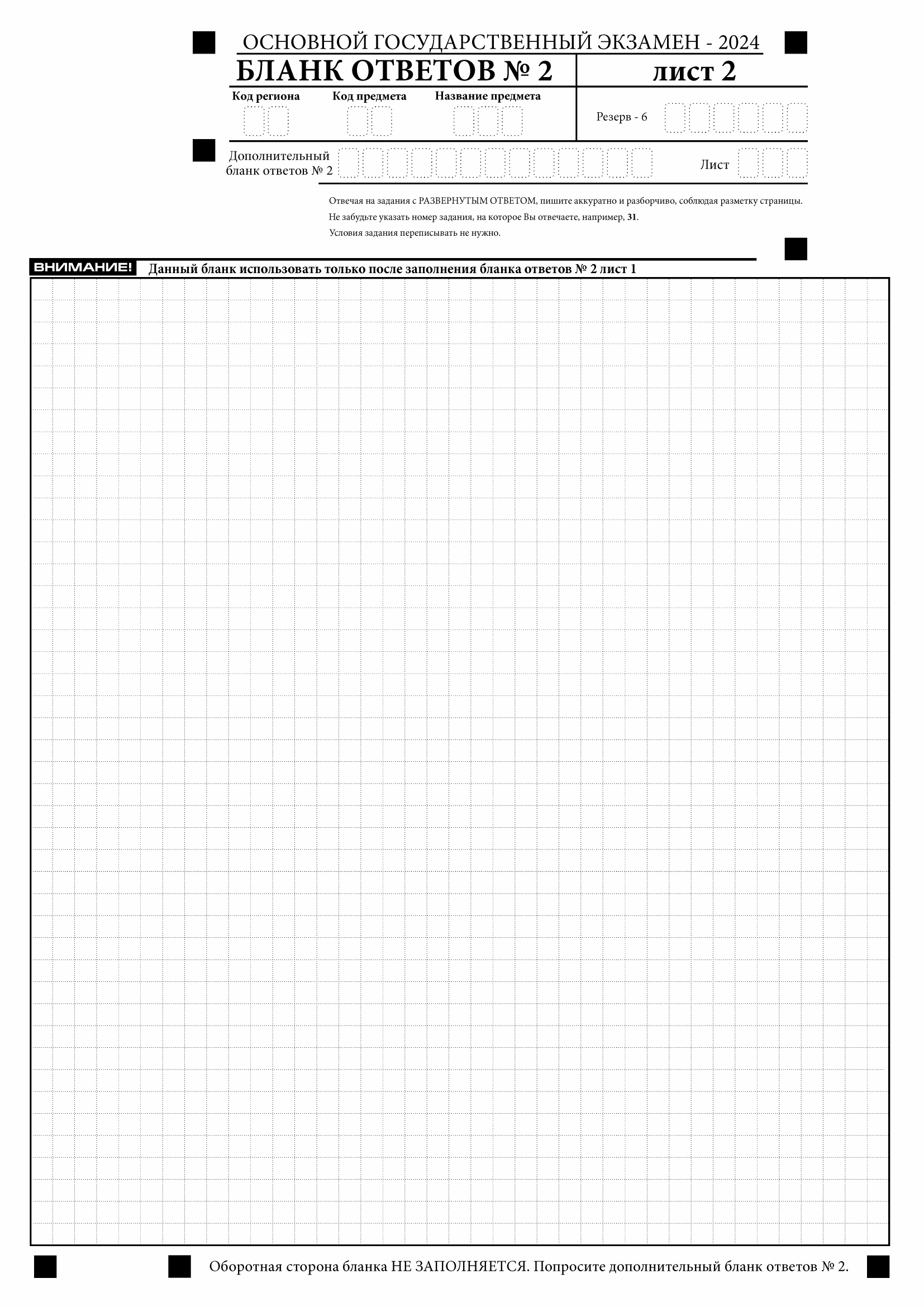
Answer Sheet No. 2, Page 2

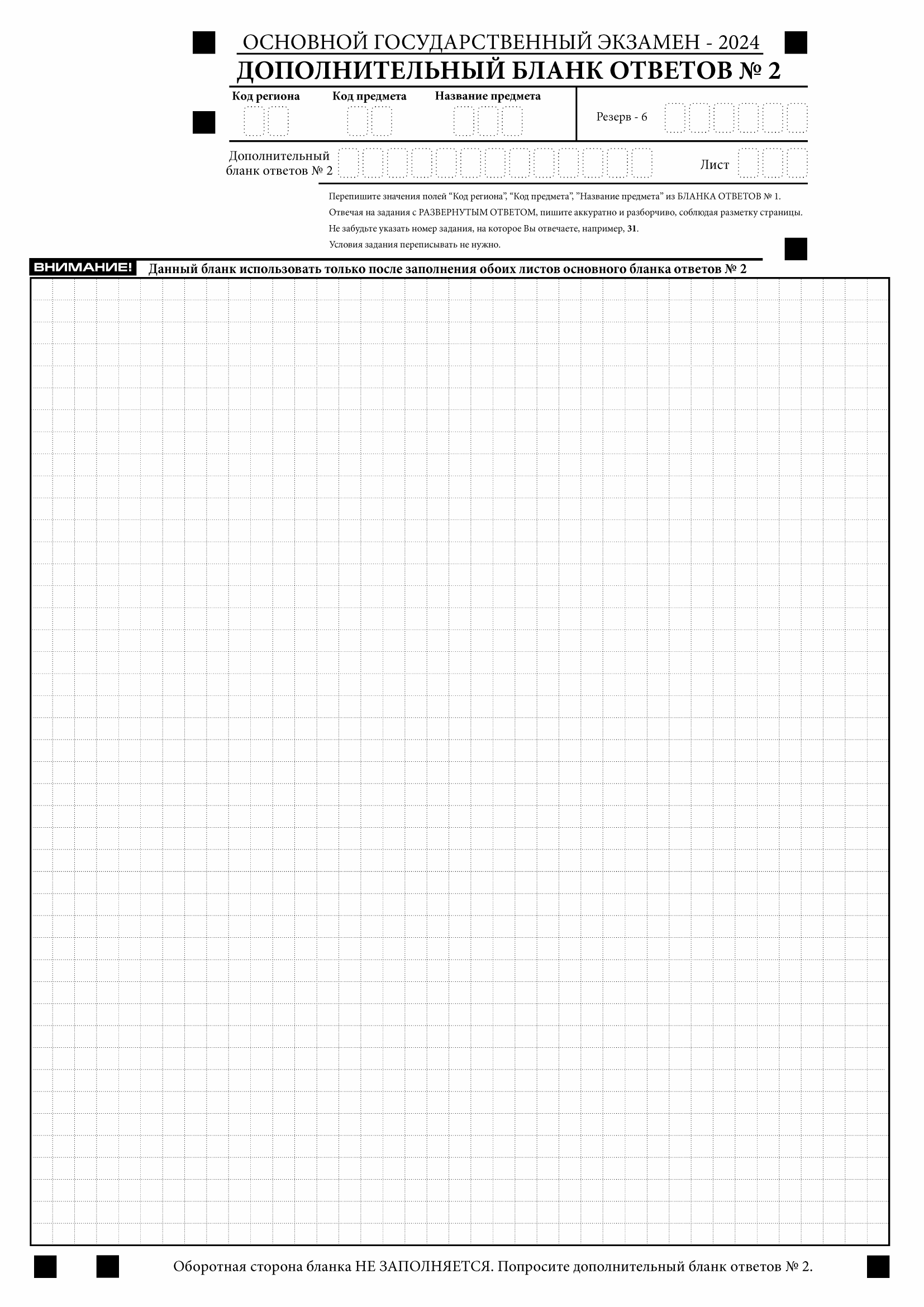
Additional Answer Sheet No. 2

== Examination Periods and Dates ==
The Basic State Exam (OGE) is conducted annually following an official decree from the Ministry of Education and Rosobrnadzor. This decree specifies exam dates, permitted materials, and rules.

=== Registration ===
Students must submit their application to participate in the Basic State Exam (OGE) by 1 March, indicating the intended exam dates.

=== Exam Periods ===
1. Early Period: For students unable to attend the main exam period due to valid, documented reasons such as medical procedures or sports competitions. This period starts no earlier than 20 April.
2. Main Period: The primary examination phase, conducted from May to June, accommodating most students.
3. Additional Period: Designed for students who:
  - Missed the exam for valid reasons (e.g., illness).
  - Scored unsatisfactory results in up to two subjects.
  - Were unable to complete the exam due to emergencies (e.g., damaged answer sheets).

Reserve Days are scheduled after each period to accommodate students with legitimate reasons for missing their original exam dates.

Below is the specific schedule for the 2025 examination period.

Basic State Exam Periods (2025)
Period	Dates (2025)	Eligible Participants
Early Period	23 April – 18 May	Students with valid reasons for early testing (medical reasons, sports events, etc.)
Main Period	21 May – 2 July	All eligible students
Additional Period	3 – 24 September	Students who missed exams or received unsatisfactory results in up to two subjects

Basic State Exam Schedule By Subject (2025)
Subject	Main Period	Early Period	Additional Period
Mathematics	6 June	23 April	3 September
Russian language	3 June	26 April	6 September
Informatics	27 May 10 June, 14 June	3 May	13 September
Literature	14 June	3 May	13 September
Social studies	27 May 10 June	3 May	13 September
Chemistry	27 May 30 May	3 May	13 September
Biology	27 May 14 June	7 May	10 September
Geography	30 May 10 June	7 May	10 September
Foreign languages	21 May 22 May	7 May	13 September
History	30 May	7 May	10 September
Physics	30 May 14 June	7 May	10 September

== Introduction of the OGE ==
Experiments on the introduction of the GIA in Russian language and mathematics have been conducted in various regions of Russia since 2002. Now such a system is used throughout Russia.

== Impact on the Final Grade ==
If a student's annual grade in a subject, based on their quarterly assessments, differs from the exam grade, the final grade recorded in the certificate is the arithmetic mean of the two grades, rounded up to the nearest whole number. For example, if a student has an annual grade of 5 in history but scores 3 on the exam, the final grade in the certificate will be 4. Conversely, if the annual grade is 3 and the exam score is 5, the final grade will also be 4. In another case, if the annual grade is 4 and the exam score is 5, the final grade will be 5. Similarly, if the annual grade is 5 and the exam score is 4, the final grade will still be 5 because the arithmetic mean of 4.5 is rounded up to 5.

If the annual grade is 4 and the exam score is 3, the final grade will be 4. Conversely, if the annual grade is 3 and the exam score is 4, the final grade will still be 4, as the arithmetic mean of 3.5 is rounded up to 4.

For mathematics in the 9th grade, the situation is different: the final grade is determined by the average of the grades in "Algebra," "Geometry," and "Probability and Statistics," along with the exam grade.

== Incidents ==
On 27 May 2024, ninth-grade students in Nizhny Novgorod were unable to take the Basic State Exam (OGE) due to a technical failure in the software system. The exams in informatics, biology, chemistry, physics, and social studies were rescheduled for a backup day, and students had to stand outside for over three hours. The prosecutor's office launched an investigation into the compliance with education legislation.
