= Academic quarter (year division) =

Division of the academic year into four parts

An academic quarter refers to the division of an academic year into four parts, which commonly are not all exactly three months or thirteen weeks long due to breaks between terms.

== Historical context ==
The modern academic quarter calendar can be traced to the historic English law court / legal training pupillage four term system:

British academic term variants
Months	Pupillage	Cambridge	Oxford
January–March	Hilary	Lent	Hilary
April–May	Easter	Easter	Trinity
June–July	Trinity	—	—
October–December	Michaelmas	Michaelmas	Michaelmas

This quarter system was adopted by the oldest universities in the English-speaking world (Oxford, founded circa 1096, and Cambridge, founded 1209).

Over time, Cambridge dropped Trinity Term and renamed Hilary Term to Lent Term, and Oxford also dropped the original Trinity Term and renamed Easter Term as Trinity Term, thus establishing the three-term academic "quarter" year widely found in countries with a lineage to England or the United Kingdom.

Charterhouse, an English independent school, still refers to its three academic terms as "quarters".

== United States ==
=== Background and trends ===
In the United States, quarters typically comprise 10 weeks of class instruction, although they have historically ranged from eight to 13 weeks. Academic quarters first came into existence as such when William Rainey Harper organized the University of Chicago on behalf of John D. Rockefeller in 1891. Harper decided to keep the school in session year-round and divide it into four terms instead of the then-traditional two.

Of the four traditional academic calendars (semester, quarter, trimester, and 4-1-4), the semester calendar is used the most widely, at over 60% of U.S. higher learning institutions, with fewer than 20% using the quarter system. This number has stayed fairly constant since 1930, when 75% of U.S. institutions surveyed indicated they used a semester plan, with 22% on the quarter system.

During the 1960s, a number of U.S. state university systems made a switch from a semester to quarter system, typically in an attempt to accommodate the large number of post-war "baby boom" students who had reached college age (sometimes called the "Tidal Wave I enrollment boom"). A prominent example of this trend was the University of California system, which moved to a quarter system in 1966. Since then, UC Berkeley switched back to semesters in 1983, the new UC Merced branch opened with the semester system, and some UC professional schools have switched back to semesters at various points. In 2020, UC San Diego considered a switch to the semester system as well. At various points since the 1960s, committees have been established and official discussions have taken place within the UC system to discuss a systemwide switch back to the semester system.

In recent years, a number of higher education institutions have considered or approved a switch to a semester system. The University System of Ohio, which includes Ohio State University, Ohio University, and the University of Cincinnati, converted to the semester system in 2012 to better align with other public and private institutions in the state, among other reasons. Individual schools have also switched, like Georgia Tech in 1999. Rochester Institute of Technology converted to semesters in Fall 2013, although the decision was highly controversial, overriding a student vote to remain with quarters. Other institutions and systems that have switched include California State University, Los Angeles, Auburn University, the University of Minnesota system, the Utah State system, and Northeastern University. Southern Oregon University was required to study a switch to the semester system as part of state legislation on a possible merger with the University of Oregon.

=== Arguments for ===
Quarter systems allow students to enroll in a richer variety of courses and school-coordinated internships and may encourage students to take on double majors, minors, concentrations, and the like. A quarter system can maximize the use of college facilities in a time of enrollment growth, as it allows for four regular periods of academic instruction. Also, quarters allow for faculty to engage in terms with a relatively light course load of teaching and greater opportunities for short sabbaticals.

=== Arguments against ===
Concerns over the quarter system include faculty dislike of the brevity of the term, the loss of faculty research and collaboration time, the end of the spring quarter overrunning the start date of many established summer internships which also leads to shorter internship periods, difficulties in recovering from illness-linked absence, and the heavy administrative workload.

A quarter system calendar also may put schools at a disadvantage in competing for prospective students, who wish to keep in-step with friends, and offer more opportunities for students to "disconnect from school."

It can be difficult to transfer credits between semester institutions and quarter institutions, even when they are in the same state.

=== American universities and community colleges on quarter system ===
==== California ====
- California Institute of Technology
- California Polytechnic State University, San Luis Obispo (until fall 2026)
- Loma Linda University
- Pacific Union College
- Santa Clara University
- Stanford University
- University of California - Eight of the ten University of California campuses are on a quarter system. However, the five law schools in the University of California (UC Berkeley School of Law, UC Davis School of Law, UCLA School of Law, UC Irvine Law, and UC Law SF) are on a semester system as is the UCLA David Geffen School of Medicine.
  - University of California, Davis
  - University of California, Irvine
  - University of California, Los Angeles
  - University of California, Riverside
  - University of California, San Diego
  - University of California, San Francisco
  - University of California, Santa Barbara
  - University of California, Santa Cruz
- Foothill College (community college)
- De Anza College (community college)
- Lake Tahoe Community College

==== Colorado ====
- University of Denver

==== Georgia ====
- Savannah College of Art and Design

==== Illinois ====
- DePaul University
- Northwestern University
- University of Chicago

==== Indiana ====
- Rose–Hulman Institute of Technology

==== Louisiana ====
- Louisiana Tech University

==== Massachusetts ====
- Worcester Polytechnic Institute

==== Minnesota ====
- Carleton College

==== New Hampshire ====
- Dartmouth College

==== New York ====
- Union College

==== Ohio ====
- Antioch College

==== Online ====
- Capella University

==== Oregon ====
- Eastern Oregon University
- Oregon Health & Science University
- Oregon Institute of Technology
- Oregon State University
- Portland State University
- Southern Oregon University
- University of Oregon
- Western Oregon University
- Portland Community College
- Lane Community College
- Mt. Hood Community College

==== Rhode Island ====
- New England Institute of Technology

==== Pennsylvania ====
- Drexel University (until August 2027)

==== Washington ====
- Central Washington University
- Eastern Washington University
- Evergreen State College
- Seattle University
- Seattle Pacific University
- University of Washington
  - University of Washington Bothell
  - University of Washington Tacoma
- Walla Walla University
- Western Washington University
- All community and technical colleges.

==== Wisconsin ====
- Milwaukee School of Engineering

== See also ==
- Academic term
- Legal year
