= Academic term =

Subdivision of the academic year at educational institutions

An academic term (or simply term) is a portion of an academic year during which an educational institution holds classes. The schedules adopted vary widely. Common terms such as semester, trimester, and quarter are used to denote terms of specific durations. In most countries, the academic year begins in late summer or early autumn and ends during the following spring or summer.

== Description ==
An academic year is the time during which an educational institution holds classes. An academic term is a portion of the academic year. The schedules adopted vary widely.

=== Types ===
Semester, trimester and quarter are all types of academic terms (the last two being mainly confined to American English), each differentiated by their duration as described below:

- Semester (Latin: sēmestris, lit. 'six monthly') originally German, where it referred to a university session of six months, adopted into American usage in the early 19th century as a half-year term of typically 15 to 18 weeks. Used in the US and other countries to refer to the two main periods into which the academic year is divided at some universities.
- Trimester (Latin: trimestris, lit. 'of three months') used in the US and Canada to refer to one of the three terms into which the academic year is divided at some universities.
- Quarter (Latin: quartarius, lit. 'fourth part of a measure') used in American English to refer to one of four terms into which the academic year is divided at some universities.

== Academic terms by country ==
In most countries, the academic year begins in late summer or early autumn and ends during the following spring or summer. In Northern Hemisphere countries, this means that the academic year lasts from August, September, or October to May, June, or July. In Southern Hemisphere countries, the academic year aligns with the calendar year, lasting from February or March to November or December. The summer may or may not be part of the term system.

=== Australia ===
In most of Australia, the primary and secondary school year lasts about 200 days, from late January or early February to early or mid-December, and is split into four terms:

- Term 1 starts in late January or early February and ends in late March or early April (often in close proximity to Easter).
- Term 2 starts in late April or early May and ends in late June or early July.
- Term 3 starts in mid-to-late July and ends mid-to-late September.
- Term 4 starts in early-to-mid October and ends typically in mid-to-late December.

Terms 4 & 1 (rolled over) and 2 & 3 are respectively usually deemed 'summer' and 'winter' respectively for purposes of sports participation and uniform standards. Australian states and territories vary their approach to Easter when determining the dates for the holiday at the end of Term 1.

The exact dates vary from year to year, as well as between states, and for public and private school. In Tasmania until and including 2012, the school year was split into three terms, the first one being the longest and including an extended Easter holiday (which was also the practice of mainland Australia until the mid-1980s). However, in 2013 Tasmania introduced a four-term year, to conform to the rest of the country. The exact start and finish date of the academic year varies between jurisdictions; in 2023 Queensland will start earliest on 23 January (the only jurisdiction to begin the academic year before Australia Day) and finish earliest on 8 December, while Tasmania will start latest on 8 February and finish latest on 21 December. There is typically a break of two weeks between each term, followed by a 1-2 month summer break after term 4 which ends just before Christmas. This occasionally varies in different jurisdictions/school systems (i.e. some independent schools have a break of three week between terms 1 & 2 and between terms 3 & 4). In the year 2000, due to the 2000 Summer Olympics in Sydney, the state of New South Wales extended the break after Term 3 to three weeks.

Most Australian universities have two semesters a year, but Bond University, Deakin University, CQUniversity, Griffith University, the University of New South Wales and the University of Canberra have three trimesters. Unusually, Macquarie University officially uses the word "session" and CQUniversity uses the word "term" in place of "semester". Many universities offer an optional short summer semester.

=== Austria ===
The Austrian school year for primary and secondary schools is split into two terms, the first one starts on the first Monday in September in the states of Vienna, Lower Austria and Burgenland and on the second Monday of September in Upper Austria, Salzburg, Styria, Carinthia, Tyrol and Vorarlberg. Most schools have holidays between the national holiday on October 26 and All Souls Day on November 2, but those are unofficial holidays not observed by all schools in Austria. Christmas holidays start on December 24 and end on the first weekday after January 6. The first term ends in Vienna and Lower Austria on the first Friday of February, in Burgenland, Carinthia, Salzburg, Tyrol and Vorarlberg on the second Friday of February and in Upper Austria and Styria on the third Friday of February.

There is a one-week break between the two terms. In the second term there are the Easter holidays, the Mayday Holiday on May 1 and the long weekends of Pentecost, Ascension and Corpus Christi. The school year ends in Vienna, Lower Austria and Burgenland on the last Friday of June, in Upper Austria, Styria, Carinthia, Salzburg, Tyrol and Vorarlberg on the first Friday in July.

=== Barbados ===
The Barbadian school year is fashioned after the British system, and as such, it follows a scheduling with three terms per school year.

- First term begins in the second week of September and continues for 15 weeks, ending in mid-December, excluding one week for mid-term break in late October.
- Second term begins in the first week of January and continues for 12 weeks, ending at the end of March.
- Third term begins early/mid-April and continues for 11 weeks until the end of June.

The long school holiday period is 9 to 10 weeks from the end of June until the first week of September.

Trimester	Usual months covered	Breaks after the term
1	2nd week of September - late October	Fall break: one week
1	Early November - mid-December	Winter break: two to three weeks
2	1st week of January - late March	Spring break: two weeks
3	Early/mid April - late June	Summer break: nine to ten weeks, separates one school year from another

=== Brazil ===
In Brazil, due to the Law of Directives and Bases of Brazilian Education, the academic year must have 200 days, both at schools and at universities. The school year usually begins during the first week of February. There is a 2-week/4-week long winter break in July. The Brazilian school year ends the first week of December, summer in Brazil.

Most schools use the 4 term system, called "unidades" or "bimestres" (units, bimesters), although there is a minority of schools that utilize a 3 term system instead, composed of trimesters (trimestres).

In Brazilian universities academic terms are defined as periods or semesters (período, semestre). There are two semesters: February to June and August to December. The majority of academic degrees courses are 8 semesters (four years) long or 10 semesters (five years) long.

=== Bangladesh ===
In Bangladesh, the kindergarten, elementary and schools follow the semester system. Most of the universities follow the semester system although for some particular subjects such as Law they follow a yearly system. Business schools of all public and private universities follow a semester or trimester system.

Some of the universities using a two-semester system (using "Term 1" and "Term 2" designations) include: Bangladesh University of Engineering and Technology, Khulna University of Engineering and Technology, Chittagong University of Engineering and Technology, Rajshahi University of Engineering and Technology, Shahjalal University of Science and Technology, Ahsanullah University of Science and Technology, Bangladesh Agricultural University, Khulna University, Jagannath University, Jessore University of Science and Technology, International Islamic University Chittagong and Sylhet Agricultural University.

Some of the universities following a trimester system (using "Spring", "Summer" and "Fall" designations) include: Independent University Bangladesh, Northern University Bangladesh, American International University - Bangladesh, BRAC University, Daffodil International University, East West University, Fareast International University, North South University, Presidency University, Prime University, Stamford University, Military Institute of Science and Technology, University of Information Technology and Sciences, University of Development Alternative (UODA), Bangladesh University of Business and Technology and United International University.

=== Belgium ===
In Belgium, kindergarten, elementary and secondary schools begin on September 1 and end on June 30.

Schools also take breaks/holidays:

- Autumn break: One week at the start of November
- Christmas break: Two weeks around Christmas and New Year
- Carnival break: One week in February.
- Easter break: Two weeks around Easter.
- Summer break: is always the break from 1 July until 31 August
- Ascension break: Thursday and Friday in early May to mid June
- Labor Day: May 1
- Whitsun: Monday in mid May to late June
- Armistice Day: November 11

Universities and colleges in Belgium use the semester system, dividing the academic year in two equal parts of fourteen weeks of courses. Universities start the first semester in the third week of September, and no 'autumn break'. Colleges start one week earlier, in the second week of September, giving them right to the 'autumn break' of one week. After 13 weeks of courses the 'Christmas break' starts (around December 20), which is used to study for the 3–4 weeks of examinations in January.

After these examinations the universities have one week of vacation, the so-called 'semestrial vacation', while the colleges start the classes of the second semester at the end of January, immediately after the examinations, which week they reclaim with the 'spring break' at the end of February, which the universities do not have. The universities start the second semester in the beginning of February.

Both universities and colleges have the 'Easter break', which again is used to study for the examinations in June. After Easter, the classes start again until the end of May, followed by four weeks of examinations in June, after which three months of vacation is given. The students who failed in passing some of the courses in their curriculum in January and June, the so-called 'first session', have to do the examinations again in the second session at the end of August.

=== Cambodia ===
In Cambodia the school year kindergarten sectors in public schools consists of 10 months with a two-month vacation, while in primary, and secondary sectors, it is divided into two semesters and each semester is divided into 2 quarters. The first of November is the start of the academic term. After the 1st semester, a small vacation when the school is halted and at the end of the Second Semester, a 2-month vacation until the start of the new year. In universities, it is divided into 4 years.

=== Canada ===
Education being a provincial responsibility, there is no Canadian national standard. In Canada, the school year for elementary and high school consists of 178 to 200 days, depending on the jurisdiction, but several days may be deducted from this total for professional development and administrative duties, resulting in approximately 187 teaching days per year for most jurisdictions. Elementary students receive approximately 950 hours of instruction and secondary students receive approximately 1000 hours per year.

Generally in English Canada, secondary schools run on a two-semester arrangement, also known as fall and spring semester, the first semester running from the day after Labour Day in September to January and the second running from February until the Thursday before the last Friday in June. The semesters are often divided into two terms each.

Quarter	Usual months covered	Breaks after the quarter
1	Early September - early/mid October	Fall (Thanksgiving) break: 3 days (Thanksgiving Day weekend)
2	Early/mid October - mid/late December	Winter (Christmas) break: approximately two weeks
2	January	(none)
3	February - late March	Spring (March) break: approximately one week
4	April - late June	Summer break: approximately two months and separates one school year from another

Some schools in Canada run on a trimester system, the first running from September to January, the second from January to March or April, and the third from March or April until June. The trimester is more common in elementary and middle schools (Kindergarten – Grade 8) than in high schools (Grade 9 – Grade 12). Most of those characteristics differ in Québec, where education is, with the exception of a few school boards, given in French. By tradition, Quebec and Franco-Ontarian elementary and secondary schools arrange timetables to ensure the school year ends before June 24, date of the St-Jean-Baptiste day celebration, a traditional holiday.

Most universities and colleges usually run from early September until the end of April or early May. Often, this winter session is split into two terms running September to December and January to April. Various forms of summer studies may be offered May to August. Some, such as University of Waterloo and Simon Fraser University, run a full tri-semester system, providing full courses during summer. There are a few school boards in Canada experimenting with year-round schooling.

=== Chile ===
In elementary school, high school, as well as in universities, Chilean education is divided into two semesters. The first one starts early March and lasts until late June and the second starts in early August and finishes in mid-December; also, some universities offer a summer period from early January to mid-February but just for exceptional courses. These semesters have breaks for public festivities, such as Easter, independence commemoration (from two days to two weeks in September depending on year and place) and some public holidays like labour day, among others.

=== China ===
In the People's Republic of China, elementary, middle and high schools from the public education have two semesters, the first from September to January, and the second from February or March, depending on the date of Chinese New Year, to July.

Most universities and colleges in China also uses the two-semesters system, while a small portion of Chinese universities, such as Shanghai University, are experimenting with the quarter system.

From January to February or March is the Winter break or Lunar New Year break. Summer break is normally from July to the end of August.

In Northern China, the winter break is longer and the summer break is shorter; the opposite applies in Southern China.

There are some casual holiday breaks:

- New year holiday: from 1 Jan. to 3 Jan.
- Lunar New year holiday: In Jan. or Feb. It lasts for around four weeks.
- Qingming Festival: Set according to the solar term. Usually on April 4 or 5.
- Labor's Day: 1 May to 5 May.
- Dragon Boat Festival: Set according to Lunar Calendar. Usually about May and June.
- Mid-autumn Festival: Set according to Lunar Calendar. Usually about middle of September.
- National Day: From 1st Oct. to 7 Oct for Chinese students.

=== Costa Rica ===
In Costa Rica the school year runs for ten months. It starts in the first week of February and ends in the last week of November. There is a mid-term vacation of approximately 2 weeks in July, and most schools also observe "Easter Week" in March or April.

=== Czech Republic ===
In the elementary and high schools in the Czech Republic, the school year usually runs from September 1 to June 30 of the following year.

It is divided into two semesters with breaks on public holidays such as St. Vaclav (September 28), Independence day (October 28, two days break), Velvet Revolution (November 17), Christmas (9–12 days break), Spring break (1 week break), Easter (three days break on Maundy Thursday, Good Friday and Easter Monday) and finally Labour day (May 1) and Liberation day (May 8). After the end of school year on June 30, the Summer holidays follow until September 1 when a new school year starts. Sole exception to this is the final year at high schools, which ends with Graduation of students at the end of May.

Universities have two mid-terms. The academic year starts usually in the second half of September or in the beginning of October. (It depends on university.) Bachelor's degree is normally obtained by students after 3 years and masters after another 2 years of study. Still, there are some exceptions (e.g. medicine takes 6 years, no bachelor's degree).

=== Denmark ===
In schools in Denmark, the school year runs from August to June. In universities, the academic year runs from around September 1 to June 30, and is often divided into an autumn semester (with January set aside for exams) and a spring semester (with June set aside for exams). Since 2004, some Danish universities and faculties divide the academic year into four quarters, each of which may consist of eight weeks and an exam week, and being separated from the next quarter by a one-week break.

=== Estonia ===
In Estonia, elementary and high schools begin on 1 September and end in the beginning of June. The school year is divided into trimesters (or quarters) that last about three months. Summer is usually counted as a term break, although the beginning of June is still part of the third trimester. Universities start on the first Monday of September and usually end in the middle of May or in the beginning of June; though in reality, exam periods may continue until the end of June (e.g. University of Tartu).

=== Ethiopia ===
In Ethiopia, almost all elementary, secondary, and college classes are conducted on a two-semester timetable. The first semester of the year is from September to late January or mid February. The second semester usually begins some two weeks after the end of the first and ends in late May or mid June.

=== Finland ===
In the elementary and secondary schools and college, the academic year is divided in semesters. The autumn semester begins in mid-August and is suspended a few days before Christmas. The classes continue after the Epiphany with the spring semester which finishes at the beginning of June.

=== France ===
In primary and secondary schools, the school year begins the first Monday of September, unless September 1 is on Sunday. The school year is divided into 5 terms. The first from September to October, the second from November to December, the third from January to February, the fourth from March to April, and the fifth from May to June.

Breaks are scattered throughout the school year every 6, 7 or 8 weeks and last 2 weeks each:

- Toussaint Break The first break is around the 18th of October.
- Christmas Break Christmas Break starts around the 19th of December
- Winter Break Winter Break dates differ of the Academia's location, which could be in Zone A, B, or C, to avoid high traffic on the road. It usually starts in February, ends late February or early March.
- Easter Break Easter Break depends on the location of Academia. It starts in April, and ends late April or early May.
- End of Academic term - Summer Break In primary school, end of Academic term is early July. In secondary school (middle school or high school) end of Academic term is before Middle School Exam in late June, or Baccalaureat, in mid-June.

On Mondays, Tuesdays, Thursdays, and Fridays, pupils have a full day of teaching from around 8:30 a.m. until around 4:30 p.m. On Wednesday mornings, some pupils may have supplementary classes. French pupils used to attend school on Saturdays, but the so-called "four-days week" has been implemented since September 2008, reducing the teaching year from 936 to 864 hours (above the European average of 800 hours, but below the UK minimum of 950 hours for state schools). Additional holidays include Veterans Day on November 11, May 8, Ascension Day, May Day on May 1, and Easter Monday.

=== Germany ===
==== Schools in Germany ====
The school year in Germany begins between late July and early September, and ends from mid-June to July, with a summer break of similar length to that in the UK (only 6 weeks) but much shorter than in some other countries (with up to 3 months). The summer vacation starts in a different week by state (there are 16 federal states including Berlin, Hamburg and Bremen). The school year includes five shorter breaks or holidays:

German school holidays
Semester	Usual months covered	Corresponding break
1	August–October	Fall break: 1–2 weeks
1	November–December	Christmas break: 2 weeks
1	January–February	Winter or Carnival break: 0–2 weeks
2	March–April	Easter break: 2 weeks
2	April–May	Pentecost break: 0–2 weeks
2	June–July	Summer break: 6 weeks

Due to Germany's federal structure, all breaks may differ depending on the state. The exact dates for the beginning and the end of school breaks are kept different state by state and changed every year. This is meant to keep holiday traffic as low as possible.

The school year is divided into two parts (September to February & February to July). There is not necessarily any break between those two parts, but pupils get a semi-year school report (it only displays their current level and is not relevant for promotion).

==== Universities in Germany ====
German universities run two semesters with the start and end dates depending on the university. The Wintersemester (WiSe or WS), during which most students start university, often goes from 1 October until 31 March, with lectures starting around 15 October and lasting 14 weeks. There is usually a two-week break around Christmas and New Year (which is not counted in the 14 weeks). The Sommersemester (SoSe or SS) consequently usually goes from 1 April until 30 September with lectures starting some time after Easter and lasting 12 weeks. The two lecture-free periods of 12 to 14 weeks between the semesters are for taking exams, doing internships, lab courses, and employment.

The University of Mannheim changed its schedule to conform with US standards in Fall of 2006. The semesters there are now from August 1 to January 31 (Herbst-/Wintersemester) and from February 1 to July 31 (Frühjahrs-/Sommersemester).

===== Universities of applied sciences =====
Fachhochschulen start both semesters one month earlier than other universities.

===== Vocational-cooperative universities =====
Berufsakademien have four quarters, January to March and so on. In alternating quarters, the students attend the university and intern at the employer (the latter being the "Praxisphase"). The number of lessons per week is significantly higher than at normal universities (equivalent to a full-time job) and the exams cannot be during the "free time" of the year, as that time is spent in the company. Vacation is given according to labor laws, i.e. half of 20–30 days (because only half of the year is worked).

=== Guyana ===
The school year in Guyana usually begins in September and ends in July of the following year. It has three terms: Christmas (First), Easter (Second) and August (Third), with two to three weeks break for Christmas and Easter and 6 to 7 weeks during the August term.

=== Honduras ===
The school year in Honduras runs from the first week of February to the end of November, with a one-week break during Easter, and a week break in October. Depending on the university, some do trimester and others in quarters. Breaks may vary.

=== Hong Kong ===
In Hong Kong, the academic year usually runs from September 1 to mid-July for most primary and secondary schools. For senior secondary student, they usually start their academic year from mid of August or late August. Some secondary schools have two terms, but most have three terms. For universities and other tertiary institutions the academic year usually runs from September or October to April or May, sometimes with an extra summer term roughly from May to July.

Kindergartens often operate a semester (two-term) system, divided by the lengthy (e.g. two-week) break for Chinese New Year, typically in early February.

=== Hungary ===
In the elementary and high schools in Hungary, the school year usually runs from September 1 to June 15 of the next year, with variation if these dates fall on Saturday or Sunday. The school year (tanév) is usually split into two semesters (félév). These semesters are also divided, with some schools holding examinations each half-semester. The first semester runs from September 1 until the middle of January and is divided by the fall vacation, which is around All Saints' Day and lasts for a week. The second semester is closed at the end of the school year. It is divided by the Easter holiday, which usually consist of the weekend before Easter and the holiday itself. Apart from these vacations and national celebrations, a few schools have 'skiing holidays' (síszünet), the date of which varies from the middle of January until February, though some schools hold it in December. Its length also varies from one school to another. It is made so that the students of the school who partake in the skiing camp of the school need no verification of absence. In the last school year of secondary education, the Matura examinations (school-leaving exam and entrance exam for university admissions; similar to A-level exams in the UK) are administered from May through July.

Hungarian universities run two semesters. They are typically from the first or second week of September to the middle of December (fall semester (őszi félév)) and from February to the middle of May (spring semester (tavaszi félév)). Both semesters are followed by an examination period. During the winter exam period, a break of 1–2 weeks is administered between Christmas and the beginning of the new year. In addition to the break between the semesters in summer, there is typically a break including Christmas and New Year. Some universities also have a fall and an Easter (spring) vacation.

=== India ===
In elementary and secondary schools, the academic year in some part is April to March and others June to May. The summer vacations start from the beginning of May and last up to the middle or end of June. There is also a winter vacation of 1–2 weeks at the beginning of the year. However, in the Eastern and southern states like West Bengal and Karnataka there will be two breaks, one for Dussehra or Diwali in October which ranges from 7 to 15 days and another for Christmas and New Year in late December and early January which ranges from 7 to 15 days. The entire academic year lasts for around 30 weeks.

A semester system is being implemented in most of the universities in India as directed by the University Grants Commission. In universities the academic year is from July to May. There is a mid-year break during summer, usually from the end of May to the start of July. Some universities also have an autumn break or Diwali break around October/November. This is generally right before the second semester exam in November or in the middle of the second semester.

All students move from old to the new academic year after the completion of the final examinations for the previous year with a small break of 1–3 weeks for compilation of results.

=== Indonesia ===
An academic year in Indonesia is divided to two terms, running from mid-July to December and January to mid-June. For universities, however, the terms are much shorter, running from September to December and February to May. Some universities provide a summer semester (called the short semester) from June to August. During president Abdurrahman Wahid's term, schools are closed for Ramadan and a week after Eid-ul-Fitr (Idul Fitri). Some schools implement Saturday-off. Previously, academic year starts from January to December, but this rule changed in 1985.

=== Iran ===
In Iran, the academic year runs from September to June (10 months). Some universities, however, offer a limited number of courses in summer. Students have a three-month summer vacation. All schools are closed during Nowruz from march 20 until the beginning of April to celebrate the Iranian new year. The first (fall) semester begins on the first day of the Persian Calendar month of Mehr equivalent to the first day of autumn in the Northern Hemisphere and ends in January. The second (spring) semester begins in the winter and ends in June. No mid-term break exists in the academic calendar.

=== Ireland ===
The primary school year runs from the beginning of September until the end of June. There are two two-week long breaks for Christmas and Easter and two mid-term breaks at the end of October and mid-February, both one week long. Secondary schools run from September to the end of May, but due to the Junior Certificate and Leaving Certificate exams, 3rd and 6th years respectively break at the end of June for summer holidays upon completion of the exams which end in the 3rd week of June. The academic year for schools in receipt of public funding lasts for a minimum of 167 teaching days in secondary schools and 183 days in primary schools.

Third-level institutions generally from early September to December for their first term. The second term usually runs from January to Easter and the third term from Easter to mid- or late May. There are two common approaches to organising semesters: One, e.g. at Trinity College Dublin (TCD) and NUI Galway, is to align the first semester with the first term (Michaelmas at TCD) and then split the second semester over the second term (Hilary at TCD) and third term (Trinity at TCD). The other approach, e.g. at University College Dublin, is for the first semester to start at the start of the first term and continue after Christmas for a few weeks of the second term and for the second semester to start immediately after this in the middle of the second term, without a break, run through the rest of the second term, and continue after Easter through to the end of the third term.

=== Israel ===
==== Public education in Israel ====
The school year in Israel starts in elementary, middle, and high schools on September 1, and lasts until the end of June for elementary schools, and until June 20 for middle and high schools. There are no fixed holidays of equal length, with breaks occurring on national holidays, usually lasting two or three days. For Jews, there is a nine-day break for Sukkot (autumn); a seven-day break for Hannukah (in December); and for Passover (spring) the break is 2–3 weeks long. For the Muslim population, breaks are taken for Eid al-Adha, Eid ul-Fitr and end of semester breaks.

The university academic year typically divides into two semesters which start after Sukkot (typically mid to late October) and end in June or July. Some academic institutions also enable a third semester in the summer.

The short breaks:

- Eid ul-Fitr: the end of Ramadan, three- to five-day break, according to the lunar calendar (only in Islamic schools).
- Eid al-Adha: the end of Hajj, four-day break, according to the lunar calendar (only in Islamic schools).
- Rosh Hashanah: three-day break; the break is sometime between September 4 and October 6.
- Yom Kippur: two-day break; the break is sometime between September 13 and October 15. (see note below from 2012).
- Sukkot: nine-day break in late September or in October.
- Purim: three-day break, the break in late February or early March.
- Yom Ha'atzmaut: one-day break, the break in late April or early May. The previous day, Yom Hazikaron, is a half day.
- Lag BaOmer: one-day break, the break in early May or mid-May.
- Shavuot: three-day break, the break in late May or early June.

The school year in Israel is divided into two semesters:

- Semester 1: From 1 September to late January or early February.
- Semester 2: From late January or early February to late June.

Until 2011, the summer break ended on August 31, but in 2011 Israeli ministry of education decided to shorten the summer break by one week and the break now ends on August 26 as of 2012. In 2014, the old schedule was reinstated so that the summer break is back to August 31. The period between Yom Kippur and Sukkot was added as holiday to compensate for this but as of 2014, has consequently been removed.

==== Yeshivas ====
In most Yeshivas, the year is divided into three periods (terms) called zmanim. Elul zman starts from the first day of the Hebrew month of Elul and extends until the end of Yom Kippur. This is the shortest (approx. six weeks), but most intense semester as it comes before the High Holidays of Rosh Hashanah and Yom Kippur. Winter zman starts nine days after Sukkot and lasts until 15 days before Passover, a duration of five months (six in a Jewish leap year). Summer semester starts after Passover and lasts until Tisha B'Av, a duration of about three months. During the interim periods, which are called bein hazmanim (between the terms), students are on vacation.

=== Italy ===
In Italy, all schools start in the first half of September, even though the exact beginning date changes every year. For schools from primary schools to high schools, the academic year is split into two semesters:

- First semester: from September to January;
- Second semester: from February to the beginning of June.

Semester	Quarter	Usual months covered	Breaks after the quarter
1	1	September - October 31	Fall (All Saints' Day) break: November 1
1	2	November 2 - mid/late December	Winter (Christmas) break: approximately two weeks
1	2	January	(none)
2	3	February – late March or early/mid April	Spring (Easter) break: approximately one week
2	4	After Easter break to early June	Summer break: approximately three months and separates one school year from another

Kindergartens usually follow a similar schedule.

A university academic year is slightly different because of exams. University academic year divides into:

- First semester: from the beginning of October to the end of February. Some courses begin as early as September. Throughout January and February, there are usually no lessons, only exams.
- Second semester: from the beginning of March to the end of July. Throughout the second half of May and the months of June and July, there are also no lessons in most universities, only exams.

Even though September is a free month, it is officially an exam month in all Italian universities. It means that it is possible to take exams. During every exam session (January–February, May–June–July or September), students are usually allowed to take any exam of their previous carrier that they couldn't pass and even a certain number of exams of the new academic year (credit limit for this last option).

==== Public holidays in Italy ====
On the following holidays, no lessons take place:

- Carnival (particularly Mardi Gras) — usually on February;
- Easter - date changing every year, usually in March or April and lasting 5–7 days;
- Liberation Anniversary — on the 25th April;
- Labour Day — on the 1st May;
- Anniversario della Repubblica (Anniversary of the Republic) — on the 2nd June;
- Tutti i Santi (All Saints) — on the 1st November;
- Immacolata concezione (Immaculate Conception) — on the 8th December;
- Christmas, New Year's Eve and Epiphany — from 23 December to 6 January (included)

=== Japan ===
In Japan, most of the schools run a three-term school year (trimester system). The exact date of the beginning of the summer break and its duration vary across regions, but commonly the break lasts for about five weeks. The break originated to avoid the heat in summer, so elementary, middle, and high schools in Hokkaidō and Nagano Prefecture tend to have a (slightly) shorter summer break than the rest of schools in Japan.

Trimester	Usual months covered	Breaks after the trimester
1	April - late July	Summer break: approximately five weeks
2	September - early/mid-October	Fall break (Health & Sports Day weekend): three days including the 2nd Monday of October
2	Early/mid-October - late December	Winter break: approximately two weeks
3	Early January - late March	Spring break: approximately one to two weeks and separates one school year from another

The graduation ceremony occurs in March, and the enrollment ceremony in early April. The Japanese public school year consists of approximately 200 days.

In recent years a few elementary, middle, and high schools have begun experimenting with having two semesters instead of the traditional three, extending the fall break to a week.

Semester	Quarter	Usual months covered	Breaks after the quarter
1	1	April - late July	Summer break: approximately five weeks
1	2	September - early October	Fall break: approximately one week
2	3	Early/mid-October - late December	Winter break: approximately two weeks
2	4	Early January - late March	Spring break: approximately one to two weeks and separates one school year from another

Colleges/universities run a two-semester/four-quarter system:

Semester	Quarter	Usual months covered	Breaks after the quarter
1	1	April	Golden Week holiday: April 29 - May 5
1	2	May 6 - July	Summer break: approximately two months
2	3	Early October - early/mid October	Fall break (Health & Sports Day weekend): three days, long weekend
2	4	Early/mid October - late December	Winter break: approximately two weeks - not all colleges have this one
2	4	Early January - early February	Spring break: approximately two months and separates one school year from another

=== Kenya ===
In Kenya, for K-12 education, the calendar year starts in January and ends in November. The academic year is divided into 3 terms as follows:

- Term 1: Early January – Late March
- Term 2: Early May – Late July
- Term 3: Early September – Early/Mid November

April, August and December are usually school holidays.

There is no standard academic calendar for universities as each university is free to set its own calendar.

International schools tend to follow the Northern Hemisphere academic calendar.

=== Lithuania ===
In Lithuania, elementary and high schools begin on September 1 and end in mid June.

Schools also take breaks/holidays:

- Autumn break: One week at the start of November
- Christmas break: Two weeks around Christmas and New Year
- Mid-term break: One week at the end of February. (Only in primary school and primary classes in schools for older pupils.)
- Easter break: One week around Easter.
- Summer break: From mid June to August 31

=== Malaysia ===
In Malaysian primary and secondary schools, the school year is divided into two semesters. The first semester begins in early January and ends in late May, with a one-week mid-term break in March. After the mid-year holidays, which lasts for two weeks, the second semester begins in mid-June and ends in mid-November, with a one-week mid-term break in September. The school year ends with a six-week year-end holidays from mid-November to early January.

The school week varies by state, depending on the weekend of the state. For states with a Saturday-Sunday weekend, the school week is Monday to Friday. For states with a Friday-Saturday weekend (Johor, Kedah, Kelantan, and Terengganu), the school week is Sunday to Thursday; as a result, school terms begin and end a day earlier in these four states than in the rest of the country. Some schools have co-curricular activities on Saturdays.

Schools are closed on national and state public holidays. Schools are allowed to have a few special holidays without replacement for events such as school anniversary and sports day. For festivities such as Hari Raya Aidilfitri/Hari Raya Puasa, Hari Gawai, Chinese New Year and Deepavali, schools usually apply for additional holidays to allow longer breaks for students to visit relatives in their hometowns. However, every day missed exceeding the special holiday allowance would be replaced by having classes on weekends.

=== Maldives ===
In Maldivians primary and secondary schools, the school year is divided into two semesters. The first semester begins in early January and ends in early June, with a one-week mid-term break. After the mid-year holidays, which lasts for two weeks, the second semester begins in mid-June and ends in mid-November, with a one-week mid-term break.

Specifically:

Quarter	Usual months covered	Breaks after the quarter
1	Early January - mid-March	Spring break: one week
2	Late March - early June	Summer break: two weeks
3	Mid-June - mid-August	Fall break: one week
4	Late August - mid-November	Winter break: approximately 1.5 months and separates one school year from another

The school week is Sunday to Thursday, as a result, all schools terms begin and end same day all over the country.

=== Malta ===
The school year is split into three terms. It starts at the end of September and ends at the end of June the following year.

=== Mexico ===
The school year in Mexico starts in mid/late August and ends in mid-July, by law covering 200 days, usually divided into 5 terms:

Term	Usual months covered	Breaks after the term
1	Mid/late August - mid-October	(none)
2	Mid-October - late December	Winter (Christmas) break: two weeks
3	Early January - late February	(none)
4	Late February - before Easter break	Spring (Easter) break: two weeks
5	After Easter break - mid-July	Summer break: approximately 45 days and separates one school year from another

There is no fall break; however, students get to have a day off on November 20 (Revolution Day).

The calendar is designed by the Secretary of Public Education (Spanish: Secretaría de Educación Pública, SEP), the government department overseeing public education aln in Mexico with arrangements of the leaders of the National Educational Workers Union (Spanish: Sindicato Nacional de Trabajadores de la Educación, SNTE). All public and private elementary schools under the guidance of the dependence observe this year.

In the case of universities, normally the school year starts in the last week of July and is divided in trimesters or semesters. Christmas Break is usually 3 weeks.

=== Nepal ===
Education in Nepal is structured as school education and higher education. School education includes primary level of grades 1–5, lower secondary and secondary levels of grades 6–8 and 9–10 respectively. Pre-primary level of education is available in some areas. Six years old is the prescribed age for admission into grade one. A national level examination is conducted at the end of grade 10, called Secondary Education Examination. Schools use the Bikram Sambat calendar for academic purposes, i.e. one BS year equals one academic term. The classes start in mid April and finishes late March. Summer and winter breaks are usually of one week to two weeks. A one-month festival vacation is provided during Dashain and Tihar, which usually fall on October and/or November every year.

Grades 11 and 12 are considered as higher secondary level. Higher Secondary Education Board (HSEB) supervises higher secondary schools which are mostly under private management. Previously these grades were under the university system and were run as proficiency certificate level. Although some universities still offer these programs, the policy now is to integrate these grades into the school system. These classes start from late July and ends in April.

Higher education consists of bachelor, masters, and PhD levels. Depending upon the stream and subject, bachelors level may be of three to five years' duration. The duration of masters level is generally two years. Some universities offer programs like M Phil and post-graduate diplomas.

Vocational education in Nepal starts after lower secondary education. Students can choose to follow a two-year curriculum leading to the "Technical School leaving Certificate". Universities also offers professional and technical degrees. Out of the formal track, short-term programs(1 year) focusing on skills development are also available.

=== New Zealand ===
The New Zealand school year runs from the beginning of February to mid-December, and since 1996, has been divided into four terms. By law, all state and state-integrated schools are required to be open for instruction for 380 half-days in a year (390 half-days for schools with only Year 8 students or below), meaning that the start and end of the school year is not nationally fixed to a particular date, as schools take different teacher-only days and provincial anniversary days off during the year. Schools can be exempted from opening the required number of half-days in some cases, such as in Christchurch in 2011 when many schools closed for up to a month after the 2011 Christchurch earthquake. The breaks between terms have fixed start and end dates, and the break length is fixed at two weeks.

In general, terms run as follows if Easter falls in early-to-mid-April:

- Term 1: Begins no earlier than Auckland Anniversary Day (Monday closest to 29 January) and no later than 7 February; ends Maundy Thursday (day before Good Friday)
- Term 2: Begins second Monday following Easter Monday; ends beginning of July
- Term 3: Begins mid-July; ends mid-to-late September
- Term 4: Begins early-to-mid October; ends no later than 20 December

If Easter falls in March or late in April, Term 1 usually ends in mid-April and Term 2 begins at the beginning of May. If Easter is in March, a 5-day half-term break then exists, with school ending on Maundy Thursday and resuming on the Wednesday. The start of term two may be delayed if Anzac Day (25 April) falls on the Monday or Tuesday directly following the Easter break.

Private schools are not required to adhere to the Ministry's term structure, but by law they may not be open for instruction on Saturday or Sunday, the ten national public holidays, the school location's relevant anniversary day, and the Tuesday immediately following Easter Monday.

Senior secondary students (Years 11, 12, and 13) in many state schools have examination leave from mid-November, on the Thursday or Friday before the first NCEA external examinations begin. Officially, however, the term still does not end until mid-December.

=== Oman ===
The school year in Oman is divided into two semesters:

- First semester starts in early September and runs to mid-January depending on the level.
- Second semester runs from early February to late May.

Usually there are exams at the end of each semester. Students get a number of breaks throughout the year: National Day on 18 November, New Higri year break, Prophet Mohammed birthday break, Eid Al-Fitr break and Eid Al-Adha break. As most of these breaks depend on the Higri year which is 10 days shorter than the Solar year, there is a gradual change on the date of these events in relation to the school year.

=== Pakistan ===
In Pakistan, the school year runs from April to March. Students have a two-month summer vacation and a two-week winter vacation. In Gilgit-Baltistan, Azad Kashmir and some areas of Balochistan, where heavy snow paralyzes life in the winter, the schools close for two months and there are two weeks of summer vacation. There is also a brief spring break at the end of the school year as well as an optional 1-day Diwali break in the fall.

Schools and universities are off on national holidays: Pakistan Day (March 23), Independence Day (August 14), Defence of Pakistan Day (September 6), the anniversaries of the birth (December 25) and death (September 11) of Quaid-e-Azam, Allama Iqbal (November 9) and the birth (July 30) and death (July 8) of Madar-e-Millat.

Labour Day (also known as May Day) is also observed in Pakistan on May 1. Both Eid festivals are also public holidays.

In the University of Engineering and Technology Lahore, the holidays are for two and half months during summer.

For the government universities, the students of bachelors are given 1–1.5 month of summer vacation and 1–1.5 weeks of winter vacations.

=== Philippines ===
==== Basic education ====
The Philippine school year lasts usually between nine and ten months long, and a school year must be at least 200 days as prescribed by law, including examination periods.

In most primary and secondary (Junior High) schools, an academic year is usually divided into quarters for purposes of examination and reporting of marks though a few private schools adopt a trimestral system. Each quarter normally lasts for approximately seven (usually the 3rd quarter) to ten weeks (usually the 1st, 2nd and 4th quarters) but the actual length of each quarter and the months they cover varies among private schools. The fourth quarter for pupils in Grade 6 and students in Grade 10 is usually two to three weeks shorter than undergraduates to allow for preparation of final grades to determine who are eligible for graduation as well as to prepare for the graduation (or some schools would call as "completion") ceremonies themselves. Each quarter culminates in most schools with a quarterly examination period of three to five days.

Prior to the COVID-19 pandemic, the school year began in public schools in the first week of June and ended between the third week of March and the first week of April. However, private schools had a slightly shorter academic calendar either starting in the second (or third week) of June or ending earlier in March. Until that year the usual national school year was as follows:

Quarter	Usual months covered (including exam periods)	Breaks after the exam
1	June – mid-August	National Heroes' Day weekend: three days (long weekend)
2	mid-August – late-October	Fall (Semestral) break: approximately one week
3	November – mid-late December	Winter (Christmas) break: approximately two weeks
4	early-January – mid-late March or early April	Summer break: approximately eight to nine weeks and separates one school year from another

There was no spring break.

For SY 2020–2021 up to SY 2023–2024, given the ongoing COVID-19 pandemic, the calendar in basic education schools shifted to a more Western styled calendar to match that of most colleges and universities thus the school year in these schools is organized as follows:

Quarter	Usual months covered (including exam periods)	Breaks after the exam
1	September - late October	Fall break: approximately one week
2	November - 3rd week of December	Winter (Semestral/Christmas) break: approximately two weeks
3	January – mid-late March or early-mid April	Spring (Easter) break: approximately one to two weeks
4	After Easter Sunday or Divine Mercy Sunday to early-mid June	Summer break: approximately eight to nine weeks and separates one school year from another

When using the 2021 calendar system, the private schools' year begins in the second or third week of September and ends in late May or first/second week of June before June 12, Independence Day.

The academic term for senior high school students (Grades 11 and 12) operates on a semestral basis. Semestral, Christmas, and summer breaks are scheduled at about the same time as primary and junior high school. Grade 12 pupils have a shorter second semester than grade 11 in order for the school to prepare for graduation.

Until SY 2019–2020, summer break usually lasted for two months, starting from the first or second week of April up to early June. Most schools tended to end the school year before Holy Week. Semestral break is normally set to coincide with All Saints' and All Souls' Day. The Christmas Break usually begins in the third week of December, and classes resume the Monday or week after New Year's Day (unless that Monday is January 2). Commencement ceremonies were often held in late March or early April. Beginning from SY 2020–2021, the summer break now falls after early to mid-June, ending in late August, which the Holy Week or Easter break replacing the former summer vacation with the switch of the calendar. The other vacation breaks remain as is.

Until 2020, the exceptions to this general schedule are international schools operating in the country, which normally follow their home country's respective school system, since then the calendar used by these schools now closely match 2021-22 general national calendar.

A period of transition for the public primary and secondary schools back to the old calendar system began in 2024, with private institutions either following the transition period of the former or maintaining the Western calendar.

==== Higher education ====
For most universities and colleges, an academic year is divided into two semesters, each up to 18 weeks long except for senior students in their final semester where they end the semester two weeks earlier. Enrollment/registration in an institution is usually good for only one semester, i.e. a student who successfully registers for the first semester is not automatically enrolled to study in the second semester. The student will need to successfully complete clearance requirements and in a few cases, maintain a certain overall mark in order to progress with her university studies in the next semester. The first semester is followed by a break consisting of two to four weeks before the second semester.

This break usually coincides with the Christmas holidays for institutions that transitioned to an August-to-May academic calendar. Otherwise, the break usually occurs from the second or third week of October to the second week of November for institutions operating under the old June-to-March academic calendar. The Semestral Break can be two to three weeks long, and normally includes the All Saints' and All Souls' holidays.

Other schools such as Technological University of the Philippines in Taguig, De La Salle University, the MBA program of the Pamantasan ng Lungsod ng Maynila, University of the Philippines Diliman, Far Eastern University – East Asia College, and AMA Computer University operate under a trimestral system. For a declining number of these schools the collegiate year starts in the fourth week of May and ends in the third week of April, while most schools use a modified form of the Western system of the major universities to suit trimestral studies. Under this system, students are typically able to finish their academic studies a year earlier than those from other universities with a semestral programme. Mapúa University began using the quarterly system with eleven weeks to a term after its acquisition by the Yuchengco Group. This allows their engineering programmes to be completed a year ahead of schools running on a semestral schedule.

Moreover, starting academic year 2014–2015, constituent campuses in the University of the Philippines System started their school year in August to end in May and the University of Santo Tomas started the Academic Year in August and it will end in May 2015. In AY 2015–2016, several Philippine colleges and universities followed the lead of the two universities.

In AY 2015–2016, San Beda University and St. Scholastica's College Manila started their calendar in early July 2015 and ended in mid- to late April 2016. The institution hoped that this move would transition it to a full August-to-May Calendar in the succeeding academic years.

Also in AY 2015–2016, the University of Santo Tomas, completed its shift to an August-to-May calendar. Ateneo de Manila University also shifted to an August-to-May Calendar this AY 2015–2016 with having a summer term in June to July before AY 2015-2016 starts. De La Salle University and De La Salle – College of St. Benilde started having an August-to-August calendar for the AY 2015–2016.

=== Poland ===
In Poland, the school year begins on September 1 and ends on the first Friday after June 18. There is a Christmas break in December which lasts until after New Year's Day. There is also a 2nd winter holiday break lasting two weeks in January or February but the exact date is different for each voivodeship and the dates usually change each year. The 2nd winter break is also the dividing line between the two semesters of the school year.

Quarter	Usual months covered	Breaks after the quarter
1	September - November 10	Fall (Independence Day) break: November 11
2	November 12 - mid-late December	1st Winter (Christmas) break: approximately two weeks
2	January	2nd Winter (Semestral) break: approximately two weeks
3	Mid-February - before Maundy Thursday	Spring (Easter) break: Maundy Thursday to the Tuesday after Easter Monday
4	Wednesday after Easter Monday - late June	Summer break: approximately two months and separates one school year from another

Most universities start their courses on October 1 (at some institutions late September), and the first semester (commonly referred to as the "winter term") ends in January. The second term starts in February or March, (the "summer term") and ends in June. Each semester is usually 15 or 16 weeks long. After each of them there is an "examination session", when no courses are taught, which lasts up to one month. The summer break starts after the exams and lasts until the start of the next academic year. In September there is an extra examination session during which students can retake failed exams.

=== Portugal ===
The school year in Portugal runs from September to June and is divided in three Terms (Períodos, in Portuguese):

- 1st Term: From mid-September until mid/late December.
- 2nd Term: From the beginning of January until Easter (March–April).
- 3rd Term: From the week after Easter (April) until mid/late June (except for 9th, 11th and 12th grades, which finish early due to exams).

During the school year there are several breaks or holidays (interrupções or férias, in Portuguese):

Term	Usual months covered (including exam periods)	Breaks after the term
1	Mid-September - October 31	Fall (All Saints' Day) break: November 1
1	November 2 - mid/late December	1st Winter (Christmas) break: approximately two weeks
2	January - late February	2nd Winter (Carnival) break: 3 days
2	Early March – late March or early/mid April	Spring (Easter) break: approximately two weeks
3	After Easter break to mid/late June	Summer break: approximately 11–13 weeks and separates one school year from another

Universities and colleges follow a different academic year, which consists of two semesters.

=== Romania ===
The school year in Romania is divided into five periods called modules, each followed by a holiday:

- Module 1, early September to late October.
- Fall holiday, late October to early November (one week).
- Module 2, early November to mid December.
- Winter holiday, mid December to early January (two weeks).
- Module 3, early January to February.
- Another winter holiday (ski holiday), one week sometime in February; depends on county.
- Module 4, February to April or May.
- Easter holiday, one to two weeks around Easter.
- Module 5, Late April or early May to mid June.
- Summer holiday, mid June to early September (around 3 months).

=== Russia ===
The school year in Russia traditionally starts on September 1 (The Knowledge Day). The school year is divided into four terms (quarters), separated by one- or two-week holidays (the first week in November, the first two weeks in January, and the last week of March). The summer holiday lasts three months: June, July, and August. Generally the school year lasts until 25 May, which is also known as The Last School-Bell day celebrated by the graduates, their families and teachers. The school graduation ceremony - Graduation Evening (Russian: выпускной вечер) - is organized on June 20–25.

The academic year at universities also starts on September 1 and usually consists of 42 educational weeks and 10 weeks of holidays. It is divided into two terms (semesters). The first one (autumn semester) runs from September 1 to January 24/25 (21 weeks, including a 3- to 5-week winter exams session at the end) followed by a two-week holiday. Coincidentally January 25 is also Tatiana Day, traditionally celebrated as Russian Students Day. The second one (spring semester) runs from February 9 to June 30 or July 4/5 (21 weeks, including a 3- to 5-week summer exams session) followed by an eight-week summer holiday. Some Russian universities do not use a traditional scheme: they exclude exams sessions, and the academic year is divided in a 2:3 ratio of 17 educational weeks (followed by a two-week holiday) and 25 educational weeks (followed by an eight-week summer holiday).

=== Singapore ===
==== Schools in Singapore ====
The school year coincides with the calendar year, and the first term begins on January 2 (unless it is a weekend or a Monday). The school year comprises four terms of 10 weeks each.

- Term 1: January to March (Term 1 holidays: one week)
- Term 2: March to May (Term 2 holidays: one month)
- Term 3: July to September (Term 3 holidays: one week)
- Term 4: September to November or late October (Term 4 holidays: seven weeks)

Terms 1 and 2 are known as Semester 1, and terms 3 and 4 as Semester 2. The first year of Junior College begins in February to accommodate the release of the O level results.

International schools in Singapore operate on a different system, often similar to the system in their home countries.

==== Institute of Technical Education ====
The training year in Institute of Technical Education is made up of two terms, commencing January and April respectively, depending on the month of intake.

===== For January intake =====
- Term 1: January to June (with a 2-week break period in March)
- Term 2: July to December (with a 2-week break period in September)

At the end of each term, there will be a 4-week break period before a new term begins.

===== For April intake =====
- Term 1: April to September (with a 4-week break period in June)
- Term 2: October to March (with a 4-week break period in December)

At the end of each term, there will be a 2-week break period before a new term begins.

==== Polytechnics in Singapore ====
Polytechnics and universities operate on a different calendar from schools. There are two semesters in a year in polytechnics.

- Semester 1: April to August (with a 2-week break period in June)
- Semester 2: October to February (with a break period around Christmas)

At the end of each semester, there will be a 7-week break period before a new semester begins.

==== Universities in Singapore ====
It is to match the northern hemisphere calendar more closely.

- Semester 1: August to December
- Semester 2: January to May

=== Slovakia ===
The school year for elementary, grammar and high schools begins on September 2 (September 1 is Constitution Day) and ends June 29 of the following year. The school day starts at 8:00 a.m. and ends at 2:00 p.m. (time varies due to day and type of school). in most schools. It is split into two halves, with the first half ending on the last day of January.

Universities starts in second half of September or 1 October. Academic year consist of 2 semesters (winter /until December/ and summer /until May/).

=== Slovenia ===
The school year in Slovenia for elementary and grammar schools begins on 1 September and formally ends on 31 August, although classes and exams are finished by 25 June. July and August thus constitute summer holidays. There are also four one-week breaks during the school year, occurring around All Saints Day, between Christmas and New Year, at the end of February, and around the May Day.

Universities and colleges follow a different academic year. It consists of two semesters—the winter semester starting on 1 October, which ends around 15 January. It is followed by a one-month break, during which students take the exams for subjects they have read in the semester. The summer semester begins on 15 February and lasts until 31 May, followed by the exam period, which ends on 30 June. Students who have not passed the necessary exams have a chance to do so during the autumn exam period in September. Students and faculty are free during July and August. New classes are held again in October.

=== South Africa ===
All South African public schools have a four-term school year as determined by the national Department of Education. Each term is between 10 and 11 weeks long. The terms are roughly structured as follows:

First Term

- Begins mid-January and ends before Good Friday (Usually in March or April).
- Followed by the Easter (Fall) Holidays, which usually last 10 days.

Second Term

- Begins mid-April and ends June
- Followed by the Winter Holidays, which usually last 21 days.

Third Term

- Begins mid-July and ends September
- Followed by the September Holidays, also sometimes called the Spring Holidays, which usually last 10 days.
- Usually Matriculants (12th Graders) start they preliminary exams (usual between August or September)

Fourth Term

- Begins early October and ends early December
- Followed by the Christmas Holidays, also sometimes called the December or Summer Holidays, which usually last approximately 40 days.
- Matriculants (12th graders) usually don't attend school much during this term due to them focusing on the year-end exams.

The academic year is approximately 200 school days in duration and runs from January to December.

Private schools follow a similar calendar, but slightly alter it according to their academic and religious needs. Some independent(private) schools have a three-term year instead.

The dates of the school year for coastal schools are slightly different from those for inland schools.

The Department of Basic Education proposed a five-week-long school break in June–July 2010 for the -hosted in South Africa-to avoid pupil and teacher absenteeism and a chaotic transport system.

South African universities have a year consisting of two semesters, with the first semester running from early February to early June, and the second semester from late July to late November. Each semester consists of twelve or thirteen teaching weeks, interrupted by a one-week short vacation, and followed by three or four weeks of examinations. In the first semester the short vacation often falls around the Easter weekend, while in the second semester it occurs in early September.

South African schools and universities are all closed on all South African public holidays. In terms of Public Holidays Act if the holiday fall on a Sunday then the schools are closed the next Monday.

=== South Korea ===
==== Basic Education in South Korea ====
In Korea, the school year starts at the beginning of March. Until 2015, schools followed a three-term system with a break at the end of each term plus a brief fall break interrupting the 2nd, similar to Japan:

Trimester	Usual months covered	Breaks after the trimester
1	March - mid/late July	Summer break: approximately one month
2	Mid/late August - before Chuseok holiday	Chuseok/Fall break: 3–5 days
2	After Chuseok - late December	Winter break: approximately one month
3	Two weeks in February	Spring break: approximately two weeks and separates one school year from another

From 2015 onwards, the calendar was changed to a more quasi-Western styled one with two semesters (although some schools retain the trimester model), having the year to end in early January rather than in February. The 1st and 2nd quarters become the 1st semester, while the 3rd and 4th become the 2nd.

Semester	Quarter	Usual months covered	Breaks after the quarter
1	1	March - early May	Spring break: approximately one week
1	2	Early/mid May - mid/late July	Summer break: approximately one month
2	3	Mid/late August - before Chuseok break	Chuseok/Fall break: approximately one week
2	4	After Chuseok break - early January	Winter break: approximately two months and separates one school year from another

School hours are approximately from 8:00 am to 4:00 pm for high school, each class lasting 50 minutes. For middle (junior high) school, the school day is from about 8:00 am–3:30 pm, each class lasting 45 minutes. In primary (elementary) school, the lower grades (grades 1–3) have classes around 8:30 to 2:00 and the upper grades (grades 4–6) have classes from about 9:00 to 3:00. Each class lasts about 40 minutes. In high school, the older students are sometimes required to stay until 9:00 pm or later studying on their own. For the most part, teachers rotate and the students stay in their classroom except for certain classes such as Physical Education, Music and Science labs.

There is a popular saying in Korean, 노는 토요일 (no-neun to-yo-il), meaning "resting on Saturdays". From 2006 to 2011, Korean students (from elementary to secondary schools) were required to go to school on the 1st, 3rd, and 5th Saturdays of each month. Prior to 2006, students had to go to school six days a week, except for 2005, when students had one Saturday off every month. The schools normally ended at noon on Saturday, and the curriculum was mostly focused on extracurricular activities. However, the Korean Ministry of Education abolished school days on Saturdays in 2012.

In 2020, due to the COVID-19 pandemic, the start of the school year was delayed to April, causing a change in the calendar:

Semester	Quarter	Usual months covered	Breaks after the quarter
1	1	April - early May	Spring break: approximately one week
1	2	Early/mid May - July 31	Summer break: approximately two weeks
2	3	Mid/late August - before Chuseok break	Chuseok/Fall break: approximately one week
2	4	After Chuseok break - early January	Winter break: approximately two months and separates one school year from another

However, the calendar was shifted back to the March–January model in 2021.

The international schools in South Korea usually start the school year in early/mid-August and end in early June.

Semester	Quarter	Usual months covered	Corresponding breaks
1	1	Early/mid August - mid-October (with a brief interruption caused by the fall break)	Chuseok/Fall break: approximately one week
1	2	Mid-October - mid-December	Winter break: approximately three weeks
2	3	Early January - late March	Spring break: approximately one week
2	4	April - early June	Summer break: approximately nine weeks and separates one school year from another

==== Higher education in South Korea ====
South Korean universities and post-secondary institutions similarly have a two-semester/four-quarter system, with the first semester beginning about March 2 and ending in mid-late June, and the second beginning at the start of September and ending in mid-late December.

Semester	Quarter	Usual months covered	Breaks after the quarter
1	1	March - May 4	Children's Day/Spring break: May 5
1	2	May 6 - mid/late June	Summer break: approximately 9–10 weeks
2	3	September 1 - before Chuseok	Chuseok/Fall break: 3–5 days
2	4	After Chuseok - mid/late December	Winter break: approximately 9–10 weeks and separates one year from another

Many universities offer optional short-term "camp" non-credit courses during semester (summer/winter) breaks, but credit courses are not common during summers and winters.

=== Taiwan ===
The school year consists of two semesters, starting in September and February. Each semester spans 20 weeks for basic education and either 16 or 18 weeks for higher education.

==== Basic Education ====
The fall semester typically begins in late August or early September and continues until late January or early February. Winter vacation usually spans two to four weeks around the Lunar New Year. The spring semester starts after winter vacation in mid-February and concludes in late June or early July. Summer vacation is observed from early July to late August. Academic terms may vary among privatized institutions in Taiwan.

Semester	Quarter	Usual months covered	Breaks after the quarter
1	1	September - October 9	Fall break (National Day): October 10
1	2	October 11 - before winter vacation	Winter break: two to four weeks around Lunar New Year
2	3	After winter vacation - April 3	Spring break (Children's Day and Qingming Festival Day): April 4-5
2	4	April 6 - June	Summer break: approximately two months and separates one school year from another

==== Higher Education ====
Semester periods in higher education are similar to those in basic education, with reduced weeks often scheduled towards the end.

==== Holiday Break ====
If any break occurs on a weekend or coincides with another break, additional break(s) will be scheduled. There used to be a policy of shifting the workday away from Monday or Friday if a holiday fell on Tuesday or Thursday, in order to create a longer holiday period.

- New Year holiday: January 1.
- Lunar New Year holiday: In January or February; lasts for one week. An additional workday may be announced to ensure the holiday spans a full week.
- Peace Memorial Day: February 28.
- Qingming Festival(Tomb Sweeping Day): April 4 or 5.
- Children's Day: April 4. If it coincides with Qingming Festival, an additional holiday will be announced.
- Labor Day: May 1. Students and teachers do not have a break on this day.
- Dragon Boat Festival (lunar): Usually around May or June. Lunar May 5.
- Mid-autumn Festival (lunar): Usually around mid-September. Lunar August 15.
- National day: October 10.

=== Thailand ===
There are two semesters in the Thai academic year with an optional summer semester. From kindergarten to high school, the first semester opens in mid May and continues until the end of September. The second semester lasts from November until the end of February (or early March). The university academic year is slightly different, lasting from mid August to late December and early January to mid May.

=== Turkey ===
The Turkish academic year begins in September and continues through to the following June. In most public educational institutions from primary to tertiary, the first semester begins in September and continues until January, and the second semester begins February and continues until June. The academic calendar and dates of mid-semester breaks may vary across private institutions.

=== Ukraine ===
The academic year at universities starts on September the 1st and usually consists of two semesters. The first semester runs from September the 1st to January the 24/25th followed by a two-week holiday. The second semester runs from February the 9th to June the 30th or July the 4/5th.

=== United Kingdom ===
==== Historical context of terms in the UK ====
The English law courts terms and legal training pupillage divided the year into four terms, partly to create a predictable work schedule, but also to make allowances for harsh travel conditions and delays caused by adverse weather at a time when all English law students and many litigants had to travel to London for training or legal advice at one of the Inns of Court. The English legal year still runs to this calendar:

Term	Start	Finish
Hilary	January	April
Easter	April	May
Trinity	June	July
Michaelmas	October	December

In Scotland, academic and judicial institutions traditionally organised their year around the Scottish term days, the traditional divisions of the Scottish legal year:

- Candlemas: 2 February, Candlemas, which fell forty days after Christmas, marked the presentation of the infant Jesus in the temple and the purification of the Virgin Mary.
- Whitsunday: originally a moveable term day, coming the seventh Sunday after Easter, was fixed in Scotland at 15 May in 1693. Whitsunday was originally the feast of Pentecost, around which a great many christenings would occur, so it became associated with the color white.
- Lammas Day: 1 August, feast of St. Peter ad Vincula was a corruption of loaf-mass, the Sunday on which the first fruits of harvest were offered, first corn ground, and first loaf made. In Scotland it was associated with hand-fasting and some fairs on this day were called handfasting fairs. (Originally synonymous with betrothal, handfasting became a contract binding a man and woman to live together for a year and a day before they decided on permanent marriage).
- Martinmas: 11 November, was known as St. Martin in Winter or St. Martin of Tours to distinguish this from another feast of St. Martin in July.

==== Primary/Secondary education in the UK ====
The school year in the United Kingdom is generally divided into three terms running from autumn to summer. For state schools, the school year consists of 195 days of which there are 190 teaching days and five INSET teacher training days. For independent schools, the school year can be as short as 175 days. The structure of the school year varies between the constituent countries of the United Kingdom with school holiday dates varying between local education authorities.

Before the mechanisation of agriculture and when more of the population lived in the rural countryside, the long summer school holiday in Britain arose in the 19th century as a result of the education authorities abandoning the battle to keep children at school through haymaking (around the start of August) and wheat harvest (around the end of August), when every available pair of hands was needed on the land.

==== England and Wales ====
In England and Wales, the school year generally runs from early September until late July of the following year. Most schools operate a three-term school year, each term divided in half by a week-long break known as "half term" (although some counties, like Oxfordshire, consider these to be six separate terms instead), and are structured as follows:

Term	Months covered	Half term break
Autumn	early September to mid-December	late October/early November
Spring	early January to shortly before Easter (late March/early April)	mid February
Summer	shortly after Easter (mid/late April) to mid/late July	late May/early June

There is no winter term.

The terms are separated by two holidays, each of approximately two weeks' duration: the Christmas holidays separating the autumn term and spring term, and the Easter holidays separating the spring term and the summer term. The period between the end of one school year and the start of the next is the summer holidays, which are six to eight weeks long.

===== Alternative arrangements for English and Welsh schools =====
The academic year originated in the pre-industrial era when all non-disabled young people were expected to work through the period of July and August. For the purposes of education, the remainder of the year was arranged into three terms accommodating the Christian holidays of Christmas and Easter. Half-term breaks divide the 16- to 17-week terms.

However the long summer break has been criticised by educationalists in the post-industrialist age because it creates a break in the academic progress. Even a House of Commons Education Select Committee recommended in 1999 that schools switch to a five-term academic year, abolishing the long summer holidays. Each term would be eight weeks long with a two-week break in between terms, and a minimum four-week summer holiday, with no half terms—the idea being that children can keep up momentum for eight weeks without a break. The proposals were introduced at a small number of schools nationally.

In 1999, the Local Government Association set up a commission to look at alternative proposals for a more balanced school year. In partnership with Local Authorities and teachers unions, they were unable to agree to a suitable alternative arrangement for terms, but by 2004 came to an agreement with the National Association of Schoolmasters Union of Women Teachers for a standardised arrangement of school terms. Since 2004, around one third of English local authorities have signed up to the proposals which see a standard academic year agreed between the authorities, including slight variations on the traditional schemes, based on the following principles:

- start the school year on a September date as near as possible to 1 September;
- equalise teaching and learning blocks (roughly 2×7 and 4×6 weeks);
- establish a two-week spring break in early April irrespective of the incidence of the Easter bank holiday. (Where the break does not coincide with the bank holiday the date should be, as far as practicable, nationally agreed and as consistent as possible across all local authorities);
- allow for the possibility of a summer holiday of at least six weeks for those schools which want this length of break.
- identify and agree annually designated periods of holiday, including the summer holiday, where head teachers are recommended not to arrange teacher days.

In addition the independent schools have set their own term dates with varying degrees of local and national co-ordination.

==== Northern Ireland ====
The school year in Northern Ireland generally runs from early September to late June or early July of the following year. Most schools operate a three-term school year similar to England and Wales; however, there is no half term during summer term due to the province's longer summer holidays. The terms are structured as follows:

- Autumn Term: September to December (half term: late October)
- Spring Term: January to the Friday before Lazarus Saturday (half term: mid-February)
- Summer Term: Second Monday after Easter to June or early July

The terms are separated by two holidays each consisting of approximately two weeks: the Christmas holidays separating the autumn and spring terms, and the Easter holidays separating the spring and summer terms. The summer holidays in Northern Ireland last nine weeks, from the start of July until the end of August, due to the Twelfth of July bank holiday.

==== Scotland ====
The school year in Scotland generally runs from middle or late August to late June or early July of the following year (usually in eastern council areas from the third Monday in August to the first Friday in July and in western council areas from the second Monday in August to the last Friday in June). Most schools operate a three-term school year, each term divided in half by a break known as 'mid-term', lasting a week or two in October, a few days to a week in February, and a few days in May. The terms are structured as follows:

- Autumn Term: August to December (mid-term: middle to late October)
- Spring Term: January to the Friday before Lazarus Saturday (mid-term: mid-February)
- Summer Term: Second Monday after Easter to June (mid-term: late May)

The terms are separated by two holidays each consisting of approximately two weeks: the Christmas Holidays separating the autumn and spring terms, and the Easter holidays separating the spring and summer terms. The period between the end of one school year and the start of the next is known as the summer holidays and consists of six or seven weeks.

==== Universities in the UK ====
Although the specific timetables and activities (e.g. teaching, revision periods, exams) contained therein vary per institution, the academic year at most UK universities runs from late-September or early-October to June or July with three or four week breaks around Christmas and Easter that divide the year into three terms. Most universities overlay a semester structure for academic courses on top of this. Many universities, particularly older ones, use terms, often with the last term given over to exams. Some universities have special names for the three terms, e.g. Michaelmas, Hilary, Trinity (Oxford) or Michaelmas, Epiphany, Easter (Durham).

Special term names (i.e. not first, second, third; autumn, spring, summer; or other obvious names) in use as of July 2023 include:

University	First/Autumn	Second/Spring	Third/Summer
Cambridge	Michaelmas	Lent	Easter
Canterbury Christ Church	Advent (trimester or semester)	Easter (trimester or semester)	Trinity (courses on trimester calendar only)
Durham	Michaelmas	Epiphany	Easter
Lancaster	Michaelmas	Lent	Summer
Oxford	Michaelmas	Hilary	Trinity
St Andrews	Martinmas semester	Candlemas semester	Summer

Exceptions to the ordinary structure of the academic year include the University of Buckingham, where undergraduate courses do not coincide with the academic year used by universities in Britain and elsewhere. Instead, they largely coincide with the calendar year—they typically start in January or February, with examinations in autumn.

=== United States ===
There are two different systems (with three different names) used in the US:

- A quarter system divides the calendar year into four terms, usually named after the seasons in which they begin or conclude. The instruction period (covering classes and examinations) in each quarter is between nine and 13 weeks. Three consecutive academic quarters counts as one academic year, as long as these comprise a minimum of 30 weeks of instruction. Academic credit earned in a quarter system is measured in quarter credit hours, with full time (for federal student aid purposes) being a minimum of 12 credit hours.
- A semester (from "six months") or trimester (from "three months") system divides the year into three periods, typically fall, spring and summer, of between 14 and 21 weeks of instruction time (although the summer period may be less than 14 weeks). Two of these periods count as one academic year, as long as these comprise a minimum of 30 weeks of instruction. Full time (for federal student aid purposes) is a minimum of 12 semester or trimester credit hours.

The above reflects federal government definitions. However, other sources define a semester system as only containing two periods (fall and spring) of 15 weeks each and a trimester system as containing three periods (fall, spring, summer) of 12 to 14 weeks each, and quarters of 10 weeks, or semesters as being 15 to 17 weeks, trimesters 10 to 12 weeks, and quarters 10 weeks each.

As an academic year comprises three quarters or two semesters, two semester credit hours = three quarter credit hours. Thus, a four-year bachelor's degree typically requires a minimum of 180 quarter hours (12 quarters) or 120 semester hours (eight semesters), requiring an average of 15 credit hours per quarter or semester to complete in four years.

==== Primary and secondary school calendars in the US ====
In the United States, the K–12 school calendar is determined by the individual states, and in some cases by the local school district, so there is considerable variation. The academic year typically consists of two 18-week semesters, each divided into two nine-week marking periods (or quarters) or three six-week marking periods, and constituting 170 to 186 instructional days (with an average of 180). An instructional week is five instructional days, measured Monday–Friday at most public and private schools although there are variations. Grades are usually reported per marking period, but major examinations are given per semester or per year.

The traditional start date for the school year has been the Tuesday after Labor Day. Although some schools still keep this tradition, many schools now start in late August or sometimes as early as late July while some other schools (especially private ones) may start as late as the mid to late September or the first week in October. The school year usually ends around late-May or as late as mid or late June).

School holidays in the United States vary by jurisdiction. They include federal, state, and local holidays, all or only some of which may be observed by an individual school district. In addition to these legal holidays, there are vacation periods of varying length, a recess of two weeks during the winter holiday period at Christmas and New Year and a one-week spring break in March or April being typical.

Sprinkled throughout the year, many schools have "in-service" days which are days off for the students and where faculty and staff receive staff development or training. Additionally, there may be days set aside for parent–teacher conferences on student progress, especially in primary school. Sometimes schools do half-day in-service days in which students are dismissed early, rather than full-day holidays.

Unplanned interruptions in schooling (such as weather events like heavy snow) can extend the school year on occasion. Such calendar extensions, as well as the initial cancellations, are decided by each local administration and announced to the parents in as timely manner as possible.

==== Community colleges in the US ====
Many, but not all, community colleges originated as extensions of the primary and secondary school system.

Some of these colleges often continue to follow the K-12 schedule. However, most operate under a semester based schedule. Washington state schools are standardized by the State Board of Community and Technical colleges and follow a quarter system.

==== Collegiate calendars in the US ====
Most American colleges and universities refer to their calendars as following either the quarter system, semester system or trimester system. The terminology used may not follow that used by the federal government; in particular "trimesters" may be used to refer to the division of the academic year into three blocks of 13 weeks or less, equivalent to the federal definition of "quarters" (e.g. Carleton College or Union College, which both have three 10-week "trimesters" in an academic year), while quarter is used when the academic year is divided into four equal-sized periods, including a summer period.

Academic terms in the US, months approximated
Month	Quarter	Trimester	Semester	4-1-4
September	summer	fall	fall	
October	fall	fall	fall	
November	fall	fall	fall	
December	fall	winter break	fall	
January	winter		winter break	short term
February	winter		winter or spring	
March	winter		winter or spring	
April	spring		winter or spring	
May	spring		winter or spring	
June	spring		summer (optional)	
July	summer	summer break	summer (optional)	
August	summer	summer break	summer (optional)	

The quarter system divides the calendar year into four quarters, three of which constitute a complete academic year. Quarters are typically 10–12 weeks long so that three quarters amount to 30–36 weeks of instruction. The trimester system is essentially the same as the quarter system, but usually with no summer period. Union College, for example, has fall, winter, and spring terms that are each eleven weeks long; there are some summer classes, but there is no official summer quarter. The three academic terms, each spanning three months, are called "trimesters", and run September to November, January to March, and April to June.

The semester system is the "traditional" division of the academic year in the US. This divides the calendar year into two semesters of 15 to 18 weeks each, plus summer sessions of varying lengths. The two semesters together constitute 32 to 36 weeks of instruction, so that three academic quarters equal two academic semesters. Thus, academic credit earned in quarter hours converts to semester hours at 2/3 of its value, while credit earned in semester hours converts to quarter hours at 3/2 of its value. Put another way, 3 quarter hours is 2 semester hours. Most universities on the semester system have a fall semester starting between mid-August and early September and ending in mid-December and a winter semester starting in mid to late January and ending in mid-May. Some colleges and universities have a 4-1-4 system, which adds a short one-month term in January between normal fall and winter semesters.

Some colleges have adopted the block schedule system. In this, academic years consist of a number of mini-terms, normally fitted into a semester system so there are four mini-terms per semester. Rather than studying four classes throughout the length of the semester, students take a single class for the entire mini-term, thus still completing four classes over the semester.

== See also ==
- Year-round school
- Academic year
- Academic analytics
- Financial year
- School holiday
