= Law term =

- For divisions of the calendar when courts are in session, see Legal year
- For legal terminology in general, see Lists of legal terms
