= Summer term =

Academic term in British schools and universities

Summer term is the summer academic term at many British schools and universities and elsewhere in the world.

In the UK, 'Summer term' runs from the Easter holiday until the end of the academic year in June or July, and so corresponds to the Easter term at Cambridge University, and Trinity term at Oxford, and some other places. 'Summer term' is defined in some UK statutory instruments, such as the Education (Assessment Regulations) (Foundation to Key Stage 3) Order (Northern Ireland) 2007, which says:

"summer term" means the period commencing immediately after the Easter holiday and ending with the school year.

The Education (National Curriculum) (Key Stage 1 Assessment Arrangements) (England) Order 2004 says more simply:

"summer term" means the final term of the school year.

Covering the possibility of six-term academic years, the School Finance (England) Regulations 2008 say

"summer term" means the third term of the school year where a school has three terms, or the fifth and sixth terms where a school has six terms

== See also ==
- Michaelmas term
- Epiphany term
- Hilary term
- Lent term
- Trinity term
- Easter term
