= School bell =

Bells rung in schools

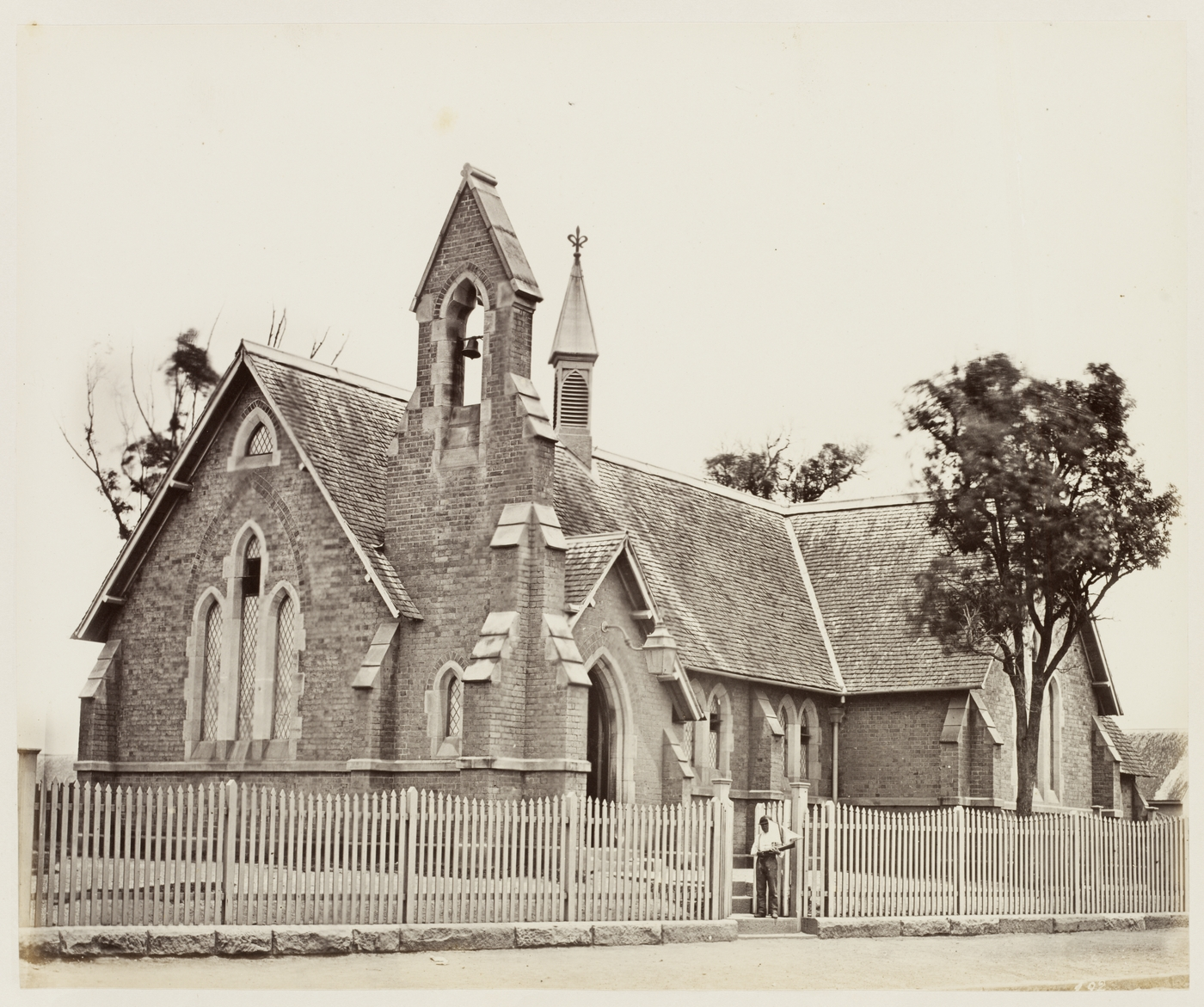
School bell visible in St Johns School, Sydney, Australia (1872)

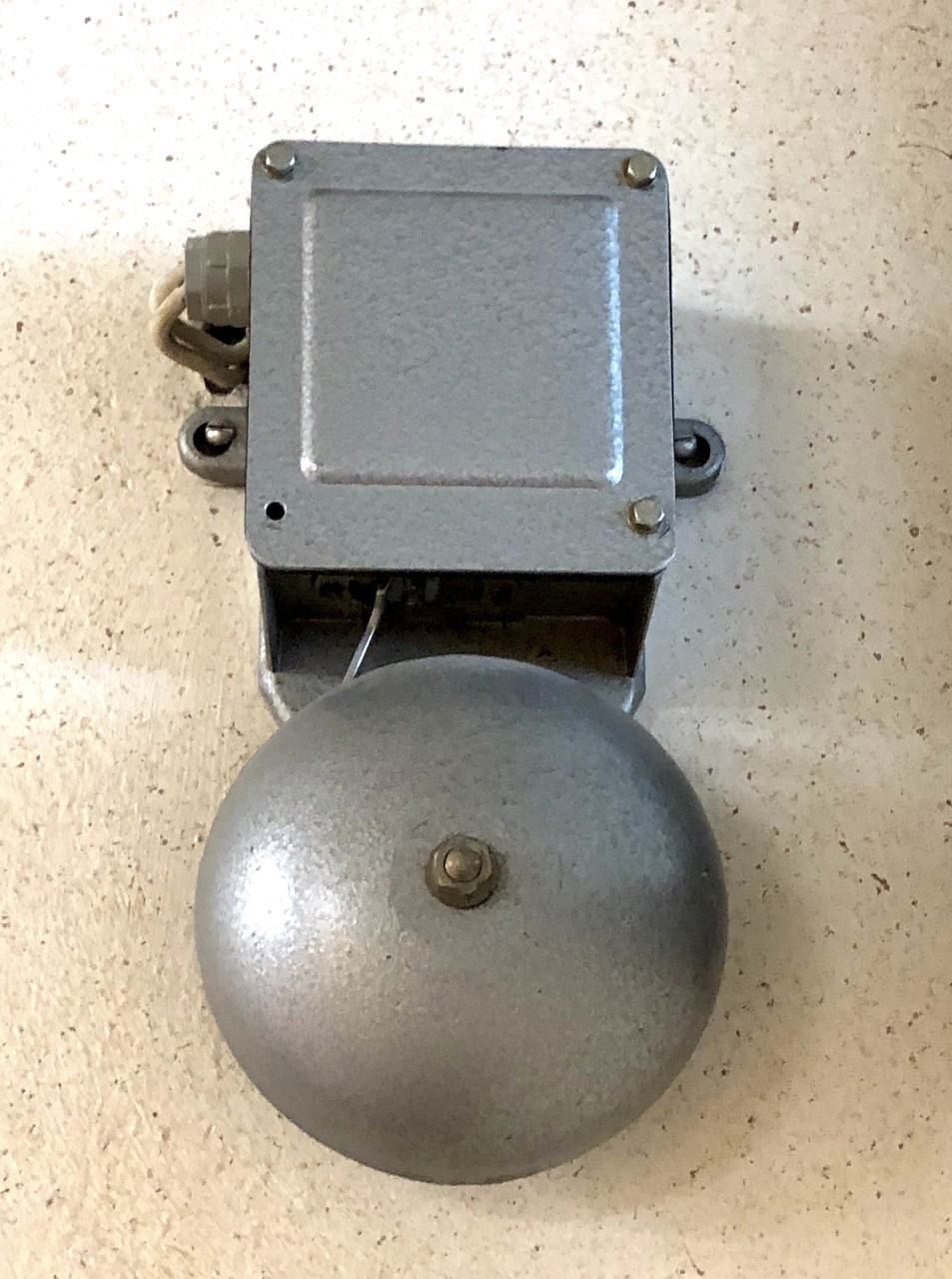
Typical school bell in Austria (1978–2021)

Sound of a School bell in Austria

The ringing of a school bell announces important times to a school's students and staff, such as marking the beginnings and ends of the school day, class periods, and breaks.

When first introduced, schools used physical bells, usually electrically operated. Since then, modern schools have increasingly used non-mechanical bells which may take the form of a tone, siren, electronic bell sound, a series of chimes, or music played over an intercom. In East Asian nations such as China, North Korea and South Korea, the Westminster Chimes pattern is commonly played as the bell, which is also used in some schools internationally.

Schools for the hearing impaired use alternative signaling methods, for example sign language from the teacher and lights that illuminate when the public address/bell is sounding.

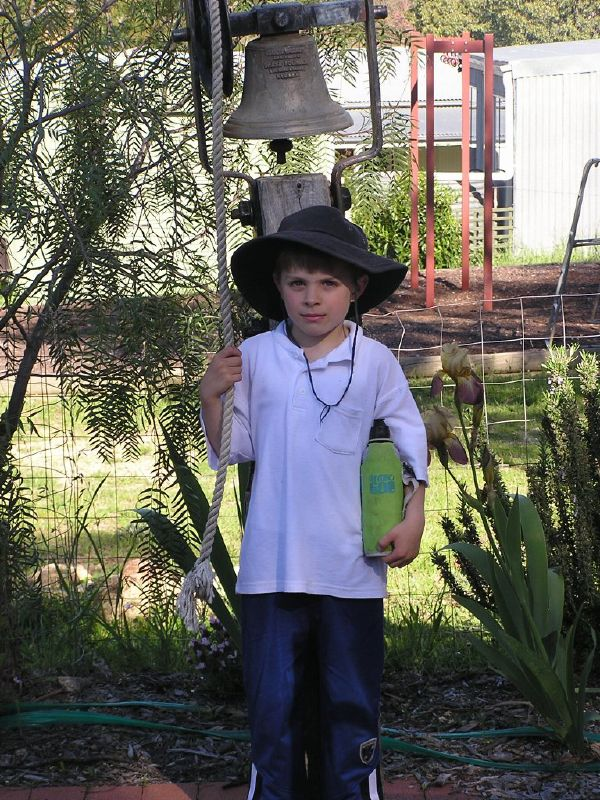
A school boy rings a traditional school bell at the Tharwa Primary School.

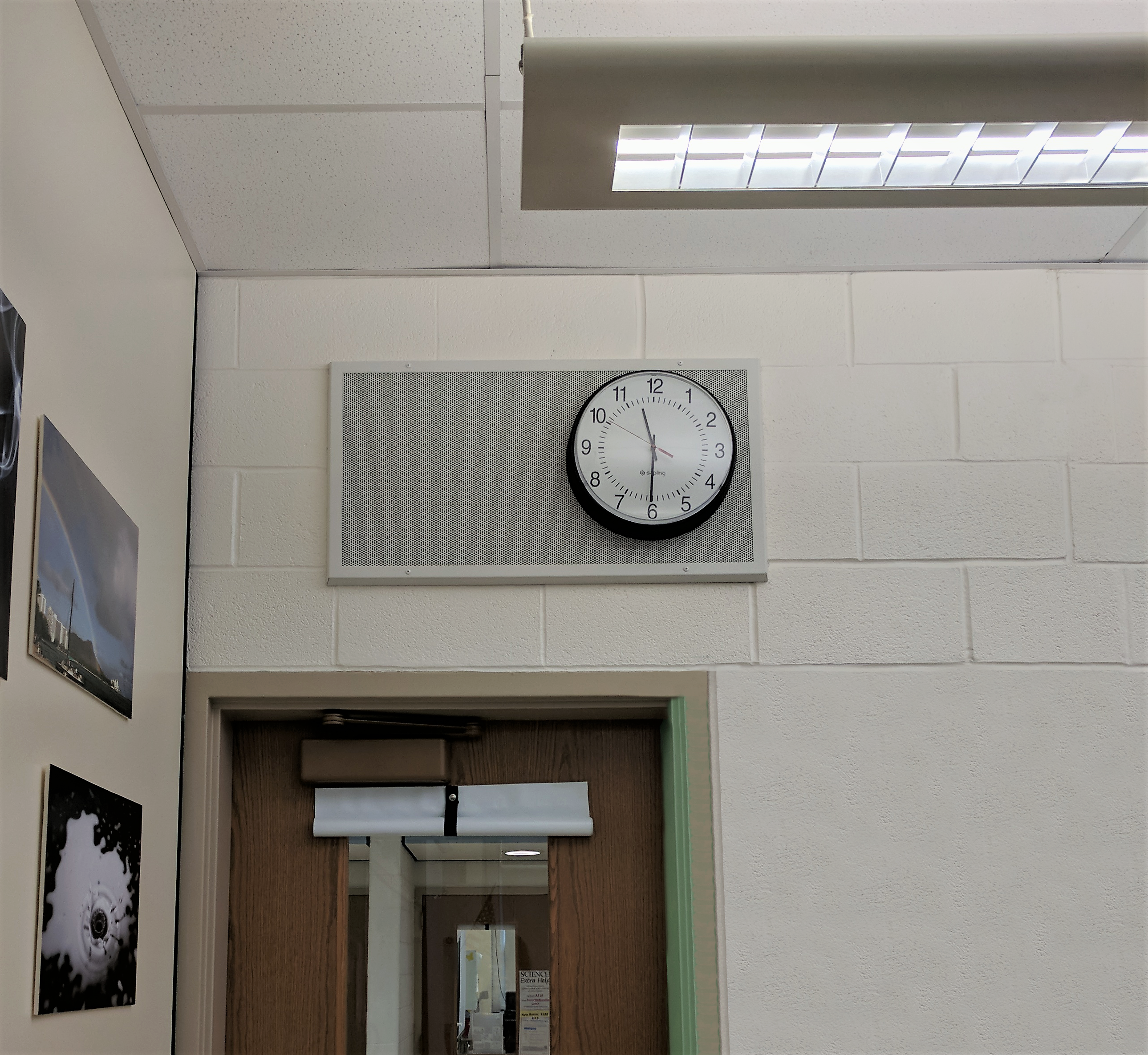
Combined intercom/clock used for the bell in a modern American high school

== Criticism ==
In October 2010, Mackie Academy in Stonehaven, Kincardineshire, Scotland, took the move to turn off their school bell system, following criticism that the school bells agitated pupils. According to the headteacher, the corridors became much quieter after the system was introduced. It was hoped that pupils would take more responsibility for ensuring they arrived on time to lessons. A number of other schools in the United Kingdom have made similar decisions either partially or completely banning the school bell system.

== Banning of school bells in Somalia ==
In April 2010, Al-Shabab–an Islamic militant group that controls large parts of Somalia–ordered school bells banned as they sounded too similar to church bells. Hand claps were then used as an alternative way of signaling that a class was beginning or ending.

== History ==
School bells were first implemented by Horace Mann in the 1830s-1840s and were used to signal the pupils. As the schools in this time were usually one-room classrooms, this was still done with normal handbells. Later, schools started using full-scale bells, similar to a Church bell. Nowadays, school bells are usually wall-mounted and electronically activated.

== See also ==
- Intercom
- Last bell
