= Michaelmas term =

Academic term

Michaelmas (/ˈmɪkəlməs/ MIK-əl-məs) term is the first academic term of the academic year in a number of English-speaking universities and schools in the northern hemisphere, especially in the United Kingdom. Michaelmas term derives its name from the Feast of St Michael and All Angels, which falls on 29 September. The term runs from September or October to Christmas.

== The legal year ==
The term is also the name of the first of four terms into which the legal year is divided by the Courts of England and Wales and the Courts of Northern Ireland.

While the name is not used in the legal systems of the United States, where most American courts operate on continuous year-round calendars without terms, the U.S. Supreme Court roughly follows the English custom by beginning its annual nine-month term on the first Monday in October, a few days after Michaelmas.

== Universities ==
Universities in the United Kingdom and the Republic of Ireland which use the name 'Michaelmas term' as of July 2018 include:

- Aberystwyth University
- University of Cambridge
- Canterbury Christ Church University
- Trinity College, Dublin, The University of Dublin
- Durham University
- Lancaster University
- University of Oxford
- Swansea University

In addition, the name is used unofficially in several other University of London colleges. It also used to be the third and final term at the University of Sydney before it swapped over to the two-semester system in 1989. It was formerly used at Heythrop College, King's College London, University of Kent, London School of Economics and University of Wales, Lampeter. The University of Exeter no longer seems to use the name officially, as it formerly did (the term dates on their website do not use it), but their Anglican Chaplaincy retains the name.

At the University of Oxford, following the resolution made by Council on 8 May 2002, Michaelmas Term begins on and includes 1 October and ends on and includes 17 December. In the Michaelmas Term, as in Hilary Term and in Trinity Term, there is a period of eight weeks known as Full Term, beginning on a Sunday, within which lectures and other instruction prescribed by statute or regulation are given. The dates on which each Full Term will begin and end in the next academic year but one are published by the Registrar in the University Gazette during each Hilary Term.

== See also ==
- Easter term
- Epiphany term
- Hilary term
- Lent term
- Summer term
- Trinity term
