= Trinity term =

Term in Ireland and the United Kingdom

Trinity term is the third and final term of the academic year at the University of Oxford, Trinity College Dublin, Canterbury Christ Church University, and some private schools in the United Kingdom. It runs from about mid-April to about the end of June and is named after Trinity Sunday, which falls eight weeks after Easter, in May or June.

At the University of Oxford, following the resolution made by Council on 8 May 2002, Trinity Term begins on and includes 20 April or the Wednesday after Easter, whichever is later, and ends on and includes 6 July. In Trinity Term, as in Michaelmas Term and Hilary Term, there is a period of eight weeks known as Full Term, beginning on a Sunday, within which lectures and other instruction prescribed by statute or regulation are given. The dates on which each Full Term will begin and end in the next academic year but one are published by the Registrar in the University Gazette during Hilary Term.

At the University of Sydney, it was the second and coldest of the three terms, running from the 24th to the 34th Mondays of the year (late May to early August) in the middle of winter, until Sydney changed over to the two semester system in 1989.

== Courts of Law ==
The Trinity term is also one of four into which the legal year is divided by the Courts of England and Wales, from 22 May to 12 June, during which the superior courts were formerly open. Trinity term is also used for the sitting of the High Court of Justice of England between 9 June and 31 July also known as Trinity sitting.

== Schools ==
Schools and universities in the United Kingdom and Ireland which use the name 'Trinity term' include:

- Barnard Castle School
- Berkhamsted School
- Brentwood School, Essex
- Brighton College
- Catholic University School
- Dean Close School
- Exeter Cathedral School
- Glenalmond College
- Hull Collegiate School
- The King's School, Grantham
- Lincoln Minster School
- Liverpool Hope University
- The London Oratory School
- Magdalen College School, Oxford
- New Hall School
- Oswestry School
- Queen Anne's School
- Royal Grammar School, Guildford
- Royal Grammar School, Worcester
- Rydal Penrhos
- Sexey's School
- Sherborne School
- Sherborne School for Girls
- St Benedict's School, Ealing
- St Columba's College, St Albans
- Trent College
- Wellingborough School
- Whitgift School

== See also ==
- Michaelmas term
- Hilary term
- Lent term
- Easter term
- Summer term
