= Lent term =

Winter term in some British universities

Lent term, named after Lent, the six-week fasting period before Easter, is the name of the winter academic term at the following British universities:

- University of Cambridge
- Canterbury Christ Church University
- University of Lancaster
- University of Liverpool
- London School of Economics and Political Science
- Swansea University

and was the name of the autumn term at the University of Sydney before it swapped over to the two semester system in 1989. It was also formerly used at King's College London, University of Kent, Exeter University, University of Wales, Lampeter, University of Wales, Aberystwyth and Heythrop College, University of London.

The term runs from January to March and thus corresponds to Hilary term at Oxford and Trinity College Dublin, and Epiphany term at Durham. At Sydney, it ran from March to May (10th to 22nd Mondays of the year).

== Schools ==
Schools in the United Kingdom which use the name 'Lent term' include:

- Abingdon School
- Amesbury School
- Barnard Castle School
- Berkhamsted School
- Birkenhead School
- Bloxham School
- Bradfield College
- Brentwood School
- Brighton College
- Bromsgrove School
- Christ's Hospital
- Clifton College
- Dean Close School
- Downside School
- Dulwich College
- Epsom College
- Eton College ("Lent Half")
- Exeter Cathedral School
- Forest School
- Gresham's School
- Highgate School
- Hull Collegiate School
- Hurstpierpoint College
- King's College, Taunton
- King's School, Canterbury
- The King's School, Chester
- King's School, Gloucester
- King's School, Rochester
- King Edward VI School, Stratford-upon-Avon
- Lancaster Royal Grammar School
- Lancing College
- Lincoln Minster School
- Liverpool College
- The London Oratory School
- Longridge Towers School
- Manchester Grammar School
- Marlborough College
- Old Buckenham Hall School
- Oswestry School
- Prior Park College
- Repton School
- Royal Grammar School, Worcester
- Ruthin School
- Sevenoaks School
- Sexey's School
- Sherborne School
- Sherborne School for Girls
- Shrewsbury School
- St Albans High School for Girls
- St Benedict's School
- St Columba's College
- St. Edmund's College (Ware)
- St Helen & St Katharine
- St Lawrence College, Ramsgate
- St Philip's School, Kensington
- Sutton Valence School
- Tonbridge School
- Trent College
- Warwick School
- Wellingborough School
- Westminster Cathedral Choir School
- Whitgift School

== See also ==
- Michaelmas term
- Epiphany term
- Hilary term
- Summer term
- Trinity term
- Easter term
