= Last bell =

Traditional ceremony in the schools of Russia and some other post-Soviet countries

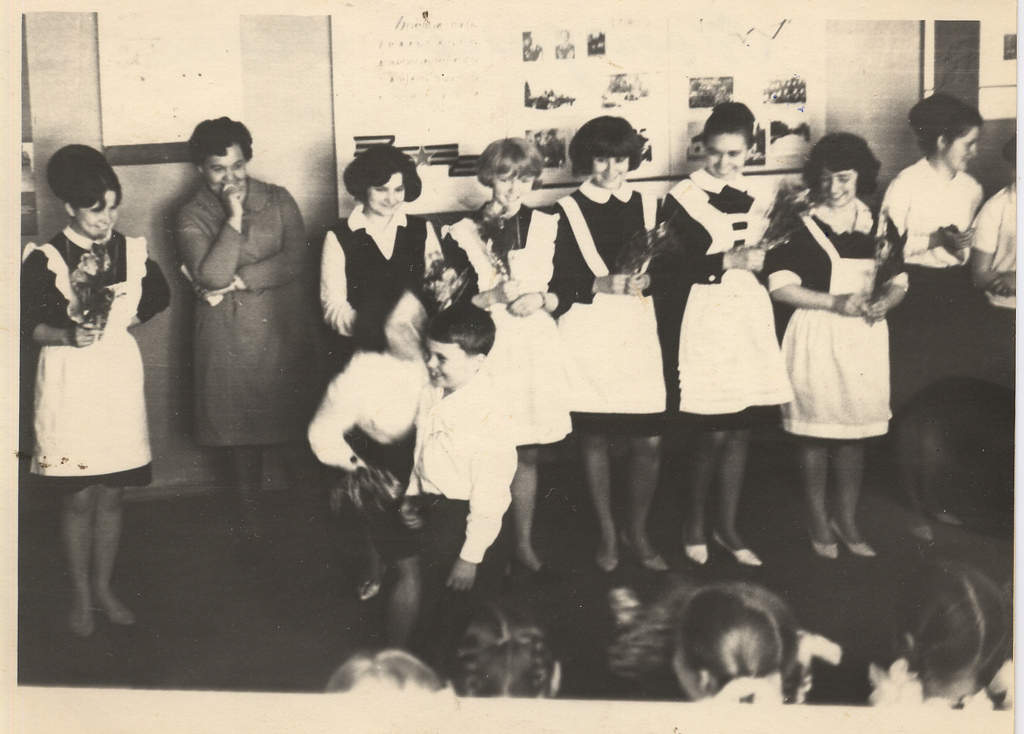
The last school bell at a Yekaterinburg school, 1968

The last bell is a traditional ceremony in the schools of some Eastern European countries (especially Ukraine, Belarus, Russia, Armenia, Lithuania). The celebration is carried out just after all the studies are finished, but before the final exams. The date usually falls on 25 May. The pupils that are about to leave the school don the classic school uniform or formal dress. A symbolic last school bell is rung, usually by a first-grader.

== See also ==
- School bell
- Knowledge day
