= Epiphany term =

Spring term at some universities

Epiphany term is the second academic term at Durham University, falling between Michaelmas term and Easter term, as in the Christian Feast of the Epiphany, held in January. The term runs from January until March, equivalent to the Spring term at many British universities, Hilary term at Trinity College Dublin and Oxford, and Lent term at Cambridge, Canterbury Christ Church, Lancaster, Liverpool, LSE and Swansea.

Historically, the name has been in use at Durham since the university's opening in 1833, and was also used at Newcastle University (formerly King's College of Durham University) until 2004. It was also used at Durham's overseas affiliated colleges: Codrington College, Barbados, and Fourah Bay College, Sierra Leone, and is used (as of July 2018) by Sierra Leone Law School.

In the United States, the name was in use in the late 19th century at Hobart College, and at Divinity School of the Protestant Episcopal Church in Pennsylvania, and for a period after 1913 at Sewanee: the University of the South. The name remained in use (interchangeably with "Spring term") as of 2017/18 at the General Theological Seminary in New York.

== See also ==
- Michaelmas term
- Hilary term (equivalent term at Dublin and Oxford)
- Lent term (equivalent term at Cambridge, Canterbury Christ Church, Lancaster, Liverpool, LSE and Swansea)
- Easter term
- Epiphany season (liturgical season in the Church of England)
