= Easter term =

Easter term is the summer term at the University of Cambridge, University of Wales, Lampeter, University of Durham, and formerly University of Newcastle upon Tyne (before 2004), in the United Kingdom. It runs from April to June.

The expression is also used for the third term of the legal year in the Courts of England and Wales, many schools and other educational institutions.

== See also ==
- Epiphany term
- Hilary term
- Lent term
- Michaelmas term
- Summer term
- Trinity term
