= Hilary term =

Second academic term in some English-speaking universities and schools

Hilary term is the second academic term of the University of Oxford, Trinity College Dublin, and some other learning institutions. The Hilary term runs from January to March and is so named because the feast day of Hilary of Poitiers, 14 January, falls near the beginning of this term. All terms are dated from this day in the following way:

- Michaelmas term – 13 Sundays before to 5 Sundays before the feast day of St Hilary (September/October–December)
- Hilary term – 1 Sunday to 9 Sundays after the feast day of St Hilary (January–March)
- Trinity term – 15 Sundays to 21 Sundays after the feast day of St Hilary (April–June)

The term originated in the legal system during medieval times. The courts of England and Wales and the Courts of Ireland divide the legal year into four terms: Hilary, Easter, Trinity and Michaelmas.

At the University of Oxford, following the resolution made by Council on 8 May 2002, Hilary Term begins on and includes 7 January and ends on and includes 25 March or the Saturday before Palm Sunday, whichever is the earlier. In Hilary Term, as in Michaelmas Term and in Trinity Term, there is a period of eight weeks known as Full Term, beginning on a Sunday, within which lectures and other instruction prescribed by statute or regulation are given. The dates on which each Full Term will begin and end in the next academic year but one are published by the Registrar in the University Gazette during Hilary Term.

"Hilary Term" can also be used to refer to one of four judicial terms in the legal year of Commonwealth countries, similarly running from January to March.

== See also ==
- Epiphany term (the equivalent of Hilary term at Durham University)
- Lent term (the equivalent of Hilary term at Cambridge, Lancaster and LSE)
- Candlemas term (the equivalent of Hilary term at St Andrews)
- Summer term
- Easter term
