= Legal year =

Calendar during which the judges sit in court

The legal year, in English law as well as in some other common law jurisdictions, is the calendar during which the judges sit in court. It is traditionally divided into periods called "terms".

== Asia ==
=== Hong Kong ===
Hong Kong's legal year is divided into three sittings, which only applies to the High Court:

- Winter: from 4 January to the Thursday before Easter Sunday;
- Spring: from the second Monday after Easter Sunday to 31 July; and
- Autumn: from 1 September to 23 December.

The beginning of the legal year in January is marked by the Ceremonial Opening of the Legal Year. The ceremony was previously known as the Opening of the Assizes, which was held until 1973 and revived in its current form in 1980. The tradition was adapted from the English Opening of the Legal Year ceremony, and today consists of an inspection by the Chief Justice of a Ceremonial Guard mounted by the Hong Kong Police Force at Edinburgh Place, followed by speeches from the Chief Justice, Secretary for Justice, the Chairman of the Bar, and the President of the Law Society at City Hall. The ceremony is attended by the entire body of judges and judicial officers, who will wear their ceremonial court dress. The procession is led by the Chief Justice, accompanied by the Chief Bailiff, who bears the ceremonial mace that symbolises the Chief Justice's authority.

=== Taiwan ===
The start of the legal year for courts in Taiwan is referred to as Judicial Day and marked in early January.

== Europe ==
=== England ===
In England, the year is divided into four terms:

- Michaelmas term - from October to December
- Hilary term - from January to April
- Easter term - from April to May
- Trinity term - from June to July.

Between terms, the courts are in vacation, and no trials or appeals are heard in the High Court, Court of Appeal and Supreme Court. The legal terms apply to the High Court, Court of Appeal and Supreme Court only, and so have no application to the Crown Court, County Court, or magistrates' courts. The longest vacation period is between July and October. The dates of the terms are determined in law by a practice direction in the Civil Procedure Rules. The Hilary term was formerly from the 11th to the 31st of January, during which superior courts of England were open.

The legal year commences at the beginning of October, with a ceremony dating back to the Middle Ages in which the judges arrive in a procession from the Temple Bar to Westminster Abbey for a religious service, followed by a reception known as the Lord Chancellor's breakfast, which is held in Westminster Hall. Although in former times the judges walked the distance from Temple to Westminster, they now mostly arrive by car. The service is held by the Dean of Westminster with the reading performed by the Lord Chancellor.

The ceremony has been held continuously since 1897, with the exception of the years 1940 to 1946 due to the Second World War, and in 2020 during the COVID-19 pandemic. In 1953 it was held in St Margaret's Church because Westminster Abbey was still decorated for the Coronation of Queen Elizabeth II.

=== Ireland ===
In Ireland, the year is divided as per the English system, with identical Michaelmas, Hilary, Easter and Trinity terms. These have a Christmas, Easter, Whit and Long Vacation between them respectively. The Michaelmas term, and legal year, is opened with a service in St. Michan's Church, Dublin attended by members of the Bar and Law Society who then adjourn to a breakfast given in the King's Inns.

=== France ===
In France, a rentrée solennelle, a ceremonial sitting of the court, is held in most courts in September to swear in new judges and in January or February, to mark the start of the legal year. New judges may also be sworn in at that event. Bar associations (barreaux), especially larger ones, may also hold a rentrée solennelle, but often at a completely different time of the year to the court-organised official ceremonies, such as in November.

French courts do not sit in a formal term structure, although the practice of vacances judiciaires (legal vacations) between July and the end of August, in late December around Christmas and New Year's and, to a lesser extent, Easter, mean that courts often do not sit to hear non-urgent business during those times, creating, de facto, three legal terms each year.

== North America ==
=== Canada ===
Courts in Canada do not have formal terms. They are open year-round but tend to be less busy over the summer months. There is a formal opening of the courts in Ontario in September.

=== United States ===
The United States Supreme Court follows part of the legal year tradition, albeit without the elaborate ceremony. Historically, the custom of the court was to hold one term per year that started in October and usually adjourned in June and July, with special terms held "whenever necessary". The court's term traditionally commences on the first Monday in October (and is thus simply called "October Term"), with a Catholic Red Mass the day before. Under the current version of Rule 3 of the Rules of the Supreme Court, the court sits in a "continuous annual term commencing on the first Monday in October and ending on the day before the first Monday in October of the following year." During this term, the court alternates between "sittings" and "recesses" and goes into final recess at the end of June.

Several Midwest and East Coast states and some federal courts still use the legal year and terms of court. Like the Supreme Court, the U.S. Court of Appeals for the Second Circuit has a single year-long term with designated sittings within that term, although the Second Circuit begins its term in August instead of October (hence the name "August Term"). The U.S. Tax Court divides the year into four season-based terms starting in January.

Connecticut appellate courts divide the legal year into eight terms starting in September. New York courts divide the year into 13 terms starting in January. The Georgia Court of Appeals uses a three-term year starting in January. The Illinois Supreme Court divides the year into six terms starting in January.

Several states, like Ohio and Mississippi, do not have a uniform statewide rule for terms of court, so the number of terms varies greatly from one court to the next because every single court sets forth its own terms of court in its local rules.

However, the majority of U.S. states and most federal courts have abandoned the legal year and the related concept of terms of court. Instead, they reverse the presumption. They merely mandate that the courts are to be open year-round during business hours on every day that is not Saturday, Sunday, or a legal holiday. A typical example is Rule 77(c)(1) of the Federal Rules of Civil Procedure, which states that "The clerk's office ... must be open during business hours every day except Saturdays, Sundays, and legal holidays." Furthermore, 28 U.S.C. § 452 states: "All courts of the United States shall be deemed always open for the purpose of filing proper papers, issuing and returning process, and making motions and orders."

== See also ==
- Law Terms Act 1830
- Fiscal year
