= Aging of Russia =

Aging population of Russia

Population pyramid of Russia from 2020 to projections up to 2100

The demographic crisis in Russia refers to the aging and decline of the Russian population caused by demographic transition and other factors. Although most developed countries and some developing countries are experiencing demographic transition, Russia stands out within this group because of its high mortality rate and relatively low life expectancy, particularly among men.

From 1992 to 2008 and again since 2020, Russia has experienced net population loss; the natural population decline having no longer been offset by a positive migration balance. The demographic decline of Russia is likely to continue in the future, with the UN projecting Russia's population to shrink from 146 million in 2022 to 135.8 million by 2050.

The median age has risen significantly as a result of the demographic crisis, increasing from 32.2 in 1990 to 40.3 in 2025. The number of senior citizens (i.e, those older than 65) has increased as well, rising from 10% in 1990 to 16.6% in 2023.

== History ==
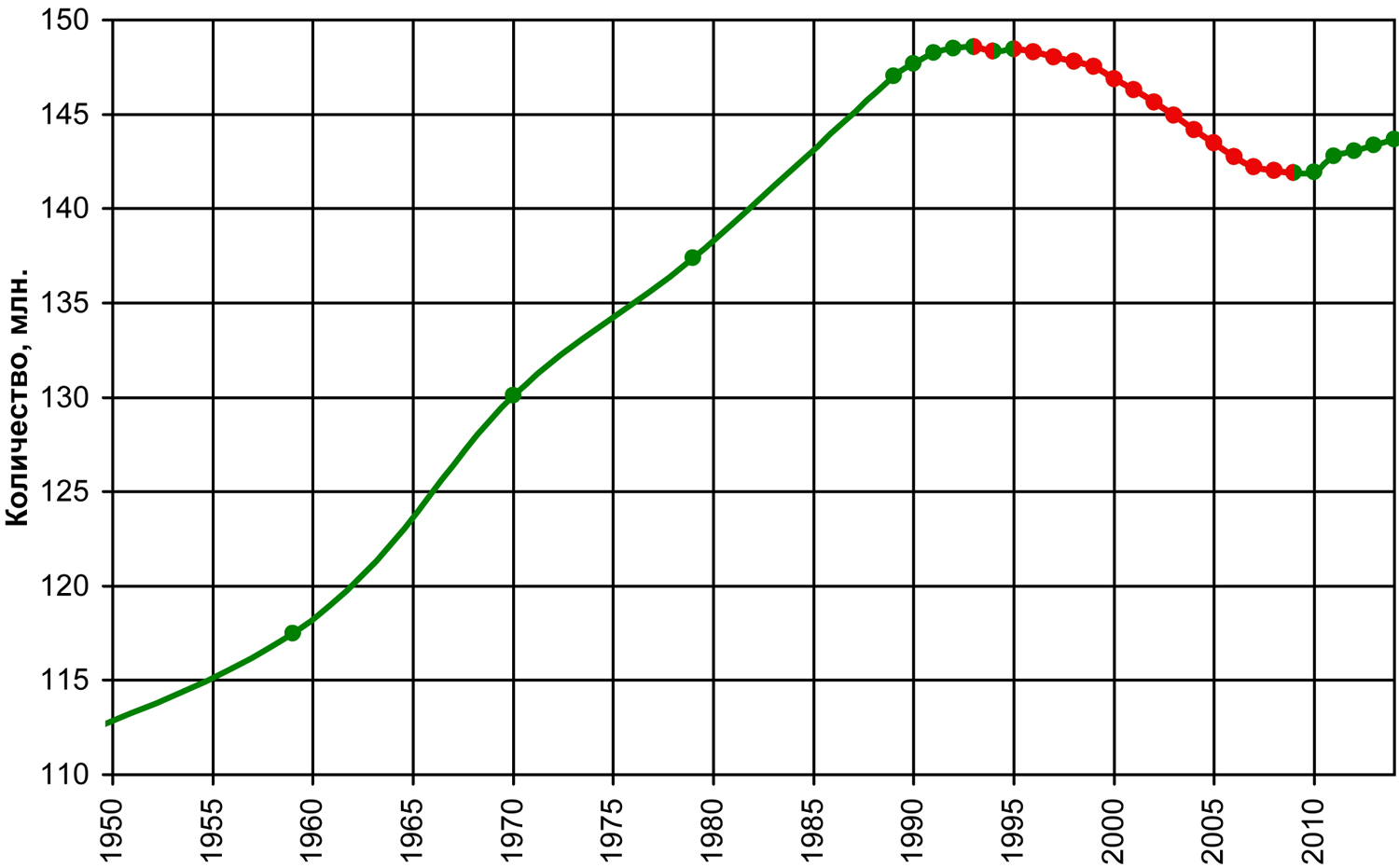
Total population of Russia 1950–2010

=== In the economic sphere ===
The demographic crisis has a positive economic effect on the second stage of the changing age structure of the population (the fraction of the average working-age generation is maximal at a relatively small proportion of younger and older) and a negative economic effect on the third stage of the changing age structure of the population (when the proportion of the older generation is maximal at a relatively small share younger and middle generation). Russia was predicted to have labor shortages by 2025.

With a reduced fertility rate, the load on the working population increases because each worker has to support more retirees.

=== Demographic aging of the population ===
Prior to First World War, the Russian Empire had the fastest growing population among world powers, only surpassed by the United States. Despite demographic losses in the interwar period from the First World War, the Civil War, and the numerous famines, between 1920 and 1940, the RSFSR of the Soviet Union grew at an average of 1.11% per year and managed to surpass 100 million people.

In the Second World War, the Eastern Front was one of the most costly theatres, accounting up to 40 million of the 70–85 million deaths attributed to World War II. The Soviet Union in particular had exceptionally heavy losses, with Russia proper losing as much as 13 million people. Because young men bore the brunt of war losses, the war left Russia with a huge lack of men compared to women. Even in 1959, men still made up less than 45% of the overall population.

The age structure of the population of Russia, 1946-2023

After the 1960s, despite a small baby boom after the war, Russia had begin to experience demographic ageing; the proportion of those 60 and older doubled between 1959 and 1990. However the population of Russia continued to remain relatively young and had a large pool of potential parents, which compensated for fertility decline and thus population growth continued; the Russian population increased by 45,760,000 people from 1951 to 1990.

Starting in the early 1990s, the age structure of the population had eventually morphed in a way that would start prompting eventual population decline not growth, and the fertility crash following the dissolution of the Soviet Union and the ensuing economic crisis only further enforced this. This was not unique to Russia, and such issues have been felt in many developed countries and increasingly in developing countries. But Russia was unique case as the Russian fertility crash coincided with increasing mortality. Relative to death rates in 1990, there were millions of excess deaths in the following decade and life expectancy among Russian men declined severely.

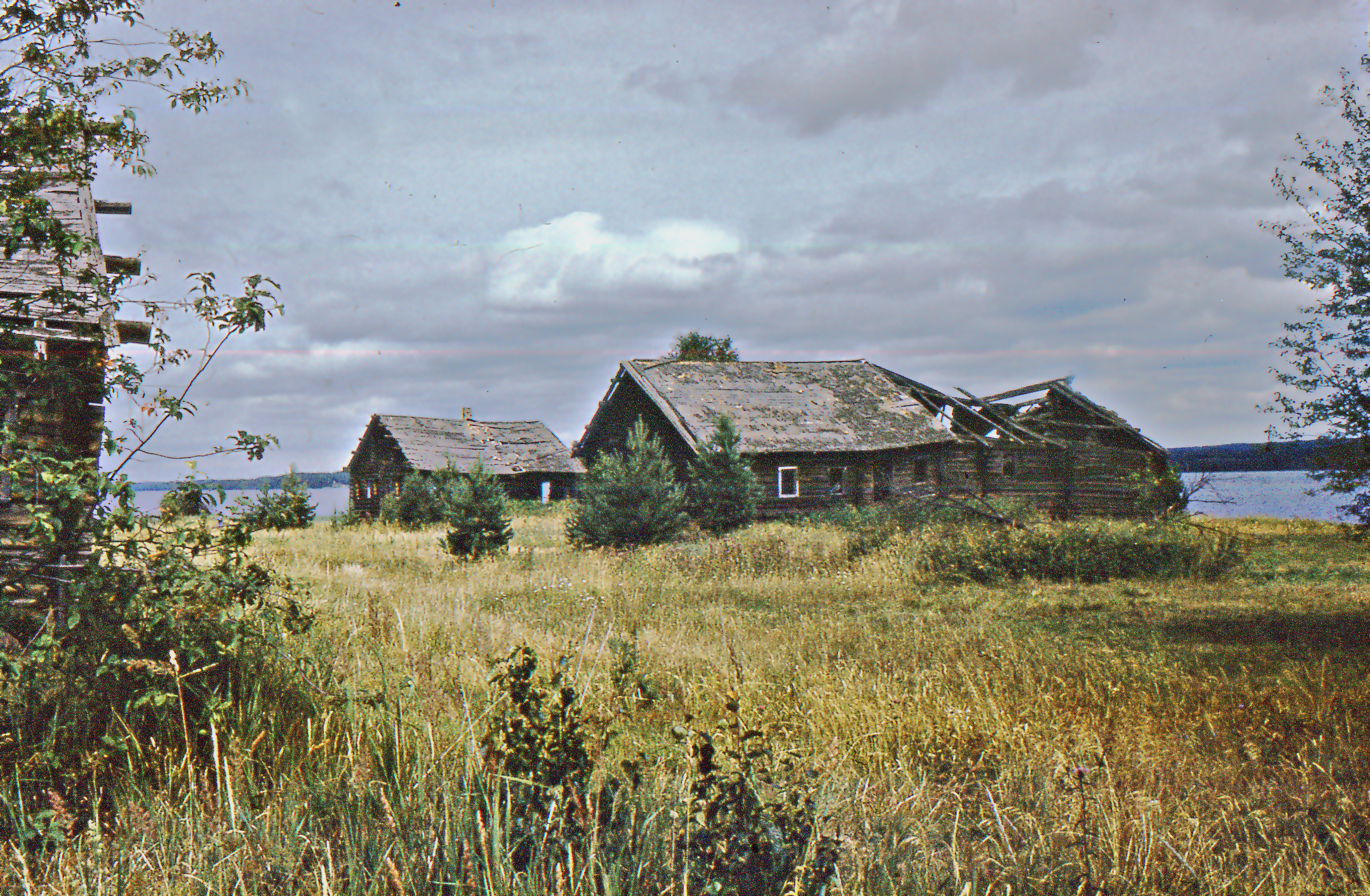
Thousands of abandoned villages are scattered across Russia.

Currently, the share of people aged 65 and older in the population of Russia is 13%. According to forecasts of the Russian Academy of Sciences from the early 2000s, in 2016 elderly people aged 60 and over would have accounted for 20% of Russians, and children up to 15 years old would only have made up 17%. However, in Russia, in contrast to other countries, aging is limited by high mortality among older people.

=== Population trends 2015–present ===
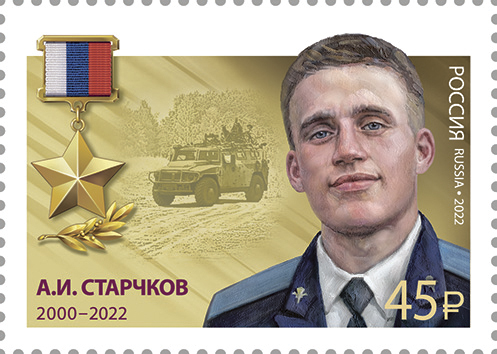
Russian soldiers killed in war in Ukraine have further exacerbated Russia's demographic crisis.

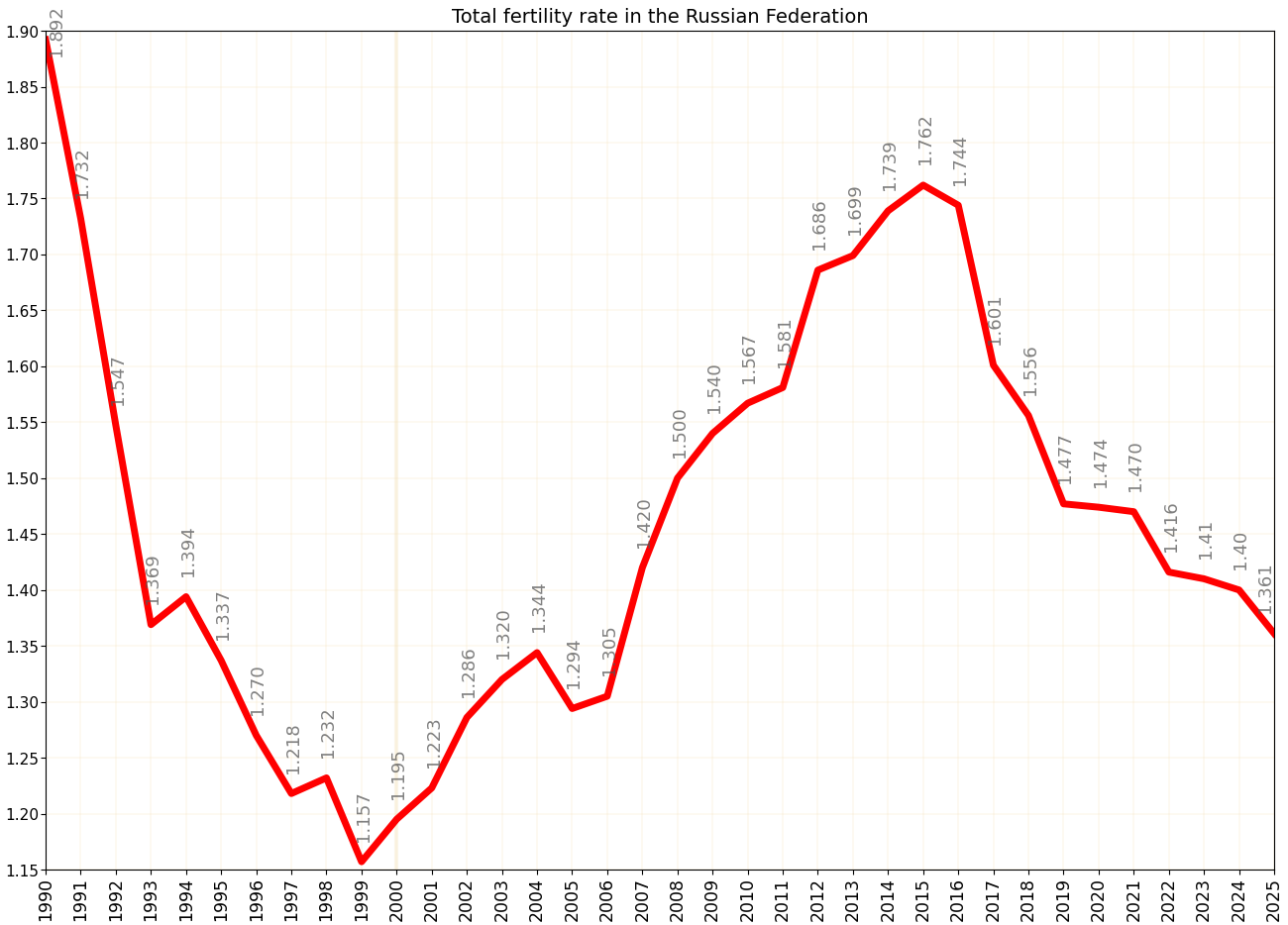
Total fertility rate in Russia, 1990—2025

In 2020, over 500,000 deaths were attributed to the COVID-19 pandemic, bringing the total deaths since its onset to approximately 700,000. Although 2021 was initially projected to have less impact on mortality, death rates still surpassed birth rates. President Vladimir Putin's plan to overturn the stagnation was announced in 2017 in response to the downward trend. However the plan only partially helped in their demographic crisis and was hindered by the Pandemic, despite showing signs of recovery.

Historical population
| Year | Pop. | ±% p.a. |
|---|---|---|
| 1897 | 67,473,000 | — |
| 1926 | 93,459,000 | +1.13% |
| 1939 | 108,377,000 | +1.15% |
| 1959 | 117,534,000 | +0.41% |
| 1970 | 130,079,000 | +0.93% |
| 1979 | 137,552,000 | +0.62% |
| 1989 | 147,386,000 | +0.69% |
| 2002 | 145,166,731 | −0.12% |
| 2010 | 142,856,836 | −0.20% |
| 2015 | 144,985,057 | +0.30% |
| 2019 | 146,764,655 | +0.31% |
| 2020 | 146,171,015 | −0.40% |
| 2021 | 146,000,460 | −0.12% |

The natural population declined by 997,000 between October 2020 and September 2021 (the difference between the number of births and the number of deaths over a period). The natural death rate in January 2020, 2021, and 2022 have each been nearly double the natural birth rate.

Following the Russian invasion of Ukraine in 2022, the demographic crisis in the country has deepened, as the country has reportedly suffered high military fatalities while facing renewed brain drain and human capital flight caused by Western mass-sanctions and boycotts. Many commentators predict that the situation will be worse than during the 1990s.

In March 2023, The Economist reported that "Over the past three years the country has lost around 2 million more people than it would ordinarily have done, as a result of war [in Ukraine], disease and exodus."

According to Russian economist Alexander Isakov, "Russia's population has been declining and the war will reduce it further. Reasons? Emigration, lower fertility and war-related casualties." Russian journalist Andrey Kolesnikov noted that "We are seeing a phenomenon Russia has faced many times: wave after wave of wars and repression that drain away human resources."

The UN is projecting that the decline that started in 2021 will continue, and if current demographic conditions persist, Russia's population would be 120 million in fifty years, a decline of about 17%.

In January 2024, the Russian statistics agency Rosstat predicted that Russia's population could drop to 130 million by 2046 in the most low-end scenario. The UN's 2024 scenarios project Russia's population to be between 74 million and 112 million in 2100, a decline of 25 to 50%.

== Reactions ==
Many Russian politicians have called for the reinstating of the childless tax in Russia that it used to have from the 1940s until the 1990s, due to declining birth rates.

In August 2022, Russia revived the Soviet-era Mother Heroine award for women with ten children.

In November 2024, Russian President Vladimir Putin signed a bill into law that bans 'Childfree Propaganda' to boost birthrates in Russia. In the same year, in a decree for national development goals, Putin set a national life expectancy target of 81 years by 2036, a revision from an earlier life expectancy goal of 78 years by 2030.

== See also ==
- Russian Cross
- Demographics of Russia
- Human capital flight
- Day of Conception
- Population decline
- Unpromising villages

== Literature ==
- Демографический ежегодник России — 2008
- Демографический ежегодник России — 2010
- Ермаков С. П., Захарова О. Д. Демографическое развитие России в первой половине XXI века. — М.: ИСПИ РАН, 2000.
- Антонов А. И., Медков В. М., Архангельский В. Н. Демографические процессы в России XXI века. — М.: «Грааль», 2002.
- Зиверт Ш., Захаров С., Клингхольц Р. Исчезающая мировая держава Берлин: Berlin Institute for Population and Development, 2011. ISBN 978-3-9812473-8-1
- Эберштадт Н. Демографический кризис в России в мирное время.
- Антонов А. И. Институциональный кризис семьи и возможности его преодоления в России (часть 1) // Демография.ру, 27.03.2011.
- Борисов В. Демографическая ситуация в современной России. Демографические исследования. 2006. No. 1.
- Залунин В. И., Калинина Т. А. Демографический кризис как социальный феномен и особенности его проявления в современной России // Труды Дальневосточного государственного технического университета, No. 132, 2002. С. 171–174.
- Левина Е. И. Институт семьи в современной демографической ситуации в России // Вестник Тамбовского университета. Серия: Гуманитарные науки, No. 12, 2008. С. 483–488.
- Луцкая Е. Е. Проблемы социально-демографического развития // Социальные и гуманитарные науки. Отечественная и зарубежная литература. Серия 2: Экономика. Реферативный журнал, No. 4, 2001. С. 104–108.
- Сулакшин С. С. Корреляционный факторный анализ российского демографического кризиса // Власть, No. 1, 2007. С. 16–28.
- Ткаченко Н. Н. Демографическая политика России в контексте национальной безопасности // Философия права, No. 3, 2009. С. 116–119.
- Николас Эберштадт. Russia's Peacetime Demographic Crisis: Dimensions, Causes, Implications
- Vladimir M. Shkolnikov, G. A. Cornia. Population crisis and rising mortality in transitional Russia. — in.: The mortality crisis in transitional economies. — Oxford: Oxford University Press, 2000: p. 253—279.
- А. Г. Вишневский, В. М. Школьников. Смертность в России. Главные группы риска и приоритеты действий. — М.: Московский Центр Карнеги, Научные доклады, Вып. 19, 1997
- Белобородов И. И. Социальные технологии формирования семейно-демографической политики в России в условиях демографического кризиса // Диссертация на соискание учёной степени кандидата социологических наук / Российский государственный социальный университет. Москва, 2008.
- Моисеев М. Демографический кризис: в чём видят выход государство и Церковь // Официальный сайт Московского Патриархата Русской Православной Церкви, 16.05.2006.
- Рязанцев С. В. Эмиграция женщин из России. Доклад на круглом столе «Семья и будущее цивилизаций» Мирового общественного форума «Диалог цивилизаций» (7—11.10.2010 г., Греция).
- Демографическая доктрина России: Проект для обсуждения (Руководитель разработки — Ю. В. Крупнов) // Институт мирового развития, Москва, 2005.
