= Demographics of Russia =

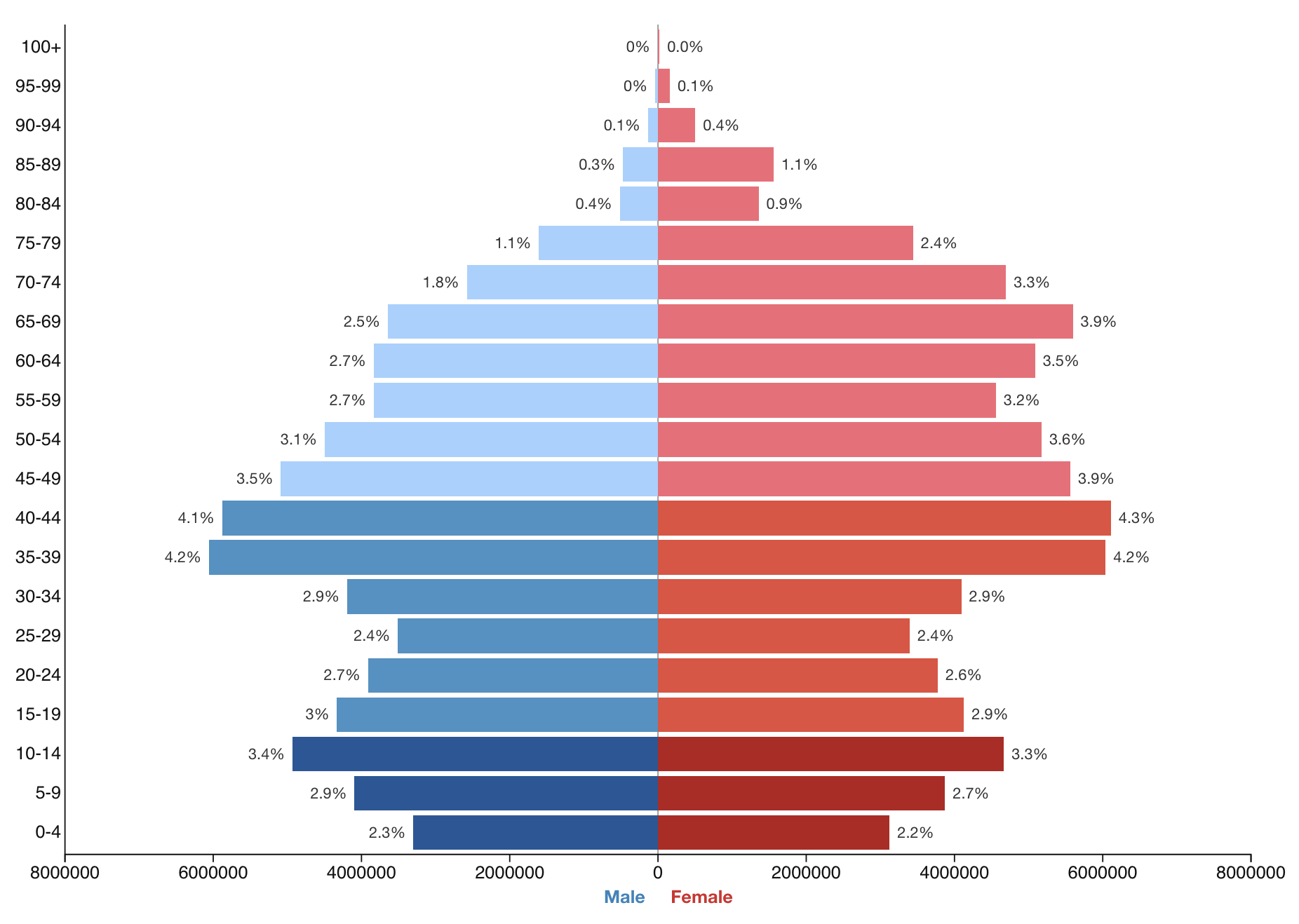
- Population pyramid of Russia as of 1 January 2026
- Population: ▼146,028,325 (January 2025)
- Growth rate: ▼ -0.38% (2022)
- Birth rate: ▼8.4 births/1,000 population (2024)
- Death rate: ▼12.5 deaths/1,000 population (2024)
- Life expectancy: ▲73 years (2023)
  - male: ▲68 years (2023)
  - female: ▲79 years (2023)
- Fertility rate: ▼1.36 (2025)
- Infant mortality: ▼4.5 deaths/1,000 live births (2020)
- Net migration rate: ▼0.9 migrant(s)/1,000 population (2020)
- Immigrant share: 5.3% (2024)

Age structure
- Under 18 years: ~23.21%
- 18–44 years: ~34.73%
- 45–64 years: 26.55%
- 65 and over: 15.6%

Sex ratio
- Total: 0.86 male(s)/female (2009)
- At birth: 1.06 male(s)/female
- Under 15: 1.06 male(s)/female (male 11,980,138/female 11,344,818)
- 15–64 years: 0.925 male(s)/female (male 48,166,470/female 52,088,967)
- 65 and over: 0.44 male(s)/female (male 5,783,983/female 13,105,896)

Nationality
- Nationality: noun: Russian(s) adjective: Russian
- Major ethnic: Russians (71.73%)
- Minor ethnic: Tatars (3.20%); Chechens (1.14%); Bashkirs (1.07%); Chuvash (0.73%); Avars (0.69%); Armenians (0.64%); Ukrainians (0.60%); Dargins (0.43%); Kazakhs (0.40%); Kumyks (0.38%); Kabardians (0.36%); Ingush (0.35%); Lezgins (0.33%); Others (6.65%); Undeclared (11.27%)

Language
- Official: Russian
- Spoken: Languages of Russia

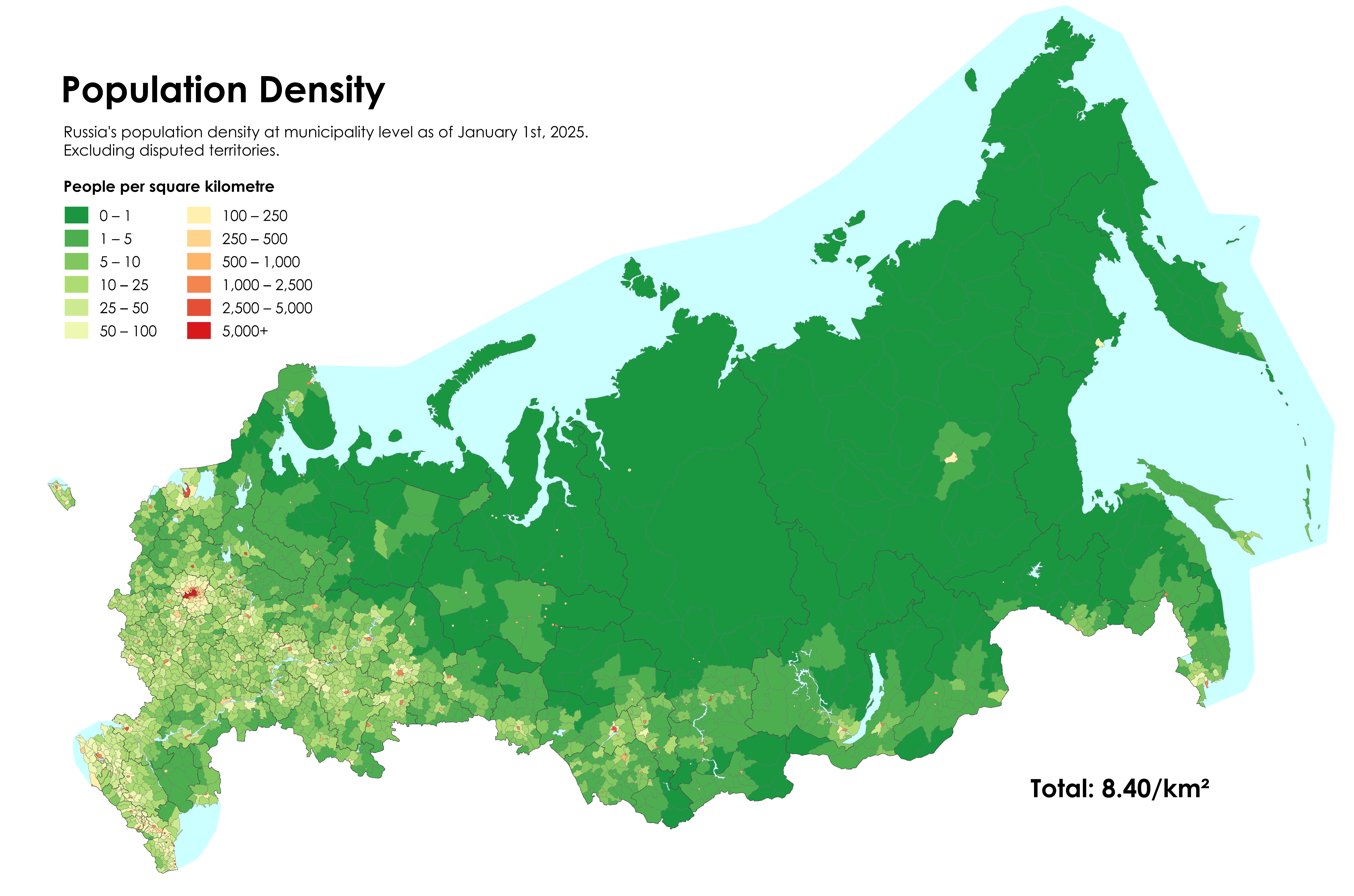
Map of Russia's population density at municipality level, based on the results of the 2021 census.

Russia has an estimated population of 146.0 million as of 1 January 2025, down from 147.2 million recorded in the 2021 census. It is the most populous country in Europe, and the ninth-most populous country in the world. Russia has a population density of 8.5 inhabitants per square kilometre (22 inhabitants/mi^{2}), with its overall life expectancy being 73 years (68 years for males and 79 years for females) as of 2023. The total fertility rate across Russia was estimated to be 1.37 children born per woman as of 2025, which is in line with the European average but below the replacement rate of 2.1.

By the end of 2024, the natural decline of the Russian population amounted to 596.2 thousand people, according to published data from Rosstat. Compared to the end of 2023, the indicator increased by 20.4% (from 495.3 thousand). However, this decline is offset by massive immigration, particularly from Central Asia.

From 1992 to 2012, and again since 2016, Russia's death rate has exceeded its birth rate, which has been called a demographic crisis by analysts. In 2009, Russia recorded annual population growth for the first time in fifteen years; during the mid-2010s, Russia had seen increased population growth due to declining death rates, increased birth rates and increased immigration. Between 2020 and 2021, Russia's population had undergone its largest peacetime decline in recorded history, due to excess deaths from the COVID-19 pandemic. The 2022 Russian invasion of Ukraine and subsequent war further deepened the crisis with increased emigration and military fatalities.

Russia is a multinational state, home to over 193 ethnic groups nationwide. In the 2021 Census, nearly 72% of the population were ethnic Russians and approximately 19% of the population were ethnic minorities. (Note: 11.27% of the total Russian population did not declare an ethnic affiliation in the census, so these figures should be treated with caution.) According to the United Nations, Russia's immigrant population is the world's third largest, numbering over 11.6 million; most of whom are from other post-Soviet states.

== Population ==
Demographic statistics according to the latest Rosstat vital statistics and the World Population Review in 2019.

- One birth every 22 seconds
- One death every 13 seconds
- Net loss of one person every 30 seconds

View source data.

=== Demographic crisis ===
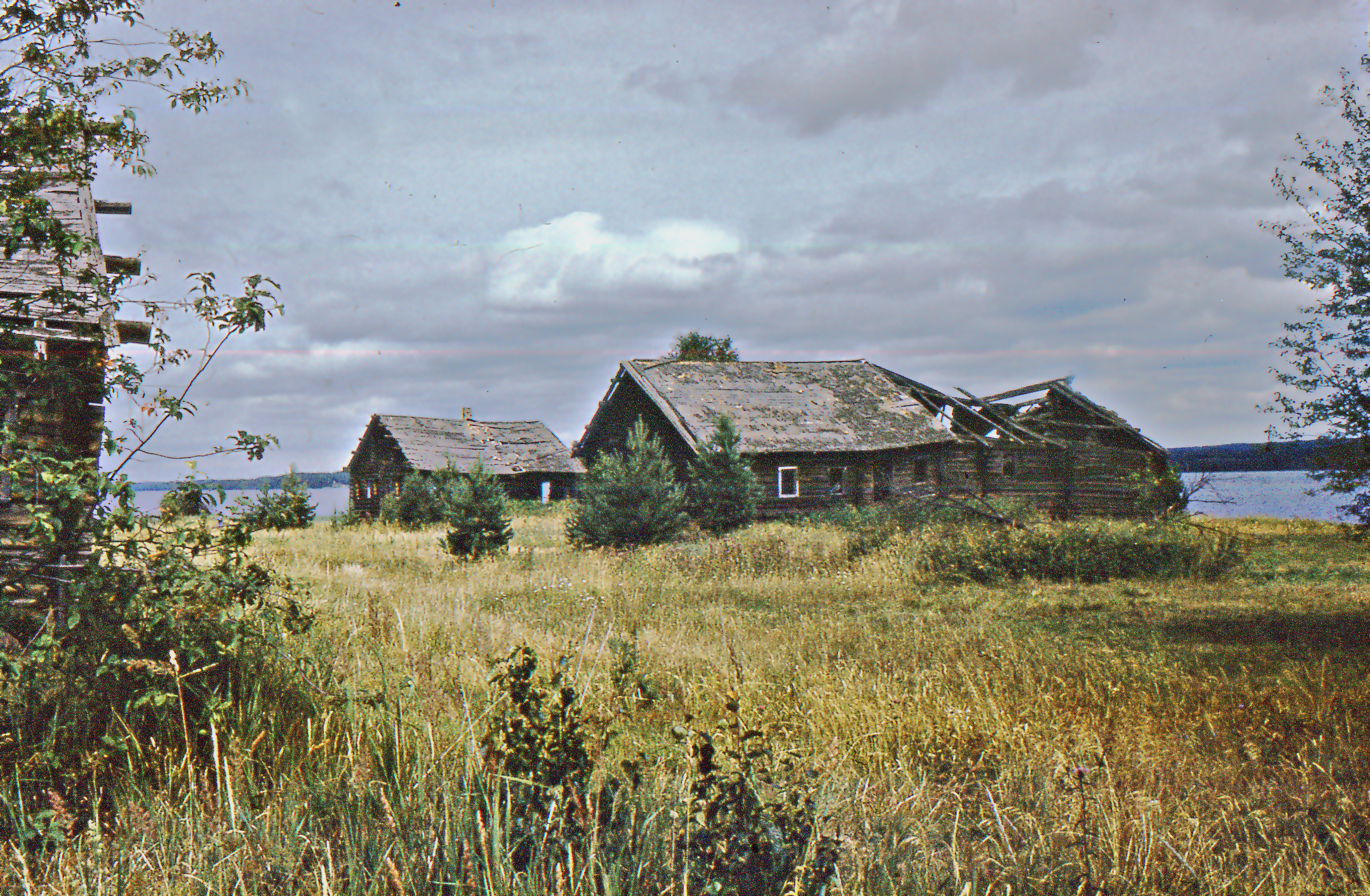
Thousands of abandoned villages are scattered across Russia.

After having peaked at 148,689,000 in 1991, the population then decreased, falling to 142,737,196 by 2008. Russia has become increasingly reliant on immigration to maintain its population; 2021 had the highest net immigration since 1994, despite which there was a small overall decline from 146.1 million to 145.4 million in 2021, the largest decline in over a decade.

The natural population had declined by 997,000 between October 2020 and September 2021 (the difference between the number of births and the number of deaths over a period). The natural death rate in January 2020, 2021, and 2022 have each been nearly double the natural birth rate.

Following the Russian invasion of Ukraine in 2022, the demographic crisis in the country has deepened, as the country has suffered high military fatalities while facing renewed human capital flight and brain drain caused by Western mass-sanctions and boycotts. The number of Russian men which died due to the Russo-Ukrainian war has been censored by the Russian 2022 war censorship laws. In 2022, tens of thousands of tech workers left Russia. In 2024, the website of the science journal Science indicated that Russia has seen a multi-year brain drain in the science profession and that salaries are decreasing in the Russian scientific community. Many commentators predict that the situation will be worse than during the 1990s. Although, a large part of the emigrants have returned home to Russia in a continuing process.

In March 2023, The Economist reported that "Over the past three years the country has lost around 2 million more people than it would ordinarily have done, as a result of war [in Ukraine], disease and exodus."

The UN is projecting that the decline that started in 2021 will continue, and if current demographic conditions persist, Russia's population will be 120 million in 50 years, a decline of about 17%. In January 2024, the Russian statistics agency Rosstat predicted that Russia's population could drop to 130 million by 2046.

=== Fertility ===
Population age pyramid of Russia from 1946 to 2023

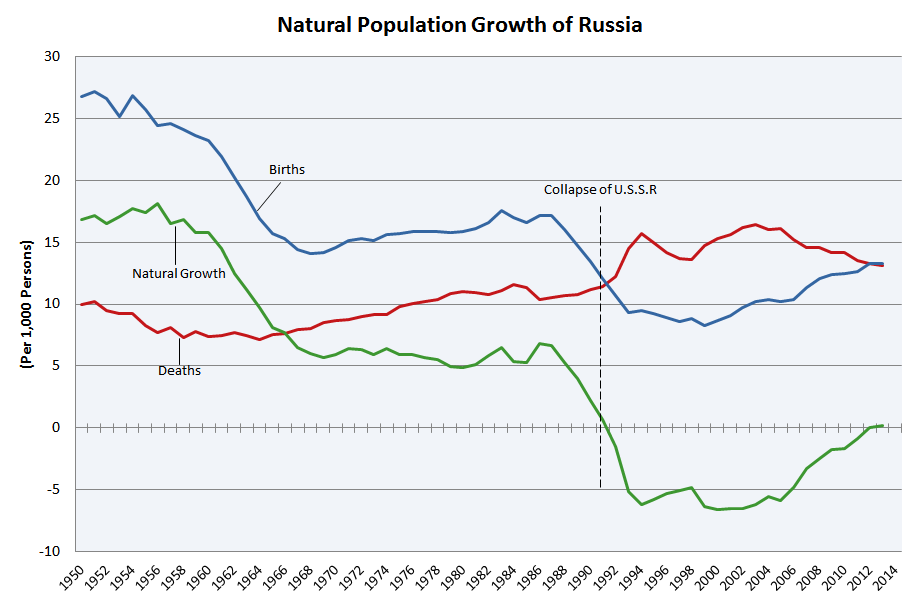
Birth and death rates and natural growth, 1950–2014

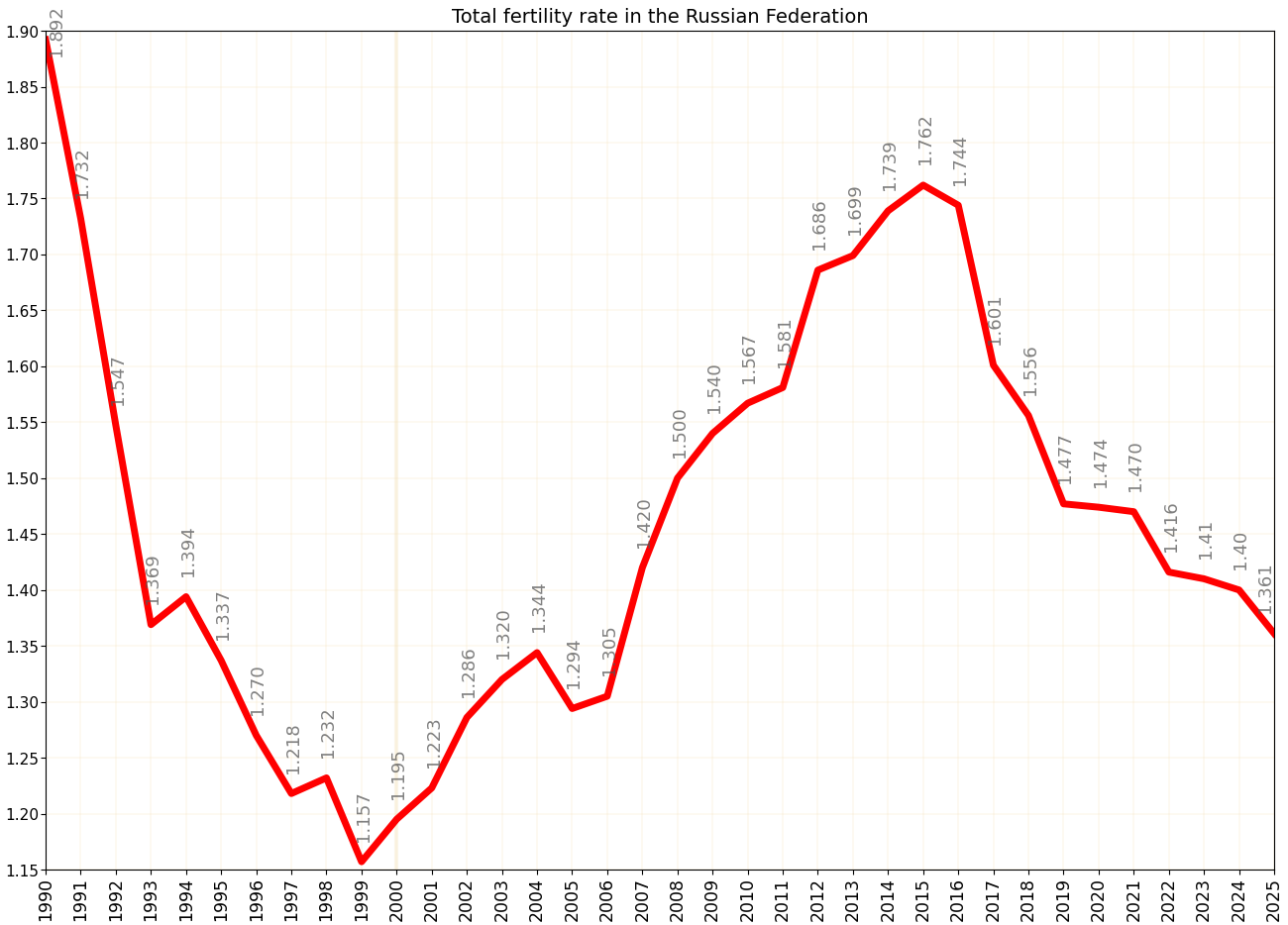
Total fertility rate in Russia, 1990—2024

Between 1993 and 2008 there was a great decrease in the country's population from 148 to 143 million. There was a huge 50% decrease in the number of births per year from 2.5 million in 1987 to 1.2 million since 1997, but the current 1.37 fertility rate is still higher than that of the 1990s.

At the beginning of 2022, 320,400 babies were born between January and March, 16,600 fewer than January–March 2021. There were nearly twice as many deaths (584,700) as births. The crude birth rate – 8.9 per 100,000 inhabitants – was the lowest since the year 2000.

Russia has a low fertility rate with 1.37 children per woman in 2025, below 2.1 children per woman, which must be the number reached to maintain its population. As a result of their low fertility for decades, the Russian population is one of the oldest in the world with an average of 40.3 years. In February 2026, the Russian Ministry of Health approved new guidelines recommending that women indicating that they do not want to have children are referred to psychotherapy to "foster a positive attitude toward motherhood". Speaking with France24 under only their first names, several Russian women criticized the plan.

View source data.

=== Historical fertility rates ===
TFR of Russia from 1843 to 2016

The total fertility rate is the number of children born to each woman. It is based on fairly good data for the entire period. Sources: Our World In Data and Gapminder Foundation.

In many of the years from 1843 to 1917, Russia had the highest total fertility rate in the world. These elevated fertility rates did not lead to population growth due to high mortality rate, the casualties of the Russian Revolution, the two world wars and to a lesser extent the political killings. From 1840 to 1910 Russia's total fertility rate remained consistently elevated between 6.7 and 7.4 children per woman.

TFR	Years									
TFR	1840	1841	1842	1843	1844	1845	1846	1847	1848	1849
TFR	7	7	7	7.01	7.02	7.03	7.05	7.06	7.08	7.08
TFR	1850	1851	1852	1853	1854	1855	1856	1857	1858	1859
TFR	7.07	7.07	7.07	7.06	7.05	7.03	7.01	7	6.98	6.97
TFR	1860	1861	1862	1863	1864	1865	1866	1867	1868	1869
TFR	6.95	6.93	6.95	6.96	6.98	6.99	7.01	7.02	6.51	6.87
TFR	1870	1871	1872	1873	1874	1875	1876	1877	1878	1879
TFR	6.74	7.03	6.85	7.24	7.17	7.15	7.02	6.87	6.58	6.98
TFR	1880	1881	1882	1883	1884	1885	1886	1887	1888	1889
TFR	6.8	6.66	7.03	6.89	6.83	6.74	6.47	6.61	6.96	6.8
TFR	1890	1891	1892	1893	1894	1895	1896	1897	1898	1899
TFR	6.71	7.44	6.57	7.17	7.18	7.34	7.43	7.52	7.28	7.36
TFR	1900	1901	1902	1903	1904	1905	1906	1907	1908	1909
TFR	7.36	7.2	7.36	7.2	7.24	6.72	7.04	7.08	7.44	7.12
TFR	1910	1911	1912	1913	1914	1915	1916	1917	1918	1919
TFR	7.2	7.2	7.2	6.96	6.88	3.36	5.2	5.04	5.72	3.44
TFR	1920	1921	1922	1923	1924	1925	1926			
TFR	6.72	4.72	6	6.48	6.72	6.8	6.72			

Years	1941	1942	1943	1944	1945
	4.60	2.96	1.68	1.72	1.92

==== Historical crude birth rates ====
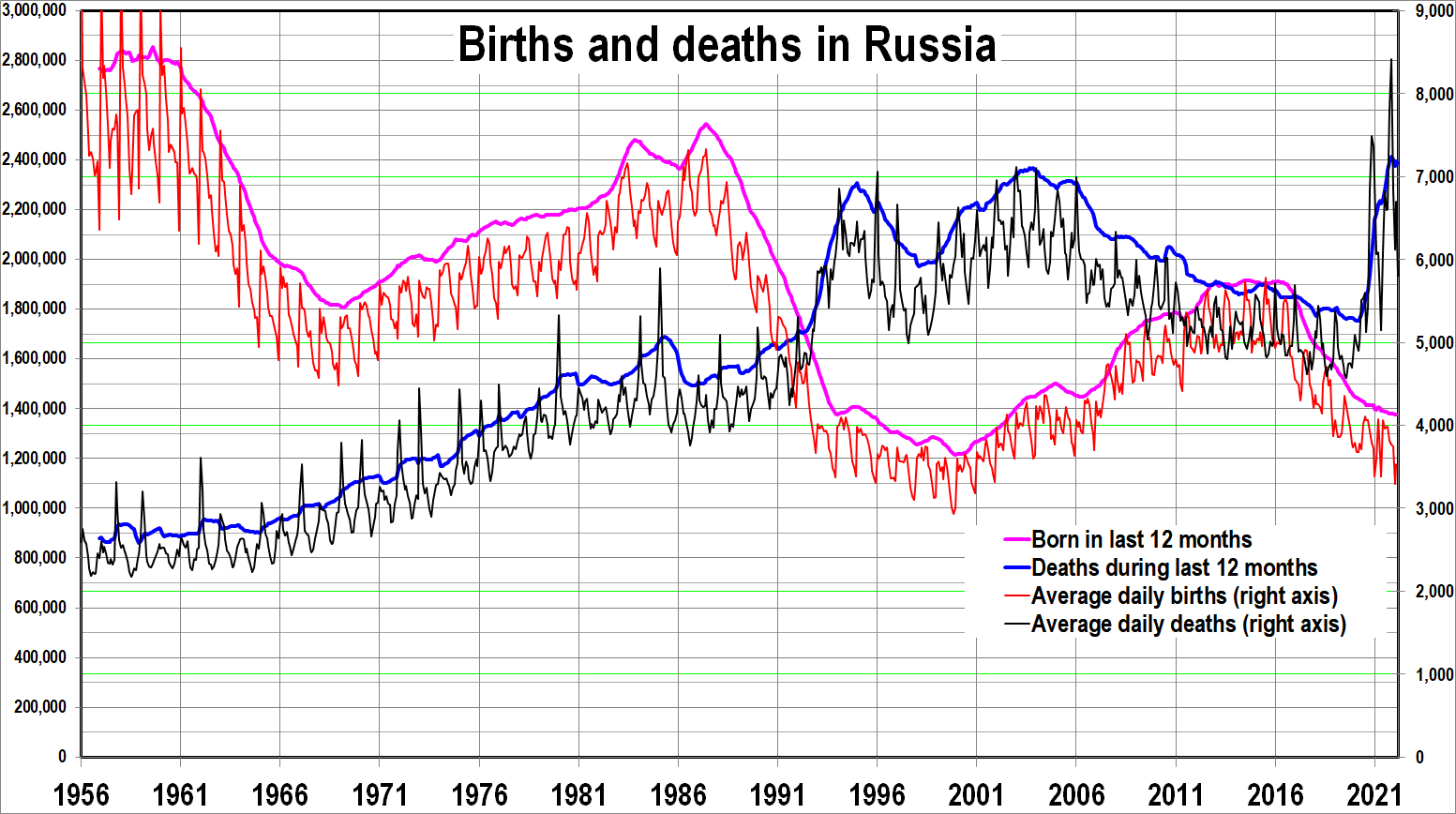
Births and deaths in Russia: a) moving 12-month sum, b) daily average, Jan 1956 – Feb 2022

Years	1801–1810	1811–1820	1821–1830	1831–1840	1841–1850	1851–1860
Crude birth rates of Russia	43.7	40.0	42.7	45.6	49.7	52.4

Years	1861–1870	1871–1880	1881–1890	1891–1900	1901–1910	1911–1914	18th century (only Orthodox)	1801–1860 (only Orthodox)	
Crude birth rates of Russia	50.3	50.4	50.4	49.2	46.8	43.9	51.0	50.0	-

=== Age structure ===
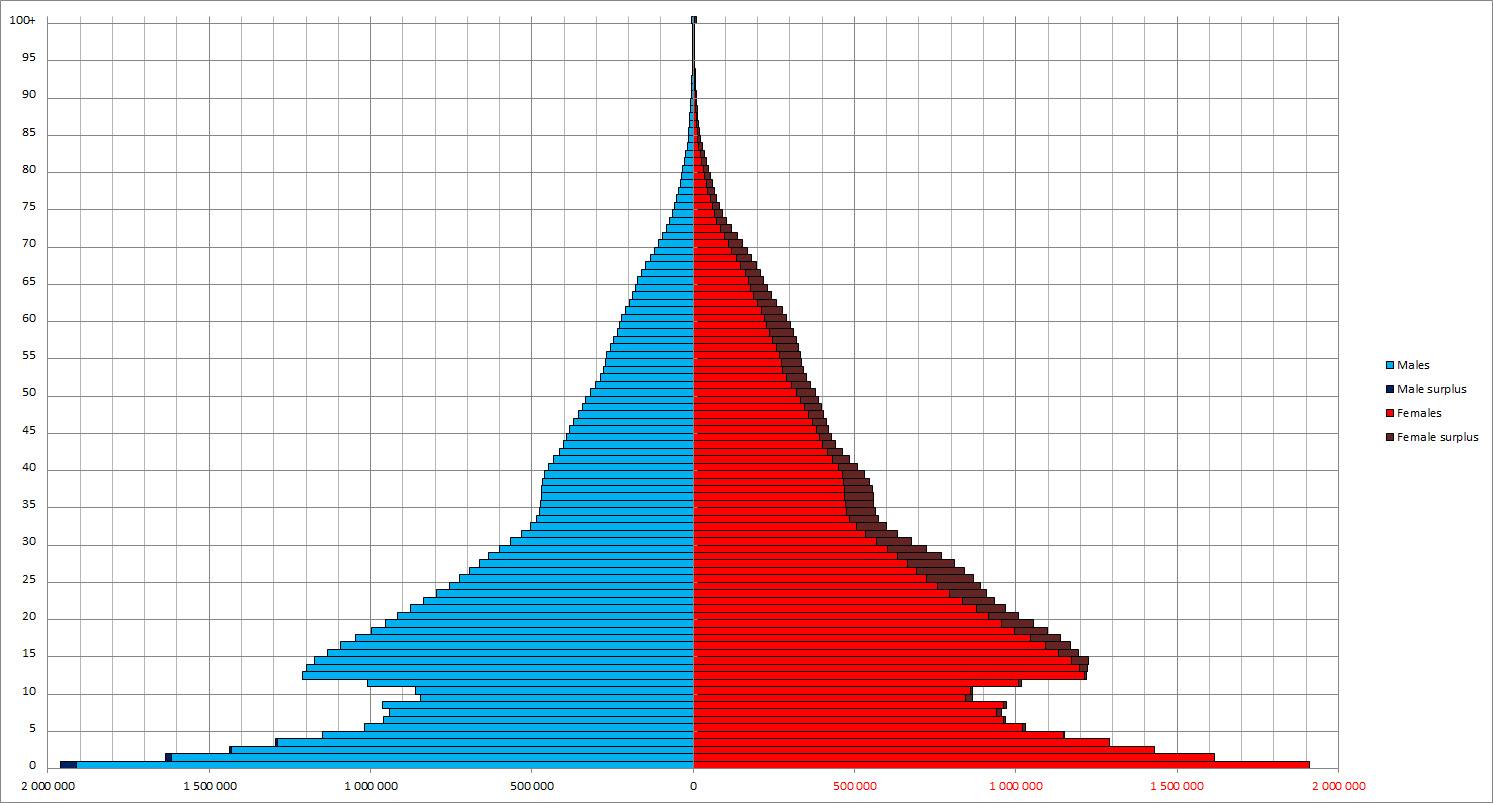
Population pyramid in 1927

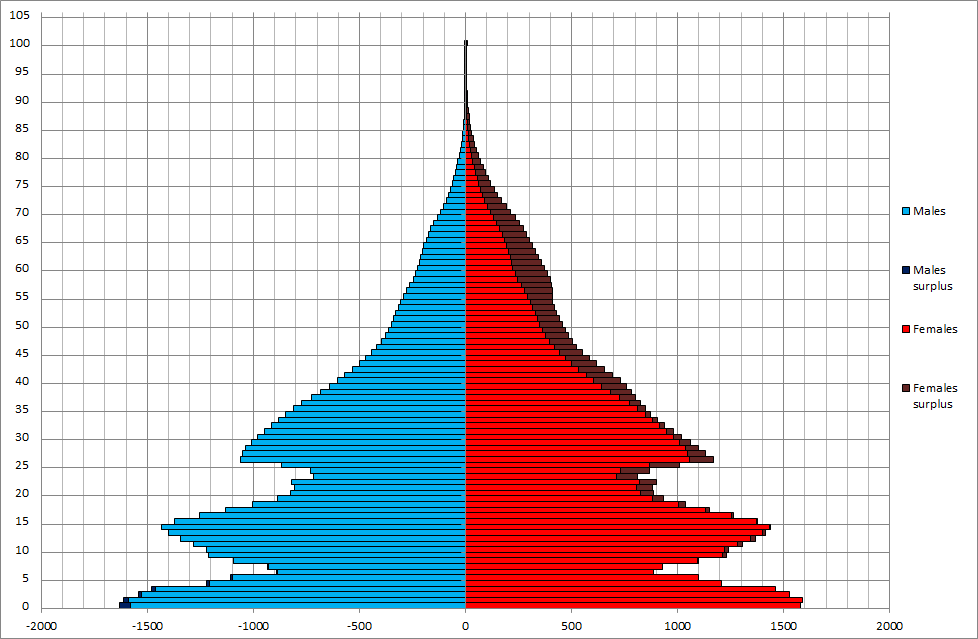
Population pyramid in 1941

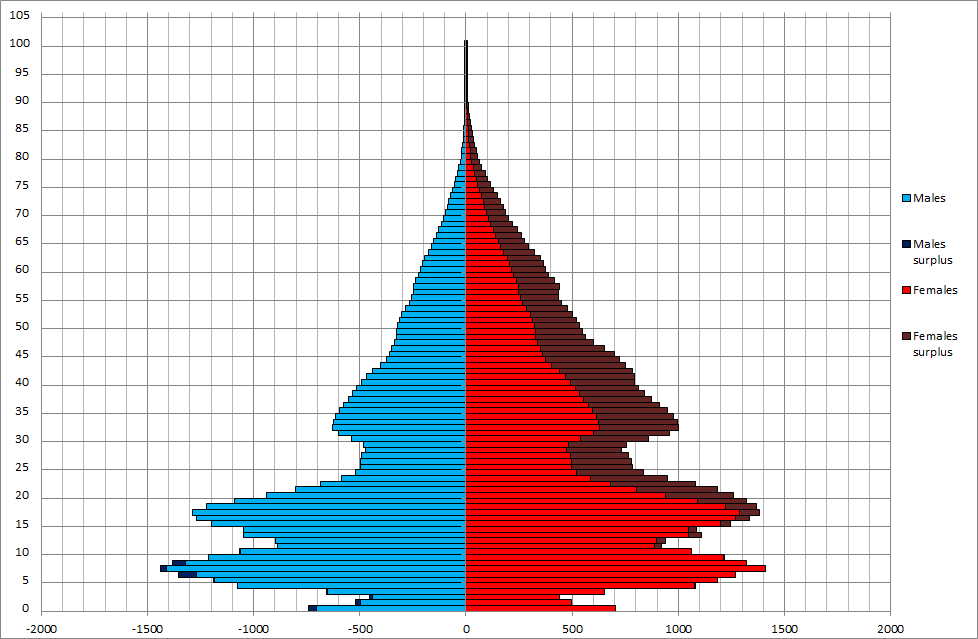
Population pyramid in 1946

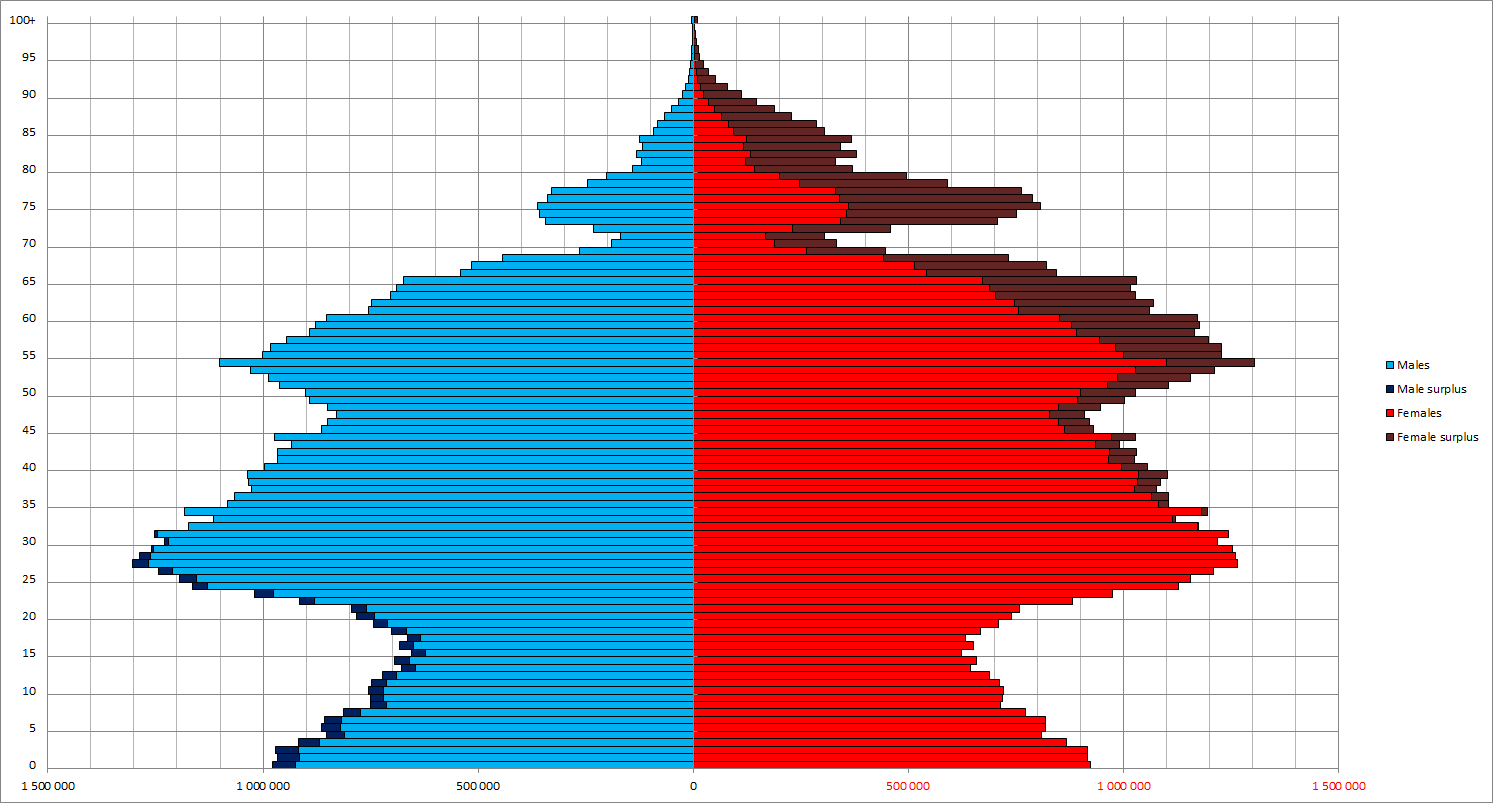
Population pyramid in 2015

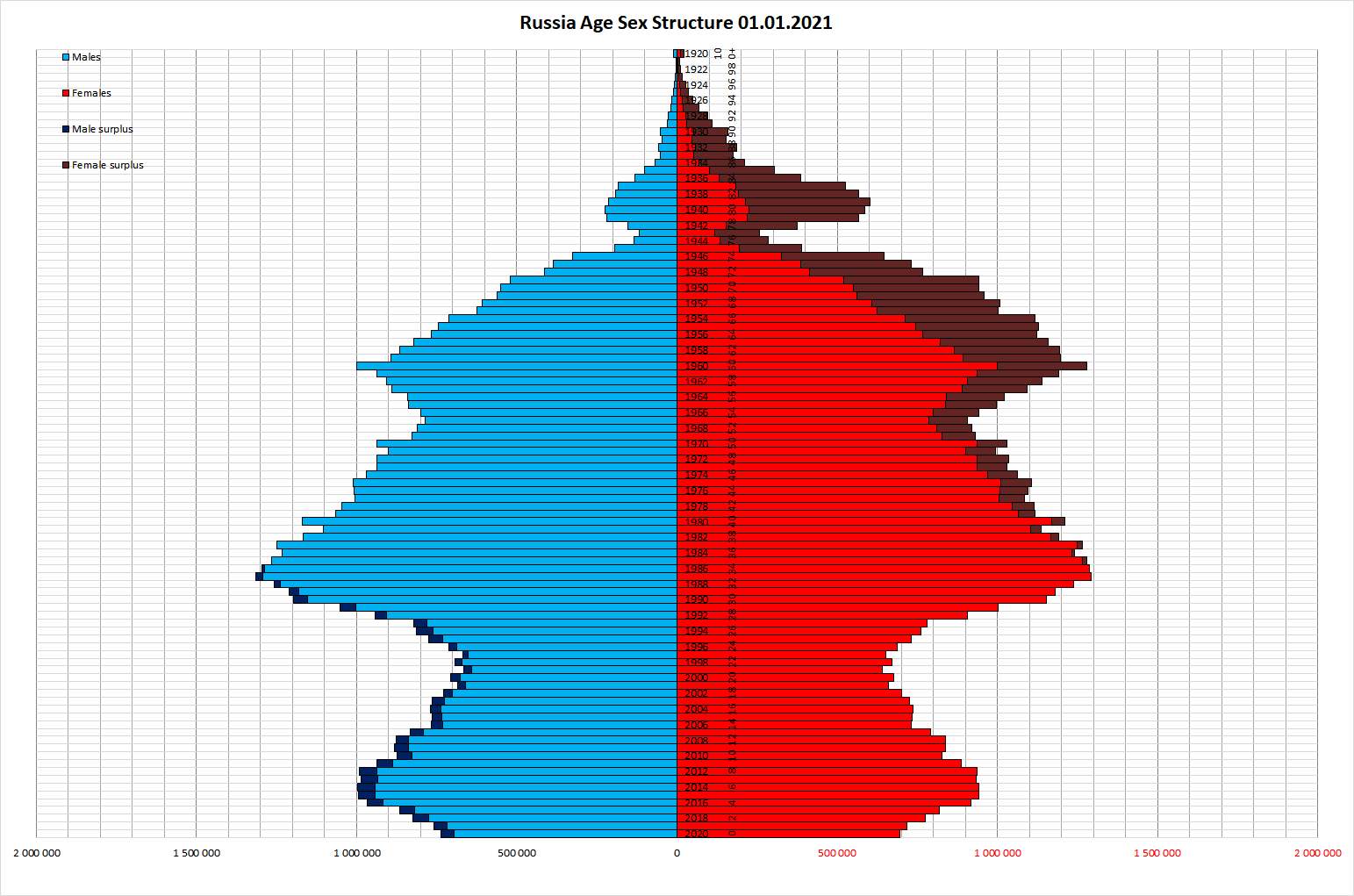
Population pyramid in 2021

Russia animated population pyramid 1946-2023

=== Structure of the population ===
Population estimates by sex and age group (01.VII.2012):

Age group	Male	Female	Total	%
Total	66,264,910	76,936,820	143,201,730	100
0–4	4,377,526	4,155,682	8,533,208	5.97
5–9	3,762,806	3,588,032	7,350,838	5.13
10–14	3,396,364	3,231,761	6,628,125	4.63
15–19	3,776,026	3,615,840	7,391,866	5.16
20–24	5,708,187	5,515,543	11,223,730	7.84
25–29	6,262,379	6,179,628	12,442,007	8.69
30–34	5,583,513	5,647,636	11,231,149	7.84
35–39	5,087,565	5,331,818	10,419,383	7.28
40–44	4,589,504	4,861,983	9,451,487	6.60
45–49	4,632,279	5,151,813	9,784,092	6.83
50–54	5,279,364	6,219,077	11,498,441	8.03
55–59	4,480,855	5,817,559	10,298,414	7.19
60–64	3,523,990	5,010,867	8,534,857	5.96
65–69	1,602,839	2,571,671	4,174,510	2.92
70–74	1,989,724	3,975,348	5,965,072	4.17
75–79	1,179,476	2,709,384	3,888,860	2.72
80–84	722 151	2,073,803	2,795,954	1.95
85–89	253 028	1,008,627	1,261,655	0.88
90–94	46 736	219 427	266 163	0.19
95–99	8 634	43 988	52 622	0.04
100+	1 964	7 333	9 297	0.01
Age group	Male	Female	Total	Percent
0–14	11,536,696	10,975,475	22,512,171	15.72
15–64	48,923,662	53,351,764	102,275,426	71.42
65+	5,804,552	12,609,581	18,414,133	12.86

Historical population
Year	Pop.	±% p.a.
0	9,000,000	—
1000	9,000,000	+0.00%
1200	14,500,000	+0.24%
1500	14,700,000	+0.00%
1600	18,000,000	+0.20%
1700	18,000,000	+0.00%
1800	25,000,000	+0.33%
1900	73,000,000	+1.08%
1926	93,000,000	+0.94%
1930	100,000,000	+1.83%
1960	119,000,000	+0.58%
1970	130,079,000	+0.89%
1979	137,552,000	+0.62%
1989	147,386,000	+0.69%
2000	146,597,000	−0.05%
2010	142,849,000	−0.26%
2021	144,700,000	+0.12%

==== Median age ====
Life expectancy in Russia since 1896

total: 40.7 years. Country comparison to the world: 51st
male: 37.6 years
female: 43.5 years (2021 est.)

=== Life expectancy ===
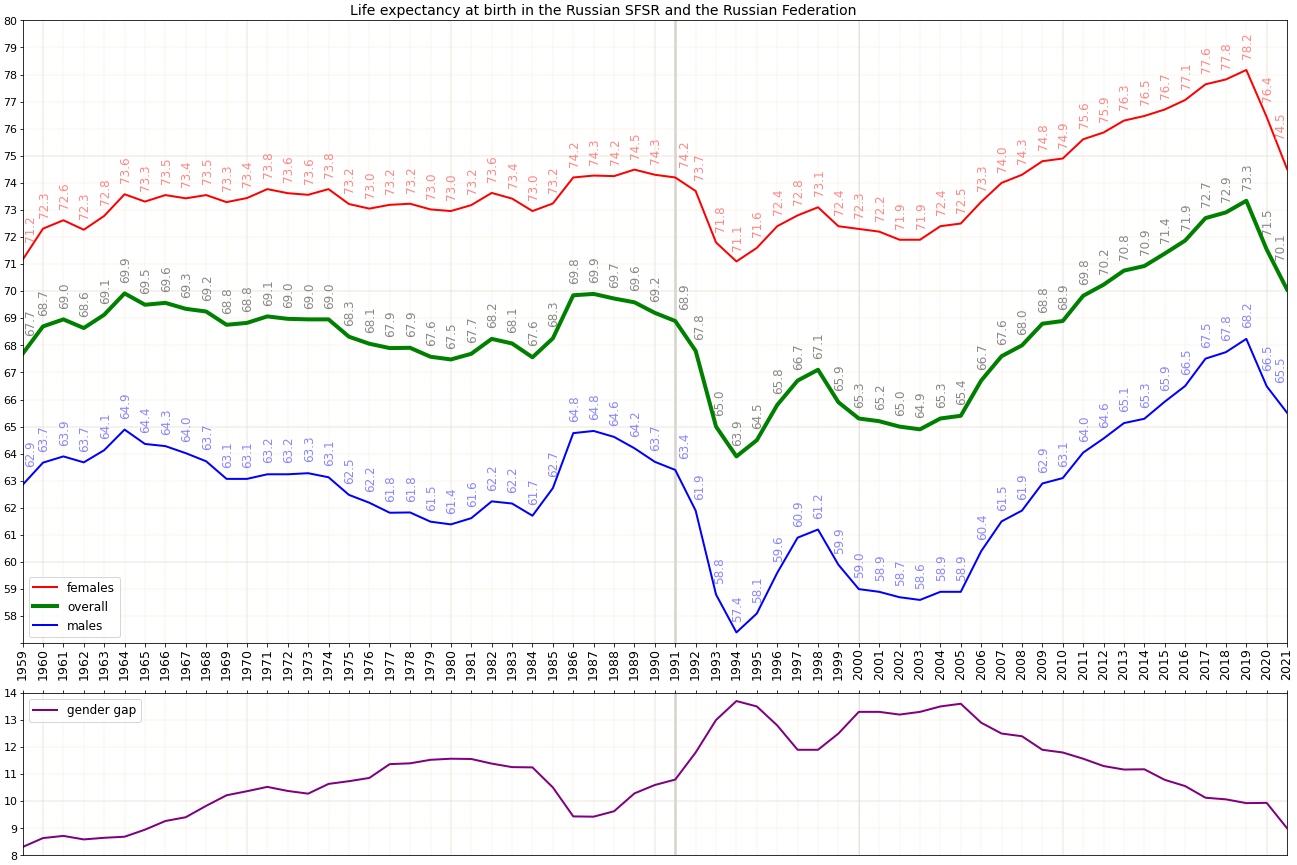
Life expectancy in Russia since 1959 by gender

total population: 70.06 years for a child born in 2021, decreasing from 73.34 in 2019
male: 65.51 years (2021)
female: 74.51 years (2021)

Infant mortality rate

total: 4.5 deaths/1,000 live births (2020)
male: 5.0 deaths/1,000 live births (2020)
female: 3.9 deaths/1,000 live births (2020)

== Vital statistics ==
Before WW1

Notable events in Russian demographics:

- 1872, 1885, 1892-1893, 1909-1910 – major cholera outbreaks
- 1877-1878 – Russo-Turkish War
- 1891-1892 – Famine
- 1889-1895 – Russian Flu
- 1904-1905 – Russo-Japanese War
- 1905 – First Russian revolution

Year	Average population	Live births	Deaths	Natural change	Crude birth rate (per 1,000)	Crude death rate (per 1,000)	Natural change (per 1,000)	Total fertility rate
1867	45,606,000	2,293,000	1,647,000	646,000	50.3	36.1	14.2	7.02
1868	46,262,000	2,165,000	1,762,000	403,000	46.8	38.1	8.7	6.51
1869	46,668,000	2,301,000	1,773,000	528,000	49.3	38.0	11.3	6.87
1870	47,202,000	2,285,000	1,626,000	659,000	48.4	34.4	14.0	6.74
1871	47,870,000	2,413,000	1,809,000	604,000	50.4	37.8	12.6	7.03
1872	48,482,000	2,380,000	1,963,000	417,000	49.1	40.5	8.6	6.85
1873	48,903,000	2,533,000	1,769,000	764,000	51.8	36.2	15.6	7.24
1874	49,679,000	2,549,000	1,744,000	805,000	51.3	35.1	16.2	7.17
1875	50,497,000	2,585,000	1,738,000	847,000	51.2	34.4	16.8	7.15
1876	51,359,000	2,583,000	1,778,000	805,000	50.3	34.6	15.7	7.02
1877	52,177,000	2,572,000	1,785,000	787,000	49.3	34.2	15.1	6.87
1878	52,976,000	2,506,000	2,023,000	483,000	47.3	38.2	9.1	6.58
1879	53,463,000	2,673,000	1,855,000	818,000	50.0	34.7	15.3	6.98
1880	54,294,000	2,650,000	1,921,000	729,000	48.8	35.4	13.4	6.80
1881	55,033,000	2,631,000	1,830,000	801,000	47.8	33.3	14.5	6.66
1882	55,844,000	2,815,000	2,205,000	610,000	50.4	39.5	10.9	7.03
1883	56,461,000	2,791,000	2,070,000	721,000	49.4	36.7	12.7	6.89
1884	57,191,000	2,802,000	1,873,000	929,000	49.0	32.7	16.3	6.83
1885	58,136,000	2,815,000	2,015,000	800,000	48.4	34.7	13.7	6.74
1886	58,947,000	2,742,000	1,837,000	905,000	46.5	31.2	15.3	6.47
1887	59,866,000	2,844,000	1,930,000	914,000	47.5	32.2	15.3	6.61
1888	60,793,000	3,034,000	1,962,000	1,072,000	49.9	32.3	17.6	6.96
1889	61,884,000	3,020,000	2,135,000	885,000	48.8	34.5	14.3	6.80
1890	62,782,000	3,026,000	2,241,000	785,000	48.2	35.7	12.5	6.71
1891	63,577,000	3,383,000	2,537,000	846,000	53.2	39.9	13.3	7.44
1892	64,435,000	3,041,000	3,033,000	8,000	47.2	47.1	0.1	6.57
1893	64,443,000	3,307,000	2,477,000	830,000	51.3	38.4	12.9	7.17
1894	65,284,000	3,358,000	2,471,000	887,000	51.4	37.8	13.6	7.18
1895	66,184,000	3,477,000	2,597,000	880,000	52.5	39.2	13.3	7.34
1896	67,076,000	3,559,000	2,522,000	1,037,000	53.1	37.6	15.5	7.43
1897	68,128,000	3,576,000	2,391,000	1,185,000	52.5	35.1	17.4	7.52
1898	69,334,000	3,543,000	2,638,000	905,000	51.1	38.0	13.0	7.28
1899	70,251,000	3,622,000	2,382,000	1,240,000	51.6	33.9	17.7	7.36
1900	71,514,000	3,732,000	2,488,000	1,244,000	52.2	34.8	17.4	7.36
1901	72,780,000	3,771,000	2,674,000	1,097,000	51.8	36.7	16.5	7.20
1902	73,895,000	3,868,000	2,647,000	1,221,000	52.3	35.8	16.5	7.36
1903	75,136,000	3,924,000	2,533,000	1,391,000	52.2	33.7	18.5	7.20
1904	76,553,000	3,999,000	2,553,000	1,446,000	52.2	33.3	18.9	7.24
1905	77,989,000	3,778,000	2,734,000	1,044,000	48.4	35.1	13.3	6.72
1906	79,365,000	4,028,000	2,660,000	1,368,000	50.7	33.5	17.2	7.04
1907	80,874,000	4,079,000	2,571,000	1,508,000	50.4	31.8	18.6	7.08
1908	82,871,000	3,957,000	2,631,000	1,326,000	47.7	31.8	15.9	7.44
1909	85,962,000	4,077,000	2,844,000	1,233,000	47.4	33.1	14.3	7.12
1910	87,960,000	4,227,000	3,003,000	1,224,000	48.1	34.1	14.0	7.20
1911	89,832,000	4,287,000	2,731,000	1,556,000	47.7	30.4	17.3	7.18
1912	92,533,000	4,228,000	2,772,000	1,456,000	45.7	30.0	15.7	7.04
1913	94,260,000	4,553,000	3,026,000	1,527,000	48.3	32.1	16.2	6.96
1914	96,307,000	4,317,000	2,756,000	1,561,000	44.8	28.6	16.2	6.88

=== Interwar period ===
Notable events in Russian demographics:

- 1929-1933 – Dekulakization
- 1930-1933 – Famine
- 1936 – Abortion ban
- 1936-1938 – Great Purge
- 1939-1940 – Winter War

	Average population	Live births	Deaths	Natural change	Crude birth rate (per 1,000)	Crude death rate (per 1,000)	Natural change (per 1,000)	Crude migration change (per 1,000)	Total fertility rate	Life expectancy	
	Average population	Live births	Deaths	Natural change	Crude birth rate (per 1,000)	Crude death rate (per 1,000)	Natural change (per 1,000)	Crude migration change (per 1,000)	Total fertility rate	male	female
1927	94,596,000	4,688,000	2,705,000	1,983,000	49.6	28.6	21.0	0.8	6.73	33.7	37.9
1928	96,654,000	4,723,000	2,589,000	2,134,000	48.9	26.8	22.1	-1.5	6.56	35.9	40.4
1929	98,644,000	4,633,000	2,819,000	1,814,000	47.0	28.6	18.4	-0.4	6.23	33.7	38.2
1930	100,419,000	4,413,000	2,738,000	1,675,000	43.9	27.3	16.7	-1.5	5.83	34.6	38.7
1931	101,948,000	4,412,000	3,090,000	1,322,000	43.3	30.3	13.0	-1.3	5.63	30.7	35.5
1932	103,136,000	4,058,000	3,077,000	981,000	39.3	29.8	9.5	-5.1	5.09	30.5	35.7
1933	102,706,000	3,313,000	5,239,000	−1,926,000	32.3	51.0	−18.8	20.9	4.15	15.2	19.5
1934	102,922,000	2,923,000	2,659,000	264,000	28.7	26.1	2.6	-2.6	3.57	30.5	35.7
1935	102,684,000	3,577,000	2,421,000	1,156,000	34.8	23.6	11.3	0.6	4.31	33.1	38.4
1936	103,904,000	3,899,000	2,719,000	1,180,000	37.5	26.2	11.4	2.6	4.54	30.4	35.7
1937	105,358,000	4,377,000	2,760,000	1,617,000	41.5	26.2	15.3	0.7	5.08	30.5	40.0
1938	107,044,000	4,379,000	2,739,000	1,640,000	40.9	25.6	15.3	0.9	4.99	31.7	42.5
1939	108,785,000	4,329,000	2,600,000	1,729,000	39.8	23.9	15.9	-1.7	4.91	34.9	42.6
1940	110,333,000	3,814,000	2,561,000	1,253,000	34.6	23.2	11.4		4.26	35.7	41.9

=== After WW2 ===
Notable events in Russian demographics:

- 1946-1948 – famine
- 1991 – collapse of the USSR
- 2014 – Annexation of Crimea
- 2020-2022 – COVID-19 Pandemic
- 2022-present – Russo-Ukrainian war

Vital Statistics of Russia as of 1946
	Total average population (1 January 1993 onwards)	Live births	Deaths	Natural change	Crude birth rate (per 1,000)	Crude death rate (per 1,000)	Natural change (per 1,000)	Crude migration change (per 1,000)	Total fertility rate (Note: In fertility rates, 2.1 and above is a stable population and has been marked blue, 2 and below leads to an aging population and the result is that the population decreases.)	Fertility		Life Expectancy			Abortions reported (including miscarriages)
	Total average population (1 January 1993 onwards)	Live births	Deaths	Natural change	Crude birth rate (per 1,000)	Crude death rate (per 1,000)	Natural change (per 1,000)	Crude migration change (per 1,000)	Total fertility rate	urban	rural	male	female	total	Abortions reported (including miscarriages)
1946	98,028,000	2,546,000	1,210,000	1,336,000	26.0	12.3	13.6	-5.4	2.81			46.6	55.3		
1947	98,834,000	2,715,000	1,680,000	1,035,000	27.5	17.0	10.5	-1.7	2.94			39.9	49.8		
1948	99,706,000	2,516,000	1,310,000	1,206,000	25.2	13.1	12.1	2.5	2.60			47.0	56.0		
1949	101,160,000	3,089,000	1,187,000	1,902,000	30.5	11.7	18.8	-2.3	3.21			51.0	59.8		
1950	102,833,000	2,859,000	1,180,000	1,679,000	27.8	11.5	16.3	-0.7	2.89			52.3	61.0		
1951	104,439,000	2,938,000	1,210,000	1,728,000	28.1	11.6	16.5	0	2.92			52.3	60.6		
1952	106,164,000	2,928,000	1,138,000	1,790,000	27.6	10.7	16.9	-1.2	2.87			54.6	62.9		
1953	107,828,000	2,822,000	1,118,000	1,704,000	26.2	10.4	15.8	1.0	2.73			55.5	63.9		
1954	109,643,000	3,048,000	1,133,000	1,915,000	27.8	10.3	17.5	0.1	2.97			55.9	64.1		
1955	111,572,000	2,942,000	1,037,000	1,905,000	26.4	9.3	17.1	-1.4	2.82			58.3	66.6		
1956	113,327,000	2,827,000	956,000	1,871,000	24.9	8.4	16.5	-1.4	2.73			60.1	68.8		
1957	115,035,000	2,880,000	1,017,000	1,863,000	25.0	8.8	16.2	-1.3	2.75			59.7	68.4		3,407,398
1958	116,749,000	2,861,000	931,000	1,930,000	24.5	8.0	16.5	-3.2	2.69			61.8	70.4		3,939,362
1959	118,307,000	2,796,228	920,225	1,876,003	23.6	7.8	15.9	-2.4	2.58	2.03	3.34	62.84	71.14	67.65	4,174,111
1960	119,906,000	2,782,353	886,090	1,896,263	23.2	7.4	15.8	-1.8	2.56	2.06	3.26	63.67	72.31	68.67	4,373,042
1961	121,586,000	2,662,135	901,637	1,760,498	21.9	7.4	14.5	-1.8	2.47	2.04	3.08	63.91	72.63	68.92	4,759,040
1962	123,128,000	2,482,539	949,648	1,532,891	20.2	7.7	12.4	-1.1	2.36	1.98	2.92	63.67	72.27	68.58	4,925,124
1963	124,514,000	2,331,505	932,055	1,399,450	18.7	7.5	11.2	-1.3	2.31	1.93	2.87	64.12	72.78	69.05	5,134,100
1964	125,744,000	2,121,994	901,751	1,220,243	16.9	7.2	9.7	-1.7	2.19	1.88	2.66	64.89	73.58	69.85	5,376,200
1965	126,749,000	1,990,520	958,789	1,031,731	15.7	7.6	8.1	-1.3	2.14	1.82	2.58	64.37	73.33	69.44	5,463,300
1966	127,608,000	1,957,763	974,299	983,464	15.3	7.6	7.7	-1.8	2.13	1.85	2.58	64.29	73.55	69.51	5,322,500
1967	128,361,000	1,851,041	1,017,034	834,007	14.4	7.9	6.5	-1.2	2.03	1.79	2.46	64.02	73.43	69.30	5,005,000
1968	129,037,000	1,816,509	1,040,096	776,413	14.1	8.1	6.0	-1.2	1.98	1.75	2.44	63.73	73.56	69.26	4,872,900
1969	129,660,000	1,847,592	1,106,640	740,952	14.2	8.5	5.7	-1.1	1.99	1.78	2.44	63.07	73.29	68.74	4,751,100
1970	130,252,000	1,903,713	1,131,183	772,530	14.6	8.7	5.9	-0.7	2.00	1.77	2.52	63.07	73.44	68.86	4,837,700
1971	130,934,000	1,974,637	1,143,359	831,278	15.1	8.7	6.3	-0.5	2.02	1.80	2.60	63.24	73.77	69.12	4,838,749
1972	131,687,000	2,014,638	1,181,802	832,836	15.3	9.0	6.3	-0.6	2.03	1.81	2.59	63.24	73.62	69.02	4,765,900
1973	132,434,000	1,994,621	1,214,204	780,417	15.1	9.2	5.9	0	1.96	1.75	2.55	63.28	73.56	69.00	4,747,037
1974	133,217,000	2,079,812	1,222,495	857,317	15.6	9.2	6.4	0.2	2.00	1.78	2.63	63.12	73.77	68.99	4,674,050
1975	134,092,000	2,106,147	1,309,710	796,437	15.7	9.8	5.9	1.1	1.97	1.76	2.64	62.48	73.23	68.35	4,670,700
1976	135,026,000	2,146,711	1,352,950	793,761	15.9	10.0	5.9	1.2	1.96	1.74	2.62	62.19	73.04	68.10	4,757,055
1977	135,979,000	2,156,724	1,387,986	768,738	15.9	10.2	5.7	1.2	1.92	1.72	2.58	61.82	73.19	67.97	4,686,063
1978	136,922,000	2,179,030	1,417,377	761,653	15.9	10.4	5.6	0.5	1.90	1.70	2.55	61.83	73.23	68.01	4,656,057
1979	137,758,000	2,178,542	1,490,057	688,485	15.8	10.8	5.0	0.3	1.87	1.67	2.54	61.49	73.02	67.73	4,544,040
1980	138,483,000	2,202,779	1,525,755	677,024	15.9	11.0	4.9	0.4	1.87	1.68	2.51	61.38	72.96	67.70	4,506,249
1981	139,221,000	2,236,608	1,524,286	712,322	16.1	10.9	5.1	1.0	1.88	1.69	2.55	61.61	73.18	67.92	4,400,676
1982	140,067,420	2,328,044	1,504,200	823,844	16.6	10.7	5.9	1.2	1.96	1.76	2.63	62.24	73.64	68.38	4,462,825
1983	141,056,000	2,478,322	1,563,995	914,327	17.6	11.1	6.5	0.6	2.11	1.89	2.76	62.15	73.41	68.15	4,317,729
1984	142,061,000	2,409,614	1,650,866	758,748	17.0	11.6	5.3	1.5	2.06	1.86	2.69	61.71	72.96	67.67	4,361,959
1985	143,033,000	2,375,147	1,625,266	749,881	16.6	11.4	5.2	2.7	2.05	1.87	2.68	62.72	73.23	68.33	4,552,443
1986	144,156,000	2,485,915	1,497,975	987,940	17.2	10.4	6.9	1.0	2.18	1.98	2.83	64.77	74.22	69.95	4,579,400
1987	145,386,000	2,499,974	1,531,585	968,389	17.2	10.5	6.7	1.0	2.22	1.974	3.187	64.83	74.26	69.96	4,385,627
1988	146,505,000	2,348,494	1,569,112	779,382	16.0	10.7	5.3	0.4	2.13	1.90	3.06	64.61	74.25	69.81	4,608,953
1989	147,342,000	2,160,559	1,583,743	576,816	14.7	10.7	3.9	0.4	2.01	1.83	2.63	64.20	74.50	69.73	4,427,713
1990	147,969,000	1,988,858	1,655,993	332,865	13.4	11.2	2.2	0.7	1.892	1.698	2.600	63.76	74.32	69.36	4,103,425
1991	148,394,000	1,794,626	1,690,657	103,969	12.1	11.4	0.7	0.3	1.732	1.531	2.447	63.41	74.23	69.11	3,608,421
1992	148,538,000	1,587,644	1,807,441	-219,797	10.7	12.2	-1.5	1.7	1.547	1.351	2.219	61.96	73.71	67.98	3,436,695
1993	148,561,694	1,378,983	2,129,339	-750,356	9.3	14.3	-5.1	3.7	1.369	1.200	1.946	58.80	71.85	65.24	3,243,957
1994	148,355,867	1,408,159	2,301,366	-893,207	9.5	15.5	-6.0	6.7	1.394	1.238	1.917	57.38	71.07	63.93	3,060,237
1995	148,459,937	1,363,806	2,203,811	-840,005	9.2	14.9	-5.7	4.6	1.337	1.193	1.813	58.11	71.60	64.62	2,766,362
1996	148,291,638	1,304,638	2,082,249	-777,611	8.8	14.1	-5.2	3.4	1.270	1.140	1.705	59.61	72.41	65.89	2,652,038
1997	148,028,613	1,259,943	2,015,779	-755,836	8.5	13.6	-5.1	3.6	1.218	1.097	1.624	60.84	72.85	66.79	2,498,716
1998	147,802,133	1,283,292	1,988,744	-705,452	8.7	13.5	-4.8	3.0	1.232	1.109	1.643	61.19	73.12	67.14	2,346,138
1999	147,539,426	1,214,689	2,144,316	-929,627	8.3	14.6	-6.3	1.9	1.157	1.045	1.534	59.86	72.42	65.99	2,181,153
2000	146,890,128	1,266,800	2,225,332	-958,532	8.6	15.2	-6.5	2.5	1.195	1.089	1.554	58.99	72.25	65.38	2,138,800
2001	146,303,611	1,311,604	2,254,856	-943,252	9.0	15.4	-6.5	2.0	1.223	1.124	1.564	58.88	72.16	65.30	2,114,700
2002	145,649,334	1,396,967	2,332,272	-935,305	9.6	16.1	-6.4	1.7	1.286	1.189	1.633	58.68	71.90	64.95	1,944,481
2003	144,963,650	1,477,301	2,365,826	-888,525	10.2	16.4	-6.1	1.8	1.319	1.223	1.666	58.53	71.85	64.84	1,864,647
2004	144,333,586	1,502,477	2,295,402	-792,925	10.4	15.9	-5.5	1.8	1.344	1.253	1.654	58.91	72.36	65.31	1,797,567
2005	143,801,046	1,457,376	2,303,935	-846,559	10.2	16.1	-5.9	2.0	1.294	1.207	1.576	58.92	72.47	65.37	1,675,693
2006	143,236,582	1,479,637	2,166,703	-687,066	10.3	15.1	-4.8	2.2	1.305	1.210	1.601	60.43	73.34	66.69	1,582,398
2007	142,862,692	1,610,122	2,080,445	-470,323	11.3	14.6	-3.3	2.5	1.416	1.294	1.798	61.46	74.02	67.61	1,479,010
2008	142,747,535	1,713,947	2,075,954	-362,007	12.0	14.5	-2.6	2.5	1.502	1.372	1.912	61.92	74.28	67.99	1,385,600
2009	142,737,196	1,761,687	2,010,543	-248,856	12.3	14.1	-1.7	2.4	1.542	1.415	1.941	62.87	74.79	68.78	1,292,389
2010	142,833,502	1,788,948	2,028,516	-239,568	12.5	14.2	-1.7	1.9	1.567	1.439	1.983	63.09	74.88	68.94	1,186,108
2011	142,865,433	1,796,629	1,925,720	-129,091	12.6	13.5	-0.9	2.2	1.582	1.442	2.056	64.04	75.61	69.83	1,124,880
2012	143,170,950	1,902,084	1,906,335	-4,251	13.3	13.3	0.0	2.0	1.691	1.541	2.215	64.56	75.86	70.24	1,063,982
2013	143,585,935	1,895,822	1,871,809	24,013	13.3	13.0	0.2	2.0	1.707	1.551	2.264	65.14	76.31	70.77	1,012,399
2014 (Note: Russian data after 2014 includes the populations of areas annexed by Russia during the Russo-Ukrainian War that are internationally recognized as parts of Ukraine (e.g., Crimea starting in 2014). The annexation of Crimea and Sevastopol is internationally recognized only by a handful of countries like Belarus and Nicaragua. The Russian annexation of Donetsk, Kherson, Luhansk and Zaporizhzhia oblasts is internationally only recognized by North Korea. Following the fall of the Assad regime, Syria's new government withdrew Assad's recognition of all Russian annexations in Ukraine and expressed support for Ukraine's territorial integrity within its internationally recognized borders.)	144,025,334	1,942,683	1,912,347	30,336	13.3	13.0	0.3	17.8	1.750	1.588	2.318	65.29	76.49	70.93	929,963
2015	146,743,989	1,940,579	1,908,541	32,038	13.3	13.1	0.2	1.7	1.777	1.678	2.111	65.92	76.71	71.39	848,180
2016	147,182,316	1,888,729	1,891,015	-2,286	12.9	12.9	0.0	1.8	1.762	1.672	2.056	66.50	77.06	71.87	836,611
2017	147,580,009	1,690,307	1,826,125	-135,818	11.5	12.4	-0.9	1.4	1.621	1.527	1.923	67.51	77.64	72.70	779,848
2018	147,797,071	1,604,344	1,828,910	-224,566	10.9	12.5	-1.6	0.9	1.579	1.489	1.870	67.75	77.81	72.91	661,045
2019	147,840,696	1,481,074	1,798,307	-317,233	10.1	12.3	-2.2	2.0	1.504	1.427	1.754	68.24	78.17	73.34	621,652
2020	147,959,284	1,436,514	2,138,586	-702,072	9.8	14.6	-4.8	0.6	1.505	1.433	1.739	66.49	76.43	71.54	553,500
2021	147,455,745	1,398,253	2,441,594	-1,043,341	9.6	16.8	-7.2	3.0	1.505	1.436	1.734	65.51	74.51	70.06	490,419
2022	146,980,061	1,304,087	1,898,644	-594,557	8.9	13.0	-4.1	10.0	1.416	1.36	1.59	67.60	77.79	72.76	395,201
2023	146,447,424	1,264,354	1,764,618	-500,264	8.6	12.1	-3.5	2.8	1.410			68.04	78.74	73.41	
2024	146,150,789	1,222,408	1,818,635	-596,227	8.4	12.5	-4.1	2.9	1.400					72.84	
2025	146,028,325	1,165,000	1,832,000 (e)	-667,000	8.0	12.5	-4.5		1.374						

	Urban live births	Urban deaths	Urban natural change	Urban crude birth rate (per 1,000)	Urban crude death rate (per 1,000)	Urban natural change (per 1,000)	Rural live births	Rural deaths	Rural natural change	Rural crude birth rate (per 1,000)	Rural crude death rate (per 1,000)	Rural natural change (per 1,000)
1950	1,171,250	436,792	734,458	26.1	9.7	16.4	1,574,747	594,218	980,529	27.5	10.4	17.1
1960	1,332,812	436,709	896,103	20.4	6.7	13.7	1,449,541	449,831	1,000,160	26.5	8.2	18.3
1970	1,205,207	646,129	559,078	14.8	7.9	6.9	698,506	485,054	213,452	14.3	10.0	4.3
1980	1,535,723	970,256	565,467	15.8	10.0	5.8	667,056	555,499	111,557	16.1	13.4	2.7
1990	1,386,247	1,140,613	245,634	12.7	10.5	2.2	602,611	515,380	87,231	15.5	13.2	2.3
1995	933,460	1,554,182	−620,722	8.7	14.4	−5.7	430,346	649,269	−219,283	10.9	16.5	−5.6
2000	886,908	1,564,034	−677,126	8.3	14.6	−6.3	379,892	661,298	−281,406	9.8	17.1	−7.3
2001	928,642	1,592,254	−663,612	8.7	14.9	−6.2	382,962	662,602	−279,640	10.0	17.3	−7.3
2002	998,056	1,638,822	−640,766	9.4	15.4	−6.0	398,911	693,450	−294,539	10.5	18.2	−7.7
2003	1,050,565	1,657,569	−607,004	9.9	15.6	−5.7	426,736	708,257	−281,521	11.1	18.4	−7.3
2004	1,074,247	1,606,894	−532,647	10.1	15.2	−5.1	428,230	688,508	−260,278	11.2	18.1	−6.9
2005	1,036,870	1,595,762	−558,892	9.8	15.1	−5.3	420,506	708,173	−287,667	11.0	18.6	−7.6
2006	1,044,540	1,501,245	−456,705	10.0	14.3	−4.3	435,097	665,458	−230,361	11.4	17.4	−6.0
2007	1,120,741	1,445,411	−324,670	10.7	13.8	−3.1	489,381	635,034	−145,653	12.9	16.7	−3.8
2008	1,194,820	1,443,529	−248,709	11.4	13.8	−2.4	519,127	632,425	−113,298	13.7	16.7	−3.0
2009	1,237,615	1,397,591	−159,976	11.8	13.3	−1.5	524,072	612,952	−88,880	13.9	16.3	−2.4
2010	1,263,893	1,421,734	−157,841	12.0	13.5	−1.5	520,055	606,782	−81,727	14.0	16.1	−2.1
2011	1,270,047	1,356,696	−88,649	12.0	12.8	−0.8	526,582	569,024	−42,442	14.1	15.2	−1.1
2012	1,355,674	1,353,635	2,039	12.8	12.8	0.0	546,410	552,700	−6,290	14.7	14.8	−0.1
2013	1,357,310	1,332,505	24,805	12.8	12.5	0.3	538,512	539,304	−792	14.5	14.5	−0.0
2014	1,394,860	1,362,810	32,050	12.9	12.6	0.3	547,823	549,537	−1,714	14.4	14.5	−0.1
2015	1,455,283	1,361,891	93,392	13.4	12.6	0.8	485,296	546,650	−61,354	12.8	14.4	−1.6
2016	1,426,591	1,354,944	71,597	13.1	12.4	0.7	462,138	536,071	−73,933	12.2	14.2	−2.0
2017	1,269,527	1,310,235	−40,708	11.6	12.0	−0.4	420,780	515,890	−95,110	11.2	13.7	−2.5
2018	1,205,231	1,317,703	−112,472	11.0	12.0	−1.0	399,113	511,207	−112,094	10.6	13.6	−3.0
2019	1,115,337	1,301,650	−186,313	10.2	11.9	−1.7	365,737	496,657	−130,920	9.8	13.3	−3.5
2020	1,079,887	1,568,773	−488,886	9.9	14.4	−4.5	356,627	569,813	−213,186	9.6	15.3	−5.7
2021	1,047,736	1,799,381	−751,645	9.6	16.5	−6.9	350,522	642,218	−291,696	9.5	17.5	−7.9

=== Current vital statistics ===
Since June 2025 the Federal State Statistics Service (Rosstat) has stopped publishing regular birth and death statistics for the country. This deviation from a long-established pattern of monthly publication coincided with the total birth numbers falling below the previous historic minimum of 1,214,000, a major setback for Putin's long-stated natalist policy.

Period	Live births	Deaths	Natural increase
January-September 2025	888,000		
January-September 2026	837,000		
Difference	-51,000 (-5,74%)	▲	▲

View source data.
View source data.
View source data.

All numbers for the Russian Federation in this section do not include the Ukrainian regions of Kherson, Zaporizhzhia, Donetsk and Luhansk, which Russia annexed in September 2022 and which are currently partly under Russian military control. The annexation is internationally recognized only by North Korea.

=== Total fertility rate of federal subjects ===
Federal subject	2015	2025
Russian Federation	1.762	1.361
Chechnya	2.818	2.537
Tuva	3.222	2.198
Yamalo Nenets A.O.	2.146	1.998
Altai Republic	2.719	1.762
Ingushetia	2.082	1.719
Dagestan	2.015	1.76
Tyumen Oblast	2.031	1.695
Sakhalin Oblast	1.971	1.66
Chukotka	1.993	1.746
Nenets Autonomous Okrug	2.482	1.631
Khanty–Mansi A.O. (Yugra)	2.018	1.569
Astrakhan Oblast	1.97	1.574
Irkutsk Oblast	2.015	1.57
Kabardino-Balkaria	1.722	1.563
North Ossetia–Alania	1.907	1.533
Zabaykalsky Krai	2.059	1.483
Kamchatka Krai	1.882	1.569
Kurgan Oblast	2.164	1.501
Sverdlovsk Oblast	1.942	1.464
Buryatia	2.257	1.449
Sakha (Yakutia)	2.152	1.481
Komi Republic	2.003	1.492
Krasnodar Krai	1.834	1.495
Perm Krai	2.021	1.435
Karelia	1.842	1.51
Republic of Crimea^{[a]}	1.813	1.464
Orenburg Oblast	2.029	1.372
Kostroma Oblast	1.942	1.402
Khakassia	1.956	1.426
Novosibirsk Oblast	1.789	1.413
Moscow	1.413	1.434
Chelyabinsk Oblast	1.842	1.371
Tatarstan	1.838	1.434
Khabarovsk Krai	1.837	1.38
Omsk Oblast	1.943	1.406
Kirov Oblast	1.945	1.418
Primorsky Krai	1.744	1.385
Amur Oblast	1.826	1.339
Arkhangelsk Oblast	1.859	1.342
Krasnoyarsk Krai	1.822	1.362
Murmansk Oblast	1.738	1.291
Adygea	1.643	1.367
Chuvashia	1.907	1.318
Bashkortostan	1.91	1.299
Jewish Autonomous Oblast	1.989	1.383
Karachay-Cherkessia	1.523	1.351
Udmurtia	2.034	1.302
Moscow Oblast	1.569	1.318
Vologda Oblast	1.905	1.348
Kaluga Oblast	1.78	1.255
Mari El	1.957	1.34
Samara Oblast	1.697	1.291
Ivanovo Oblast	1.678	1.235
Rostov Oblast	1.611	1.255
Pskov Oblast	1.72	1.257
Kalmykia	1.822	1.182
Nizhny Novgorod Oblast	1.683	1.287
Yaroslavl Oblast	1.708	1.211
Ulyanovsk Oblast	1.715	1.223
Stavropol Krai	1.607	1.232
Tver Oblast	1.688	1.229
Saint Petersburg	1.568	1.235
Kursk Oblast	1.707	1.181
Altai Krai	1.83	1.175
Magadan Oblast	1.629	1.21
Novgorod Oblast	1.768	1.187
Voronezh Oblast	1.511	1.202
Kaliningrad Oblast	1.738	1.198
Oryol Oblast	1.596	1.111
Lipetsk Oblast	1.663	1.157
Kemerovo Oblast	1.715	1.109
Tomsk Oblast	1.618	1.129
Tambov Oblast	1.489	1.138
Penza Oblast	1.546	1.113
Bryansk Oblast	1.646	1.108
Vladimir Oblast	1.706	1.051
Tula Oblast	1.533	1.132
Ryazan Oblast	1.622	1.119
Volgograd Oblast	1.558	1.081
Belgorod Oblast	1.561	1.075
Saratov Oblast	1.572	1.064
Smolensk Oblast	1.528	1
Sevastopol^{[a]}	1.757	1.069
Mordovia	1.363	1.001
Leningrad Oblast	1.224	0.903

== Immigration ==
In 2006, in a bid to compensate for the country's demographic decline, the Russian government started simplifying immigration laws. New citizenship rules introduced in April 2014 allowing eligible citizens from former Soviet republics to obtain Russian citizenship, have gained strong interest among Russian-speaking residents of those countries (i.e. Russians, Germans, Belarusians and Ukrainians).

There are an estimated four million undocumented immigrants from the ex-Soviet states in Russia. In 2012, the Russian Federal Security Service's Border Service stated there had been an increase in undocumented migration from the Middle East and Southeast Asia (Note that these were Temporary Contract Migrants) Under legal changes made in 2012, undocumented immigrants who are caught will be banned from reentering the country for 10 years.

Since the collapse of the USSR, most immigrants have come from Ukraine, Uzbekistan, Tajikistan, Azerbaijan, Armenia, Kyrgyzstan, Moldova, Kazakhstan, Turkmenistan, Belarus, from poor areas of China, and from Vietnam and Laos.

=== Worker migration ===
Temporary migrant workers in Russia consists of about 7 million people. Most of the temporary workers come from Central Asia (mostly from Uzbekistan, Tajikistan and Kyrgyzstan), the South Caucasus (mostly from Armenia and Azerbaijan), and East Asia (mostly from poor areas of China, from Vietnam and Laos). Most of them work in the construction, cleaning and in the household industries. They primarily live in cities such as Moscow and Moscow Oblast, Saint Petersburg, Yekaterinburg, Novosibirsk, Kazan, Nijniy Novgorod, Vladivostok, Samara, Krasnodar, Ufa, Sochi, Khabarovsk, Krasnoyarsk, Chelyabinsk, Rostov on Don, Volgograd, Omsk, Tyumen, Voronezh, Perm and others. The mayor of Moscow said that Moscow cannot do without worker migrants. New laws are in place that require worker migrants to be fluent in Russian, know Russian history and laws.

== Emigration ==
The 2022 Russian invasion of Ukraine has led to considerable emigration, with over 300,000 Russian citizens and residents estimated to have left Russia by mid-March 2022, at least 500,000 by the end of August 2022, and an additional 400,000 by early October. The total number of political refugees, economic migrants, and conscientious objectors is thought to be more than 900,000. In addition to evading criminal prosecution for opposing the invasion, and fear of being conscripted after President Vladimir Putin's 21 September 2022 announcement of partial mobilization, those fleeing voiced reasons such as disagreement with the war, the uselessness and cruelty of the war, sympathy for Ukraine, disagreement with the political roots of the war with Ukraine, the rejection of killing, and an assessment that Russia is no longer the place for their family.

In September 2026, PBS News Hour reported a second smaller emigration wave as Russians complained about Russian authorities placing restrictions on using the internet, Ukrainian drone attacks inside Russia causing fuel shortages, declining economy, uncertain future and shrinking freedoms in the country. Fears over another military mobilization also contributed to Russians either leaving or contemplating to leave the country.

== Occupied and annexed regions ==
Russia has encouraged or even forced people in occupied or annexed regions to become Russian citizens, a procedure known as passportization. This includes the Donetsk, Kherson, Luhansk and Zaporizhzhia oblasts and the Autonomous Republic of Crimea of Ukraine, as well as South Ossetia and Abkhazia in Georgia.

== Employment and income ==
Unemployment, youth ages 15–24
total: 12%. Country comparison to the world: 72nd
male: 15.3%
female: 16.9% (2015 est.)

== Health ==
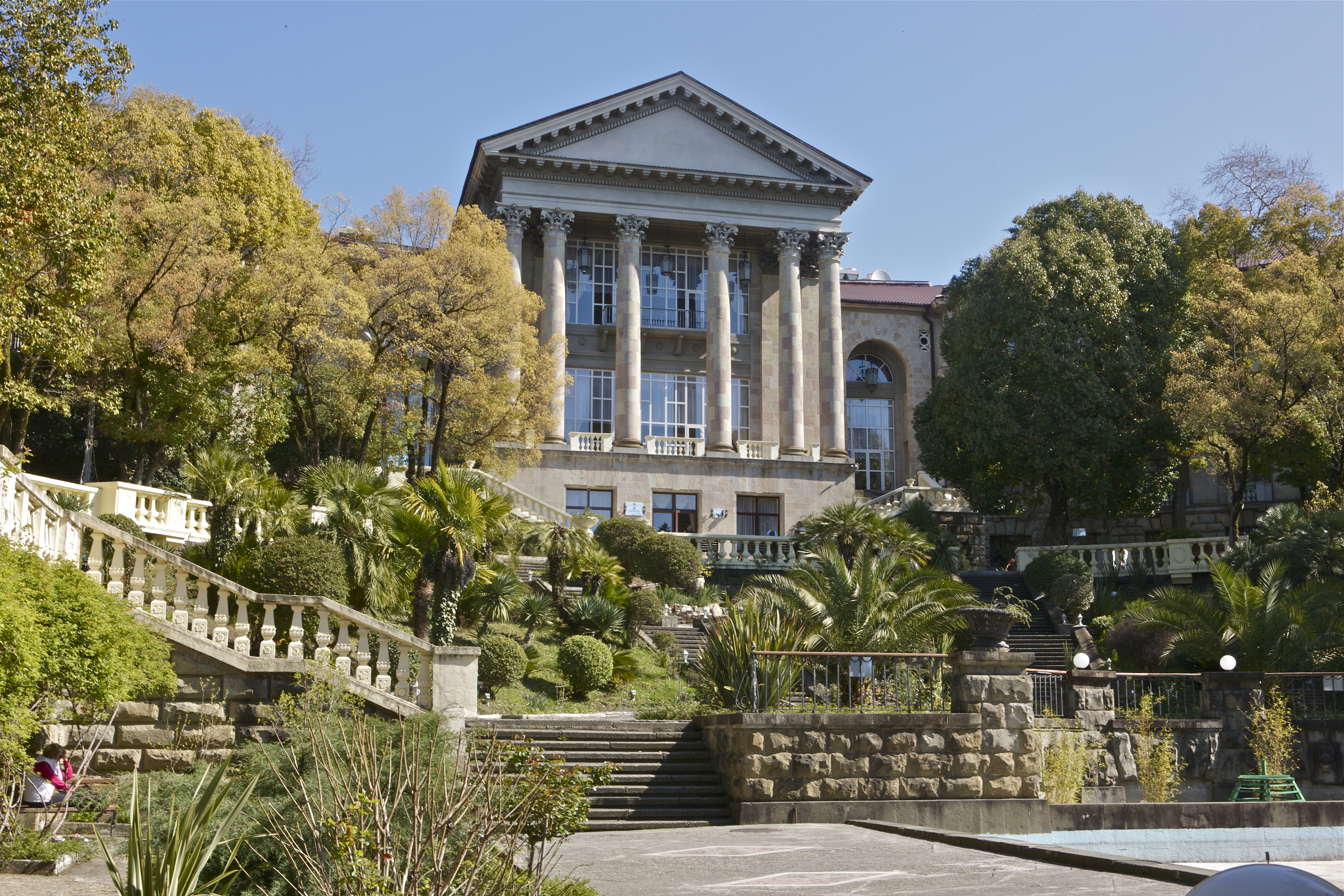
Metallurg, a Soviet-era sanatorium in Sochi

Russia's constitution guarantees free, universal health care for all Russian citizens, through a compulsory state health insurance program. The Ministry of Health of the Russian Federation oversees the Russian public healthcare system, and the sector employs more than two million people. Federal regions also have their own departments of health that oversee local administration. A separate private health insurance plan is needed to access private healthcare in Russia.

Russia spent 5.32% of its GDP on healthcare in 2018. Its healthcare expenditure is notably lower than other developed nations. Russia has one of the world's most female-biased sex ratios, with 0.859 males to every female with more older females than males prevailing, due to its high male mortality rate in later age. In 2019, the overall life expectancy in Russia at birth was 73.2 years (68.2 years for males and 78.0 years for females), and it had a very low infant mortality rate (5 per 1,000 live births).

The principal causes of death in Russia are cardiovascular diseases. Obesity is a prevalent health issue in Russia; 61.1% of Russian adults were overweight or obese in 2016. However, Russia's historically high alcohol consumption rate is the biggest health issue in the country, as it remains one of the world's highest, despite a stark decrease in the last decade. Smoking is another health issue in the country. The country's high suicide rate, although on the decline, remains a significant social issue.

=== COVID-19 pandemic ===
Russia had one of the highest number of confirmed cases in the world. Analysis of excess deaths from official government demographic statistics, based on births and deaths and excluding migration, showed that Russia had its biggest ever annual population drop in peacetime, with the population declining by 997,000 between October 2020 and September 2021, which demographer Alexei Raksha interpreted as being primarily due to the COVID-19 pandemic.

== Ethnic groups ==
Ethnic groups in Russia

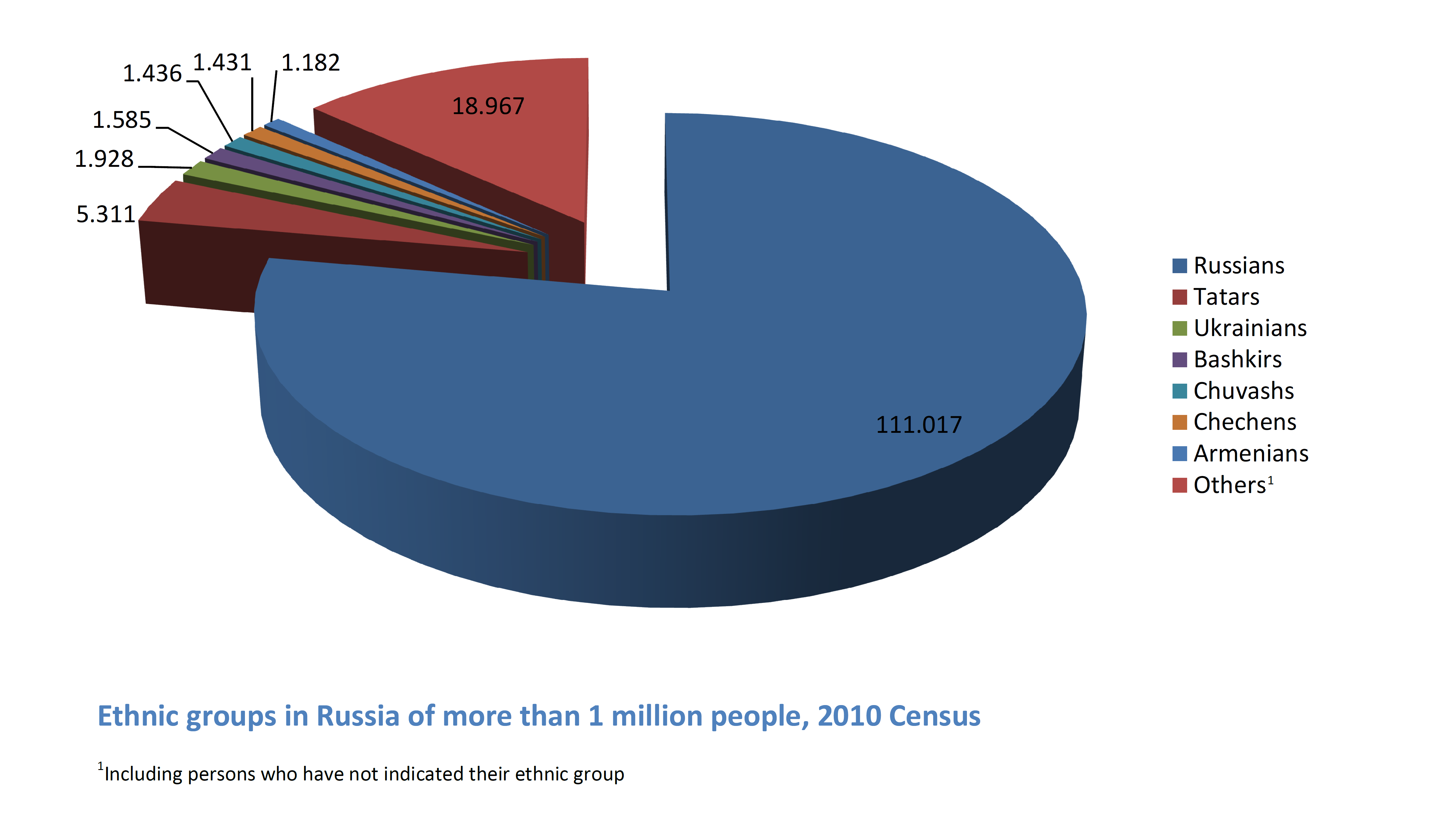
Ethnic groups in Russia of more than 1 million people in 2010

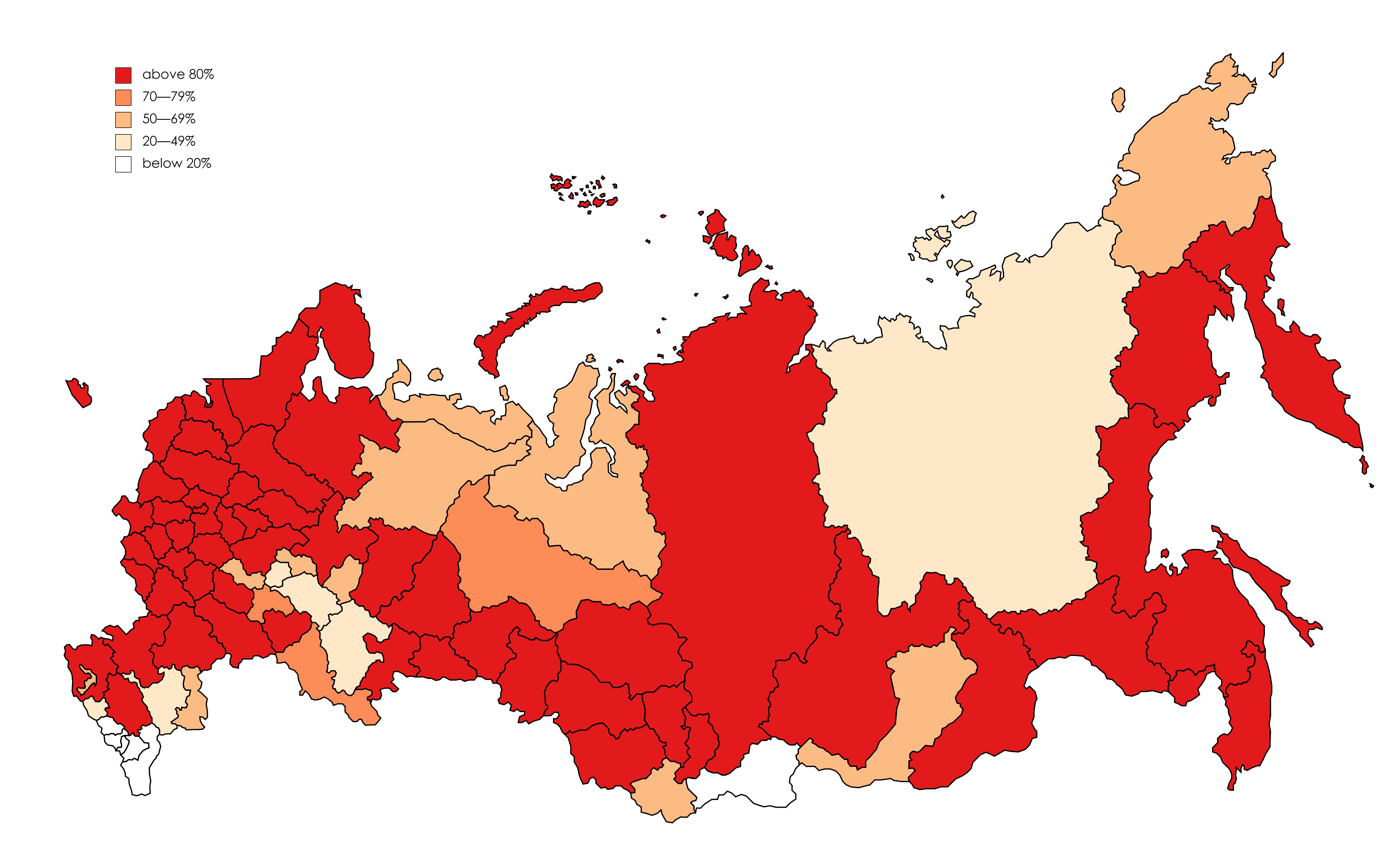
Percentage of ethnic Russians by region in 2021 (excluding non-stated ethnicity people)

Russia is a multinational state, with many subnational entities associated with different minorities. There are over 193 ethnic groups nationwide. In the 2021 census, nearly 71.73% of the population identified as ethnic Russians (among those stating their ethnicity), and while approximately 19% of the total population identified with various ethnic minority groups. The percentage of total Russian population that did not publicly indicate any ethnic identity in the census increased from 3.94% in 2010 to 11.27% in 2021.

According to the 2021 Russian census, the number of ethnic Russians decreased by nearly 5.43 million, from roughly 111 million people in 2010 to approximately 105.5 million in 2021. In 2010, four-fifths of Russia's population originated from West of the Ural Mountains — of which the vast majority were Slavs, with a substantial minority of Finno-Ugric and Germanic peoples. Turkic peoples form a large minority, and are spread around pockets across the vast nation. Various distinct ethnic groups also inhabit the North Caucasus. Other minorities include Mongolian peoples (Buryats and Kalmyks), the Indigenous peoples of Siberia, a historical Jewish population, and the Koryo-saram (including Sakhalin Koreans).

According to the United Nations, Russia's immigrant population was the third-largest in the world as recently as 2016, numbering over 11.6 million; most of which are from post-Soviet states, mainly from Central Asia. Due to a decline in immigrant population and increases in other countries, Russia has the tenth largest immigrant population with 7.6 million as of 2024. There are 22 republics in Russia, who have their own ethnicities, cultures, and languages. In 12 of them in 2021, ethnic Russians constitute a minority:

Ethnic Russian-minority regions in Russia in 2021
Republic	ethnic Russians (%)
Bashkortostan	37.5%
Chechnya	1.2%
Chuvashia	30.7%
Dagestan	3.3%
Ingushetia	0.7%
Kabardino-Balkaria	19.8%
Kalmykia	25.7%
Karachay-Cherkessia	27.5%
North Ossetia–Alania	18.9%
Sakha (Yakutia)	32.6%
Tatarstan	40.3%
Tuva	10.1%

== Languages ==
Minority languages across Russia

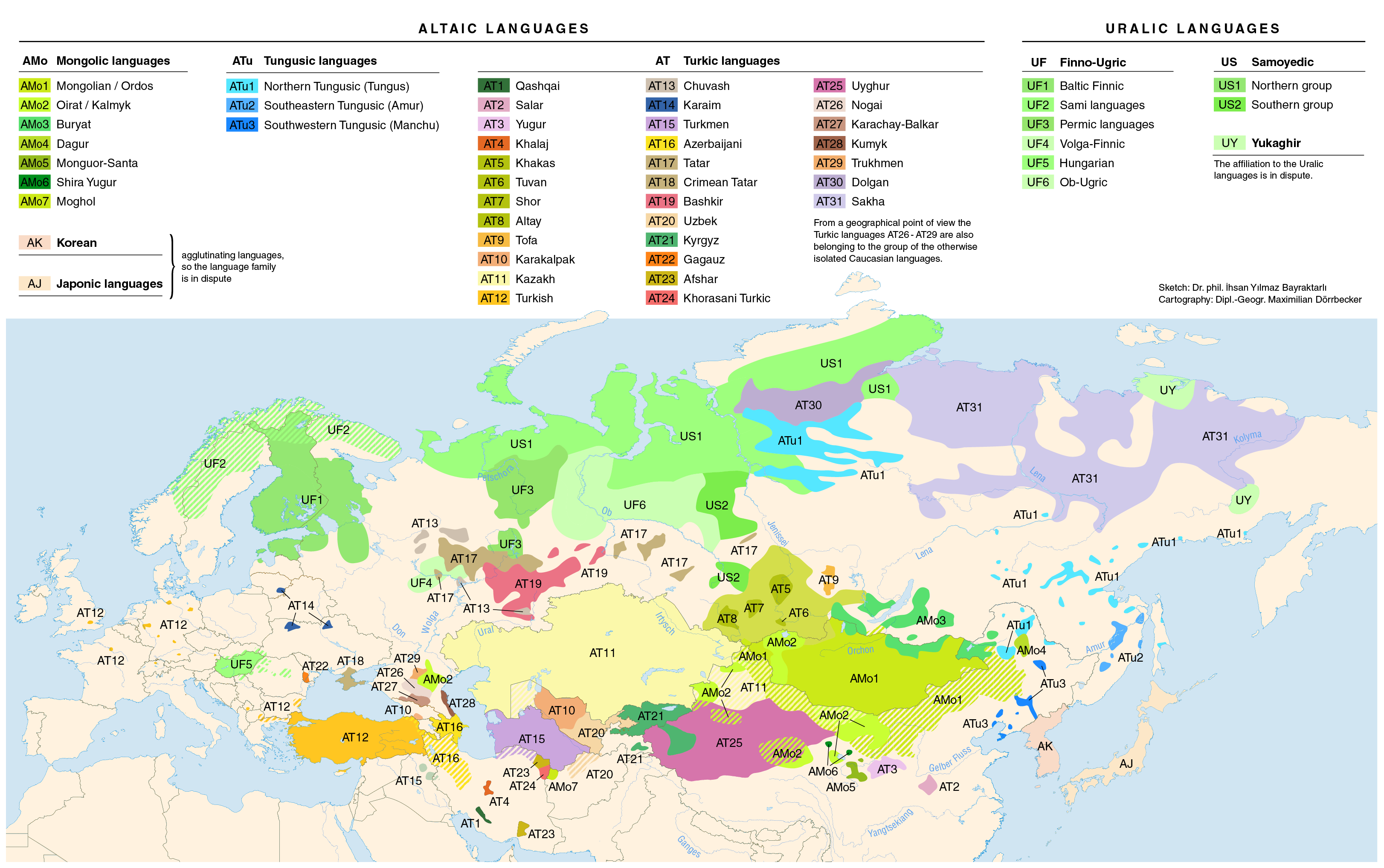
Altaic and Uralic languages spoken across Russia

The North Caucasus is ethno-linguistically diverse.

Russian is the official and the predominantly spoken language in Russia. It is the most spoken native language in Europe, the most geographically widespread language of Eurasia, as well as the world's most widely spoken Slavic language. Russian is the fifth-most used language on the Internet, and is one of two official languages aboard the International Space Station, as well as one of the six official languages of the United Nations.

Russia is a multilingual nation; approximately 100–150 minority languages are spoken across the country. According to the Russian Census of 2002, 142.6 million across the country spoke Russian, 5.3 million spoke Tatar, and 1.8 million spoke Ukrainian. The constitution allows the country's individual republics the right to establish their own state languages in addition to Russian, as well as guarantee its citizens the right to preserve their native language and to create conditions for its study and development. However, various experts have claimed Russia's linguistic diversity is rapidly declining.

== Religion ==
Religion in Russia (2024 estimate)
1. Russian Orthodoxy (61.8%)
2. Other Christian (2.60%)
3. Islam (9.50%)
4. Other religions (1.40%)
5. No religion (21.2%)
6. Undeclared (3.50%)

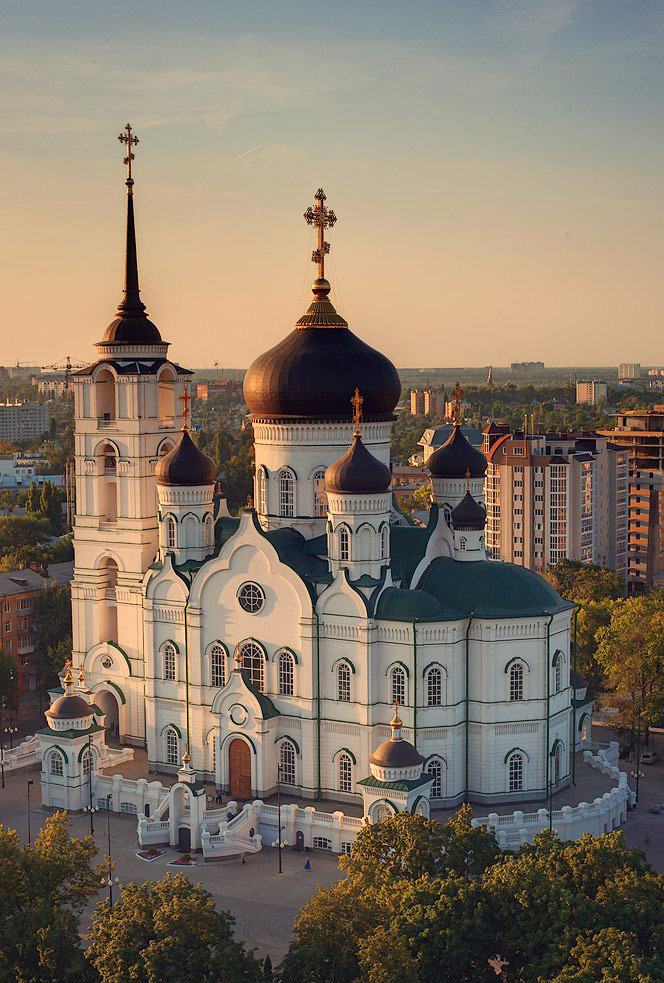
Annunciation Cathedral in Voronezh

Russia is a secular state by constitution, and its largest religion is Christianity. It has the world's largest Orthodox population. As of different sociological surveys on religious adherence, between 41% and over 80% of the total population of Russia adhere to the Russian Orthodox Church. Other branches of Christianity present in Russia include Catholicism (approx. 1%), Baptists, Pentecostals, Lutherans and other Protestant churches (together totalling about 0.5% of the population) and Old Believers. There is some presence of Judaism, Buddhism, and Hinduism; pagan beliefs are also present to some extent in remote areas, sometimes syncretized with one of the mainstream religions.

In 2017, a survey made by the Pew Research Center showed that 73% of Russians declared themselves as Christians—out of which 71% were Orthodox, 1% were Catholic, and 2% were Other Christians, while 15% were unaffiliated, 10% were Muslims, and 1% followed other religions. According to various reports, the proportion of Atheists in Russia is between 16% and 48% of the population.

Islam is the second-largest religion in Russia, and it is the traditional religion among most peoples of the North Caucasus, and among some Turkic peoples scattered along the Volga-Ural region. Buddhists have a sizable population in three Siberian republics: Buryatia, Tuva, and Zabaykalsky Krai, and in Kalmykia, the only region in Europe where Buddhism is the most practised religion.

== Education ==
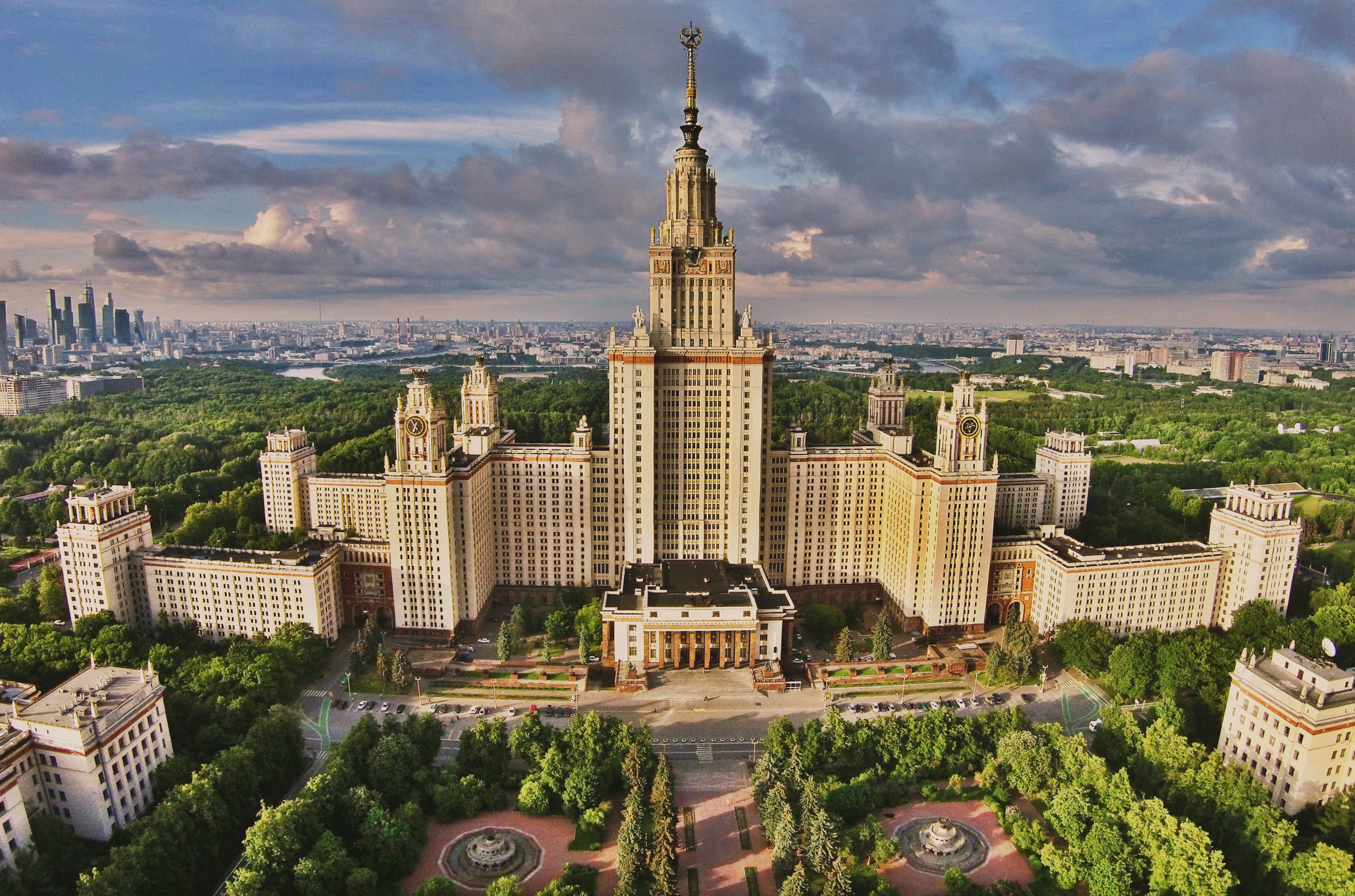
Moscow State University, the most prestigious educational institution in Russia.

Russia has an adult literacy rate of 100%. It grants free education to its citizens under its constitution. The Ministry of Education of Russia is responsible for primary and secondary education, as well as vocational education; while the Ministry of Education and Science of Russia is responsible for science and higher education. Regional authorities regulate education within their jurisdictions within the prevailing framework of federal laws. Russia is among the world's most educated countries, and has the third-highest proportion of tertiary-level graduates in terms of percentage of population, at 62%. It spent roughly 4.7% of its GDP on education in 2018.

Russia has compulsory education for a duration of 11 years, exclusively for children aged 7 to 17–18. Its pre-school education system is highly developed and optional, some four-fifths of children aged 3 to 6 attend day nurseries or kindergartens. Primary school is compulsory for 11 years, starting from age 6 to 7, and leads to a basic general education certificate. An additional two or three years of schooling are required for the secondary-level certificate, and some seven-eighths of Russians continue their education past this level. Admission to an institute of higher education is selective and highly competitive: first-degree courses usually take five years. The oldest and largest universities in Russia are Moscow State University and Saint Petersburg State University. There are ten highly prestigious federal universities across the country. Russia was the world's fifth-leading destination for international students in 2019, hosting roughly 300,000.

== Urbanized areas ==
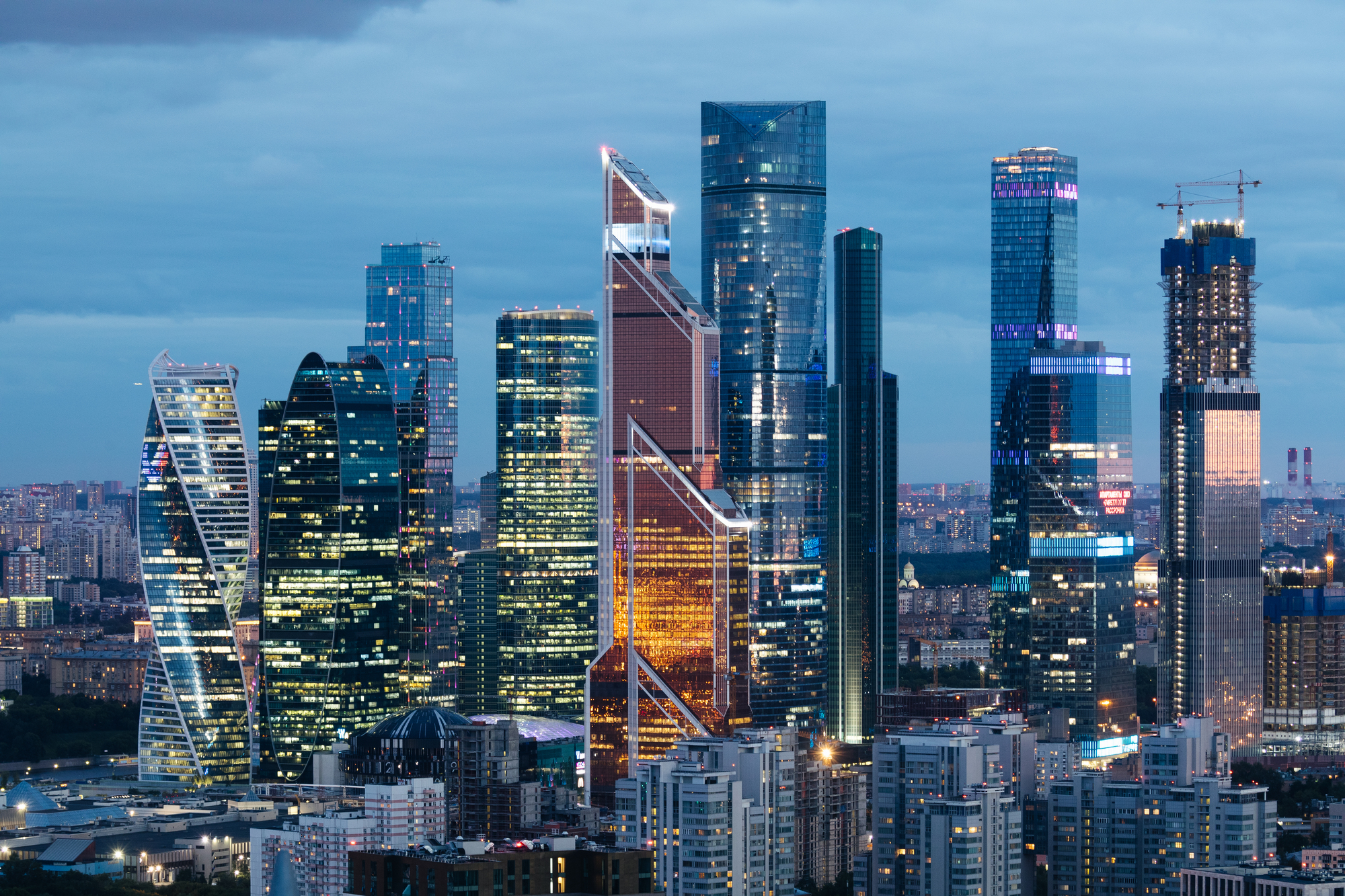
Moscow, the capital and largest city of Russia

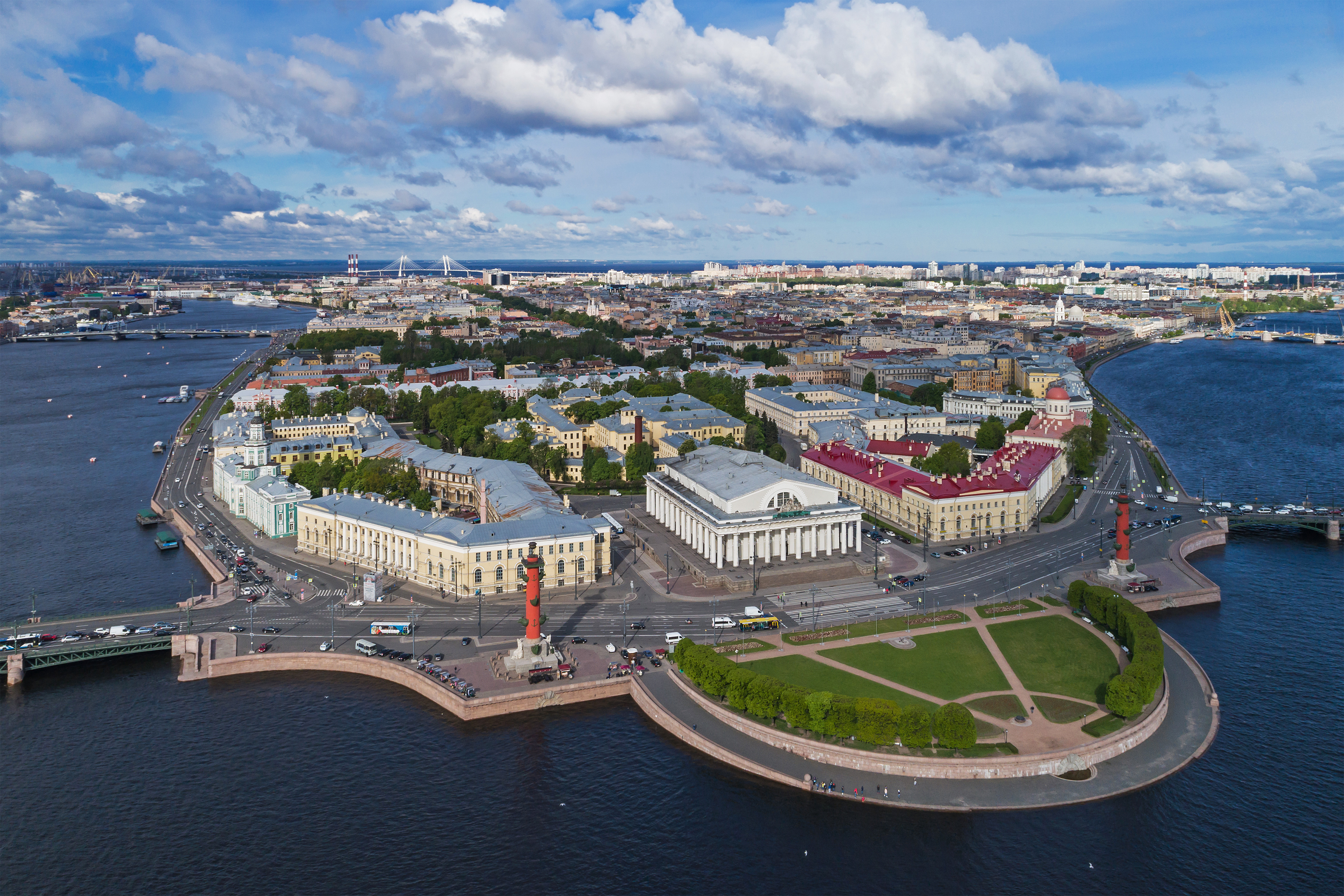
Saint Petersburg, the cultural capital and the second-largest city

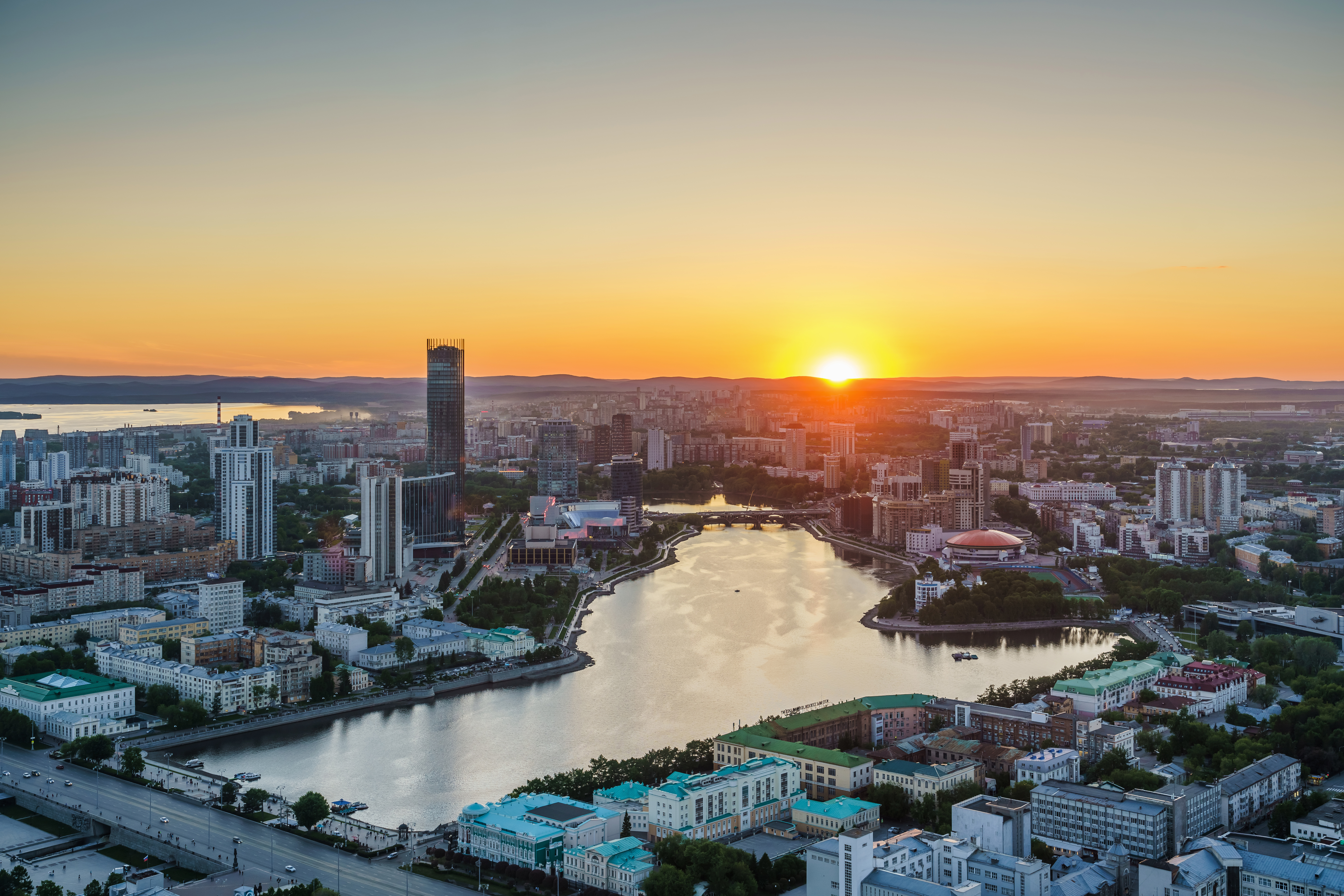
Yekaterinburg, the fourth-largest city in the country.

Russia is one of the world's most urbanized countries, with roughly 75% of its total population living in urban areas. Moscow, the capital and largest city, has a population estimated at 12.4 million residents within the city limits, while over 17 million residents in the urban area, and over 20 million residents in the metropolitan area. Moscow is among the world's largest cities, being the most populous city entirely within Europe, the most populous urban area in Europe, the most populous metropolitan area in Europe, and also the largest city by land area on the European continent. Saint Petersburg, the cultural capital, is the second-largest city, with a population of roughly 5.4 million inhabitants. Other major urban areas are Yekaterinburg, Novosibirsk, Kazan, Nizhny Novgorod, and Chelyabinsk.

Largest cities or towns in Russia 2025 estimate
Rank	Name	Federal subject	Pop.	Rank	Name	Federal subject	Pop.
1	Moscow	Moscow	13,274,285	11	Samara	Samara Oblast	1,154,223
2	Saint Petersburg	Saint Petersburg	5,652,922	12	Rostov-on-Don	Rostov Oblast	1,143,123
3	Novosibirsk	Novosibirsk Oblast	1,637,266	13	Omsk	Omsk Oblast	1,101,367
4	Yekaterinburg	Sverdlovsk Oblast	1,548,187	14	Voronezh	Voronezh Oblast	1,041,722
5	Kazan	Tatarstan	1,329,825	15	Perm	Perm Krai	1,027,518
6	Krasnoyarsk	Krasnoyarsk Krai	1,211,756	16	Volgograd	Volgograd Oblast	1,012,219
7	Nizhny Novgorod	Nizhny Novgorod Oblast	1,198,245	17	Saratov	Saratov Oblast	886,165
8	Chelyabinsk	Chelyabinsk Oblast	1,176,770	18	Tyumen	Tyumen Oblast	872,077
9	Ufa	Bashkortostan	1,166,098	19	Tolyatti	Samara Oblast	662,683
10	Krasnodar	Krasnodar Krai	1,154,885	20	Makhachkala	Dagestan	625,322

== See also ==
- Aging of Russia
- Demographic history of Russia
- Demographics of Siberia
- Demographics of Saint Petersburg
- List of federal subjects of Russia by total fertility rate
- List of federal subjects of Russia by life expectancy
- Genetic studies on Russians
- Health in Russia
- Indigenous small-numbered peoples of the North, Siberia and the Far East
- Russian cross
- Russian nationality law

Census information

- Soviet Census
- Russian Empire Census (1897)
- Russian Census (2002)
- Russian Census (2010)
- Russian Census (2021)
- List of cities and towns in Russia by population
