= Day of Conception =

Russian holiday

- Also called: Procreation Day
- Observed by: Russia
- Date: September 12
- Next time: 12 September 2025
- Frequency: annual

Day of Conception (also known as Procreation Day) is a Russian Holiday made popular by the region of Ulyanovsk, birthplace of Vladimir Lenin. The day itself takes place on September 12, and couples who then have a child on June 12 are rewarded by the regional government.

== History ==
In his 2006 State of the Nation address, Russian President Vladimir Putin called the demographic crisis the most urgent problem facing Russia and announced efforts to boost Russia's birth rate, including cash incentives to families that have more than one child.

In 2005, Gov. Sergey Ivanovich Morozov of Ulyanovsk, the region about 800 kilometres east of Moscow, added an element of fun to the national campaign by declaring September 12th the Day of Conception and giving couples time off from work to procreate and produce the next generation. The 2007 grand prize went to Irina and Andrei Kartuzov, who received a UAZ-Patriot, a sport utility vehicle made in Ulyanovsk. Other contestants won video cameras, TVs, refrigerators and washing machines. The event is designed to reduce what some Russian elements view as increasing sexlessness among young people in Russia.
