= The Insider (website) =

Online newspaper based in Riga, Latvia

- Investigations, Reports, Analytics
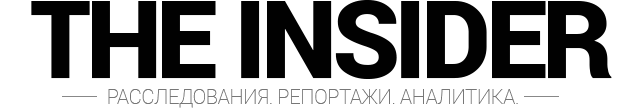
- Type: Online newspaper
- Owner: Roman Dobrokhotov
- Founder: Roman Dobrokhotov
- Editor-in-chief: Andris Jansons
- Editor: Michael Weiss
- Deputy editor: Timur Olevskiy
- Founded: 2013; 13 years ago
- Language: English, Russian
- Headquarters: Riga, Latvia
- Website: theins.ru/en (English) theins.ru (Russian)

The Insider is an online publication specializing in investigative journalism, fact-checking, and exposing fake news. It was founded by independent Russian journalist Roman Dobrokhotov. The publication operates websites in both Russian and English, along with a Telegram channel, an Instagram account, two TikTok accounts, and two YouTube channels: one for on-air programs and another for edited video content.

The Insider is published in both Russian and English. Roman Dobrokhotov, Christo Grozev, Sergei Kanev, Sergei Ezhov, Andrey Zayakin, and Dada Lyndell work for The Insider.

== History ==
Founded in November 2013 by Roman Dobrokhotov, a member of the Solidarnost movement and a liberal-democratic journalist and political activist, The Insider’s editorial office is based in Riga, Latvia.

Among its most notable successes, The Insider identified the FSB officers responsible for poisoning Russian opposition leader Alexei Navalny, Vladimir Kara-Murza, writer Dmitry Bykov, politician Nikita Isaev, and others.

The Insider was the first publication to link the hacker group Fancy Bear (APT28) to GRU Unit 26165 in 2016.

The Insider also identified the killer of Chechen refugee Zelimkhan Khangoshvili, who was assassinated in a Berlin park in 2019. Vadim Krasikov, an officer of the FSB spetsnaz unit Vympel, was confirmed as the hitman. The Insider also discovered the involvement of Vympel employees in other murders abroad.

The Insider managed to establish that one of the most wanted criminals in Europe, former Wirecard COO Jan Marsalek, is in hiding in Russia after receiving cover documents from the Russian security services.

The Insider also identified members of GRU Unit 29155, which is responsible for the poisoning of the Sergei and Yulia Skripals and the bombings of military depots in Bulgaria and the Czech Republic. A joint investigation by The Insider and CBS 60 Minutes tied these GRU officers to the “Havana Syndrome” phenomenon. According to the investigation, GRU officers attacked U.S. officials and intelligence officers using pulsed microwave radiation.

Other investigations by The Insider have resulted in over 20 companies being sanctioned by the EU and the US. Among these were firms that provided high-precision, Taiwanese-made machine tools to the Russian military-industrial complex, accounting for 45% of such illicit imports before the investigation.

On 23 July 2021, the Russian Ministry of Justice added “The Insider SIA,” the legal entity administering The Insider’s domain name, to its list of “foreign agents.” On April 15, 2022, Roman Dobrokhotov, the publication’s editor-in-chief, was also included on this list. Subsequently, on 15 July 2022, The Insider was declared an “undesirable” organization in Russia, leading to its website being blocked in the country.

== Investigations ==
=== Matilda 2017 film ===
In February 2017, The Insider reported that the financing of the Russian film Matilda was obtained through the Cypriot offshore company Tradescan Consultant. The receipt of the funds was formalized as a loan, but without an obligation to return. The journalists handed over the materials of their investigation on the financing scheme to the Russian State Duma deputy Natalia Poklonskaya, which she subsequently sent to the Investigative Committee with a request to initiate a criminal case on corruption.

=== Poisoning of Sergei and Yulia Skripal ===
In September 2018, in collaboration with the Bellingcat network and the BBC's Newsnight television program, The Insider conducted an investigation, publishing copies of official documents of the Federal Migration Service of Russia claiming to issue a passport in the name of Alexander Petrov, one of individuals accused of poisoning Sergei and Yulia Skripal in the United Kingdom, indicating his connection with the Russian intelligence agencies. The documents were provided by a source from the Russian police. Roman Dobrokhotov himself admitted that he did not know how the personal data of "Boshirov" and "Petrov" were obtained, stating that he himself "did not violate any laws", and that The Insider received information from Bellingcat. The Insider also discovered that the third participant in the poisoning of Skripal was associated with the poisoning of Bulgarian businessman Emilian Gebrev in 2015.

=== Assassination of Zelimkhan Khangoshvili ===
The Insider, together with Bellingcat and Der Spiegel, conducted an investigation and on 30 August 2019, stated that the murder of the former military commander Zelimkhan Khangoshvili in Berlin on August 23, 2019, was committed by a man working for the Russian intelligence agencies. The investigating group published materials in which they uncovered the real identity of the killer. They stated that the FSB Special Purpose Centre (FSB special unit Vympel) was preparing the repeat killer Vadim Krasikov for this murder, and also provided some details of Krasikov's movements in Europe.

=== Poisoning of Alexei Navalny ===
In 2017, Russia announced it had disposed of all available chemical weapons. In October 2020, following the poisoning of Alexei Navalny with chemical weapon Novichok, a joint investigation by The Insider, Bellingcat, Der Spiegel and Radio Liberty concluded that:

Not only did Russia did not [sic] destroy its chemical weapons, but it continues to develop it and produce for the needs of the special services — this is what we have found during our research that took more than a year to complete

They found out what scientists and government structures were involved in the development of the Novichok, their connection between each other and the alleged form in which the chemical weapon was used.

In December 2020, The Insider and Bellingcat in co-operation with CNN, Der Spiegel and Anti-Corruption Foundation published a joint investigation, in which they revealed details of what relationship the Russia's Federal Security Service (FSB) has to the poisoning of Navalny. According to the investigation, eight FSB officers with a chemical or/and medical background, who operated under the cover of the Institute of Forensic Science of the FSB (chief — Major General Vladimir Mikhailovich Bogdanov), tracked Navalny for 3 years and worked on an operation to poison him. The authors of the investigation named all the employees involved in the operation, as well as several of their pseudonyms. The investigation team used geolocation data, flight passenger records and telephone data to track and identify these agents.

=== Malaysia Airlines Flight 17 ===
In April 2020, The Insider, Bellingcat and BBC during the independent investigation identified one of the main persons involved in the Malaysian Boeing crash. The Insider said that they used voice-comparison technology, travel information and phone records to establish a person's identity. The outlet journalists contacted professor Catalin Grigoras of the National Center for Media Forensics at the University of Colorado Denver and asked him to conduct an analysis of audio recordings, as a result of which the likelihood ratio (LR) was 94.

In November 2020, The Insider and Bellingcat conducted a joint investigation into how the Main Directorate of the General Staff of the Armed Forces of the Russian Federation (GRU) coordinated the activities of the Bonanza Media media project, which spread fakes about the crash of a Malaysian Boeing in eastern Ukraine. The investigation team said that the head of the project was GRU Colonel Sergey Chebanov.

=== Poisoning of Vladimir Kara-Murza ===
In February 2021, a Bellingcat joint investigation with The Insider and Der Spiegel said that Vladimir Kara-Murza was followed by the same FSB unit that allegedly poisoned Alexei Navalny before he fell ill in 2015 and 2017.

=== 2022 Russian invasion of Ukraine ===
The Insider covered events during the Russian invasion of Ukraine in 2022. On 23 March 2022, its correspondent Oksana Baulina (Russian: Оксана Баулина) was killed by a Russian missile in Kyiv. Before her death, she made several reports from Lviv and Kyiv. Prior to joining The Insider, Baulina worked as a producer for the Anti-Corruption Foundation.

== Awards ==
On 10 November 2017, The Insider received the World Forum for Democracy Council of Europe Award for Innovation in Democracy with the following wording: "The Insider is an investigative newspaper that seeks to provide its readers with information about the current political, economic and social situation in Russia, while also promoting democratic values and shedding light on issues related to human rights and civil society. In addition, The Insider implements the 'Antifake' project, with the objective of systematically debunking fake news in Russian media, and to help its audience to distinguish relevant information from fake news and propaganda."

In May 2019, The Insider and Bellingcat received the European Press Prize for establishing the identity of the two men responsible for the poisoning of Sergei and Yulia Skripal.

In May 2019, The Insider's economic observer Boris Grozovski received Redkollegia award for his article "Calls to Fight Against Slavery Threatens the State System." How the market of "experts" works in the service of the SK" (Russian: «Призывы к борьбе с рабством угрожают государственному строю». Как устроен рынок «экспертов» на службе у СК).

In August 2019, The Insider received Free Media Awards for "Supporting Independent Journalism in Eastern Europe". This award is presented by two organisations — Zeit from Hamburg and the Fritt Ord foundation (Norway).

In February 2021, The Insider's article "Counter-sanctions. How FSB officers tried to poison Vladimir Kara-Murza" (Russian: Контрсанкции. Как сотрудники ФСБ пытались отравить Владимира Кара-Мурзу) received Redkollegia award.

== Persecution in Russia ==
On 23 July 2021 Russia's Ministry of Justice added The Insider to its list of "foreign mass media performing the functions of a foreign agent". On 14 December 2021 a court in Moscow ordered the outlet to pay 1 million rubles. On 15 July 2022, the publication was banned in Russia alongside Bellingcat. Following this restriction, any Russian citizen who aids Bellingcat or The Insider may face criminal prosecution; they would also be restricted from citing their publications. The office of the Prosecutor-General of Russia said that they were banned due to "posing a threat to the security of the Russian Federation".
