= Service for Citizenship and Registration of Foreign Citizens =

Russian law enforcement agency

Service for Citizenship and Registration of Foreign Citizens Служба по вопросам гражданства и регистрации иностранных граждан
- Emblem of the Service for Citizenship and Registration of Foreign Citizens
- Motto: Serving Russia, serving the law (Russian: Служим России — служим закону)

Agency overview
- Formed: 2 April 2025; 19 months ago
- Preceding agencies: Federal Migration Service (1992—2016); Main Directorate for Migration Affairs (2016—2025)

Jurisdictional structure
- Operations jurisdiction: Russia
- Area: 17,098,242 square kilometres (6,601,668 sq mi)
- Population: 143,441,534 (2016 est.)
- Legal jurisdiction: Russia
- Governing body: Ministry of Internal Affairs
- General nature: Civilian police

Operational structure
- Headquarters: Chistoprudnyy bulvar 12А-1, Moscow, Russia
- Agency executive: Andrei Kikot
- Parent agency: Ministry of Internal Affairs

Website
- en.mvd.ru/structure/Structure/services/migration-service

The Service for Citizenship and Registration of Foreign Citizens of the Ministry of Internal Affairs of the Russian Federation (Russian: Служба по вопросам гражданства и регистрации иностранных граждан Министерства внутренних дел Российской Федерации) is a law enforcement agency of the Ministry of Internal Affairs of Russia responsible for migration.

The organ is the authority for the enforcement of migration laws in Russia, drafting and implementing national policy, and providing government services with regard to migration. The service issues Russian international passports, Internal passports, resident registration and immigration control, and is charged with the investigation and enforcement of over 500 federal statutes within the Russian Federation.

== History ==
The creation of the Passport and Visa Service was closely linked to the population census in the USSR. According to the decree of the All-Russian Central Executive Committee of June 25, 1919, all citizens of the RSFSR who had reached the age of 16 were required to have a work record book with the characteristic slogan "He who does not work, neither shall he eat." The work record book indicated their place of work, as well as their residence registration.

After the end of War communism and the beginning of the New Economic Policy (NEP), passport and visa regulations were significantly liberalized. A decree of January 1922 granted all citizens the right to unimpeded movement throughout the RSFSR. On June 20, 1923, the decree of the All-Russian Central Executive Committee and the Council of People's Commissars of the RSFSR "On Identity Cards" introduced special temporary (3-year) identity cards, which were no longer mandatory, as of January 1, 1924. Passports, other residence permits, and work record books were cancelled.

On May 4, 1923, the NKVD of the RSFSR approved the regulation "On Address Bureaus and Address Desks in the RSFSR," which were established within city police departments to maintain population registration and records, as well as to issue address certificates.

In connection with the establishment of the Central Administrative Directorate (CAD) of the NKVD of the RSFSR on August 13 of that year, based on the Council of People's Commissars' Resolution of May 3, 1923, "On Simplifying the Structure and Reducing the Staffing of the People's Commissariats and Subordinate Bodies," by order of the Commissariat of August 31, 1923, which approved the regulations for the CAD, the organization of work on registering and monitoring the stay of Soviet and foreign citizens was assigned to the police department of the CAD of the NKVD of the RSFSR. The Council of People's Commissars of the RSFSR's Resolution of April 28, 1925, "On the Registration of Citizens in Urban Settlements", mandated that citizens register their residence registration in the house register at the appropriate police station within 48 hours of their arrival.

In July 1927, a new Decree "On Identity Cards", repealing the 1923 Decree, introduced a uniform identity card throughout the RSFSR. This card indicated the citizen's first name, last name, and patronymic, date and place of birth, address, occupation, military service status, presence of dependents, and the document on which the identity card was issued. Furthermore, the right to verify identity was extended to a number of other documents: birth certificates, house committee certificates, service passes, and military and student ID cards.

By the Decree of the Central Executive Committee and the Council of People's Commissars of the USSR of December 15, 1930, "On the Liquidation of the People's Commissars of Internal Affairs of the Union and Autonomous Republics", and the subsequent Decree of the Central Executive Committee and the Council of People's Commissars of the USSR of December 31 of the same year, "On Measures Arising from the Liquidation of the People's Commissariat of Internal Affairs of the RSFSR and the People's Commissars of Internal Affairs of the Autonomous Republics", the responsibility for granting Soviet citizenship and issuing foreign passports was entrusted to the presidiums of the executive committees of local Soviets of People's Deputies.

Due to industrialization, which led to the mass migration of the working-age population, on December 27, 1932, the Chairman of the USSR Central Executive Committee Mikhail Kalinin, the Chairman of the USSR Council of People's Commissars Vyacheslav Molotov, and the Secretary of the USSR Central Executive Committee Avel Yenukidze signed Resolution No. 57/1917 "On the Establishment of a Unified Passport System in the USSR and Mandatory Registration of Passports". All USSR citizens aged 16 and over who permanently resided in cities, workers' settlements, or worked in transportation and on state farms were required to have passports. Rural residents were not provided with passports (with the exception of those living within a ten-kilometer border zone).

Concurrently with this resolution, the Central Executive Committee and the Council of People's Commissars of the Soviet Union issued a resolution on December 27, 1932, "On the Formation of the Main Directorate of the Workers' and Peasants' Militia under the OGPU of the USSR". This body was created to provide general guidance to the workers' and peasants' militia departments of the union republics, as well as to introduce a unified passport system throughout the Soviet Union, register passports, and directly manage the country's passportization processes.

This day is considered the founding day of the Passport and Visa Service.

In accordance with Decree No. 928 of the President of the Russian Federation dated July 19, 2004, all law enforcement functions and functions related to monitoring, oversight, and provision of public services in the field of migration, assigned to the Passport and Visa Service of the Ministry of Internal Affairs of Russia, were transferred to the Federal Migration Service. The service was finally disbanded on January 1, 2006, with the formation of territorial offices of the Federal Migration Service.

The Main Directorate for Migration Affairs was established on 5 April 2016 when the Federal Migration Service was dissolved and its functions were transferred to the Ministry of Internal Affairs in accordance with Presidential Decree No. 156. On 2 April 2025, Main Directorate for Migration Affairs was reformed and replaced with Service for Citizenship and Registration of Foreign Citizens. A new senior position was created, First Deputy Minister of Internal Affairs – Head of the Service for Citizenship and Registration of Foreign Citizens. This arrangement places the head of the migration authority directly within the highest leadership of the Ministry.

== Organization ==
- Department for Citizenship Affairs (Russian: Отдел по вопросам гражданства)
- Department for Residence and Registration (Russian: Отдел по оформлению разрешений на проживание и регистрации по месту жительства/пребывания)
- Department for Foreign Nationals’ Legal Status (Russian: Отдел по вопросам правового положения иностранных граждан и лиц без гражданства)
- Labor Migration and Patents Department (Russian: Отдел трудовой миграции и оформления патентов)
- Inspection and Enforcement Division (Russian: Отдел контроля и надзора в сфере миграции)
- Legal Support and Regulatory Affairs Division (Russian: Отдел правового обеспечения)
- IT and Digital Services Department (Russian: Отдел информационных технологий и цифровых сервисов) which includes the Unified State Information System of Migration Registration (Russian: Единой государственной информационной системы миграционного учета)
- Public Reception and Complaints Department (Russian: Отдел по приему граждан и рассмотрению обращений)
- Regional and Local Migration Offices (Russian: Территориальные органы по вопросам миграции МВД России по субъектам Российской Федерации)

== Powers and duties ==
The Service for Citizenship and Registration of Foreign Citizens has varied powers in the field of migration and status in Russia. Among its duties are the following:

- Citizenship
  - Processing applications for Russian citizenship
  - Examining matters concerning acquisition and termination of Russian citizenship
  - Organizing procedures for determining whether a person possesses Russian citizenship
  - Issuing relevant documents within its competence
- Immigration and residence
  - Issuing temporary residence permits
  - Processing permanent residence permits
  - Administering procedures for foreign nationals entering and residing in Russia
  - Handling matters concerning the legal status of foreign nationals and stateless persons
- Migration registration
  - Registering foreign nationals at their place of stay
  - Administering migration records
  - Supervising compliance with migration registration requirements
- Labour migration
  - Administering work permits and patents
  - Regulating procedures for foreign workers
  - Supervising compliance with applicable labour migration requirements
- Migration control and enforcement
  - Identifying violations of migration legislation
  - Initiating administrative proceedings within its competence
  - Organizing procedures for administrative expulsion and deportation
  - Coordinating with other law-enforcement authorities

== See also ==
- Visa policy of Russia
- Immigration to Russia
- Illegal immigration to Russia
- Emigration from Russia
