= 2022 Russian invasion of Ukraine =

Campaign in ongoing war since 2014

- Part of the Russo-Ukrainian war
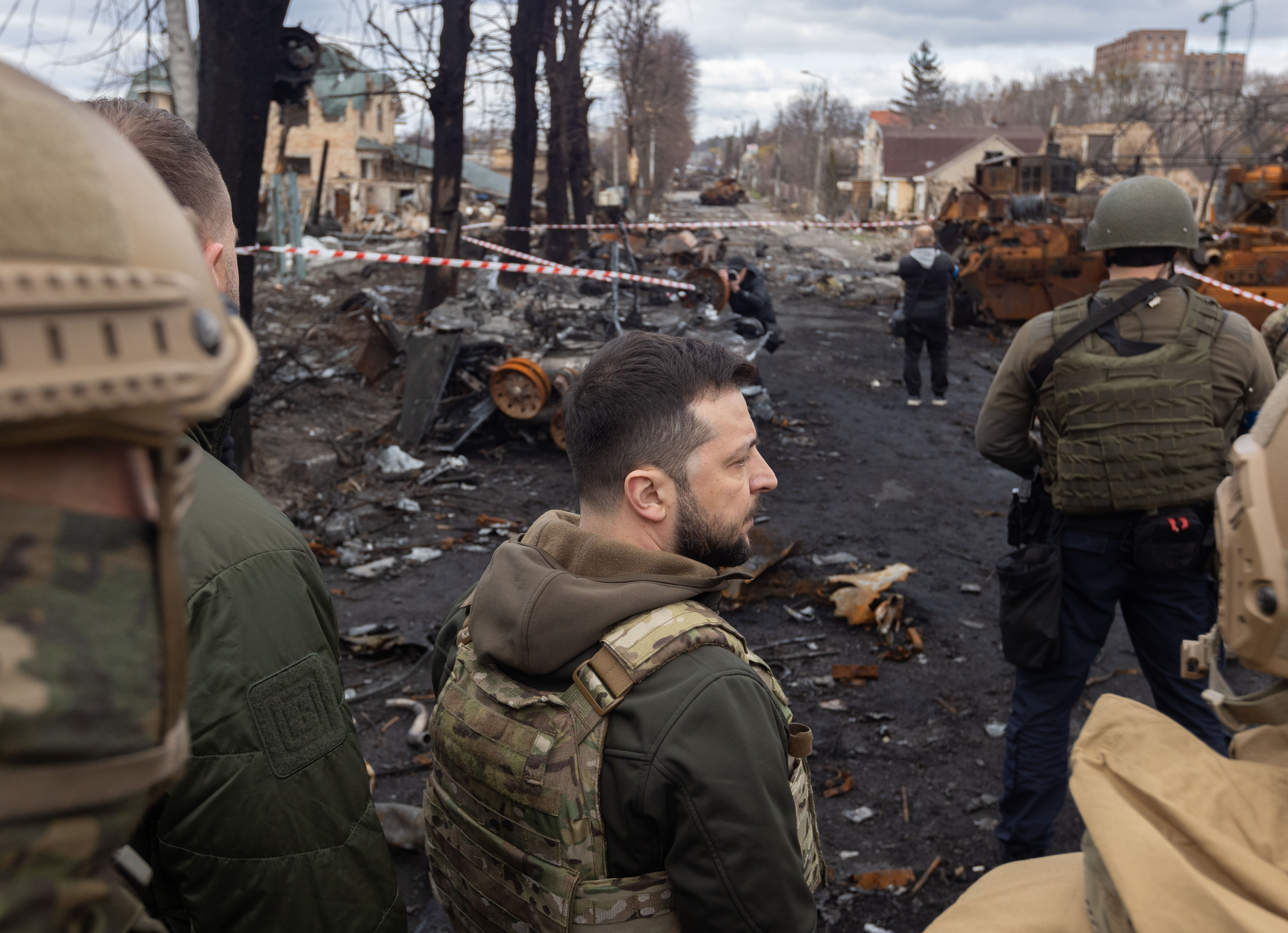
- Volodymyr Zelenskyy at the aftermath of the Bucha massacre, 4 April 2022
Date	24 February – 8 April 2022 (1 month, 2 weeks and 1 day)
Location	Ukraine
Result	Russian strategic failure

Belligerents
Russia; Belarus (Note: Belarus's logistical support for Russian forces, particularly allowing Russian forces to launch offensive operations against Ukraine from Belarusian territory in 2022, has been characterised as belligerency on the part of Belarus in this conflict by numerous analysts, including those published by the ISW, the IISS, and OSW.)	Ukraine (Note: See § Support for Ukraine for more details.)

Commanders and leaders
Vladimir Putin; Aleksandr Dvornikov; Aleksandr Lapin; Aleksandr Chaiko; Alexander Zhuravlyov	Volodymyr Zelenskyy; Valerii Zaluzhnyi; Oleksandr Syrskyi

Units involved
Order of battle	Order of battle

Strength
Pre-invasion at border: 150,000–200,000; Pre-invasion total: 900,000 military 554,000 paramilitary	Pre-invasion total: 196,600 military 102,000 paramilitary

Casualties and losses
- Reports vary widely; see Casualties for details.

On 24 February 2022, during the Russo-Ukrainian war, Russia launched a full-scale invasion of Ukraine, starting the current phase of the war, the largest conflict in Europe since World War II. By April 2022, the invasion's initial goal of a rapid Russian victory via decapitation had failed, with Ukraine pushing back the northern arm of the invasion and preventing the capture of Kyiv. Following this, the war transitioned to more conventional fighting in the south and east of Ukraine.

In a televised address, Russian president Vladimir Putin announced the invasion, calling it a "special military operation". He said that its purpose was to support the Russian-backed breakaway republics of Donetsk and Luhansk, whose paramilitary forces had been fighting Ukraine in the war in Donbas since 2014. Putin espoused irredentist and imperialist views challenging Ukraine's legitimacy as a state, baselessly claimed that the Ukrainian government were neo-Nazis committing genocide against the Russian minority in the Donbas, and said that Russia's goal was to "demilitarise and denazify" Ukraine.

In late 2021, Russia massed troops near Ukraine's borders and issued demands to the West including a ban on Ukraine ever joining the NATO military alliance. After repeatedly denying having plans to attack Ukraine, on 24 February 2022, Russian air strikes and a ground invasion were launched on a northern front from Belarus towards the capital Kyiv, a southern front from Crimea, and an eastern front from the Donbas and towards Kharkiv. Ukraine enacted martial law, ordered a general mobilisation, and severed diplomatic relations with Russia.

Russia's invasion plan involved defeating Ukraine within ten days and capturing or killing its government, followed by "mopping up" operations, establishing filtration camps for Ukrainians, setting up occupation regimes, trying and executing people involved in the Revolution of Dignity, and annexation. Whilst the invasion failed its main goal of a rapid victory, as Ukraine pushed back the northern arm of the invasion and prevented the capture of Kyiv, Russia maintained a military occupation of the southeast of Ukraine, and several months after the invasion, unilaterally declared the annexation of four Ukrainian oblasts.

The invasion was met with widespread international condemnation. The United Nations General Assembly passed a resolution condemning the invasion and demanding a full Russian withdrawal. The International Court of Justice ordered Russia to halt military operations, and the Council of Europe expelled Russia. Many countries imposed sanctions on Russia and its ally Belarus and provided humanitarian and military aid to Ukraine. The Baltic states and Poland declared Russia a terrorist state. Protests occurred around the world, with anti-war protesters in Russia being met by mass arrests and greater media censorship. The International Criminal Court (ICC) opened an investigation into crimes against humanity, war crimes, abduction of Ukrainian children, and genocide against Ukrainians. The ICC issued arrest warrants for Putin and other Russian officials.

== Background ==
Ukraine, with the annexed Crimea in the south and two Russia-backed separatist republics in Donbas in the east up to the 2022 invasion

In 2013, Ukraine's parliament overwhelmingly approved finalising an association agreement with the European Union (EU), which had been negotiated for several years. Russia put pressure on Ukraine to reject the agreement and imposed economic sanctions on the country. Kremlin adviser Sergei Glazyev warned in September 2013 that if Ukraine signed the EU agreement, Russia would no longer acknowledge Ukraine's borders.

In November, Ukrainian president Viktor Yanukovych suddenly withdrew from signing the agreement, choosing closer ties to the Russian-led Eurasian Economic Union instead. This coerced withdrawal triggered a wave of protests known as Euromaidan, culminating in the Revolution of Dignity in February 2014. Almost 100 protesters were killed. Despite signing an agreement, Yanukovych fled. Parliament voted to remove him and he ended up in Russia.

Russian soldiers with no insignia occupied the Ukrainian territory of Crimea, and seized the Crimean Parliament. Russia annexed Crimea in March 2014, after a widely disputed referendum held under occupation. Pro-Russian protests immediately followed in the Ukrainian cities of Donetsk and Luhansk. The war in Donbas began in April 2014 when armed Russian mercenaries led by Igor 'Strelkov' Girkin seized Sloviansk and nearby towns. Russian troops were covertly involved in the fighting. The Minsk agreements, signed in September 2014 and February 2015, aimed to resolve the conflict, but ceasefires and further negotiations repeatedly failed.

== Prelude ==
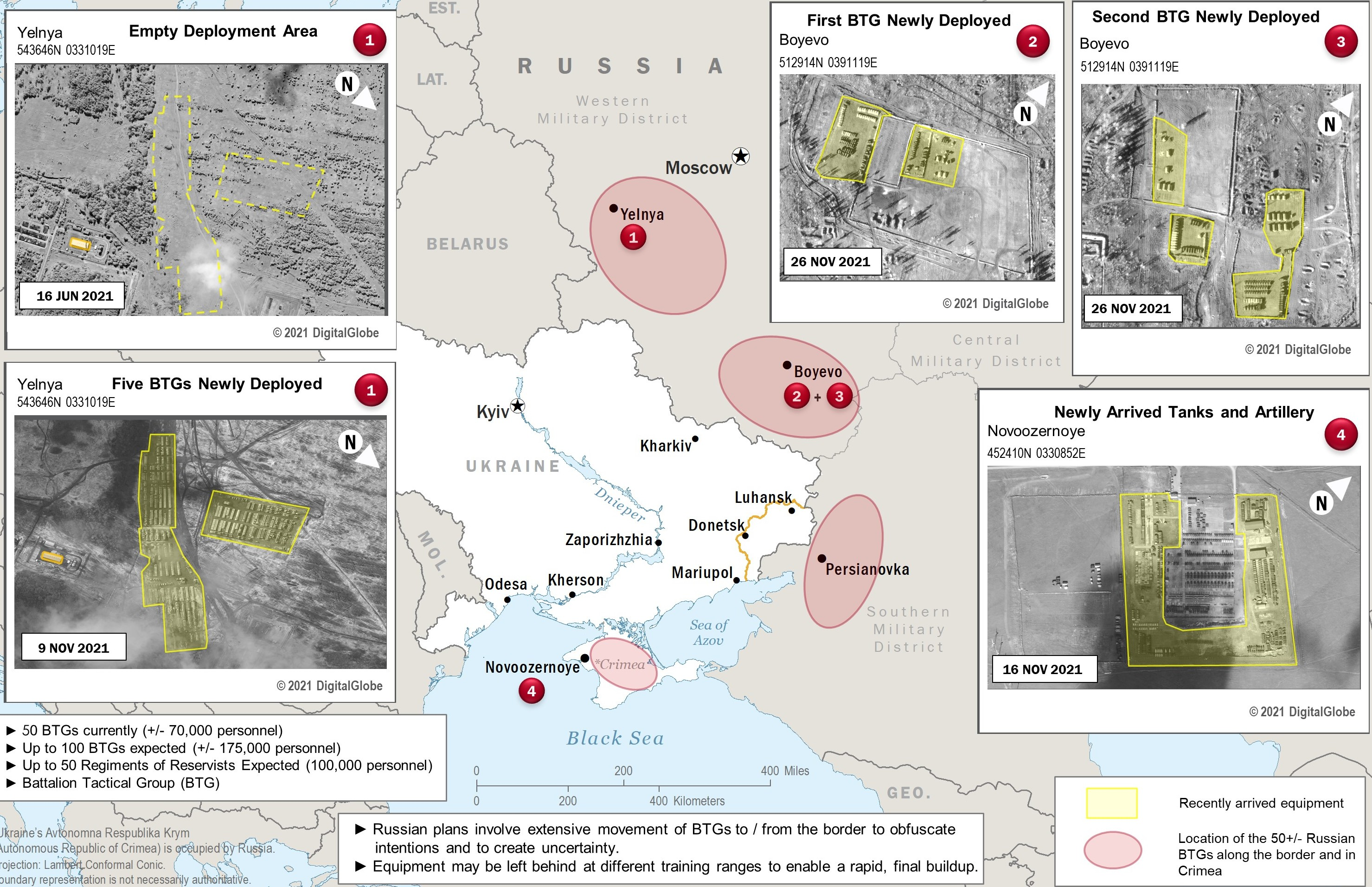
Russian military build-up around Ukraine as of 3 December 2021

=== Russian military buildup and demands ===
There was a large Russian military build-up near Ukraine's borders in March and April 2021, and again in both Russia and Belarus from October 2021 onward. Members of the Russian government, including Putin, denied having plans to attack or invade Ukraine up until the day before the invasion.

While Russian troops massed on Ukraine's borders, Russia's proxy forces launched thousands of attacks on Ukrainian forces in the Donbas. Observers from the Organization for Security and Co-operation in Europe (OSCE), which also includes Ukraine and Russia, reported more than 90,000 ceasefire violations throughout 2021; the vast majority in Russian-controlled territory.

In July 2021, Putin published an essay "On the Historical Unity of Russians and Ukrainians", in which he called Ukraine "historically Russian lands" and claimed there is "no historical basis" for the "idea of Ukrainian people as a nation separate from the Russians". Putin was accused of promoting Russian imperialism, historical revisionism and disinformation. Writing in 2024, Michael McFaul and Robert Person described this essay as representing not only "cynical propaganda" but also Putin's "deeply held and internalized beliefs".

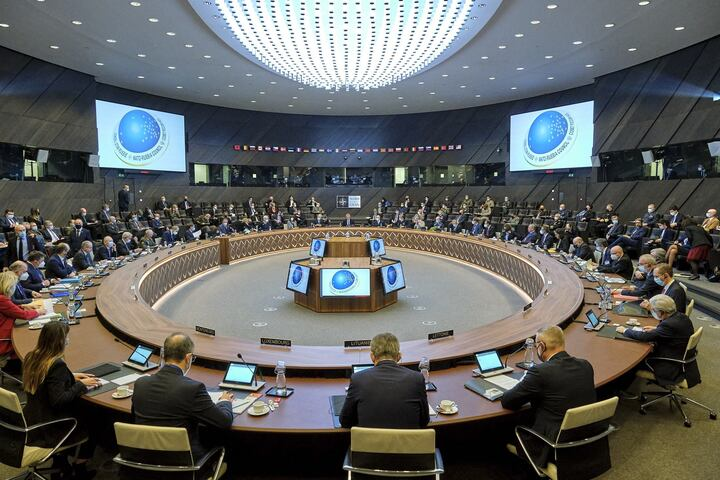
Meeting of the NATO-Russia Council on 12 January 2022

In December 2021, Russia issued an ultimatum to the West, which included demands that NATO end all activity in its Eastern European member states and ban Ukraine or any other former Soviet state from ever joining the alliance. Russia's government said NATO was a threat and warned of a military response if it followed an "aggressive line". NATO Secretary General Jens Stoltenberg replied that "Russia has no veto" on whether Ukraine joins, and "has no right to establish a sphere of influence to try to control their neighbours".

Several Western political analysts suggested Russia knew that its "unrealistic demands" would be rejected, which would give it a pretext to invade. Political scientists Michael McFaul and Robert Person said Russia's occupation of Crimea and the Donbas since 2014 had already blocked Ukraine's NATO membership, suggesting that Putin's real aim was to subjugate Ukraine.

NATO offered to negotiate some of Russia's demands and to improve military transparency, as long as Russia stopped its troop buildup. The alliance rejected Russia's demand to keep Ukraine out of NATO forever, pointing out that Russia had signed agreements affirming the right of Ukraine and other countries to join alliances. The US proposed that itself and Russia sign an agreement not to station missiles or troops in Ukraine. Putin replied that Russia's demands had been "ignored", and the Russian troop buildup continued.

Western leaders vowed that heavy sanctions would be imposed should Putin choose to invade rather than to negotiate. French president Emmanuel Macron and German Chancellor Olaf Scholz met Putin in February 2022 to dissuade him from invading. According to Scholz, Putin told him that Ukraine should not be an independent state. Scholz told Ukrainian president Volodymyr Zelenskyy to declare Ukraine a neutral country and renounce its aspirations to join NATO. Zelenskyy said Putin had broken agreements and could not be trusted to respect Ukrainian neutrality. Ukraine had been a neutral country in 2014 when Russia occupied Crimea and invaded the Donbas.

On 19 February, Zelenskyy made a speech at the Munich Security Conference, calling for Western powers to end their "appeasement" of Putin and give a timeframe for when Ukraine could join NATO. Political analysts Taras Kuzio and Vladimir Socor agree that "when Russia made its decision to invade Ukraine, that country was more remote than ever not only from NATO membership but from any track that might lead to membership".

=== Escalation (February 2022) ===
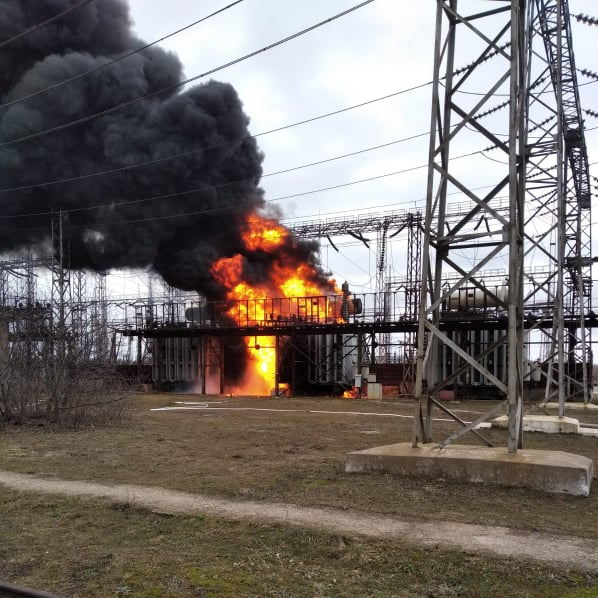
Luhansk power station after being shelled by Russian-backed forces in the Donbas, 22 February 2022

Fighting in Donbas escalated from 17 February 2022. The Ukrainians and the Russian separatists accused one another of firing into their respective territories. On 18 February, the Donetsk and Luhansk people's republics ordered all civilians to leave their capitals, although observers noted that full evacuations would take months. Ukrainian media reported a sharp increase in artillery shelling by the Russian-led militants in Donbas as an attempt to provoke the Ukrainian army. Separatist leaders warned that Ukraine was about to launch an offensive, but they gave no evidence, and The Guardian noted it would be "exceedingly risky" for Ukraine to assault the Donbas while Russian troops were massed on its borders. Zelenskyy said his military would not respond to the provocations.

In the days leading up to the invasion, the Russian government intensified its disinformation campaign. Ukraine and Western leaders accused Russia of staging false flag attacks to give Russia a pretext for invading. Russian state media aired fabricated videos that purported to show Ukrainian forces attacking Russians in Donbas; evidence showed that the claimed attacks, explosions, and evacuations were staged by Russia. On 17 February, Russian proxy forces shelled a kindergarten and blamed it on Ukraine, although the kindetgarten was in Ukrainian-held territory. On 21 February, the head of the Russian Federal Security Service (FSB) said that Russian forces had killed five Ukrainian "saboteurs" that crossed into Russian territory, capturing one Ukrainian serviceman and destroying two armoured vehicles. The claim was denied by Ukraine and drew warnings that Russia was seeking further justification to start an invasion. The Sunday Times described it as "the first move in Putin's war plan."

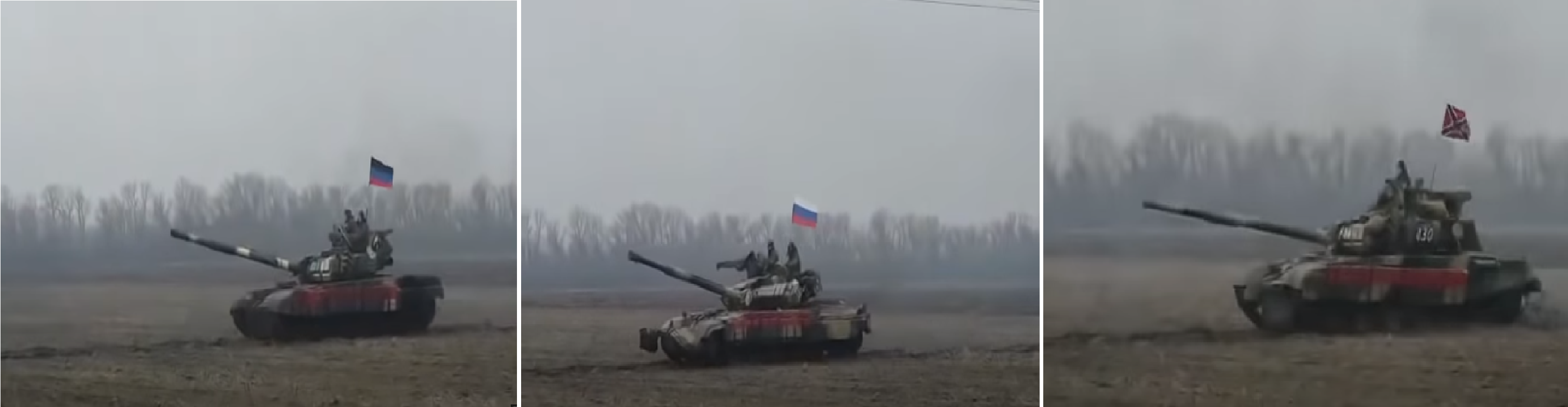
Tanks of Russian and Russian proxy forces in the Donbas, 23 February 2022

On 21 February, Putin announced that the Russian government would recognise the Donetsk and Luhansk people's republics. The same evening, Putin directed that Russian troops be deployed to the Donbas, in what he called a "peacekeeping mission". In the same speech, Putin questioned the validity of the Ukrainian nation, stating that "Modern Ukraine was entirely created by Russia", views which Michael McFaul and Robert Person, writing in 2024, described as "grotesque". The 21 February intervention in Donbas was condemned by several members of the UN Security Council; none voiced support. On 22 February, video footage shot in the early morning showed Russian armed forces and tanks moving in the Donbas region. The Federation Council unanimously authorised the use of military force outside Russia.

In response, Zelenskyy ordered the conscription of army reservists. The following day, Ukraine's parliament proclaimed a 30-day nationwide state of emergency and ordered the mobilisation of all reservists. Russia began to evacuate its embassy in Kyiv. The websites of the Ukrainian parliament and government, along with banking websites, were hit by DDoS attacks, widely attributed to Russian-backed hackers. On the night of 23 February, Zelenskyy gave a speech in Russian in which he appealed to the citizens of Russia to prevent war. He also refuted Russia's claims about the presence of neo-Nazis in the Ukrainian government and said that he had no intention of attacking the Donbas region. Kremlin spokesman Dmitry Peskov said on 23 February that the separatist leaders in Donetsk and Luhansk had sent a letter to Putin stating that Ukrainian shelling had caused civilian deaths and appealing for Russian military support.

In response, Ukraine requested an urgent UN Security Council meeting. Half an hour into the emergency meeting, Putin announced the start of military operations in Ukraine. Sergiy Kyslytsya, the Ukrainian representative, subsequently called on the Russian representative, Vasily Nebenzya, to "do everything possible to stop the war" or relinquish his position as president of the UN Security Council; Nebenzya refused.

=== Invasion plans ===
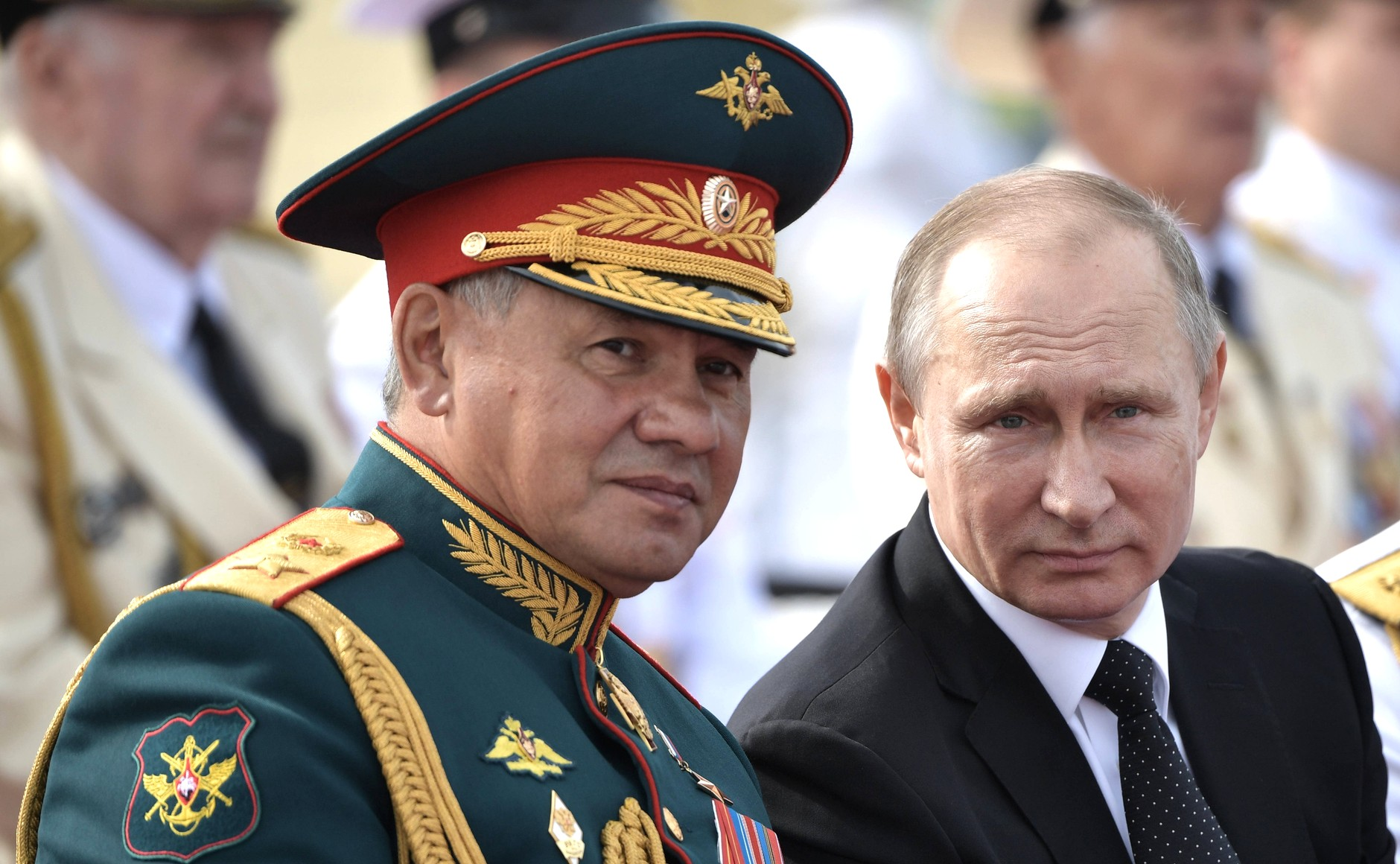
Putin and his long-time confidant Defence Minister Sergei Shoigu

The Royal United Services Institute reported that Russia's plan involved defeating Ukraine within ten days and capturing or killing its government, followed by "mopping up" operations; establishing filtration camps for Ukrainians; setting up occupation regimes; executing people involved in the Revolution of Dignity; and lastly annexation. The decision to invade was reportedly made by Putin and a small group of war hawks or siloviki in Putin's inner circle, including national security adviser Nikolai Patrushev and defence minister Sergei Shoigu.

After the start of the invasion, Ukrainian and Western analysts assessed that Putin seemed to have believed that the Russian Armed Forces would be capable of seizing Kyiv within days. This assessment led to the conclusion that "taking Kyiv in three days" had been the original goal of the invasion. The narrative of the planned "three day" capture of Kyiv was reinforced by statements by Aleksandr Lukashenko and Margarita Simonyan, editor-in-chief of Russian state-controlled broadcaster RT. On 2 March, the Security Service of Ukraine (SBU) repeated the claim following its release of a video showing a captured Russian soldier claiming that his unit was sent into Ukraine with food supplies for only three days. Documents found inside Russian tanks mention how the "special military operation" would conclude in ten days. Ukraine also captured "flagship" tanks – as used in parades – along with military parade uniforms, suggesting that Russia expected to stage a victory parade in Kyiv after a swift conquest.

Putin himself asserted back in 2014 that Russian forces "could take Ukraine in two weeks". Three days after the invasion began, RIA Novosti, a Russian state news agency, mistakenly published an article called "Russia's Coming and the New World", which had been made in advance in anticipation of a Russian victory; it announced that "Ukraine had returned to Russia". Zelenskyy also said that Russia had sent him an ultimatum to step down and be replaced with Viktor Medvedchuk.

=== Putin's invasion announcement ===
Before 5 a.m. Kyiv time on 24 February, Putin, in another speech, announced a "special military operation", which effectively declared war on Ukraine. Putin said the operation was to "protect the people" of the Russian-controlled breakaway republics. He baselessly claimed that Russians in the Donbas had "been facing humiliation and genocide perpetrated by the Kyiv regime", that Ukrainian government officials were neo-Nazis under Western control, that Ukraine was developing nuclear weapons, and that a hostile NATO was building up its forces and military infrastructure in Ukraine. He said Russia sought the "demilitarisation and denazification" of Ukraine, and denied the legitimacy of the Ukrainian state. Putin said he had no plans to occupy Ukraine. The invasion began within minutes of Putin's speech.

In order to justify the invasion of Ukraine within the context of international norms, Putin cited the 1999 NATO bombing of Yugoslavia and 2003 US invasion of Iraq.

== Opposing forces ==
=== Russia ===
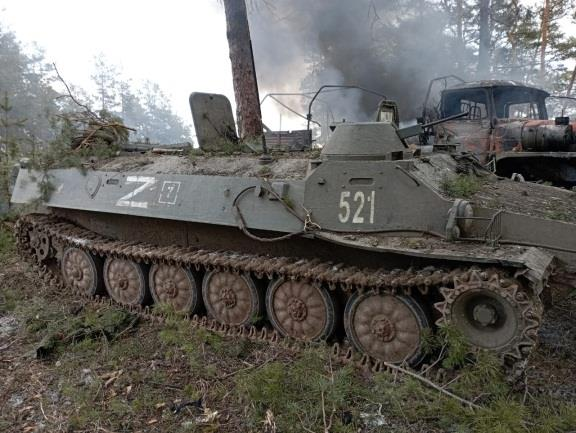
A Russian MT-LB marked with the "Z" tactical symbol, captured by Ukrainian forces in Luhansk

Russian regular forces involved in the invasion comprised nearly 150,000 troops, organised in about 140 Battalion Tactical Groups. The forces of the Russia-controlled LNR and DNR, and paramilitary forces engaged in the invasion, raised total Russian-controlled forces employed in the campaign to as many as 200,000.

These forces were organised into groups having tactical signs to distinguish them, and were to advance into Ukraine along at least ten different axes of advance. Rather than having a unified command-structure, these groups were organised under different Russian military-district command-posts named after the region of Russia in which their respective military-district was located. Two groups commanded by the Eastern Military District under Aleksandr Chaiko were to advance on Kyiv, one group with the tactical sign "V" that was to advance on Kyiv from Belarus (i.e., from the west), and one with the tactical sign "O" (known as the Central Group of Forces, under Central Military District commander Aleksandr Lapin) to advance on Kyiv from the Bryansk region (i.e., from the east), with the goal of surrounding the capital between them. Three groups, all having the tactical sign "Z" and commanded by the Western Military District under Alexander Zhuravlyov, were to advance into Ukraine respectively from Kursk, Belgorod and Voronezh. Groups under the Southern Military District under Aleksandr Dvornikov were identified with a "Z in a square" tactical symbol, and, advancing from occupied Crimea, were tasked with surrounding Mariupol, capturing Zaporizhia, seizing Kherson, and crossing the Dnieper river to take Voznesensk.

Russian regular forces involved in the invasion were equipped with roughly 2,800 tanks ready for combat, with another 400 approximately in the hands of the Russian-controlled proxy forces of the LNR and DNR.

=== Ukraine ===
Ukrainian forces at the outbreak of the war comprised roughly 20 combat-ready brigades, of which more than half were located in the east of the country, positioned along the line of contact in the "Joint Forces Operation" zone in Donbas. An additional manoeuvre brigade and two brigades of artillery were located in the Kyiv region, with other forces also deployed in the area of Kharkiv, Dnipro, Sumy, and Odesa. No major combat units were located on the Gomel or Crimean axes.

Ukrainian tank-forces had roughly 900 battle-ready tanks organised in some 30 battalions at the time of the invasion. Most of these tank battalions were formed in the period 2014–2018, when roughly 500 tanks were delivered to the Ukrainian armed forces, mostly reconditioned older tanks rather than new-built tanks, particularly T-64B and T-64-BM tanks. The tank battalions were spread between Ukraine's two regular and four reserve armoured brigades, as well as tank units attached to brigades of mechanised, mountain, airborne and marine infantry. In contrast to the direct-fire techniques practised in most armoured forces, Ukrainian forces had, based on their experience during the war in Donbas, developed a technique of using tanks in the indirect-fire role. This meant Ukrainian tank forces acting essentially as mobile artillery that did not require the kind of screening that traditional artillery units require.

== Events ==
The invasion began at dawn on 24 February. Fighting began in Luhansk Oblast at 3:40 a.m. Kyiv time near Milove on the border with Russia. The main infantry and tank attacks were launched in four spearheads, creating a northern front launched towards Kyiv from Belarus, a southern front from Crimea, a southeastern front from Russian-controlled Donbas, and an eastern front from Russia towards Kharkiv and Sumy. Russian vehicles were subsequently marked with a white Z military symbol (a non-Cyrillic letter), believed to be a measure to prevent friendly fire.

Immediately after the invasion began, Zelenskyy declared martial law in Ukraine in a first video speech. The same evening, he ordered a general mobilisation of all Ukrainian males between 18 and 60 years old, prohibiting them from leaving the country. Wagner Group mercenaries and Kadyrovites contracted by the Kremlin reportedly made several attempts to assassinate Zelenskyy, including an operation involving several hundred mercenaries meant to infiltrate Kyiv with the aim of killing the Ukrainian president. The Ukrainian government said anti-war officials within Russia's FSB shared the plans with them. Zelenskyy appeared defiant in video messages on 24 through 26 February, that he and his cabinet is still in Kyiv. On 26 February NATO met and its countries pledged military aid for Ukraine and on 27 February Germany called the invasion a historic watershed. That day in the evening Putin put Russia's nuclear deterrence into alert.

The Russian invasion was unexpectedly met by fierce Ukrainian resistance. In Kyiv, Russia failed to take the city and was repulsed in the battles of Irpin, Hostomel, and Bucha. The Russians tried to encircle the capital, but its defenders under Oleksandr Syrskyi held their ground, effectively using Western Javelin anti-tank missiles and Stinger anti-aircraft missiles to thin Russian supply lines and stall the offensive.

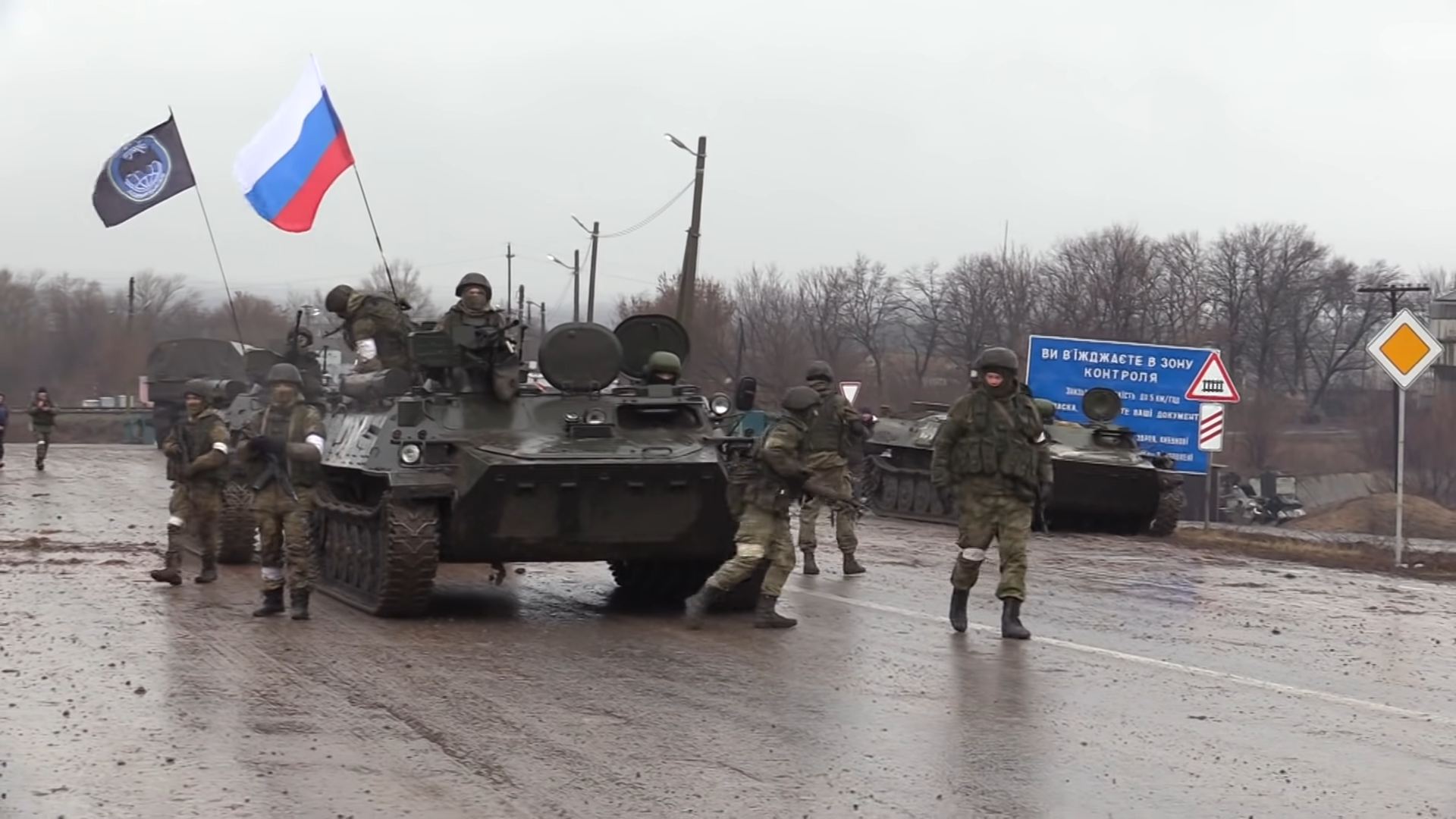
Russian troops in Novoaidar. The settlement was captured on 3 March 2022.

On the southern front, Russian forces had captured the regional capital of Kherson by 2 March. A column of Russian tanks and armoured vehicles was ambushed on 9 March outside of Brovary and sustained heavy losses that forced them to retreat. The Russian army adopted siege tactics on the western front around the key cities of Chernihiv, Sumy and Kharkiv, but failed to capture them due to stiff resistance and logistical setbacks. In Mykolaiv Oblast, Russian forces advanced as far as Voznesensk, but were repelled and pushed back south of Mykolaiv. On 25 March, the Russian Defence Ministry stated that the first stage of the "military operation" in Ukraine was "generally complete", that the Ukrainian military forces had suffered serious losses, and the Russian military would now concentrate on the "liberation of Donbas." The "first stage" of the invasion was conducted on four fronts, including one towards western Kyiv from Belarus by the Russian Eastern Military District, comprising the 29th, 35th, and 36th Combined Arms Armies. A second axis, deployed towards eastern Kyiv from Russia by the Central Military District (northeastern front), comprised the 41st Combined Arms Army and the 2nd Guards Combined Arms Army.

A third axis was deployed towards Kharkiv by the Western Military District (eastern front), with the 1st Guards Tank Army and 20th Combined Arms Army. A fourth, southern front originating in occupied Crimea and Russia's Rostov oblast with an eastern axis towards Odesa and a western area of operations toward Mariupol was opened by the Southern Military District, including the 58th, 49th, and 8th Combined Arms Army, the latter also commanding the 1st and 2nd Army Corps of the Russian separatist forces in Donbas. By 7 April, Russian troops deployed to the northern front by the Russian Eastern Military District pulled back from the Kyiv offensive, reportedly to resupply and redeploy to the Donbas region in an effort to reinforce the renewed invasion of southeastern Ukraine. The northeastern front, including the Central Military District, was similarly withdrawn for resupply and redeployment to southeastern Ukraine.

=== Kyiv and northern front ===
Military control around Kyiv on 2 April 2022

Russian efforts to capture Kyiv included a probative spearhead on 24 February, from Belarus south along the west bank of the Dnipro River. The apparent intent was to encircle the city from the west, supported by two separate axes of attack from Russia along the east bank of the Dnipro: the western at Chernihiv, and from the east at Sumy. These were likely intended to encircle Kyiv from the northeast and east.

Russia tried to seize Kyiv quickly, with Spetsnaz infiltrating into the city supported by airborne operations and a rapid mechanised advance from the north, but failed. The United States contacted Zelenskyy and offered to help him flee the country, lest the Russian Army attempt to kidnap or kill him on seizing Kyiv; Zelenskyy responded that "The fight is here; I need ammunition, not a ride." The Washington Post, which described the quote as "one of the most-cited lines of the Russian invasion", was not entirely sure of the comment's accuracy. Reporter Glenn Kessler said it came from "a single source, but on the surface it appears to be a good one". Russian forces advancing on Kyiv from Belarus gained control of the ghost town of Chernobyl. Russian Airborne Forces attempted to seize two key airfields near Kyiv, launching an airborne assault on Antonov Airport, and a similar landing at Vasylkiv, near Vasylkiv Air Base, on 26 February.

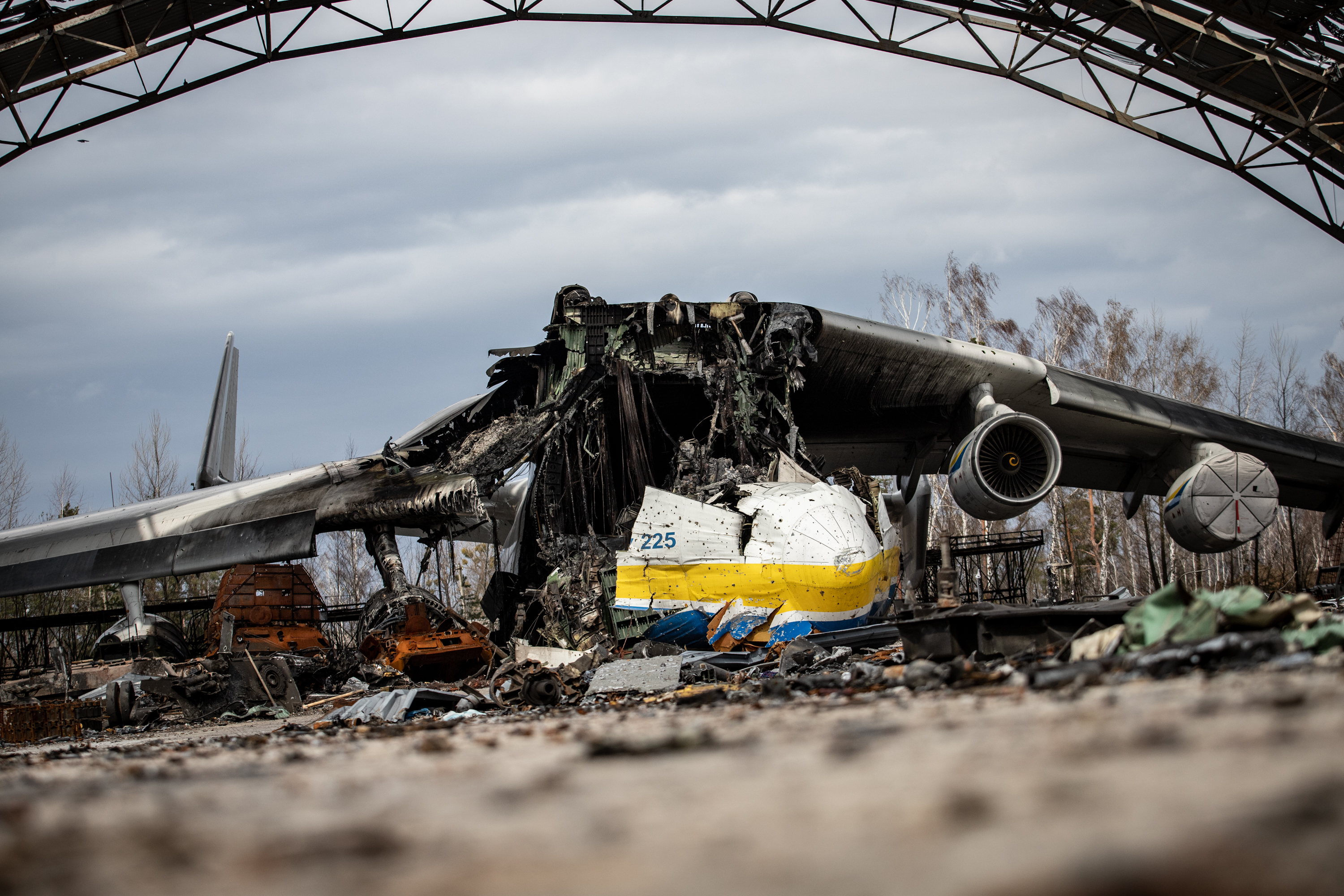
The Antonov An-225 Mriya, the largest aircraft ever built, was destroyed during the Battle of Antonov Airport.

By early March, further Russian advances along the west side of the Dnipro were limited, after suffering setbacks from Ukrainian defence. As of 5 March, a large Russian convoy, reportedly 64 kilometres (40 mi) in length, had made little progress toward Kyiv. The London-based think tank Royal United Services Institute (RUSI) assessed the Russian performance from the north and east as "stalled". Advances along the Chernihiv axis had largely halted as a siege of the city began. Russian forces also continued advancing from the northwest of Kyiv, capturing Bucha, Hostomel, and Vorzel by 5 March, though Irpin remained contested as of 9 March. By 11 March, it was reported that the lengthy convoy had largely dispersed, taking up positions that offered tree cover. Rocket launchers were also identified. On 16 March, Ukrainian forces began a counter-offensive to repel Russian forces approaching Kyiv from several surrounding cities.

By 20 March, the Russian military appeared to be waging a rapid invasion to achieve its apparent primary goal of the seizure of Kyiv, along with the occupation of Eastern Ukraine and the overthrow of the Ukrainian government. Russian forces quickly became stalled while approaching Kyiv due to several factors, including the disparity in morale and performance between Ukrainian and Russian forces, the Ukrainian use of sophisticated man-portable weapons provided by Western allies, poor Russian logistics and equipment performance, the failure of the Russian Air Force to achieve air superiority, and Russian military attrition during their siege of major cities. Unable to achieve a quick victory in Kyiv, Russian forces switched strategies and began using standoff weapons, indiscriminate bombing, and siege warfare.

On 25 March, the Ukrainian counteroffensive in Kyiv resulted in several towns, including Makariv, being retaken to the east and west of Kyiv. As part of a general retreat of Russian forces north of Kyiv, as well as attacks on Russian formations by the Ukrainian military, Russian troops in the Bucha area retreated north by the end of March. Ukrainian forces entered the city on 1 April. Ukraine claimed to recapture the entire region around Kyiv, including Irpin, Bucha, and Hostomel, by 2 April, with evidence of war crimes being uncovered in Bucha. On 6 April, NATO secretary general Jens Stoltenberg said that the Russian "retraction, resupply, and redeployment" of their troops from the Kyiv area should be interpreted as an expansion of Putin's plans for his military actions against Ukraine, by redeploying and concentrating his forces on Eastern Ukraine and Mariupol within the next two weeks, as a precursor to the further expansion of Putin's actions against the rest of Ukraine.

=== Northeastern front ===
Russian forces advanced into Chernihiv Oblast on 24 February, besieging its administrative capital within four days of fighting. On 25 February Ukrainian forces lost control over Konotop. As street fighting took place in the city of Sumy, just 35 kilometres (22 mi) from the Russo-Ukrainian border, Ukrainian forces claimed that on 28 February that 100 Russian armoured vehicles had been destroyed and dozens of soldiers captured following a Bayraktar TB2 drone and artillery attack on a large Russian column near Lebedyn in Sumy Oblast. Russian forces also attacked Okhtyrka, deploying thermobaric weapons.

On 4 March, Frederick Kagan wrote that the Sumy axis was then "the most successful and dangerous Russian avenue of advance on Kyiv", and commented that the geography favoured mechanised advances as the terrain "is flat and sparsely populated, offering few good defensive positions". Travelling along highways, Russian forces reached Brovary, an eastern suburb of Kyiv, on 4 March. The Pentagon confirmed on 6 April that the Russian army had left Chernihiv Oblast, but Sumy Oblast remained contested. On 7 April, the governor of Sumy Oblast said that Russian troops were gone, but had left behind rigged explosives and other hazards.

=== Southern front ===
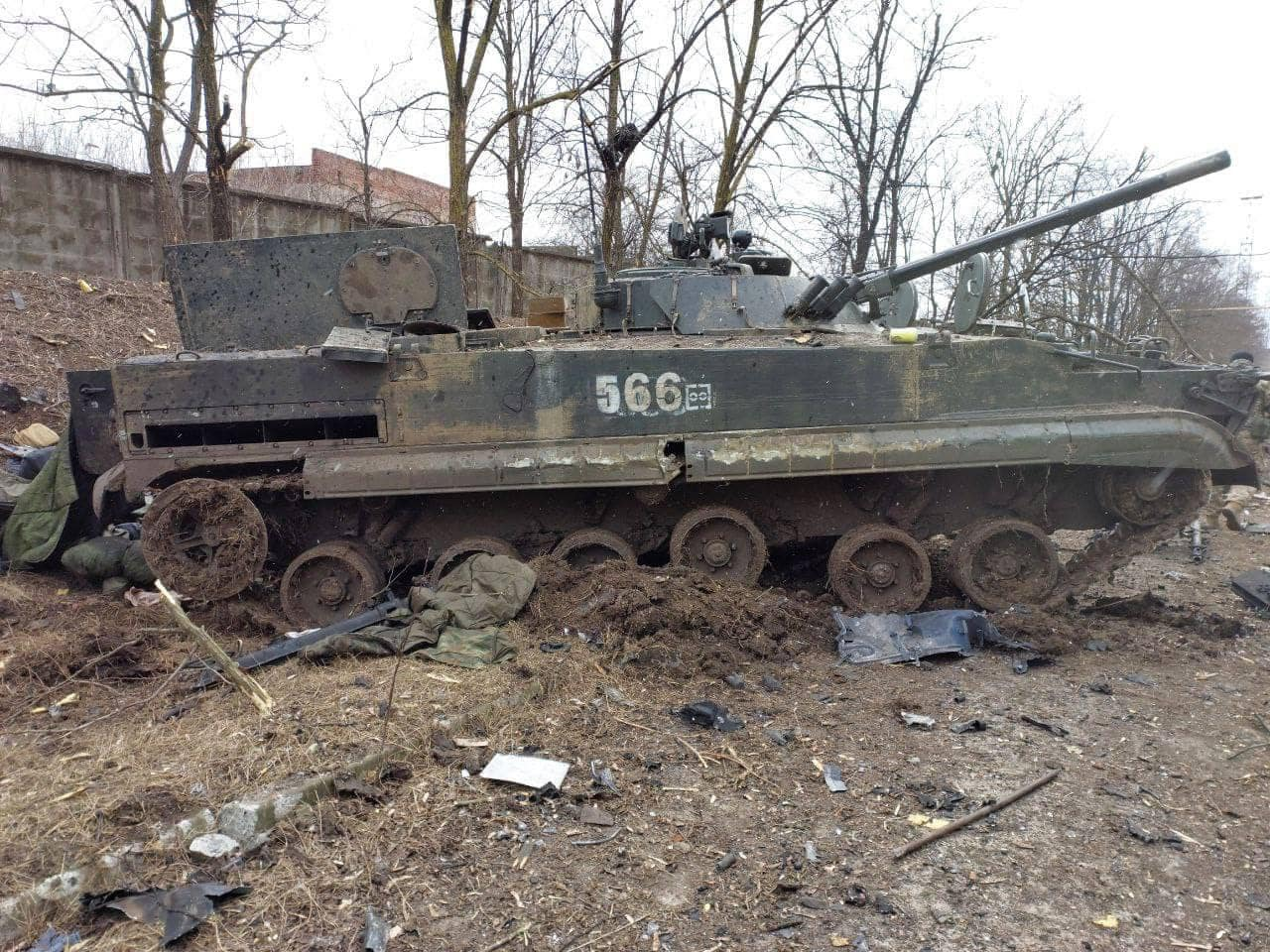
A destroyed Russian BMP-3 near Mariupol, 7 March 2022

On 24 February, Russian forces took control of the North Crimean Canal, allowing Crimea to obtain water from the Dnieper, which had been cut off since 2014. On 26 February, the siege of Mariupol began as the attack moved east linking to separatist-held Donbas. En route, Russian forces entered Berdiansk and captured it. On 25 February, Russian units from the DPR were fighting near Pavlopil as they moved on Mariupol. By evening, the Russian Navy began an amphibious assault on the coast of the Sea of Azov 70 kilometres (43 mi) west of Mariupol. A US defence official said that Russian forces were deploying thousands of marines from this beachhead.

The Russian 22nd Army Corps approached the Zaporizhzhia Nuclear Power Plant on 26 February and besieged Enerhodar. A fire began, but the Ukrainian military said that essential equipment was undamaged. A third Russian attack group from Crimea moved northwest and captured the bridge over the Dnieper. On 2 March, Russian troops took Kherson; this was the first major city to fall to Russian forces. Russian troops moved on Mykolaiv and attacked it two days later. They were repelled by Ukrainian forces.

After renewed missile attacks on 14 March in Mariupol, the Ukrainian government said more than 2,500 had died. By 18 March, Mariupol was completely encircled and fighting reached the city centre, hampering efforts to evacuate civilians. On 20 March, an art school sheltering around 400 people, was destroyed by Russian bombs. The Russians demanded surrender, and the Ukrainians refused. On 27 March, Ukrainian deputy prime minister Olha Stefanishyna said that "(m)ore than 85 percent of the whole town is destroyed."

Putin told Emmanuel Macron in a phone call on 29 March that the bombardment of Mariupol would only end when the Ukrainians surrendered. On 1 April, Russian troops refused safe passage into Mariupol to 50 buses sent by the United Nations to evacuate civilians, as peace talks continued in Istanbul. On 3 April, following the retreat of Russian forces from Kyiv, Russia expanded its attack on southern Ukraine further west, with bombardment and strikes against Odesa, Mykolaiv, and the Zaporizhzhia Nuclear Power Plant.

=== Eastern front ===
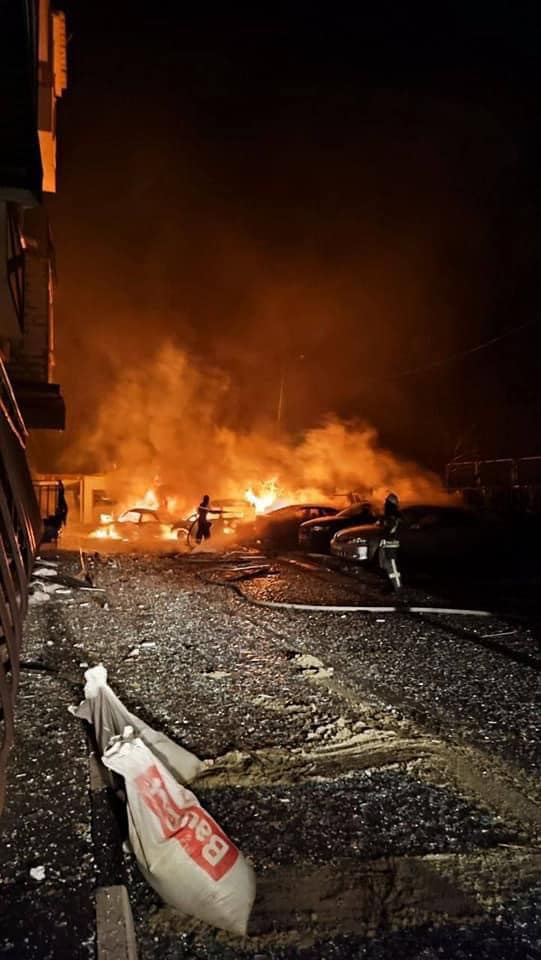
Russian bombardment on the outskirts of Kharkiv, 1 March 2022

In the east, Russian troops attempted to capture Kharkiv, less than 35 kilometres (22 mi) from the Russian border, and met strong Ukrainian resistance. On 25 February, the Millerovo air base was attacked by Ukrainian military forces with OTR-21 Tochka missiles, which according to Ukrainian officials, destroyed several Russian Air Force planes and started a fire. On 1 March, Denis Pushilin, head of the DPR, announced that DPR forces had almost completely surrounded the city of Volnovakha. On 2 March, Russian forces were repelled from Sievierodonetsk during an attack against the city. On the same day, Ukrainian forces initiated a counter-offensive on Horlivka, controlled by the DPR. Izium was captured by Russian forces on 1 April after a monthlong battle.

On 25 March, the Russian defence ministry said it would seek to occupy major cities in eastern Ukraine. On 31 March, PBS News reported renewed shelling and missile attacks in Kharkiv, as bad or worse than before, as peace talks with Russia were to resume in Istanbul.

Amid the heightened Russian shelling of Kharkiv on 31 March, Russia reported a helicopter strike against an oil supply depot approximately 35 kilometres (22 mi) north of the border in Belgorod, and accused Ukraine of the attack. Ukraine denied responsibility. By 7 April, the renewed massing of Russian invasion troops and tank divisions around the towns of Izium, Sloviansk, and Kramatorsk prompted Ukrainian government officials to advise the remaining residents near the eastern border of Ukraine to evacuate to western Ukraine within 2–3 days, given the absence of arms and munitions previously promised to Ukraine by then.

=== Western Ukraine ===
On 14 March, Russian forces conducted multiple cruise missile attacks on a military training facility in Yavoriv, Lviv Oblast, close to the Polish border. Local governor Maksym Kozytskyy reported that at least 35 people had been killed in the attacks. On 18 March, Russia expanded the attack to Lviv, with Ukrainian military officials saying initial information suggested that the missiles which hit Lviv were likely air-launched cruise missiles originating from warplanes flying over the Black Sea.

=== Air conflict ===
On 24 February, Russian forces attacked the Chuhuiv air base, which housed Bayraktar TB2 drones. The attack caused damage to fuel storage areas and infrastructure. The next day, the Millerovo air base was attacked by Ukrainian military forces using OTR-21 Tochka missiles. According to Ukrainian officials, this destroyed several Russian Air Force planes and set the airbase on fire. In the Zhytomyr Airport attack on 27 February, it was reported that Russia used 9K720 Iskander missile systems, located in Belarus, to attack the civilian Zhytomyr Airport. Russia lost at least ten aircraft on 5 March. On 6 March, the General Staff of the Armed Forces of Ukraine reported that 88 Russian aircraft had been destroyed since the war began. However, an anonymous senior US defence official told Reuters on 7 March that Russia still had the "vast majority" of its fighter jets and helicopters that had been amassed near Ukraine available to fly. After the first month of the invasion, Justin Bronk, a British military observer, counted the Russian aircraft losses at 15 fixed-wing aircraft and 35 helicopters, but noted that the true total was certainly higher.

On 13 March, Russian forces conducted multiple cruise missile attacks on a military training facility in Yavoriv, Lviv Oblast, close to the Polish border. Local governor Maksym Kozytskyy reported that at least 35 people had been killed in the attacks. The poor performance of the Russian Air Force has been attributed by The Economist to Russia's inability to suppress Ukraine's medium ranged surface-to-air missile (SAM) batteries, Russia's lack of precision-guided bombs, together with Ukrainian mid-range SAM sites that force planes to fly low, making them vulnerable to Stinger and other shoulder-launched surface-to-air missiles, and lack of training and flight hours for Russian pilots rendering them inexperienced for the type of close ground support missions typical of modern air forces.

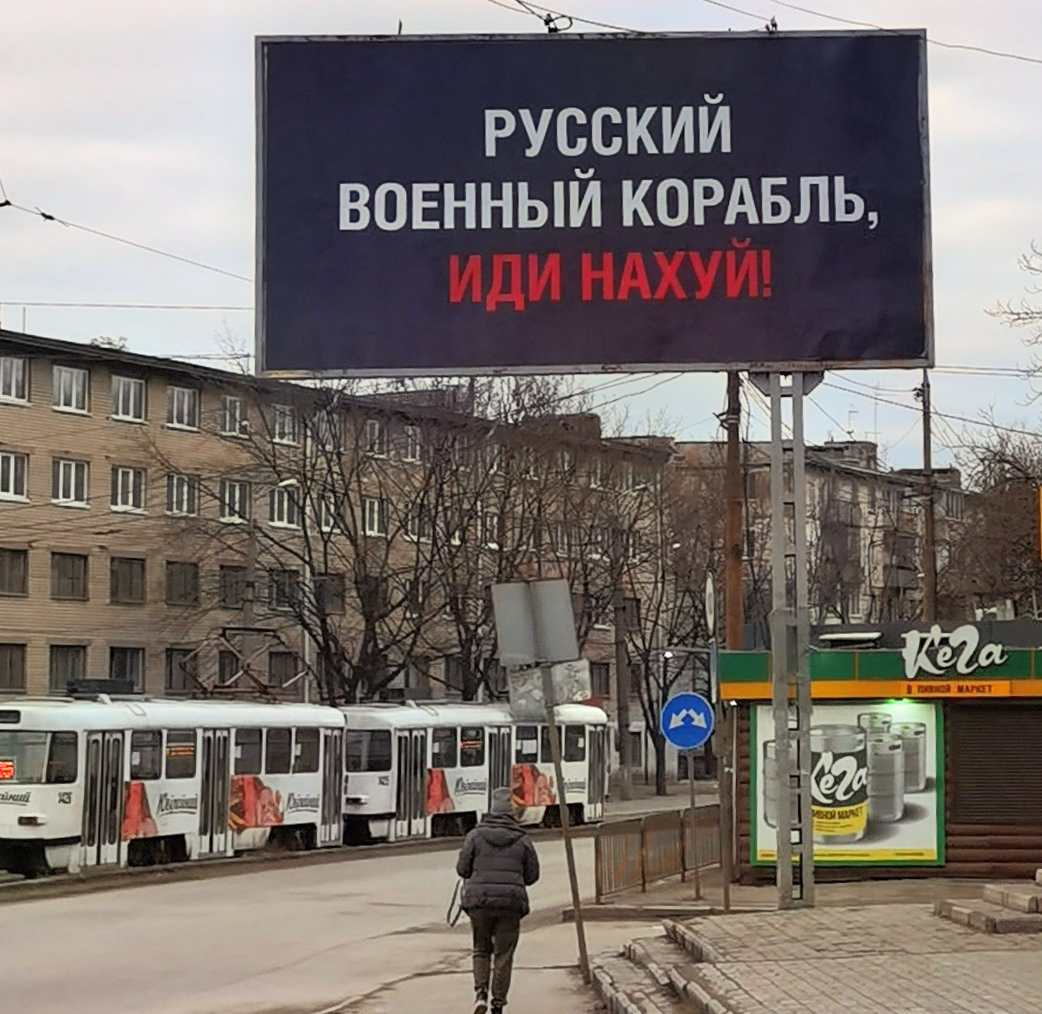
"Russian warship go fuck yourself!", billboard in Russian language in Dnipro, Ukraine

=== Naval conflict ===
Ukraine lies on the Black Sea, which only has access through the Turkish-held Bosphorus and Dardanelles straits. On 28 February, Turkey invoked the 1936 Montreux Convention and sealed off the straits to Russian warships not registered as having Black Sea home bases and not returning to their ports of origin. This prevented the passage of four Russian naval vessels through the Turkish Straits.

On 24 February, the State Border Guard Service of Ukraine announced that an attack on Snake Island by Russian Navy ships had begun. The cruiser Moskva and patrol boat Vasily Bykov bombarded the island with their deck guns. When the Russian warship identified itself and instructed the Ukrainian soldiers stationed on the island to surrender, their response was "Russian warship, go fuck yourself!" After the bombardment, a detachment of Russian soldiers landed and took control of Snake Island.

Russia stated on 26 February that US drones were supplying intelligence to the Ukrainian navy to help target Russian warships in the Black Sea, which the US denied.

By 3 March, the Ukrainian frigate Hetman Sahaidachny, the flagship of the Ukrainian navy, was scuttled in Mykolaiv to prevent its capture by Russian forces. On 14 March, the Russian source RT reported that the Russian Armed Forces had captured about a dozen Ukrainian ships in Berdiansk, including the Polnocny-class landing ship Yuri Olefirenko. On 24 March, Ukrainian officials said that a Russian landing ship docked in Berdiansk was destroyed by a Ukrainian rocket attack.

== Aftermath ==
=== Analysis of the invasion ===
==== Russian forces ====
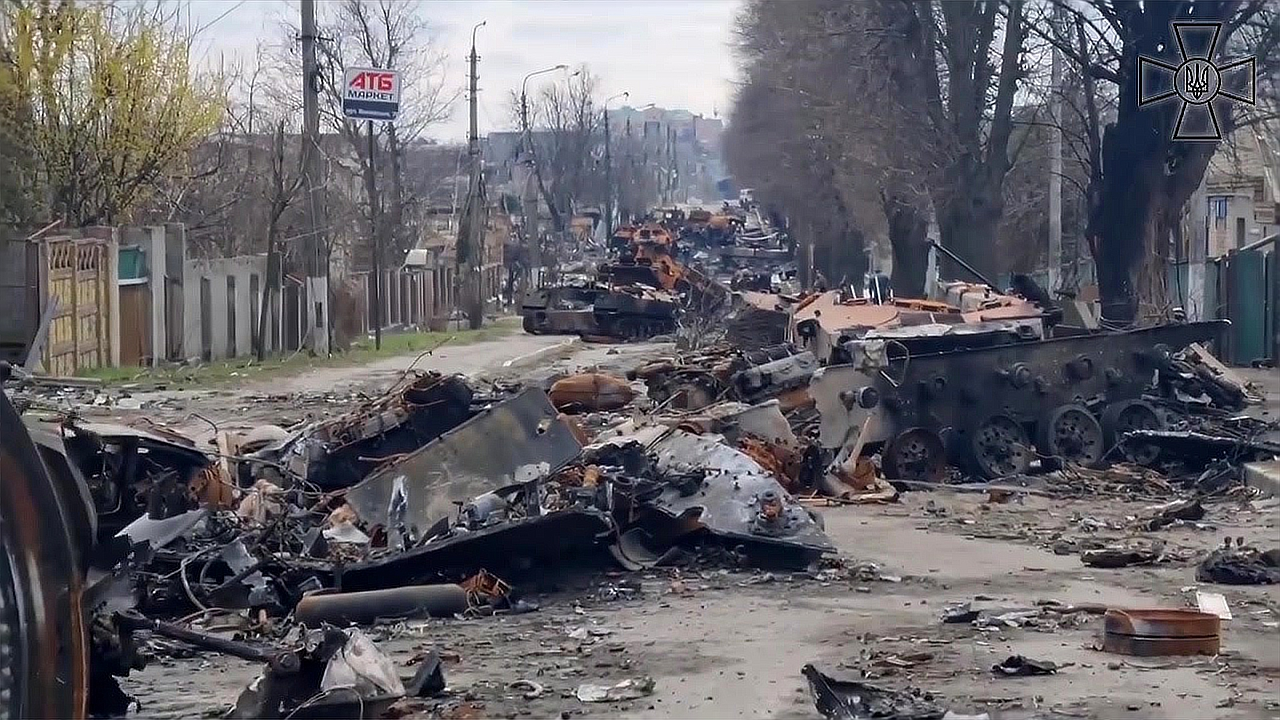
Remnants of a destroyed Russian column on 27 February in Bucha

Military analysts have been highly critical of the Russian plan of invasion. Writing in 2024, Michael Kofman attributed the failure of the Russian invasion to "unworkable concept of operations, which did not anticipate or plan to engage an organised and sustained Ukrainian defence", and attacked the road-bound deployment of Russian forces during the invasion, as well as the excessive reliance of the invasion plan on subversion and special operations such as the airborne attack at Hostomel. Kofman also criticised the use of "thunder runs" similar to those used by US forces in the 2003 Iraq war, in an environment where resistance to such attempts to go around urban centres was likely to be far higher. The November 2022 Royal United Services Institute (RUSI) report on the invasion also criticised the invasion plan as being based on "false assumptions", and spreading Russian forces too thinly across too many objectives, with insufficient contingency-planning for what to do if things went wrong. Nevertheless, RUSI also stated that "If competently executed, these plans could have succeeded".

Writing in 2024 in the Journal of Strategic Studies, analysts from the Swiss Military Academy at ETH Zurich characterised the invasion plan as being "predicated on a rapid, decisive overthrow of the government in Kyiv, presuming minimal resistance". They also criticised what they saw as the excessively rigid, Soviet-style command structure and operational planning of Russian forces during the invasion.

Russian air forces during the campaign were described by military analyst Sean M. Wiswesser, writing in 2023 in the Small Wars & Insurgencies journal, as having "bungled air operations from the outset of the war". Wiswesser described the Russian air forces as having "settled largely for a 'tie'" during the period of the invasion.

The force-structure of Russian forces during the invasion has also been criticised, particularly the use of battalion tactical groups (BTGs), which proved brittle once Ukrainian resistance was met. Writing in 2025, Alexander Hill, professor of military history at the University of Calgary, described Russian BTGs as lacking "the requisite level of infantry (and indeed artillery) support for their armour that was being unimaginatively funnelled down relatively narrow axes of advance", and stated that Russian officers "struggled to command multiple BTGs to good effect".

==== Ukrainian forces ====
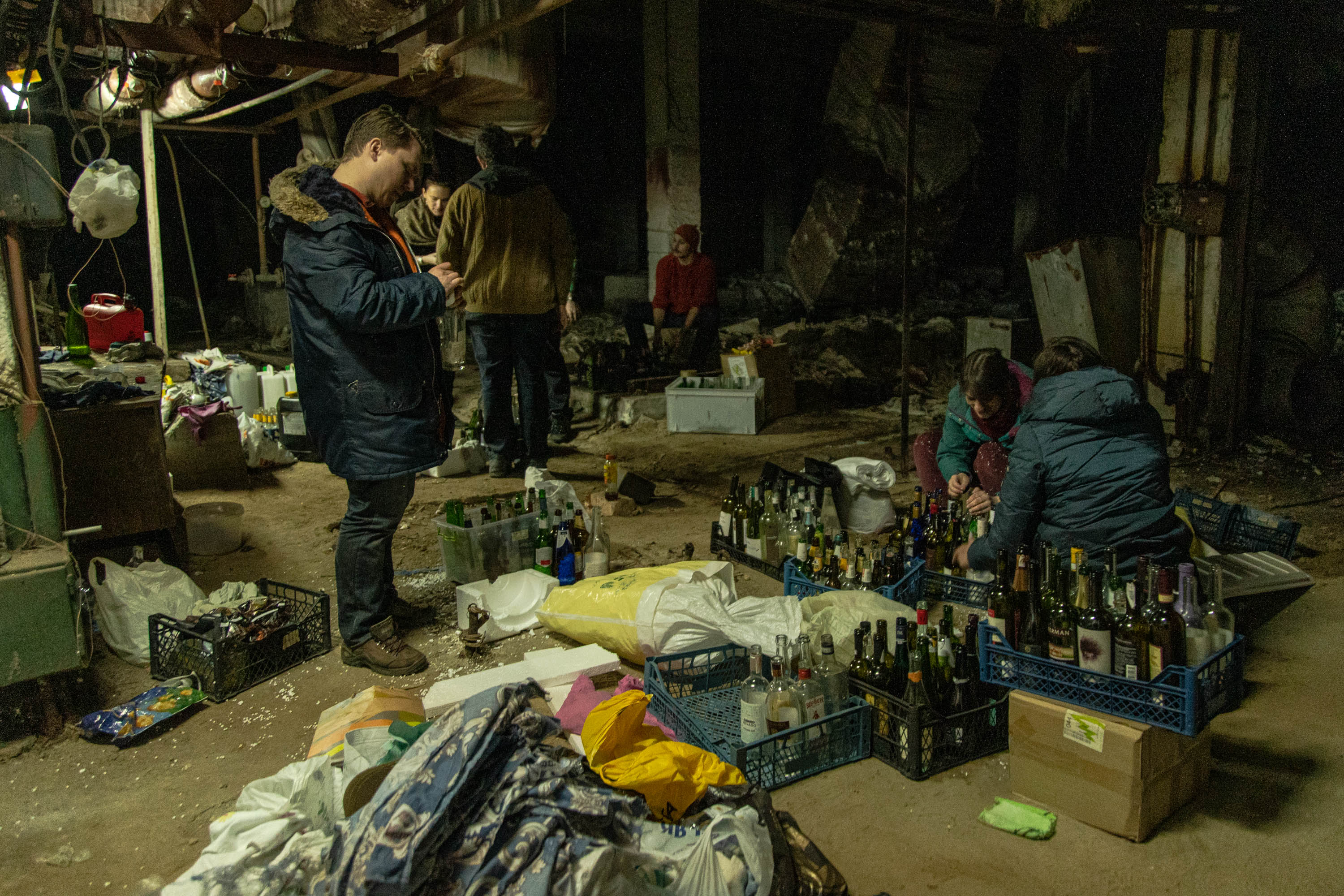
Civilians in Kyiv preparing Molotov cocktails, 26 February

Whilst praising Ukraine's resistance to the invasion, analysts have also identified deficiencies in the deployment of Ukrainian forces before the invasion. According to Kofman, Ukrainian forces proved flexible in comparison to the rigid deployment of Russian forces, but Ukrainian forces were overly concentrated in the east, "leaving the capital almost completely undefended", meaning that only "[an] eleventh-hour sortie ... saved the armed forces from catastrophic losses". Similarly RUSI state that the "Russian deception plan was largely successful" in drawing Ukrainian forces towards Donbas, including a failure to deploy any major units to defend the approach from the Crimea, though RUSI also note that this came at the cost of Russian troops being insufficiently briefed before the invasion. At the tactical level, however, RUSI assessed Ukrainian forces as comprising "units which had been psychologically and practically preparing for this fight for eight years". Alexander Hill described Ukrainian forces as having undergone a transformation since the fighting of 2014, and having become "a stubborn opponent that was typically difficult [for Russian troops] to dislodge".

=== Changes in command-structure ===
Russian forces did not deploy an overall commander for the invasion of Ukraine, with command divided between the military district commanders, each of whom was assigned to their own axis of attack. According to Mason Clark of the Institute for the Study of War, this resulted in commanders competing for central resources and each effectively fighting their own war. Subsequent to the failure of this strategy, according to Clark, Putin appointed Aleksandr Dvornikov as an overall commander in Ukraine on 8 April 2022, however Dvornikov retained his post as commander of the Southern Military District. Dissatisfied with Dvornikov's performance, according to Clark, Putin then dismissed Dvornikov as overall commander in June 2022 but allowed him to remain in overall command for several weeks, before Gennady Zhidko was reportedly appointed to that role. However, according to Clark, both Zhidko and Dvornikov were effectively "first among equals" among the Russian Military District Commanders rather than true theatre commanders, and it was not until October 2022 that a dedicated theatre commander - Sergey Surovikin - was appointed.

=== Subsequent military operations ===
Ukrainian regions annexed by Russia since 2014 (Autonomous Republic of Crimea and Sevastopol) and 2022 (others). The 2022 annexation created a strategic land bridge between Crimea and Russia.

Russia abandoned the attempt to take Kyiv in early April, but a lasting state of war between Russia and Ukraine remained, with Russia capturing Mariupol by 20 May 2022, and maintaining an occupation of large portions of four Ukrainian oblasts—Donetsk, Kherson, Luhansk, and Zaporizhzhia. In August, Ukrainian forces began liberating territories in the north-east and south.

On 30 September 2022, Russia declared the annexation of the four partially-occupied oblasts, which was internationally condemned. Most of Luhansk Oblast and part of Donetsk Oblast had been controlled by pro-Russian separatists since 2014, while the Kherson and Zaporizhzhia oblasts were invaded by Russia in 2022. The boundaries of the areas to be annexed and their borders were not defined; Russian officials stated that they would be defined later. None of the oblasts were fully under Russian control at the time of the declaration, nor since. If limited to the areas then under Russian control (about 90,000 km^{2} or 15% of Ukraine's territory, roughly the size of Portugal) the annexation would still be the largest in Europe since World War II. In other respects as well—in terms of the scale and intensity of hostilities, and the number of casualties—after the invasion, the war became the biggest war in Europe since World War II.

From then through 2023, Russian offensives and Ukrainian counteroffensives gained only small amounts of territory. The war has also led to attacks in Russia by Ukrainian and Ukrainian-backed forces, among them a cross-border offensive into Russia's Kursk region in August 2024. Russia has repeatedly carried out deliberate and indiscriminate attacks on civilians far from the frontline. The International Criminal Court (ICC) opened an investigation into war crimes and issued arrest warrants for Putin and several other Russian officials.

== International reactions ==
UN General Assembly Resolution ES-11/1 vote on 2 March 2022 condemning the invasion of Ukraine and demanding a complete withdrawal of Russian troops In favour Against Abstained Absent Non-member

The invasion received widespread international condemnation from governments and intergovernmental organisations. On 2 March 2022 and on 23 February 2023, 141 member states of the UN General Assembly voted for a resolution saying that Russia should immediately withdraw. Seven, including Russia, voted against the measure. Political reactions to the invasion included new sanctions imposed on Russia, which triggered widespread economic effects on the Russian and world economies. Sanctions forced Russia to reorient its oil exports to non-sanctioning countries such as India, rely more on LNG (which was not subject to European Union sanctions), and shift its coal exports from Europe to Asia. Most European countries cancelled nuclear cooperation with Russia.

Over seventy sovereign states and the European Union delivered humanitarian aid to Ukraine, and nearly fifty countries plus the EU provided military aid. Economic sanctions included a ban on Russian aircraft using EU airspace, a ban of certain Russian banks from the SWIFT international payments system, and a ban on certain Russian media outlets. Reactions to the invasion have included public response, media responses, peace efforts, and the examination of the legal implications of the invasion.

Some countries, particularly in the Global South, saw public sympathy or outright support for Russia, due in part to distrust of US foreign policy. Protests and demonstrations were held worldwide, including some in Russia and parts of Ukraine occupied by Russia. Calls for a boycott of Russian goods spread on social media platforms, while hackers attacked Russian websites, particularly those operated by the Russian government. Anti-Russian sentiment against Russians living abroad surged after the invasion. In March 2022, Russian's parliament introduced prison sentences of up to 15 years for publishing "fake news" about Russian military operations, intended to suppress any criticism related to the war.

== See also ==
- 2020s in military history
- List of invasions in the 21st century
- Russo-Georgian War
