= UFMS =

UFMS may refer to:

- Federal Migration Service
- Federal University of Mato Grosso do Sul
