= Andrei Kikot =

Russian politician and lawyer

- Андрей Кикоть
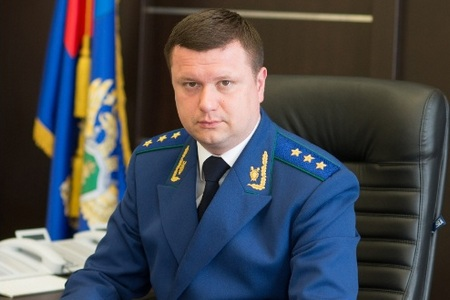

Head of the Service for Citizenship and Registration of Foreign Citizens
- Incumbent
- Assumed office 2 April 2025
- Preceded by: Valentina Kazakova

Personal details
- Born: 20 August 1976 (age 50)
- Died: Moscow, Russian SFSR
- Parent: Vladimir Kikot (father)
- Education: Leningrad Academy of the Ministry of Internal Affairs of Russia

Military service
- Allegiance: Russia
- Branch/service: Ministry of Internal Affairs
- Rank: Lieutenant general

Andrey Vladimirovich Kikot (Russian: Андрей Владимирович Кикоть; born 20 August 1976) is a Russian politician and lawyer. He has served as First Deputy Minister of Internal Affairs of the Russian Federation and Head of the Service for Citizenship and Registration of Foreign Citizens of the Ministry of Internal Affairs since April 2, 2025. He is a State Counselor of Justice, 1st Class, Police Colonel General (2025), and a PhD in Law. He is an Honorary Employee of the Prosecutor's Office of the Russian Federation.

He served as Deputy Prosecutor General of the Russian Federation from 2017 to 2025, overseeing the activities of the Prosecutor General's Office of the Russian Federation in the Southern Federal District.

== Biography ==
Born in 1976 in Leningrad, the son of Vladimir Kikot. In 1998, he graduated from the St. Petersburg Academy of the Ministry of Internal Affairs of Russia with a degree in jurisprudence. In 1998, Andrei Kikot made a rare transition from the police to the prosecutor's office, where he began as an investigator, handling criminal cases involving premeditated murders, as well as other serious crimes against persons, and some official misconduct. In the early 2000s, he served as a supervisor for the Department of Internal Affairs, later becoming the Deputy Prosecutor of St. Petersburg for the Supervision of Law Enforcement at High-Security Facilities, overseeing the Department of Internal Affairs.

In 2004, he became the prosecutor of the Krasnogvardeysky District of St. Petersburg, then the prosecutor of the Vyborg District of St. Petersburg. According to Kommersant newspaper, since then, Kikot has consistently been the youngest person to hold positions at various levels, and in 2005-2006, he was consistently recognized as the best district prosecutor in St. Petersburg. As a result, he was appointed Deputy Prosecutor of St. Petersburg, where he oversaw crime prevention, operational investigative activities, international legal cooperation, and migration legislation, and headed the interdepartmental working group on combating corruption.

In December 2011, at the age of 35, he became Prosecutor of the Novgorod Oblast, and was soon awarded the rank of State Justice Counselor, 3rd Class. Kikot's office also combated white-collar crime. For example, starting in 2012, the Novgorod Prosecutor's Office oversaw an investigation into an organized crime group led by the region's First Deputy Governor, Arnold Shalmuyev. He and other defendants in the case of embezzlement of budget funds allocated for road maintenance in the Novgorod Oblast were convicted and sentenced to lengthy prison terms.

From March 22, 2017, he served as Deputy Prosecutor General of the Russian Federation. Having headed the Prosecutor General's Office for the federal district assigned to him, Kikot began a personnel rotation in the Southern Federal District, for example, replacing Alexei Samsonov, the Prosecutor General of Kalmykia.

On April 2, 2025, he was appointed First Deputy Minister of Internal Affairs of the Russian Federation and Head of the Service for Citizenship and Registration of Foreign Citizens of the Ministry of Internal Affairs of the Russian Federation. On May 15, by decree of the President of Russia, he was awarded the rank of Colonel General of Police.

== Criticism ==
Novaya Gazeta noted that the text of Kikot's dissertation largely coincides with the texts of the doctoral dissertations of his supervisor, Yu.E. Avrutin, and, accordingly, of Central Election Commission member S.M. Shapiev. Human rights activists Andrei Illarionov and Lev Ponomarev identified violations in the activities of the Deputy Prosecutor of the City of St. Petersburg, Kikot, and even included Andrei Vladimirovich in the "list of 126 corrupt officials".
