= Immigration to Russia =

Immigration to Russia involves both temporary workers and those seeking permanent residence in the Russian Federation. Historically, the Russian Empire was one of the world's leading destinations for immigrants, starting with the reign of Peter I (1682–1725) and especially after the ascension of Catherine II in 1762, until the October Revolution in 1917. Some regions, such as Novorossiya, Slavo-Serbia, Volga, and Bessarabia were specifically designated for resettlement of immigrants.

Immigration to Russia was relatively low during the Soviet period (1922–1991) and through the early post-Soviet years (1992–2005). Russia experienced a considerable population decline during the latter period due to a decreased birthrate, lowered life expectancy and growing emigration. To combat these demographic problems, the Russian government adopted in 2006 the "Program for the return of compatriots to Russia", which was made into a permanent law in 2012. The law defines "compatriots" as individuals who are direct descendants (either matrilineal or patrilineal) of people who had lived within the current territory of Russia. In February 2024, in order to expedite and to simplify the immigration process the requirement for conversational ability in Russian was waived.

Due to these policy changes, Russia has experienced an overall population increase starting in 2012. According to Rosstat, the federal statistics agency, and the United Nations, the number of legal immigrants in Russia between 2000 and 2015 fluctuated between 11 and 12 million, or about 8% of the population. In 2020, Russia ranked fourth globally by the largest number of immigrants, after the United States, Germany and Saudi Arabia. At the same time, Russia ranked third worldwide by the number of emigrants, after India and Mexico.

The majority of recent immigrants to Russia come from former Soviet republics, especially Tajikistan, Kyrgyzstan, Ukraine, Armenia, Kazakhstan and Uzbekistan. Although the Russian government actively encourages immigration of ethnic Russians, most immigrants from the former Soviet republics in recent years were not ethnic Russians. Legal immigrants in Russia receive both grant money and repayable low-interest loans issued by Rossotrudnichestvo.

== Procedure ==
The standard legal immigration status obtaining procedure consists of the following time-divided steps: obtaining a temporary residence permit; obtaining a permanent residence permit and obtaining Russian citizenship. Under current law, one can receive citizenship of Russia after five years of residence and after passing an exam in Russian language, civics and history. Immigration to Russia is regulated by the Main Directorate for Migration Affairs of the Ministry of Internal Affairs of Russian Federation.

Anyone who works in Russia for five years and develops fluency in the Russian language can become a citizen, provided they have not committed a crime. Almost anyone who is hired by a Russian firm can stay in the country and work indefinitely. This reflects a policy change, in response to declining birth rates, on the part of the government of Vladimir Putin from the more restrictive policy enacted after the 1991 dissolution of the Soviet Union. The large non-Slavic immigrant populations arriving in response to Putin's liberal policy have sometimes encountered xenophobia. To counter this, pursuant to Russian hate-speech laws, the Russian state has shut down various anti-immigrant groups, such as the Movement Against Illegal Immigration.

The immigration process usually includes several steps. Firstly, it is required to establish connections with Russia in order to be eligible for temporary or permanent residency. It may be granted on the grounds of having employment, studying, having Russian relatives or ancestry, investing or purchasing a property. The next step is to apply for temporary residency (some applicants may skip this step). After one year of living as a temporary resident it is possible to apply for permanent residency. Finally, after 5 years of living as a permanent resident it is possible to apply for Russian citizenship.

Native speakers of the Russian language, spouses of Russian citizens, highly qualified specialists (e.g. with PhD or MD degrees), investors and refugees are eligible for a simplified immigration procedure. Some categories of applicants may skip temporary residency and apply for citizenship after 1–3 years of living in Russia.

== Statistics ==
=== Recent trends ===
Countries with at least 5,000 persons immigrating each year.
Country	Gross immigration												
Country	2000	2005	2010	2015	2016	2017	2018	2019	2020	2021	2022	2023	2024
Tajikistan	11,043	4,717	18,188	47,638	52,676	63,467	67,929	89,553	93,333	126,840	186,560	171,234	219,739
Kyrgyzstan	15,536	15,592	20,901	26,045	28,202	41,165	44,408	53,810	45,676	61,101	62,360	54,162	146,915
Uzbekistan	40,810	30,436	24,100	74,242	60,977	64,073	55,378	60,796	50,188	56,808	54,035	44,536	146,090
Armenia	15,951	7,581	19,890	45,670	43,929	46,898	46,442	71,984	56,511	70,078	59,533	48,855	78,573
Kazakhstan	124,903	51,945	27,862	65,750	69,356	71,680	72,141	86,311	64,494	72,668	64,382	48,465	71,694
China	1,121	432	1,380	9,043	8,027	8,237	7,067	15,306	7,270	6,465	7,964	11,483	35,587
Turkmenistan	6,738	4,104	2,283	6,539	7,242	8,734	10,509	14,632	12,930	10,449	12,133	13,345	34,302
Azerbaijan	14,906	4,600	14,500	24,326	24,109	25,602	26,690	34,619	32,135	35,209	31,773	24,340	28,108
India	203	54	110	2,894	4,768	5,622	5,032	9,588	4,506	7,132	8,275	10,868	27,010
Ukraine	74,748	30,760	27,508	194,810	178,274	150,182	137,776	161,351	143,988	122,669	148,846	50,929	26,791
Belarus	10,274	6,797	4,894	17,741	14,590	21,282	19,045	18,428	14,536	23,120	18,824	12,496	22,924
Moldova	11,652	6,569	11,814	34,026	32,418	31,369	30,676	26,513	22,129	27,248	23,540	22,502	20,766
Vietnam	182	114	921	4,012	3,735	3,912	3,981	6,742	6,206	5,426	5,655	8,785	12,812
(Georgia (country)) Georgia; *Abkhazia (disp. status); *South Ossetia (disp. status)	20,213 – –	5,497 – –	5,245; 814; 33	7,038; 2,267; 342	6,511; 2,261; 216	6,809; 2,357; 270	6,345; 1,975; 260	6,925; 1,429; 110	5,764; 1,217; 131	6,506; 1,190; 148	6,002; 1,262; 137	4,602; 1,074; 171	4,781; 737 –
Total	359,330	177,230	191,656	598,617	575,158	589,033	565,685	701,234	594,146	667,922	730,347	560,434	958,867

Country	Net immigration												
Country	2000	2005	2010	2015	2016	2017	2018	2019	2020	2021	2022	2023	2024
Tajikistan	9,885	4,283	17,494	11,362	27,288	34,639	31,028	48,374	39,424	96,609	87,264	81,684	128,017
Uzbekistan	37,724	29,841	23,266	−20,668	19,672	22,167	6,807	19,129	4,927	36,009	−8,455	3,639	106,901
Kyrgyzstan	13,679	15,119	20,260	9,935	11,043	19,355	8,978	15,106	1,402	42,549	−6,824	4,956	104,645
Armenia	14,432	6,961	19,192	20,533	11,993	13,999	14,358	35,109	−1,836	45,235	−10,706	11,188	42,068
Kazakhstan	106,990	39,508	20,533	34,767	37,130	32,736	26,516	39,166	8,440	48,317	−4,947	11,435	36,354
China	463	−24	1,132	−778	−810	637	−477	6,679	−3,764	4,248	−3,018	3,971	24,252
Turkmenistan	6,062	3,979	2,178	2,320	2,418	2,873	2,951	6,198	778	7,230	−3,702	4,750	23,369
India	−	41	93	1,282	1,421	1,437	−185	4,326	−4,779	5,007	−851	3,051	15,631
Belarus	−3,002	763	1,995	4,909	2,127	11,770	7,191	6,283	−1,403	15,424	−161	–261	12,349
Azerbaijan	11,719	3,326	13,389	10,660	10,439	8,599	8,737	17,005	10,894	23,659	−3,712	3,516	7,137
Vietnam	149	69	889	1,004	394	1,194	684	3,461	308	3,402	−2,564	3,452	6,620
Moldova	9,415	5,783	11,197	17,380	14,364	9,605	7,688	5,385	3,490	16,144	2,355	8,750	6,576
(Georgia (country)) Georgia; *Abkhazia (disp. status); *South Ossetia (disp. status)	18,411 – –	4,806 – –	4,786; 732; 23	3,309; 1,272 -282	2,294; 1,240; 83	2,586; 1,975; 180	2,031; 1,975; 96	2,840; 147 -4	1,274; 30; 14	3,838; 245; 87	−196; 1,134; 39	771; 343; 103	1,200; 44 –
Ukraine	39,147	18,120	21,230	146,131	118,819	47,691	14,822	64,245	52,775	64,669	27,267	–29,618	–26,243
Total	213,610	107,432	158,078	245,384	261,948	211,878	124,854	285,103	106,510	429,902	61,917	109,952	535,715

=== Foreign population ===
As of May 2022, there are 5.99 million foreigners residing in the Russian Federation (up from 5.66 million in 2021 but down from 10.13 million in 2019), with the vast majority (91%) being citizens of CIS countries. Central Asians make up the most numerous group, followed by Ukrainian citizens. Temporary migration from Uzbekistan, Tajikistan and Kyrgyzstan increased after a marked decline in 2020–2021. Other CIS countries have steadily demonstrated a decrease in the number of migrants.

According to the Ministry of Internal Affairs, as of November 2021, there were 5.5 million migrants in Russia. Of these, 819,600 were in the country illegally. In the first quarter of 2021, 1345 migrants were deported, more than in the same period last year. The number of deported migrants increased in Russia.

Between January 2025 and January 2026, amid new migration legislation, a 10% reduction in the number of foreigners living in Russia was shown. In 2026, the foreign population in Russia was shown at 5.7 million down from 6.3 million the year before.

Foreign residents from the CIS in Russia:

Country of origin	Population (2022)	2021–2022 change
Uzbekistan	1,626,308 ▲	+435,674
Tajikistan	1,262,695 ▲	+453,529
Kyrgyzstan	681,165 ▲	+58,122
Ukraine	597,051 ▼	-57,869
Belarus	428,239 ▼	-134,722
Armenia	280,520 ▼	-67,160
Kazakhstan	228,142 ▼	-35,349
Azerbaijan	215,481 ▼	-83,600
Moldova	76,645 ▼	-56,230

Foreign residents in Russia: 2019

Country of citizenship	Number
Australia	97
Austria	132
Azerbaijan	96,501
Albania	35
Algeria	334
Angola	13
Argentina	104
Armenia	90,659
Aruba	6
Afghanistan	4300
Bangladesh	154
Bahrain	2
Belarus	34,748
Belgium	142
Benin	29
Bermuda	2
Bulgaria	1439
Bolivia	36
Bosnia and Herzegovina	529
Brazil	174
Burkina Faso	2
Burundi	10
United Kingdom	490
Hungary	151
Venezuela	56
Vietnam	13,133
Gabon	2
Haiti	5
Guyana	2
Gambia	3
Ghana	57
Guatemala	7
Guinea	46
Guinea-Bissau	12
Germany	2632
Honduras	1
Greece	1336
Georgia	21,142
Denmark	70
Dominica	2
Dominican Republic	35
Egypt	1262
Zambia	14
Zimbabwe	3
Israel	1807
India	1074
Indonesia	49
Jordan	434
Iraq	581
Iran	359
Ireland	53
Iceland	11
Spain	346
Italy	1117
Yemen	328
Cape Verde	521
Kazakhstan	86,358
Cambodia	2
Cameroon	136
Canada	155
Kenya	17
Cyprus	51
Kyrgyzstan	24,625
China	8576
Colombia	80
Comoros	2
Congo	69
DR Congo	33
North Korea	143
South Korea	597
Costa Rica	6
Ivory Coast	54
Cuba	327
Kuwait	9
Laos	18
Latvia	3347
Lesotho	3
Liberia	1
Lebanon	227
Libya	65
Lithuania	4025
Luxembourg	1
Mauritius	12
Madagascar	17
North Macedonia	170
Malawi	1
Malaysia	8
Mali	9
Maldives	1
Malta	10
Morocco	281
Mexico	66
Mozambique	9
Moldova	54,826
Mongolia	478
Myanmar	6
Namibia	1
Nepal	79
Niger	11
Nigeria	287
Netherlands	209
Nicaragua	13
New Zealand	22
Norway	60
United Arab Emirates	7
Oman	5
Pakistan	324
Palestine	261
Panama	13
Paraguay	6
Peru	80
Poland	950
Portugal	45
Rwanda	5
Romania	121
Saudi Arabia	12
Seychelles	3
Senegal	17
Saint Kitts and Nevis	1
Serbia	2326
Singapore	4
Syria	3629
Slovakia	181
Slovenia	413
United States	1153
Somalia	4
Sudan	104
Tajikistan	144,222
Thailand	133
Taiwan	20
Tanzania	12
Togo	3
Tunisia	364
Turkmenistan	7150
Turkey	4607
Uganda	12
Uzbekistan	135,447
Ukraine	270,400
Uruguay	5
Philippines	93
Finland	205
France	689
Croatia	152
Central African Republic	1
Chad	9
Montenegro	240
Czech Republic	176
Chile	32
Switzerland	101
Sweden	152
Sri Lanka	69
Ecuador	56
Estonia	1410
Ethiopia	10
South Africa	57
Jamaica	4
Japan	206
Stateless persons	8157
Total	1,046,056

=== Naturalisations in Russia ===
2021

Country	Number
Australia	19
Austria	9
Saint Kitts and Nevis	1
Azerbaijan	30,791
Albania	13
Algeria	90
Angola	9
Argentina	17
Armenia	46,931
Afghanistan	1,411
Bangladesh	51
Belarus	24,539
Belgium	17
Benin	12
Bulgaria	309
Bolivia	9
Bosnia and Herzegovina	144
Brazil	45
Burundi	2
United Kingdom	99
Hungary	27
Venezuela	19
Vietnam	1,947
Gabon	2
Haiti	4
Mauritius	4
Guyana	1
Gambia	1
Cape Verde	1
Hong Kong	1
Ghana	19
Guatemala	3
Guinea	9
Costa Rica	4
Guinea-Bissau	4
Germany	481
Madagascar	9
Malta	3
Greece	183
Georgia	5,076
Denmark	16
Dominican Republic	10
Egypt	414
Iceland	10
Zambia	5
Israel	466
India	159
Indonesia	2
Jordan	127
Iraq	159
Iran	137
Spain	48
Italy	226
Yemen	111
South Ossetia	184
Kazakhstan	49,862
Cameroon	55
Cambodia	1
Canada	69
Kenya	5
Cyprus	6
Kyrgyzstan	19,241
China	83
Colombia	31
Congo	31
DR Congo	15
North Korea	5
Portugal	11
South Korea	11
Ivory Coast	26
Cuba	98
Laos	1
Myanmar	1
Paraguay	1
Latvia	375
Lebanon	107
Libya	10
Lithuania	380
North Macedonia	34
Malaysia	2
Mali	9
Morocco	90
Ireland	8
Mexico	14
Mozambique	6
Moldova	23,697
Mongolia	30
Nepal	6
Nigeria	128
Niger	2
Netherlands	24
New Zealand	6
Nicaragua	3
Norway	7
United Arab Emirates	3
Abkhazia	324
Pakistan	68
Palestine	89
Panama	2
Peru	25
Poland	163
Rwanda	2
Uruguay	2
Bahrain	1
Romania	35
Oman	2
Saudi Arabia	4
Senegal	8
Burkina Faso	3
Serbia	566
Singapore	1
Syria	1,270
Slovakia	10
Slovenia	19
United States	388
Sudan	35
Tajikistan	103,681
Thailand	33
Taiwan	1
Togo	1
Tunisia	122
Turkmenistan	3,628
Turkey	1,388
Uganda	3
Uzbekistan	31,867
Ukraine	375,989
Philippines	19
Finland	24
France	167
Croatia	54
Chad	5
Montenegro	56
Czech Republic	39
Chile	10
Switzerland	21
Sweden	32
Sri Lanka	11
Ecuador	19
Estonia	153
Ethiopia	5
South Africa	12
Japan	3
Stateless persons	6,118
Total	735,385

== See also ==
- Opposition to immigration
- Remigration
- Demographics of Russia
- Illegal immigration to Russia
- Visa policy of Russia
