= Illegal immigration to Russia =

Illegal immigration to Russia has been ongoing.

In 2012, the Russian Federal Security Service's Border Service stated there had been an increase in illegal migration from former Soviet states, such as Georgia, Ukraine and Moldova. Under legal changes made in 2012, illegal immigrants who are caught will be banned from reentering the country for ten years.

In 2021, according to Russian Deputy Interior Minister Aleksandr Gorovoy, there are more than 1 million illegal immigrants from CIS countries currently living in Russia.

According to Interior Ministry data, more than 332,000 illegal migrants from Uzbekistan currently reside in Russia, along with 247,000 from Tajikistan, 152,000 from Ukraine, 120,000 from Azerbaijan, 115,000 from Kyrgyzstan, 61,000 from Armenia, 56,000 from Moldova and 49,000 from Kazakhstan.

An organization opposed to illegal immigration called Movement Against Illegal Immigration was active in Russia from 2002 until 2011, when it was banned.

Due to Russia's declining population, and the low birth rates and high death rates of Russian citizens, the Russian government has tried to increase immigration to the country in the last decade; which has led to millions of migrants flow into Russia from mainly post-Soviet states, many of whom are illegal and remain undocumented.

In 2024, at least 80,000 illegal migrants were deported from Russia, a rise from 44,200 deportations in 2023. At least 23,000 were deported from the Moscow area in 2024.

Between June and October 2025, Russian authorities launched the 'Nelegal' operation, in which 19,000 illegal migrants were deported from Russia and 4,800 criminal cases were initiated on charges related to the organization of illegal migration, and about 1,500 additional cases were filed for other offenses, including the illegal trafficking of drugs and weapons, illegal border crossings, and crimes related to terrorism and extremism.

Between January 2025 and January 2026, amid new migration legislation, a 10% reduction in the number of foreigners living in Russia was shown. In 2026, the foreign population in Russia was shown at 5.7 million down from 6.3 million the year before.

Read more: https://asiaplus.news/en/2025/11/20/over-19000-migrants-deported-from-russia-in-2025-as-part-of-nelegal-operation/

== See also ==
- Demographics of Russia
- Immigration to Russia
- Immigration to the Soviet Union
- List of countries by foreign-born population
- List of sovereign states and dependent territories by fertility rate
