= Andrei Kurnosenko =

- Андрей Курносенко
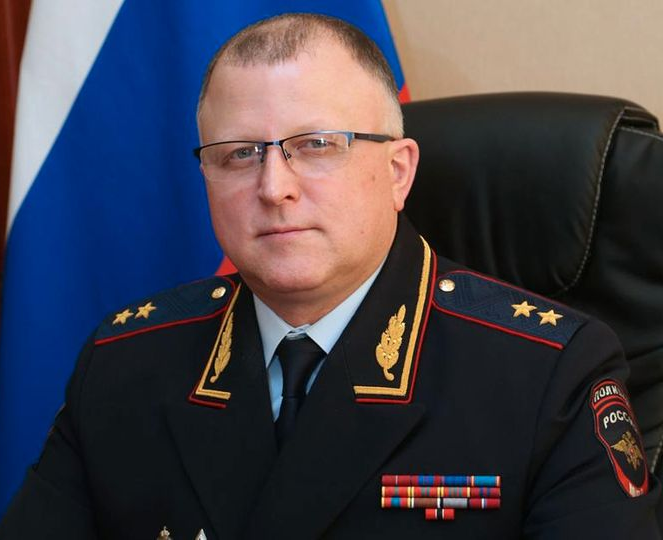
- Kurnosenko in 2026

First Deputy Minister of Internal Affairs
- Incumbent
- Assumed office 12 March 2026
- Preceded by: Aleksandr Gorovoy

Personal details
- Born: 17 July 1969 (age 57) Sevastopol, USSR
- Education: Nakhimov Black Sea Higher Naval School; Russian State Social University

Military service
- Allegiance: Russia
- Branch/service: Ministry of Internal Affairs
- Rank: Lieutenant general
- Commands: Main Directorate for Economic Security and Corruption Prevention

Andrei Anatolyevich Kurnosenko (Russian: Андрей Анатольевич Курносенко; born July 17, 1969, Sevastopol, USSR) is a Russian politician and police lieutenant general (2019). He serves as First Deputy Minister of Internal Affairs of the Russian Federation since March 12, 2026, and as Head of the Main Directorate for Economic Security and Corruption Prevention of the Ministry of Internal Affairs of Russia from 2015 to 2026.

== Biography ==
He was born July 17, 1969, in Sevastopol. His father, Anatoly Vasilyevich Kurnosenko, is a retired captain of the first rank. He graduated from the Nakhimov Black Sea Higher Naval School. He served in the Navy for four years and rose to the rank of lieutenant commander. He later moved to Moscow, where his parents were already living. He joined the internal affairs agencies in 1995, beginning his service as an operative in the Regional Directorate for Organized Crime at the Moscow City Police. In 2001, he graduated from the Moscow State Social University (now the Russian State Social University) with a degree in jurisprudence. Since October 2006, he has served in the Main Directorate of Internal Security of the Ministry of Internal Affairs of Russia. In December 2012, he was appointed Deputy Minister of Internal Affairs for the Republic of Bashkortostan.и

From 2014 to 2015, he served as Deputy and First Deputy Chief of the Main Directorate for Economic Security and Corruption Prevention. By decree of the President of Russia dated December 23, 2015, he was appointed head of this directorate. Amid the corruption scandal surrounding Police Colonel Dmitry Zakharchenko, the acting head of Directorate "T" of the Main Directorate for Economic Security and Corruption Prevention, Kurnosenko was warned of incomplete professional compliance in September 2016 for "failure to take appropriate measures to strengthen service discipline and the rule of law in the unit entrusted to him".

By decree of the President of Russia dated February 22, 2019, Kurnosenko was awarded the rank of Lieutenant General of Police. In accordance with presidential decree dated March 12, 2026, he was appointed to the post of First Deputy Minister of Internal Affairs of the Russian Federation, replacing Colonel General of Police Aleksandr Gorovoy.
