= FSB Criminalistics Institute =

Division of the Federal Security Service of the Russian Federation

- Institute of Criminalistics of the Centre for Special Technology of the Federal Security Service of the Russian Federation
- Институт криминалистики ФСБ
- Abbreviation: NII-2 FSB
- Formation: 1977; 49 years ago
- Type: Governmental
- Headquarters: Teplostansky passage, 1
- Location: Moscow, Russia
- Services: polygraph testing, recognition of people or their individual characteristics using biometric data, linguistic expertise, analysis of chemicals (including detection of trace amounts of drugs and poisons), robotic mine clearance and others
- Director: Stanislav Makshakov
- Parent organization: Centre for special technology of the FSB of the Russian Federation
- Formerly called: Central Research Institute of the KGB of the USSR

The FSB Criminalistics Institute, also the Institute of Criminalistics of the Centre for Special Technology of the Federal Security Service of the Russian Federation, (Note: NII-2 FSB, military unit 34435; earlier — Central Research Institute of the KGB of the USSR (Central Research Institute of the KGB of the USSR), Research Institute No. 2 of the KGB of the USSR (Research Institute-2 of the KGB of the USSR)) is a division of the Federal Security Service (FSB) of the Russian Federation. The institute provides a variety of services, including polygraph testing, recognition of people or their individual characteristics using biometric data, linguistic expertise, analysis of chemicals (including detection of trace amounts of drugs and poisons), and robotic mine clearance, among others.

== History ==
The Central Research Institute of the KGB of the USSR (now the Criminalistics Institute as part of the Centre for special technology of the FSB of the Russian Federation) was established in 1977 to perform the functions of a high-tech investigative unit.

The polygraph laboratory, established in 1975 at the KGB of the USSR, was incorporated into the Institute in 1994 as its department. Since the spring of 1996, the Institute has been running courses for polygraph examiners led by the head of this department.

During the 1991 Soviet coup attempt, one of the premises of the Operations Centre of the Criminalistics Institute was used by the putschists as a command centre.

The Criminalistics Institute took part in the investigation of high-profile terrorist acts and accidents: the Russian apartment bombings in 1999, the sinking of the Russian submarine Kursk (K-141) in 2000, the Moscow theatre hostage crisis in 2002, the Beslan school siege in 2004 and others.

== Activities ==
The Criminalistics Institute has been and remains a secret institution since its inception. Divisions of the Institute are located in several places in Moscow, Russia and the Moscow region: a complex of buildings in Moscow at the intersection of Teplostanskiy proezd and Akademika Vargi street (address: Teplostanskiy proezd, 1); complex of buildings in the village of Podlipki.

In Soviet times, the "Criminalistics laboratory of military unit 34435" made secret forensic suitcases. One of the activities of the organization in Soviet times was the production of poisons and means of their covert use. One of the Institute's divisions is still working with poisons.

In modern Russia, the FSB Criminalistics Institute conducts forensic, linguistic and other examinations, among other things

Russian journalist Ilya Barabanov claimed that polonium was stored in the Institute, which was later used to poison former FSB officer Alexander Litvinenko.

External videos
- Дело раскрыто. Я знаю всех, кто пытался меня убить (The case has been solved. I know everyone who tried to kill me) with official English subtitles

In December 2020, a joint investigation by Bellingcat and The Insider, with the participation of Der Spiegel, CNN and the Anti-Corruption Foundation, concluded that the Institute's employees are working with chemical weapon, in particular, with a Novichok agent. The same investigative group reported that a team of FSB operatives worked under the cover of the Institute, which organized the assassination attempt on Russian opposition leader Alexei Navalny in Tomsk, and that this team operated under the leadership of Stanislav Makshakov, deputy head of the FSB Criminalistics Institute.

In January 2021, another investigation by Bellingcat and The Insider, with the participation of Der Spiegel, was published, in which it was alleged that a team of FSB officers involved in the poisoning of Alexei Navalny was also involved in the murder of journalist Timur Kuashev in 2014, public figure Ruslan Magomedragimov in 2015 year and the leader of the New Russia movement Nikita Isaev in 2019.

== Personalities ==
- Kirill Yurievich Vasiliev (general, chemical engineer) is the director of the Criminalistics Institute.
- Stanislav Valentinovich Makshakov (colonel, Candidate of Medical Sciences) — deputy director of the Criminalistics Institute for Science.
- Vladimir Mikhailovich Bogdanov (major general) was the head of the Institute until Kirill Vasiliev (now he heads the higher organization Centre for special technology of the FSB and holds the position of deputy director of the scientific and technical service of the FSB).
- Anatoly Vladimirovich Fesenko (doctor of technical sciences) — former head of the Institute (1996—2006).

== See also ==
- Poison laboratory of the Soviet secret services
