= Aleksandr Gorovoy =

Russian politician (born 1960)

- Александр Горовой
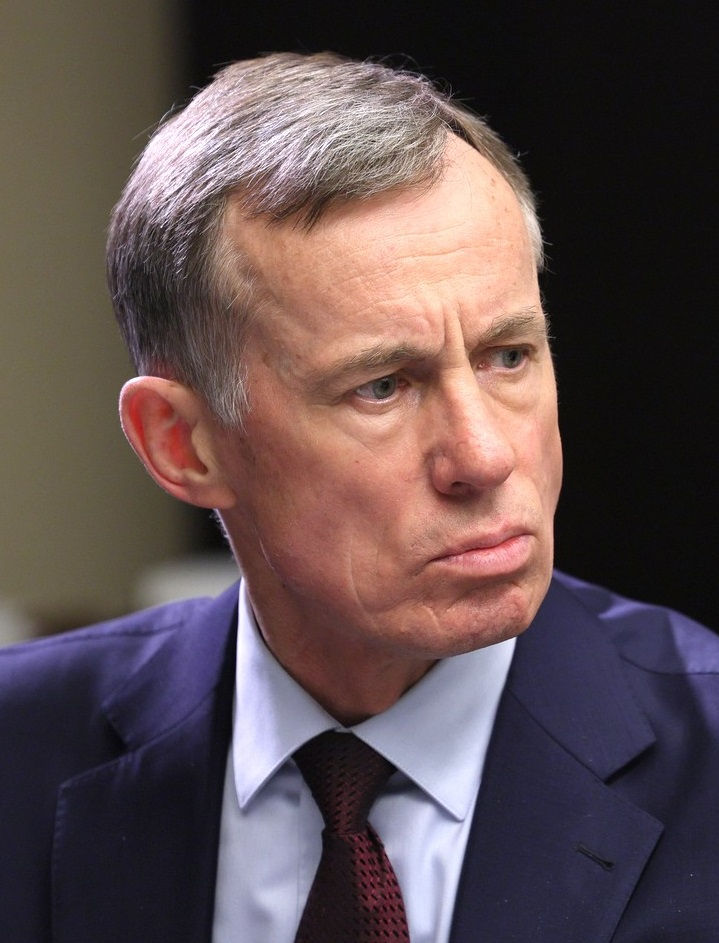
- Gorovoy in 2023

First Deputy Minister of Internal Affairs
- In office 11 June 2011 – 12 March 2026
- Preceded by: Mikhail Sukhodolsky
- Succeeded by: Andrei Kurnosenko

Personal details
- Born: 20 June 1948 (age 78) Tolstikhino, Krasnoyarsk Krai, USSR
- Education: Krasnoyarsk Polytechnic Institute; Moscow MVD Academy

Military service
- Allegiance: Soviet Union; Russia
- Branch/service: Ministry of Internal Affairs
- Years of service: 1982-2026
- Rank: Major-general

Aleksandr Vladimirovich Gorovoy (Russian: Александр Владимирович Горовой; born July 31, 1960, in the village of Tolstikhino, Uyarsky District, Krasnoyarsk Krai, RSFSR, USSR) is a Russian politician and lawyer. He served as First Deputy Minister of Internal Affairs of the Russian Federation from June 11, 2011 to March 12, 2026. He holds the rank of Colonel General of Police (2013).

== Biography ==
He was born on July 31, 1960, in the village of Tolstikhin, Uyarsky District, Krasnoyarsk Krai, to a family of civil servants.

In 1982, he graduated from the Krasnoyarsk Polytechnic Institute with a degree in automotive and automotive industry mechanical engineering.

From October 1982, Gorovoy worked in the internal affairs agencies of the Soviet Ministry of Internal Affairs, beginning as a police officer in the Artemovsk police department in Krasnoyarsk Krai. In 1983, he was transferred to the position of traffic police inspector in the Kuraginsky District Department of Internal Affairs in Krasnoyarsk Krai. In 1987, he was appointed Chief of the State Traffic Inspectorate and continued his service until 1990. Soon after, he was appointed Deputy Chief of Prevention for the Kuraginsky District Department of Internal Affairs.

In 1991, Gorovoy was seconded to full-time study at the Moscow Academy of the Ministry of Internal Affairs, from which he graduated with honors in 1994. After graduating from the Academy, he was appointed Deputy Chief of the Sverdlovsk District Department of Internal Affairs in Krasnoyarsk and Chief of Public Safety Police.

In 1997, Gorovoy was transferred to the position of Chief of the Krasnoyarsk City Department of Internal Affairs.

In December 2002, Gorovoy was appointed Deputy Chief of the Main Directorate of Internal Affairs for Krasnoyarsk Krai and Chief of Public Safety Police, and in February 2005, he was appointed Chief of the Main Directorate of Internal Affairs for Krasnoyarsk Krai.

By decree of the President of the Russian Federation dated February 23, 2006, Gorovoy was awarded the special rank of "Major General of Police".

On October 23, 2010, he was appointed Chief of the Main Directorate of Internal Affairs for Stavropol Krai, and on March 29, 2011, he was appointed Chief of the Main Directorate of the Ministry of Internal Affairs of Russia for Stavropol Krai.

By decree of the President of the Russian Federation dated March 29, 2011, Gorovoy was awarded the special rank of "Lieutenant General of Police."

On June 11, 2011, by decree of Russian President Dmitry Medvedev, Gorovoy was appointed First Deputy Minister of Internal Affairs of the Russian Federation. Since April 2016, he has overseen migration issues.

In accordance with a decree of the President of Russia dated June 12, 2013, Gorovoy was awarded the special rank of "Colonel General of Police".

Gorovoy has repeatedly traveled on official business trips to the North Caucasus region to carry out special assignments.

On March 12, 2026, he was relieved of his post as First Deputy Minister of Internal Affairs of Russia due to reaching the age limit for service in the internal affairs agencies.

== Awards ==
- Order "For Merit to the Fatherland", 2nd Class (2014)
- Order "For Merit to the Fatherland", 3rd Class
- Order "For Merit to the Fatherland", 4th Class
- Order of Alexander Nevsky (2018)
- Medal of the Order "For Merit to the Fatherland", 1st Class (2010)
- Medal of the Order "For Merit to the Fatherland", 2nd Class (2002)
- Badge of Honorary Employee of the Ministry of Internal Affairs
- Breastplate "For Distinguished Service in the Ministry of Internal Affairs," 1st Class
- Medal "For Impeccable Service", 3rd Class
- Medal "For Distinction in Service", 1st Class
- Medal "For Valor in Service"
- Medal "For Merit in Management Activity"
- Personalized weapon - Makarov pistol
- Paralympic Order (2014)
- Gorovoy was included on the honor board of the Ministry of Internal Affairs of Russia.
