= Sergei Kanev =

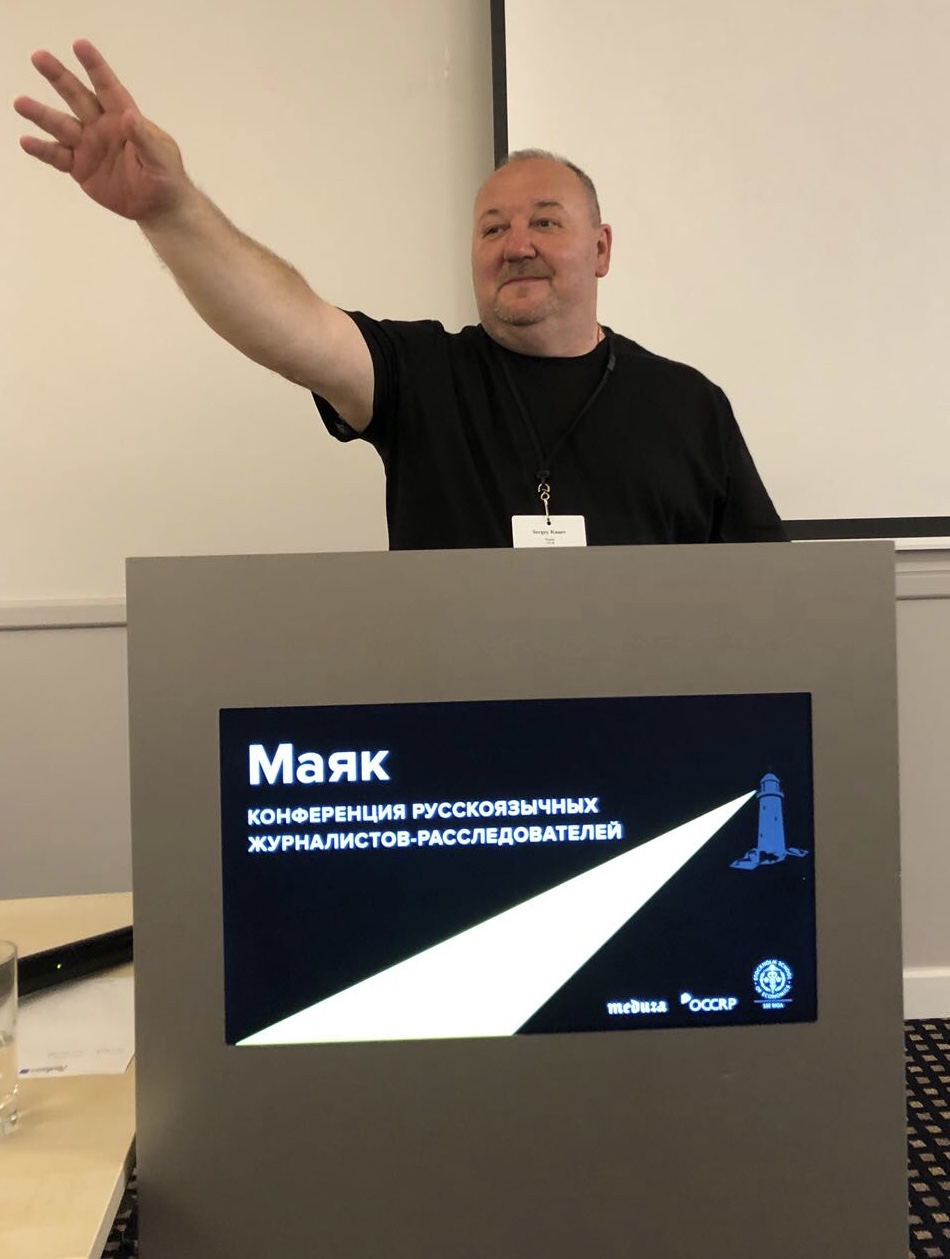
Sergei Kanev at the Mayak Conference for Investigative Journalists, Riga, 2018

Sergei Kanev (Russian: Сергей Канев; born December 30, 1962, Moscow) is a Russian journalist internationally known for his coverage of crime and police corruption.

== Journalistic career ==
Kanev began a career as a pop music disc jockey in the 1990s but decided to try crime journalism for a late-night television program following violent attacks in his disco.

Becoming increasingly critical of the authorities, he was fired in 2005 by a state-owned broadcaster and joined Novaya Gazeta, known for its anti-establishment approach to investigative journalism. His aggressive coverage of crime and corruption has led to numerous physical attacks, including an attempt to strangle him with wire.

Yulia Latynina, a Novaya Gazeta columnist who has since left Russia after an apparent attempt on her life, once stated, "The most dangerous thing right now is not to criticize the authorities. It’s to criticize people who can kill you. The people Kanev writes about can kill. That is his problem."

In 2011, the Financial Times named Kanev one of "25 Russians to Watch", stating, "Investigative crime reporter for Novaya Gazeta, Kanev has made his reputation reporting on police corruption. He has become an unlikely hero to many police officers (‘the ones without the villas’, says a source) who want to see law enforcement cleaned up in Russia."

In 2012, he accepted the position of editor in chief at a suburban Moscow newspaper called Read All (Читают Все), in the town of Chekhov, whose proprietor had ambitious plans for anti-corruption investigations. In 2013, the newspaper published an exposé detailing allegations of corruption in a government-owned medical supply company called Medproektremstroy, which represented the Moscow city government in hospital supply contracting. The company sued both the proprietor, Oleg Strekalov, and Kanev, but its claims against the two were denied.

In March 2013, Kanev published an article talking about the favourable treatment from the Russian authorities handed out to Chechen policemen who in 2011 kidnapped and tortured a man in an extortion attempt. The investigator heading up this case was fired and the case was closed and the Chechen policeman were released.

In 2016, he wrote an article about President Putin's eldest daughter Maria Vorontsova and her private life. She uses different names, has lived in many different countries and the article points to a life of luxury while many Russians are living on the poverty line, which contradicts official reports stating that the family live like normal Russians, use public transport, etc.

In 2018, RFE/RL quoted Kanev,"There are a load of my investigations that have angered certain high-ranking officials."

Also Crimerussia.com state that: "Media sources have already reported that a provocation is being prepared against one of the journalists that investigated into the Skripals’ poisoners, aimed at accusing him of organizing an act of terrorism against the country president. The owner of the Center for Investigation Management Khodorkovsky also said this, noting that one of the Center’s employees had to leave Russia. According to Ekho Moskvy, Kanev was afraid of being charged by the Russian authorities in revenge for carrying out a journalistic investigation."

In September 2018 Kanev left the country fearing possible prosecution for his work. Allegedly, Kanev is now in the Baltics.

== Awards ==
Kanev was honored by the Russian Ministry of Interior in 2001 for the detention of a criminal. He received an award in 2009 from the Artem Borovik Foundation. In 2010, he was awarded a commemorative medal by the Union of Journalists of the Russian Federation.

== Personal life ==
Kanev's own life has been visited by tragedy. His wife died in 2006. Their son, Ivan, 25, died 8 March 2011 from apparent tropicamide abuse. Their daughter, Katya, 23, died 40 days later, 23 of April 2011 after being struck by her boyfriend.
