= Federal Migration Service =

Authority in Russia

Federal Migration Service of the Russian Government FMS of Russia Федеральная миграционная служба, ФМС России
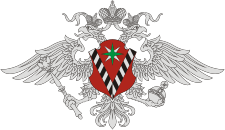
- Emblem of Federal Migratory Service

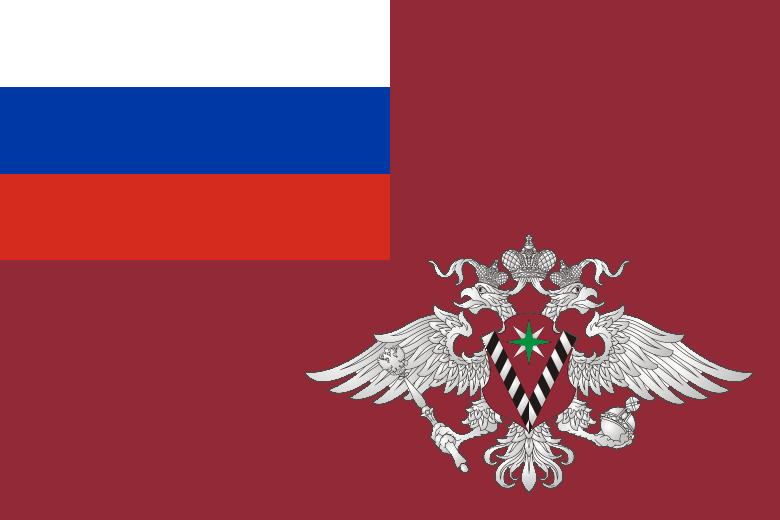
- Flag of Federal Migratory Service
- Abbreviation: FMS

Agency overview
- Formed: 14 June 1992
- Preceding agencies: OVIR, Department of Visas and Immigration; Passports and Visas Service of MVD Migration Committee
- Dissolved: 5 April 2016
- Superseding agency: Main Directorate for Migration Affairs

Jurisdictional structure
- Operations jurisdiction: RUS
- Governing body: Government of Russia
- General nature: Civilian police

Operational structure
- Headquarters: Upper Radishchevskaya Street 4 D. str. 1, Tagansky District in Moscow, Russia
- Elected officer responsible: Dmitry Medvedev, Prime Minister of Russia
- Agency executive: Konstantin Romodanovsky, Director
- Parent agency: Government of Russia
- Child agency: Immigration Control Directorate

Notables
- Anniversary: June 14

Website
- http://www.fms.gov.ru/

The Federal Migration Service (Федеральная миграционная служба, ФМС России) was a federal law enforcement agency of Russia responsible for implementing the state policy on migration and also performing law enforcement functions, functions for control, supervision, and provision of public services in the field of migration. The Federal Migration Service was responsible for the issuing of Russian international passports, resident registration and immigration control in Russia. Headquartered in Moscow, the FMS was charged with the investigation and enforcement of over 500 federal statutes within the Russian Federation. The FMS was led by a Director who is appointed by the Prime Minister of Russia.

The FMS was one of the largest investigative agencies in the Russian government, following the Federal Security Service of the Russian Federation, Investigative Committee of Russia and the FSKN.

The Russian Federal Migration Service was created on June 14, 1992, replacing the Migration Committee of the Ministry of Labor and Employment. The service was established on the basis of Governmental Decree No. 740 from September 22, 1992.

On April 5, 2016, the FMS was dissolved, and its functions and authorities were transferred to the Main Directorate for Migration Affairs, part of the Ministry of Internal Affairs (MVD).

== History ==
The Russian Federal Migration Service was created on June 14, 1992, replacing the Migration Committee of the Ministry of Labor and Employment.

In 1999, President of Russia Boris Yeltsin signed a decree to dissolve the FMS and reestablish it as Ministry for Federation Affairs, Nationalities and Migration Policy.

In 2001, the Ministry was dissolved and its functions were transferred to the MVD.

On February 23, 2002, President Putin organized the establishment of the Department for Migration Affairs under the MVD.

On July 19, 2004, President Putin signed a decree to re-establish the Federal Migration Service. The service was reorganized in its current form by Presidential Decree No. 928 of July 19, 2004 "Issues of the Federal Migration Service".

The territorial organs of the FMS of Russia were established on January 1, 2006, bringing together the Passport and Visa Service and the Immigration Division of the Ministry of Internal Affairs.

Until 2012, the service was under the jurisdiction of the MVD. From 2012 til 2016, FMS was under direct subordinate of the Russian Government.

== Structure ==
- Law Directorate
- Directorate for Analytic organization
- Directorate for Immigration Control (Управление иммиграционного контроля)
- Directorate for Citizenship Affairs
- Office for immigrants
- Directorate for the organization of visas and registration
- Directorate of external labor migration
- Directorate for the organization of passports and registration of public accounting
- Department of International and Public Affairs
- Directorate of Compatriots Affairs
- Inspection and Accountability Office
- Financial and Economic Affairs
- Department of organizing activities for mobilization training
- Center for citizens, passport and visa issues
- Center for Logistics
- Information Center
- Centers for temporary accommodation of displaced persons
- Centers for Medical and psychological rehabilitation of displaced persons
- Department for Base material and technical resources
- Center for temporary accommodation of immigrants
- Training Center
- Federal State Institution "Center for the detention of persons subject to readmission"

== Professional holiday ==
Since 2007, June 14 is the official Day of the worker of the Migration Service in the Russian Federation.

== Directors of the Federal Migration Service ==
No.	Director	Term of Office	President(s) served under
1.	Tatyana Regent	July 1992 - February 1999	Boris Yeltsin
2.	Andrey Chernenko	3 June 2004 — July 20, 2005	Vladimir Putin
2.	Konstantin Romodanovsky	July 20, 2005 — April 5, 2016	Vladimir Putin; Dmitry Medvedev

== See also ==
- Federal crime
- U.S. Immigration and Customs Enforcement
- Federal Security Service of the Russian Federation
- Federal Customs Service of Russia
