= Alcohol in Russia =

Disability-adjusted life year for alcohol use disorders per 100,000 inhabitants in 2004. Russia was significantly higher than all other countries. no data <50 50–170 170–290 290–410 410–530 530–650 650–770 770–890 890–1010 1010–1130 1130–1250 >1250

Alcohol has been a major health concern in Russia, especially for men of working age. Excessive alcohol use has caused many early deaths. Alcoholism in Russia, according to some authors, has reached the level of a national disaster and a humanitarian catastrophe. Starting in the early 2000s, Russia has implemented a variety of anti-alcoholism measures, such as banning sales at night, raising taxes, and banning the advertising of alcohol. These policies have resulted in a considerable fall of alcohol consumption to levels comparable with European Union averages.

== History ==
Alcoholism has been a problem throughout the country's history because drinking is a pervasive, socially acceptable behaviour in Russian society. Alcohol has also been a significant source of government revenue for centuries.

=== Early history ===
According to Russian legend, one of the main reasons that the 10th-century Kievan prince Vladimir the Great rejected Islam is because of Islam's prohibition of drinking alcohol. He is purportedly quoted stating:

Drinking is the joy of all Rus'. We cannot exist without its pleasure.

In the 1540s, Ivan the Terrible began setting up kabaks (Russian: кабак) or taverns in his major cities to help fill his coffers, and a third of Russian men were in debt to the kabaks by 1648. By 1859, vodka, the national drink, was the source of more than 40% of the government's revenue.

=== 20th century ===
In 1909, the average alcohol consumption was said to be 11 bottles per capita per year. An estimated 4% of the population of St. Petersburg were alcoholics in 1913.

At the beginning of World War I, prohibition was introduced in the Russian Empire, limiting the sale of hard liquor to restaurants.

After the Bolshevik Party came to power, they made repeated attempts to reduce consumption in the Soviet Union. However, by 1925, vodka had reappeared in state-run stores. Joseph Stalin reestablished a state monopoly to generate revenue. Alcohol-related taxes constituted one-third of government revenues by the 1970s.

Prophylactoriums, medical treatment centres, were established in 1925 to treat alcoholics and prostitutes. By 1929, there were five in Moscow. Chronic alcoholics evading treatment were detained for up to two years.

From the 1930s and 1940s until the mid-1980s, the primary treatment for alcoholism in Russia was conditioned response therapy, but this has since fallen out of favour.

In the early 1980s, an estimated "two-thirds of murders and violent crimes were committed by intoxicated persons; and drunk drivers were responsible for 14,000 traffic deaths and 60,000 serious traffic injuries". Soviet leaders Nikita Khrushchev, Leonid Brezhnev, Yuri Andropov, and Konstantin Chernenko all tried to stem alcoholism.

In 1985, it was estimated that alcoholism resulted in $8 billion in lost production. Mikhail Gorbachev attempted to impose a partial prohibition campaign, which involved a massive anti-alcohol campaign, severe penalties against public drunkenness and alcohol consumption, and restrictions on sales of liquor. The campaign temporarily succeeded in reducing per capita alcohol consumption and improving quality-of-life measures such as life expectancies and crime rates, but it ultimately failed due to its deep unpopularity.

In 1995, about three-quarters of those arrested for homicide were under the influence of alcohol, and 29% of respondents reported that children beaten within families were the victims of drunks and alcoholics. A 1997 report published in the Journal of Family Violence found that among men who killed their wives, 60–75% of offenders had been drinking before the incident.

=== Alcohol prevention policies in the 21st century ===
In the 1990s and early 2000s, Russia was one of the top alcohol-drinking countries in the world. A study by Russian, British, and French researchers published in The Lancet scrutinized deaths between 1990 and 2001 of residents of three Siberian industrial towns with typical mortality rates and determined that 52% of deaths of people between the ages of 15 and 54 were the result of complications of alcohol use disorder. Lead researcher Professor David Zaridze estimated that the increase in alcohol consumption since 1987 has caused an additional three million deaths nationwide. Men were particularly hit hard: according to a U.N. National Human Development Report, Russian males born in 2006 had a life expectancy of just over 60 years, or 17 years fewer than Western Europeans, while Russian females could expect to live 13 years longer than their male counterparts.

After 2003, alcohol use in Russia began to drop as public opinion and government policy changed. For example, in 2007, Gennadi Onishenko, the country's chief public health official, voiced his concern over the nearly threefold rise in alcohol consumption over the past 16 years. Between 2003 and 2018, the number of deaths from all causes dropped by about 39% for men and 36% for women. Life expectancy also improved, reaching nearly 68 years for men and 78 years for women in 2018.

In 2010, Russian President Dmitry Medvedev nearly doubled the minimum price of a bottle of vodka to combat the problem.

In 2012, a national ban on sales of all types of alcoholic beverages from 11 p.m. to 8 a.m. was introduced to complement regional bans.

The Russian government has proposed reducing the state minimum vodka price in reaction to the 2014–15 Russian financial crisis.

In December 2016, 78 people in Irkutsk died in a mass methanol poisoning. Medvedev reacted by calling for a ban on non-traditional alcoholic liquids like the bath lotion involved in this case, stating that "it's an outrage, and we need to put an end to this".

In 2020 officials discussed raising the legal drinking age from 18 to 21.

In October 2019, the World Health Organization announced that Russia is experiencing a decline in alcohol consumption among its citizens and a rapid increase in life expectancy as a result. Per capita consumption of pure ethanol, which was around 11–12 liters annually in the early 2000s—one of the highest rates globally—fell by 43% between 2006 and 2016. This reduction since 2003 has significantly contributed to lowering mortality rates, with deaths from all causes dropping by 39% for men and 36% for women between 2003 and 2018. According to the WHO report, male life expectancy increased from 57 years in the 1990s to 68 years, and female life expectancy reached 78 years, due to reduced alcohol consumption. Russian Health Minister Veronika Skvortsova confirmed in 2018 that per capita alcohol consumption had decreased by 80%, while the number of people exercising regularly increased by over 40%, thanks to government policies combating alcohol addiction.

== Alcohol control ==
The main issue with Russian alcohol consumption patterns was the high consumption of spirits (such as vodka). High volumes of alcohol consumption had serious negative effects on Russia's social fabric and brought political, economic and public health ramifications. It was repeatedly listed as a major national problem. Studies showed that alcohol was a leading cause of death, especially for working-age men. In some cases, half of the men in this age group died because of alcohol-related problems.

To combat this, Russia raised taxes on alcohol, especially for vodka, using a minimum unit tax. Russia also introduced new laws restricting when and where alcohol could be sold. These policies have resulted in a considerable fall of alcohol consumption volumes. According to a 2011 report by the World Health Organization, annual per capita consumption of alcohol in Russia was about 15.76 litres of pure alcohol, the fourth-highest volume in Europe. It dropped to 13.5 litres by 2013 and 11.7 litres in 2016, dropping further to about 10.5 litres in 2019. with wine and beer overtaking spirits as the main source of beverage alcohol. These levels are comparable with European Union averages. Alcohol-related deaths in Russia have dropped dramatically year over year falling to 6,789 in 2017 from 28,386 in 2006 and continuing to decline into 2018. However, binge drinking levels remain elevated compared to other countries in the WHO Eastern European Region.

Another issue was illegal and homemade alcohol. The falling legal consumption was accompanied by growth in sales of illegally produced drink. In 2006, Russia introduced a new alcohol excise stamp known as EGAIS, identifying every bottle sold in Russia through a centralized data system.

Russia also systematically controlled information regarding alcohol. Alcohol advertisements were banned on TV, radio, and other public platforms to reduce exposure, especially for young people. Public health campaigns encouraged people to drink less and adopt healthier lifestyles. Doctors were also trained to help people struggling with alcohol addiction.

== Treatment ==
The modern mainstream treatment for alcoholism involves detailed analyses of each patient, and may include pharmacotherapy, medicinal treatment, psychotherapy, sociotherapy, and other support. Alcoholics Anonymous exists in Russia, but is generally dismissed by the Russian population. Disulfiram has also seen widespread use.

One alternative therapy for alcoholism that has been used in Russia is the practice of "coding", in which therapists pretend to insert a "code" into patients' brains with the ostensible effect that drinking even small amounts of alcohol will be extremely harmful or even lethal. Despite not being recommended in Russian clinical guidelines, it has enjoyed considerable popularity. In recent years its use has lessened, due to the spread of information about its ineffectiveness.

== See also ==
- Russian Cross
- Vodka Belt
- List of federal subjects of Russia by incidence of substance abuse
- List of countries by alcohol consumption per capita
- Suicide in Russia
- Crime in Russia
- Domestic violence in Russia
