= Health in Russia =

Health in Russia deteriorated rapidly following the dissolution of the Soviet Union, and particularly for men, as a result of social and economic changes.

The Human Rights Measurement Initiative finds that Russia is able to fulfil 78.0% of the requirements for basic health, in relation to Russian income levels.

== Life expectancy ==
Life expectancy in Russia since 1896

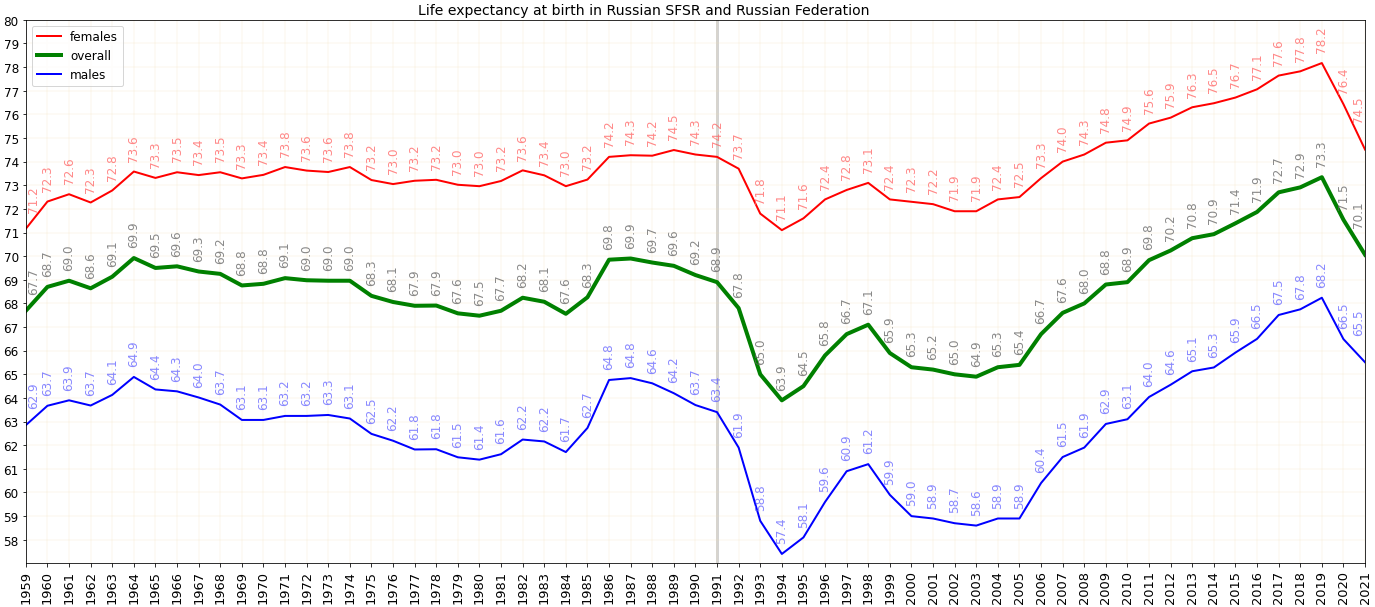
Life expectancy at birth in Russia

=== Pre-Soviet era ===
Before the revolution, Russia's annual mortality rate was 29.4 per 1,000 people, and infant mortality was 260 per 1000 births. In 1915 life expectancy at birth was 34 years. The cholera epidemic of 1910 killed 100,000 people. A typhus epidemic between 1918 and 1922 caused 2.5 million deaths, and doctors were particularly affected. There was an outbreak of malaria in 1920. The Institute of Tropical Medicine in Moscow instituted a programme of registration of cases and free distribution of quinine. The famine of 1921-1922 caused widespread starvation. As many as 27 million people were affected. Another cholera outbreak between 1921 and 1923 caused an estimated 13 million deaths. By 1926 life expectancy had reached 31 years.

=== Post-Soviet era ===
As of 2013, the average life expectancy in Russia was 65.1 years for males and 76.5 years for females. The average Russian life expectancy of 71.6 years at birth is nearly 5 years shorter than the overall average figure for the European Union or the United States.

The biggest factor contributing to this relatively low life expectancy for males is a high mortality rate among working-age males from preventable causes (e.g., alcohol poisoning, stress, smoking, traffic accidents, violent crimes). Mortality among Russian men has risen by 60% since 1991, four to five times higher than the European average.

As a result of the large difference in life expectancy between men and women (the greatest in the world), the gender imbalance remains to this day and there are 0.859 males for every female in Russia.

== Major health issues ==
=== Common causes of death ===
In 2008, 1,185,993, or 57% of all deaths in Russia were caused by cardiovascular disease. The second leading cause of death was cancer which claimed 289,257 lives (14%). External causes of death such as suicide (1.8%), road accidents (1.7%), murders (1.1%), accidental alcohol poisoning (1.1%), and accidental drowning (0.5%), claimed 244,463 lives in total (11%). Other major causes of death were diseases of the digestive system (4.3%), respiratory disease (3.8%), infectious and parasitic diseases (1.6%), and tuberculosis (1.2%).

The infant mortality rate in 2008 was 8.5 deaths per 1,000, down from 9.6 in 2007. Since the Soviet collapse, there has been a dramatic rise in both cases of and deaths from tuberculosis, with the disease being particularly widespread amongst prison inmates.

=== Smoking ===
Until 2007, Russia was the world leader in smoking. According to a survey reported in 2010 by Russia’s Health and Social Development Ministry, 43.9 million adults in Russia are smokers. Among Russians aged 19 to 44 years, 7 in 10 men smoke and 4 in 10 women smoke. It is estimated that 330,000-400,000 people die in Russia each year due to smoking-related diseases. A smoking ban was introduced in 2014.

=== Alcohol consumption ===
Alcohol consumption and alcoholism are major problems in Russia. It is estimated that Russians drink 15 litres (26 pints) of pure alcohol each year. This number is nearly 3 times as much as it was in 1990. It has even been reported that excessive alcohol consumption is to blame for nearly half of all premature deaths in Russia.

A recent study blamed alcohol for more than half the deaths (52%) among Russians aged 15 to 54 from 1990 to 2001. For the same demographic, this compares to 4% of deaths for the rest of the world.

=== HIV/AIDS ===
HIV/AIDS, virtually non-existent in the Soviet era, rapidly spread following the collapse, mainly through the explosive growth of intravenous drug use. According to a 2008 report by UNAIDS, the HIV epidemic in Russia continues to grow, but at a slower pace than in the late 1990s. At the end of December 2007 the number of registered HIV cases in Russia was 416,113, with 42,770 new registered cases that year. The actual number of people living with HIV in Russia is estimated to be about 940,000. In 2007, 83% of HIV infections in Russia were registered among injecting drug users, 6% among sex workers, and 5% among prisoners. However, there is clear evidence of a significant rise in heterosexual transmission. In 2007, 93.19% of adults and children with advanced HIV infection were receiving antiretroviral therapy.

In April 2006, the State Council met with the Russian president to set goals for developing a strategy for responding to AIDS. This involved improving coordination, through the creation of a high-level multisectoral governmental commission on AIDS; and establishing a unified monitoring and evaluation system. A new Federal AIDS Program for 2007 - 2011 was also developed and adopted. Federal funding for the national AIDS response in 2006 had increased more than twentyfold compared to 2005, and the 2007 budget doubled that of 2006, adding to the already substantial funds provided by the main donor organizations.

Coordination of activities in responding to AIDS remains a challenge for Russia, despite increased efforts. In 2006, treatment for some patients was interrupted due to delays in tender procedures and unexpected difficulties with customs. Additionally, lack of full commitment to an in-depth program for education on sex and drugs in schools hinders effective prevention programs for children.

=== Suicide ===
In 2008, suicide claimed 38,406 lives in Russia. With a rate of 27.1 suicides per 100,000 people, Russia has one of the highest suicide rates in the world, although it has been steadily decreasing since it peaked at around 40 per 100,000 in the mid-late 90s, including a 30% drop from 2001 to 2006. In 2007 about 22% of all suicides were committed by people aged 40–49, and almost six times as many Russian males commit suicide than females.

Heavy alcohol use is a significant factor in the suicide rate, with an estimated half of all suicides a result of alcohol abuse. This is evidenced by the fact that Russia's suicide rate since the mid-90s has declined alongside per capita alcohol consumption, despite the economic crises since then; alcohol consumption is more of a factor than economic conditions.

=== Tuberculosis ===
The pulmonary TB death rate in Russia around 1900 was 4 per 1000, more than double the rate in London. The All Russia League for the Struggle Against TB was set up in 1909. In 1919 the Commissariat of Public Health established a TB Commission. The incidence of tuberculosis in Moscow was about three times that in London in 1922. The director of the Institute of Control of Serums and Vaccines in Russia, Tarasevich, brought a serum of the BCG vaccine from the Pasteur Institute in 1925 and a vaccination programme started shortly afterwards, starting with children in homes with an active TB patient, but there was initially very low take up. It was not until the 1930s that rates increased significantly.

=== Climate change ===
Climate change has the potential to affect human health in several ways, both directly and indirectly, through for example, extreme heatwaves, fires, floods or insect-borne diseases.

The predicted increases in average annual temperatures in most parts of Russia, especially the western and south-western regions, imply more frequent extreme heatwaves and forest fires. For example, during the heatwave that affected western Russia in 2010, temperatures in Moscow reached 38.2 °C, the highest temperature since records began 130 years ago. In addition, during the heatwave there were 33 consecutive days of temperatures above 30 °C in the city, increasing the incidence of heat-related deaths and health problems, and leading to forest fires. The heatwave and wildfires of 2010 in Russia resulted in around 14,000 heat and air-pollution related deaths, as well as around 25% crop failure that year, more than 10,000 km^{2} of burned area and around 15 billion US dollars of economic losses. Throughout the 21st century, extreme heatwaves such as that of 2010 are likely to occur more often.

In consequence of the 2006, 2003 and 2010 heatwaves in Europe and Russia, the IPCC (2012) has outlined mitigation strategies, including approaches to reduce impacts on public health, assessing heat mortality, communication of risk, education and adapting urban infrastructure to better withstand heatwaves (by for example increasing vegetation cover in cities, increasing albedo in cities and increasing insulation of homes).

With changes in temperature and precipitation patterns as a result of climate change, the distribution and occurrence of various disease-bearing insects will also change. For example, mosquitos carrying malaria are expected to pose an increasing threat in Russia in the 21st century. In the Moscow region, the onset of higher average daily temperatures early on in the year has already led to a rapid increase in malaria cases. This trend is projected to continue, as higher average temperatures extend the range of mosquitos northwards. Similarly, prevalence of tick-borne diseases is also projected to increase in Russia in the 21st century, as a result of climate change and changing distribution range of ticks. Sandfly-borne diseases, such as Leishmaniasis, could also expand in Europe and Russia as a result of climate change and increased average temperatures making transmission suitable in northern latitudes.

Floods may also pose and increased risk as a result of climate change in the 21st century. An average increase in precipitation in many areas of Russia as well as rapid snow and glacier melting due to rising temperatures, can all increase the risk of flooding.

== See also ==
- Healthcare in Russia
- List of federal subjects of Russia by life expectancy
- List of federal subjects of Russia by incidence of substance abuse
