= Domestic violence in Russia =

Domestic violence is a severe issue in Russia. According to Human Rights Watch, citing RIA Novosti, as many as 36,000 women and 26,000 children faced daily abuse at home in 2013. According to official MVD data, in 2015 around 1060 people died of domestic violence in Russia. Of them, 756 were men and 304 women. According to an independent study of 2,200 women in fifty cities and towns in Russia, 70% have experienced at least one form of gender-based violence in the home—physical, psychological, economic, or sexual.

Alcoholism is often a factor, as Russia is one of the hardest drinking nations of the world, taking 26th place by alcohol consumption per capita in 2018.

In January 2017, Russian lawmakers voted, 380–3, to decriminalize certain forms of domestic violence. Under the new law, first-time offenses that do not result in "serious bodily harm" carry a maximum fine of 30,000 rubles, up to 15 days' administrative arrest, or up to 120 hours of community service.

According to recent research commissioned by the State Duma, domestic violence takes place in approximately one out of ten Russian families. Seventy percent of those surveyed report that they have experienced or are experiencing domestic violence: 80% are women, with children and elderly people coming behind. Moreover, in 77% of surveyed cases, physical, psychological and economic violence go together. More than 35% of victims did not go to the police for assistance, citing shame, fear and mistrust.

== Death statistics ==
On October 30, 2019, during the hearings in the Public Chamber of the Russian Federation, with reference to the Ministry of Internal Affairs, the following figures were published: in 2018, 253 women were killed in family conflicts, and in general, over the past decade, this figure was about 300 people annually.

The publication of Moskovsky Komsomolets in December 2019 supplemented the overall picture with the data of the Ministry of Internal Affairs for 2016 and 2017. It also provides figures for the first half of 2019: 233 men and 115 women.

=== Data on annual deaths of 14,000 women ===
At the same time, it is widely said and written that 14,000 women die annually from domestic violence in Russia with a slight difference in wording: according to their different versions, women die at the hands of their husbands, at the hands of lovers, husbands and roommates, etc.

For example, Human Rights Watch report from 1997 cites Ekaterina Lakhova and reports 14,000 killed women. Lt. Gen Mikhail Artamoshkin in a 2008 interview again mentions same number, as does ECHR, which cites Russian non-governmental organization ANNA as do other sources.

==== Origin of the number ====
Marina Pisklakova-Parker, director of the ANNA Center, explained that the 14,000 annual victims (“statistics on the killings of women which many refer to”) is a figure published in 1995 in a report by the Russian Federation that was presented to the UN Committee on the Implementation of the Convention on the Elimination of All Forms of Discrimination against Women. Pisklakova-Parker believes that in 1993 this figure was true.

Alexander Kovalenin, an opponent of the domestic violence law, agrees with Pisklakova-Parker that 14,000 is the figure from 1993, but considers it to be initially incorrect:

"This is the 1993 figure, an estimate of the total number of deliberate killings of women (not only in the family), inserted by someone from the Ministry of Labor into a Russian report to the UN Committee on the Elimination of Discrimination against Women."

This indicator, according to Kovalenin, was used again in 1999, in the fifth report, and was reproduced for 20–25 years without rechecking.

== Violent crime statistics ==
According to Rosstat, the number of victims of crimes involving violent actions against a family member in 2017 was (by sex) 25,700 women and 10,400 men.

Number of victims of a family abuse
Year	Total	of them women	Spouses	Of them women	Sons or daughters	of them women
2012	34,026	24,231	12,954	11,640	7,345	3,697
2013	38,235	27,993	14,565	13,269	7,731	4,077
2014	42,829	31,358	16,671	15,246	8,871	4,722
2015	50,780	36,493	19,998	17,908	11,181	5,809
2016	65,543	49,765	29,788	27,256	12,314	6,419
2017	36,037	25,667	15,504	13,360	8,020	3,911
2018	33,235	23,518	14,722	12,516	7,142	3,584

When considering the data on violent crimes against family members, it is noticeable that until the beginning of 2017 the number of victims was growing, but in 2017 it unexpectedly dropped to 36 thousand (a year earlier it was 65.5 thousand). The decrease took place after the State Duma partially decriminalized beatings in January 2017, after which physical abuse without serious consequences for health during family conflicts became an administrative offense (not criminal) in cases where it is not a relapse.

== 2000s ==
In 2008 a representative of the Ministry of Internal Affairs Lt. Gen Mikhail Artamoshkin expressed his concerns over the country's crime rate, that had doubled in the five years between 2002 and 2006. He emphasized that also domestic violence had increased so that up to 40 percent of all serious violent crimes were committed within families.

About two-thirds of premeditated murders and grievous bodily harm was done in intimate relations or within families. The violence in one form or another was observed in almost every fourth family. The reasons for domestic crimes were different and included quarrels and scandals, hostile relations on the basis of families' problems, housing and domestic conflicts, which were often of long-lasting character.

As the main causes over the whole population Artamoshkin referred to "low morale" and income problems, while in wealthy families crimes happened also due to jealousy and avarice. High unemployment frustrated people and led to the abuse of alcohol and violence towards women, children and adolescents.

Artamoshkin stated that the police officers of districts had started to work with families, in co-operation with child protection officials; and that, as a result of the preventive work, the annual cases of domestic violence had decreased by 25–30 percent. Another factor is the decline in alcohol consumption, with alcohol consumption down 40% since the early 2000s according to the World Health Organization.

In a 2003 press release, Amnesty International claimed that 36,000 women in the Russian Federation were beaten by their husbands or partners every day.

The situation was exacerbated by the lack of statistical data on violent crimes, which took into account the nature of relationship between the offender and the victim as well as gender breakdown, and by the attitude of law enforcement officers that did not regard such violence as a serious crime, but rather, as a "private matter" between the spouses and avoid to "interfere with family scandals".

A 2008 article published in Journal of Interpersonal Violence regarding domestic violence among Russian college students found that "High prevalence rates were found for all types of violence, aggression, and [sexual] coercion. Consistent with previous research, male and female students were about equally likely to be victims and perpetrators of all violent and aggressive actions."

=== Police statistics ===
Official statistics from the Russian Ministry of Internal Affairs (MVD) for 2008:

- Every fourth family in the country has experienced violence of different forms
- Two-thirds of homicides are caused by family or household motives.
- Up to 40% of all serious violent crimes are committed within families.

According to the official data from Russian Police, 1,060 people were killed in their own families in year 2015. 304 of them were women, 756 – men and 36 children.

== 2010s ==
According to figures reported by the western media in 2013, women's deaths due to domestic violence had not been markedly diminished in a decade. BBC reported information from a Russian interior ministry that 600,000 women were physically or verbally abused at home. Yelena Mizulina, a member of the Federation Council, cited much lower figures for 2015, reporting that around 300 women per year died at the hands of husbands or other relatives and accusing feminists of inflating the figures.

=== #IAmNotAfraidToSayIt ===
In July 2016, Ukrainian activist Anastasia Melnichenko published a post on Facebook in which she recounted her personal experience of sexual abuse and repudiated the idea that she was somehow to blame. She included the Ukrainian-language hashtag #яНеБоюсьСказати, which translates to #IAmNotAfraidToSayIt or #IAmNotAfraidToSpeak in English; #яНеБоюсьСказать in Russian. Her post was widely shared, and soon afterwards women in Russia and Ukraine began posting their own stories of sexual harassment and assault. Many said it was the first time they had spoken of the incidents. By August 2016, almost 200,000 people had expressed support or shared their stories on social media using her hashtag.

The responses were mixed. Some who commented were supportive, but many others, including journalists, psychologists, and Orthodox Christian representatives, claimed the stories were fabricated, exaggerated, misandrist, or "undermining traditional values."

According to a 2016 report from Global Information Society Watch, "gender-based violence in Russia is an everyday affair." As the Soviet Union lacked any sort of gender violence-preventing legislation, sexual assault has continued not to be taken seriously in the countries that emerged after its collapse, especially in Russia under Vladimir Putin. Even the most egregious rape cases, which at one time would have been universally condemned, often result in no punishment for the perpetrators.

=== Decriminalization ===
In February 2017, with the support of the Russian Orthodox Church, Russia decriminalized domestic violence in cases where it does not cause "substantial bodily harm" (such as broken bones or a concussion) and does not happen more than once a year. Some forms of domestic violence and of other cases of battery against relatives became an administrative offense. As a result, domestic violence increased while reporting declined sharply, and police began to refuse to investigate domestic violence cases.

Marina Pisklakova-Parker, director of the Anna Centre, an organization that helps domestic violence victims, said decriminalization has proven "very dangerous to the safety of thousands of Russian women." In December 2018, Russia's top human rights official, Tatyana Moskalkova, called decriminalization a "mistake" and said new legislation was needed to combat domestic violence.

NGOs filed a complaint with the United Nations in 2013 on behalf of Shema Timagova, a Chechen woman whose husband attempted to murder her with an axe. A Chechen court effectively cleared the husband, finding that the woman had "provoked" him into attacking her. In April 2019, in the UN's first ruling on domestic violence in Russia, the UN Committee for the Elimination of Discrimination Against Women (CEDAW) ruled in Timagova's favor and ordered Russia to pay her "adequate financial compensation." CEDAW further stated that Russia must amend its laws to criminalize gender-based violence and properly investigate allegations of violence against women. Russia was given six months to submit a written response detailing the steps taken with regard to the case.

== Alcohol ==
A 1997 report published in the Journal of Family Violence, found that among male perpetrators of spousal homicide, 60–75% of offenders had been drinking prior to the incident. A survey conducted by the Scientific Research Institute of the Family, 29% of people responding to the question "Why are children beaten in families with which you are acquainted?" reported that the violence was carried out by drunks and alcoholics.

In a 2004 study of domestic violence in the Central Black Earth Region of Russia, 77% of offenders of violent crime (towards family members) were frequent drinkers – 12% engaged in regular binge drinking (three or four times a month), 30% three times a week or more, and 35% every day or almost every day.

== See also ==
- Khachaturian sisters case
- Crime in Russia
