= Anastasia Melnychenko =

Ukrainian human rights activist

- Born: 1984 (age 41–42)
- Other names: Nastya Melnichenko, Ukrainian: Настя Мельниченко
- Occupations: activist, journalist, editor
- Website: studena.org

Anastasia "Nastya" Melnychenko (Ukrainian: Настя Мельниченко; born 1984) is a Ukrainian activist and author who writes on social, historical, and cultural issues. She is a co-founder of STUDENA, a non-profit human rights organization. She is also known as the initiator of the #IAmNotAfraidToSayIt social media campaign in Ukraine and Russia in 2016, a precursor to the MeToo movement.

== Education ==
She earned a bachelor's degree at the Institute of Journalism of the Taras Shevchenko National University of Kyiv in 2007. She earned a master's degree with distinction in archeology and history of Ukraine at the National University of Kyiv-Mohyla Academy in 2010. In 2018, she enrolled in a graduate program in management at the Ukrainian Catholic University.

== Career ==
Melnychenko started her career as a journalist. During the 2000s, she wrote for Ukrainian newspapers, news agencies, and magazines. She served as Editor in Chief of Golden Age magazine (Золотий вік) in 2007. For five years, she was Editor in Chief of Zhila (Жила), a family magazine.

In 2010, she began working as a project coordinator, organizing conferences, lectures, and festivals. Among the projects she worked on were "Equal Opportunities and Women's Rights in Ukraine," a project led by the United Nations Development Programme; the Volyn Center for Research and Revival; and the traveling cultural and educational festival, "From Country to Ukraine."

In September 2015, she co-founded STUDENA, a non-profit organization that aims "to reduce aggressiveness and intolerance in society, promote the idea of equality of rights and opportunities of people, regardless of their sex, race, religion."

== #IAmNotAfraidToSayIt ==
On July 5, 2016, Melnychenko read an online discussion in which a rape victim was told she was to blame. Melnychenko responded by publishing a post on Facebook in which she recounted her personal experience of sexual abuse and repudiated the idea that she was somehow to blame. She included the Ukrainian-language hashtag #яНеБоюсьСказати, which translates to #IAmNotAfraidToSayIt or #IAmNotAfraidToSpeak in English. In an interview with Meduza later that month, she said:

In our country, and yes generally throughout the post-Soviet space, instead of unequivocally blaming the rapist, people immediately start asking what the woman did wrong. They want to know what is wrong with her. Maybe she was wearing a short skirt? Maybe she was walking home too late? Or maybe she was drunk? In the end, a woman is guilty simply because she was born a woman.

Her post was widely shared, and soon afterwards, women in Russia and Ukraine began posting their own stories of sexual harassment and assault. Many said it was the first time they had spoken of the incidents. By August 2016, almost 200,000 women and men had expressed support or shared their stories on social media using her hashtag. In 2018, she published a book by the same name.

== Books ==
- 2019 – And now everything is different. Vydavnytstvo Publishing House.
- 2019 – From Khruli to Ziuziuky. Teza Publishing House.
- 2019 – What’s Found in Khruli. Teza Publishing House.
- 2017 – #IAmNotAfraidToSayIt. Folio Publishing House.

== See also ==
- Violence against women in Ukraine
- Domestic violence in Russia
