= Khachaturyan sisters case =

Criminal case in Russia

The case of the Khachaturyan sisters (Russian: Дело сестёр Хачатурян) is an ongoing high-profile criminal case in Russia that elicited public outrage about domestic violence in the country. Sisters Krestina, Angelina, and Maria Khachaturyan were arrested on 28 July 2018 and charged with the premeditated murder of their father, Mikhail Khachaturyan. When the crime was committed the sisters were 19, 18, and 17 years old.

The defense stated that the sisters acted in self-defence, having no other choice, as they were subjected to constant violence and sexual abuse by their father for a long period of time prior to the alleged crime. The case caused a large-scale public outcry, with social activists defending the sisters. Public protests were held in Moscow, Saint-Petersburg and other cities, supporting the sisters and calling for a change in legislation governing domestic violence and its prevention.

In April 2025, Mikhail Khachaturyan was posthumuously convicted for sexual assault, grievous bodily harm, and distribution of pornography. The investigation against his daughters is still considered active, but it is expected that the charges against them will be dropped.

== Timeline ==
=== Arrest ===
A staircase, where one of Khachaturyan sisters goes out after the murder

On the evening of 27 July 2018, the body of 57-year-old Mikhail Khachaturyan was found with "multiple stab and cut wounds on the chest and neck" on the staircase of his apartment building on the Altufevskoe highway in Moscow. During the search, police seized numerous weapons from the Khachaturyan’s apartment: a knife, a hammer, a crossbow, a rifle, two air guns, a traumatic weapon, 16 bullets, and 16 darts. The next day his three daughters were arrested on suspicion of murder: Krestina, Angelina, and Maria, aged 19, 18, and 17. When questioned, they admitted to the act of murder and disclosed a reason for committing a crime, recorded by investigators as a "hostile personal relationship due to the father causing moral suffering for a prolonged time." On 29 July, they were charged with murder without aggravating circumstances. As the defendants testified, Mikhail had beaten and humiliated his daughters, and also subjected them to moral assault and sexual abuse over the years.

As shown by the investigation, on the day of his death, Mikhail Khachaturyan returned home after medical treatment at the Solovyov Psychiatric and Neurological Centre and again punished his daughters for extra expenses and "mess" in their apartment. The man locked himself in a room with each of them and sprayed gas from a pepper spray into the girls’ faces. Poisoned by a large dose of gas, Krestina fainted due to an asthma attack. Then, Angelina and Maria, fearing for the health of their older sister, decided to kill their father. In the evening, while Mikhail was dozing in an armchair, the two younger sisters attacked him by hitting with a hunting knife and a hammer. Awoken, Khachaturyan tried to defend himself. Krestina heard the noise, came into the room, and dispersed pepper spray in the direction of her father, to protect her sisters. She then ran to the stairs outside the apartment. Khachaturyan followed her. Angelina grabbed the knife from Maria and stabbed Mikhail once in the heart, killing him. After Khachaturyan’s death, his daughters cut themselves with the knife to make it appear that he attacked them, and called the emergency police line.

Shortly after the arrest, journalists started publishing audio recordings and the correspondence of the girls, which would prove that they suffered violence and sexual harassment from their father. Their lawyers adopted a defense strategy that denied a premeditated conspiracy, and focused on the spontaneity of the murder due to the difficult emotional condition of the sisters.

=== Family environment ===
Along with the main investigation, members of the Public Monitoring Commission initiated an inspection of local child protection agencies. In the opinion of the defense, the organization did not take the necessary steps after receiving complaints about the Khachaturyan father from the sisters’ school teachers. Moreover, Mikhail Khachaturyan was repeatedly reported to the police, but, after the murder, law enforcement agencies denied that they received such complaints both via the hotline and to the local police station. The girls’ mother, Aurelia Dunduk, suggested that police inaction was due to Khachaturyan’s close ties with the local police chiefs. This information was subsequently confirmed by the Novaya Gazeta informants from the federal security agency.

Aurelia Dunduk met her future husband in 1996, three years after her move to Moscow. According to her, Khachaturyan began beating her when she was 19 years old and was pregnant with their first child, son Sergey. Later, she characterised their marriage as follows: "We got married with tears in my eyes. He beat me — and after that, we went to get married. And this continued for 20 years. With his relatives, with strangers — he could yell at me, beat me to the blood, and then say as if nothing had happened: "Aurelia, make me some tea."" Dunduk also testified that Khachaturyan bullied their son Sergey, beat him severely for "educational purposes", and, after the boy graduated from the eighth grade, the father kicked him out of the house. After some time, Khachaturyan drove Aurelia out of the house and forbade her to meet her daughters under threat of murder.

Friends and acquaintances noted Mikhail’s piety and superstitions, and strict rules that he established for the family. Khachaturyan’s mother, sister, and nephew lived with the rest of the family. They shared the father’s patriarchal and misogynistic views and argued that Aurelia should suffer beatings. According to Dunduk, Khachaturyan became addicted to sleeping pills, which, among other things, caused a dramatic change in his mood. Neighbors, teachers, daughters' friends, and their parents confirmed that Khachaturyan often behaved violently toward his family.

As the defendants and witnesses testified, Mikhail Khachaturyan began to harass the daughters shortly after breaking up with his wife. One of the sisters attempted suicide after being forced to perform oral sex on Khachaturyan, but was resuscitated by doctors. During the investigation, the sisters claimed that the father forced them to perform sexual acts against their will. Angelina’s friends and relatives also testified about more than ten cases of sexual violence against her known to them. A medical examination confirmed that the girls had injuries due to sexual abuse. In 2018, Khachaturyan practically ceased to let the young women out of the house. Dunduk claims that her daughters did not tell her about the ongoing situation in the family, so as not to upset her.

In one of the interviews, Krestina told about the order their father established at home:

He demanded that we always be there and come at his first call. He had a special bell, which he rang, and one of us should immediately run up to him, day and night. And do whatever he says — to bring water, food and miscellaneous other… He could not make an effort even to open the window himself, and we had to serve him as slaves.

Maria and Angelina went to the same grade but in recent years, they were almost never allowed go to school as their father forced them to look after him. Sisters reported that they were constantly bullied and threatened with weapons. Apart from the school psychologist, who tried to talk to the girls about their family situation, neighbors and school teachers preferred not to interfere and did not provide any significant support. Moreover, some relatives and friends of Mikhail Khachaturyan defended him and asserted that accusations of sexual abuse and domestic violence were simply provocations. For example, the girls’ cousin, Arsen Khachaturyan, opined that they lied about beatings to slander their father.

=== Investigation ===
On 30 July 2018, a remand court hearing was held in the Ostankino court of Moscow for the arrested girls. The judge extended the jail term for another 72 hours. A spokesman for the court reported that, during the proceedings, the investigators upgraded the charges from non-aggravated murder to murder "committed by a group of persons, a group of persons by previous concert, or an organised group" (Article 105.2 (g) of the Russian Criminal Code), punishable by up to twenty years of imprisonment for adult females, or up to ten years for minors.

In early August, the investigation conducted an examination of the murder weapons and interrogated relatives and friends of the accused. Moreover, the investigators received copies of videos from surveillance cameras in the Khachaturyan’s house and conducted an investigative experiment at the crime scene. The prosecutors came to the conclusion that the girls took concerted actions, and the younger sister Maria stabbed their father at least 35 times.

Lawyers Aleksei Liptser, Aleksei Parshin, and Yaroslav Pakulin continued to insist on the defendants’ innocence and argued that the young women tried to prevent the violence and acted defensively:

the girls lived in an environment of the constant threat for their own lives and the lives of their sisters. Being practically isolated from the outside world, they were convinced that it was impossible to get outside help and this made the situation hopeless. Their actions were aimed at stopping the inevitable violence that was committed against them.”

On 31 July, representatives of the Moscow Public Monitoring Commission visited the sisters in a pre-trial detention facility (the SIZO). There, the girls reported violations of their legal rights by police following the arrest; for example, the accused were not explained their rights and gave their first testimony without lawyers.

On 2 August, the Ostankino Court of Moscow extended the pre-trial custody by another two months. Four days later, the central office of the Investigative Committee took up the case. The Russian Commissioner for Human Rights, Tatyana Moskalkova, considered the court decision to be excessive, while the defense filed an appeal. In the SIZO, the defendants got the opportunity to study and meet a psychologist. In early September, after a mental health examination, the younger sister was recognized as unaware of her actions and transferred to the psychiatric ward of Butyrka prison. Although the other two sisters were found to be sane, the experts diagnosed them with the battered woman syndrome and post-traumatic stress disorder.

In mid-August, the investigation recognised Khachaturyan’s "immoral actions" towards his daughters and confirmed the fact of psychological and sexual abuse. Although the court first rejected the petition on house arrest, on 27 September, it granted a motion of the investigator to release the sisters from the detention center. They were required to stay in separate flat and barred from leaving their places at night, using any means of communication including telephone or Internet, as well as contacting anyone besides their lawyers and investigators. On 18 October, the Moscow City Court satisfied the defense appeal against the measure, allowing the sisters to talk to anyone unrelated to their case.

The sisters’ uncle, Genadik Musaelya, was recognised as a victim in the investigation. Together with his wife Naira Khachaturyan, who is also Mikhail’s sister, Musaelya has filed a complaint against the girls’ release from the detention centre. Despite the fact that the defendants themselves abandoned their father’s inheritance, some relatives, speaking in the media, accused them of mercenary motives. Furthermore, their grandmother cancelled Krestina's registration in the apartment.

On 14 June 2019, investigators announced the conclusion of the investigation, reiterating that the sisters were finally charged with a murder committed by a group of people following a premeditated conspiracy. "Unlawful acts of violence by the father" were mentioned as the motive for the murder. In response, the lawyers filed complaints to the Chairman of the Investigative Committee, Alexander Bastrykin. The defense insisted that the investigation should recognize self-defence as the main motive for urging the girls to the crime.

On 11 July 2019, it was reported that the Investigative Committee planned to posthumously charge Mikhail Khachaturyan with torture, violent acts of a sexual nature, and forcing participation in sexual act.

In early 2020, it was reported that Deputy Prosecutor General Viktor Grin refused to sign the indictment against the sisters, suggesting that the investigators should reclassify the charges from murder to necessary self-defence. Investigators objected, however, the Prosecutor General Yuri Chaika insisted on the order, stressing that additional psychological and psychiatric evaluations were needed.

By 13 May, additional investigation had been completed, and the murder charges remained in place. In July, the Prosecutor General's office approved the indictment.

In August 2020, as the case reached the Moscow City Court, it granted a motion by the lawyers of Krestina and Angelina for the case to be heard by a jury. Maria had been declared unfit to stand trial, and the prosecutors were expected to request a court to order medical treatment for her, in a separate trial.

On 4 December 2020, the Basmanny Court in Moscow declared illegal the investigator's refusal to launch a criminal case against Mikhail Khachaturyan. In early February 2021, the Moscow City Court remanded the case against Angelina and Krestina back to prosecutors until their father's actions get a legal qualification. In March, the case against Mikhail was opened on charges of sexual assault, sexual coercion, and torture, and the sisters were recognized as his victims.

In 2021, during the investigation against Mikhail Khachaturyan, experts posthumously declared that he had manipulated people by means of intimidation, demonstration of violence, cruelty, insults, humiliation, resorted to battery, abuse, physical and sexual violence, and that he had a sexual attraction disorder, namely pedophilia.

On 29 May 2022, it was reported that the investigation against Mikhail was over. He was charged with sexual violence, battery, and distribution of pornography.

However, the charges were subsequently changed again. On 30 March 2023, the case was finally brought to the Butyrsky court in Moscow, with Mikhail Khachaturyan charged with two counts of sexual violence against minors, wilful infliction of grievous bodily harm to several persons, as well as distribution of pornography on the Internet.

In October 2023, it was reported that Anatoly Razinkin, the First Deputy Prosecutor General of Russia, denied the request to approve the indictment against Krestina and Angelina. Igor Krasnov, the Prosecutor General, concurred with his opinion as the Investigative Committee tried to object. The investigators were instructed yet again to establish the motives of the girls, taking into account their traumatic experience. It was expected that this demand may lead to the investigation being over only after the verdict in the Mikhail's posthumous case. The investigation against the third sister, Maria, was also expected to last longer, as yet another medical-sexological-psychiatrical evaluation of hers was being prepared. It was not excluded that Krestina and Angelina might be re-examined as well.

On 21 April 2025, Mikhail Khachaturyan was posthumously found guilty on all counts. On 10 November 2025, the Moscow City Court upheld the decision, correcting the lower court's wording to state that a deceased person could be found to have "committed the crime" but not to be "guilty" of it.

== Public reaction ==
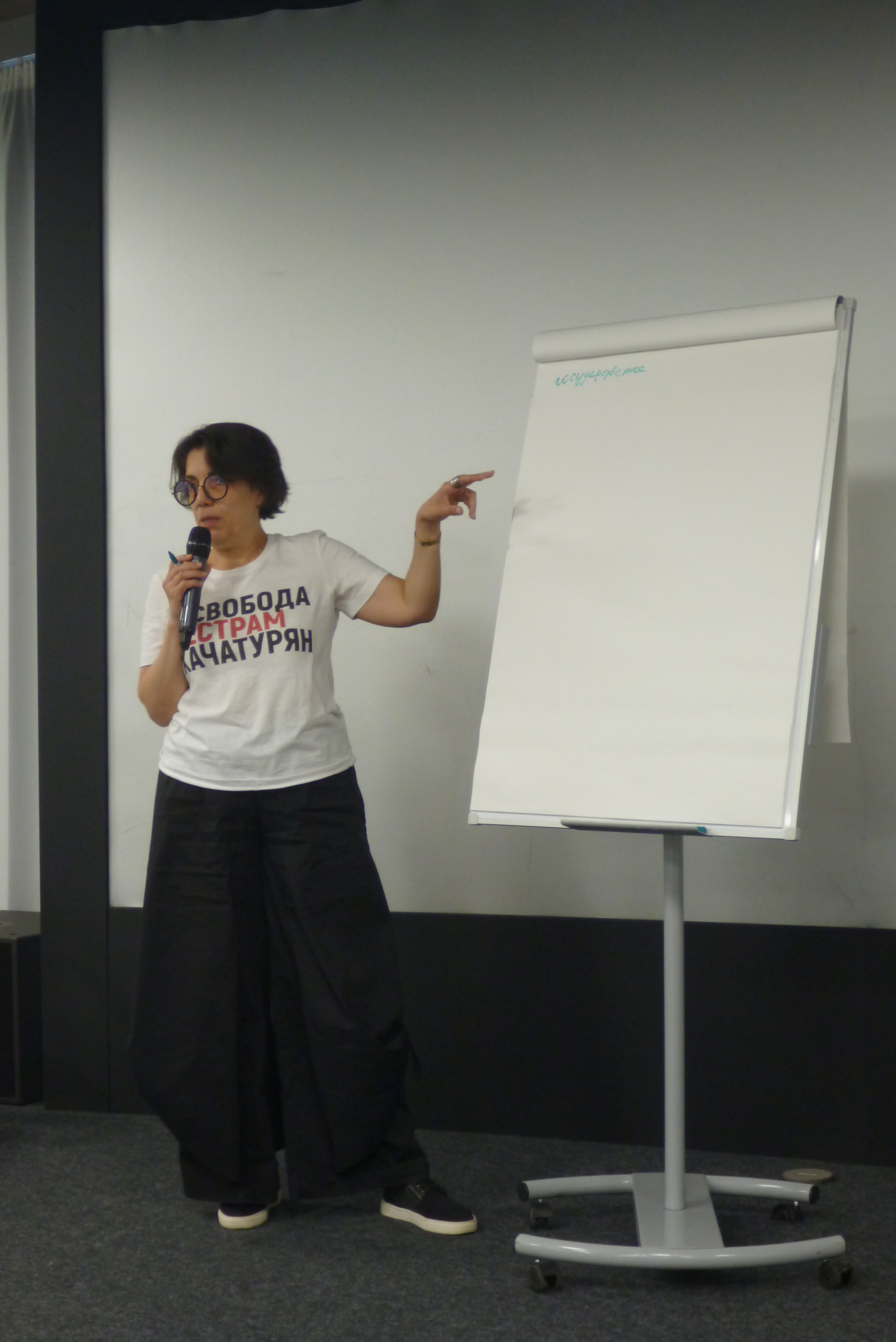
Psychologist Zara Harutyunyan gives a lecture in a T-shirt for the release of Khachaturyan sisters

The court case of the Khachaturyan sisters provoked a strong public reaction and was repeatedly discussed on state TV channels. In Moscow, St. Petersburg and other large cities, protests and single pickets against the sentence were held. Supporters of the Khachaturyan sisters launched a petition asking the Investigation Committee to stop criminal proceedings. By June 2019, more than 115 thousand people signed the petition.

On July 6, instead of the unauthorized (instead of Academician Sakharov Avenue, the mayor's office suggested holding a march in Lyublino) on Bolotnaya Square in Moscow, a series of pickets in support of the girls took place. The sculpture "Children - Victims of Adult Vices" was also approached by activists of the Male State, who considered the sisters to be cold-blooded killers (the "March of the Sisters" did not pass, among other things, because, according to the organizers, they received threats from supporters of the "Male State" and the nephew of the deceased - Arsen Khachaturyan). Four people were detained, three of them were Male State members. The organizers tried to agree on a march on Sakharov Avenue on July 27, but were refused (Maryino was proposed as an alternative site).

The girls were supported by many public figures: American singer Serj Tankian, writer Narine Abgaryan, journalists Ksenia Sobchak and Yury Dud, musician Basta, singer Anna Sedokova, as well as by NGOs Кризисный центр для женщин and Насилию.нет and others.

The public outcry was due to its significance for the current Russian judicial system. According to Elena Solovyova, the head of the advocates association Sodeistvie, the case of Khachaturyan sisters can contribute to the reconsideration of the concept of "necessary self-defense" and expand its legal application. In the media and social networks, users actively discussed the ethical side of the court case and the problem of the silence of diasporas. Nevertheless, many criticize the behavior of the sisters based on their "happy" look in the photos in social networks.

== See also ==
- Domestic Violence in Russia
