= Anti–organized crime institutions in Russia =

Anti-organized crime institutions in Russia are being developed. Since the collapse of the Soviet Union, organized crime has taken control of many major sectors of Russia's state economy, society, and government. Most initiatives and institutions developed against organized crime groups have failed. Others, that have managed to remain standing, struggle in having any influence over the groups or cannot stop them, thus sitting idly without the ability to influence any crime. Owing to the Russian government's continuous failure to curb organized crime, other nations such as the United States have tried to intervene and assist it in finding strategies.

Map of Russia

Organized crime does not have a set definition that is recognized worldwide because every nation defines organized crime by different terms depending on their perceptions of variables such as culture and policy. In Russia, organized crime is defined by law enforcement authorities as, "... an organized community of criminals ranging in size from 50 to 1,000 persons, which is engaged in systematic criminal business and protects itself from the law with the help of corruption." The Federal Bureau of Investigation (FBI) in the United States defines organized crime as "... a self-perpetuating, structured and disciplined association of individuals or groups, combined for the purpose of obtaining monetary or commercial gains or profits, wholly or in part by illegal means, while protecting their activities through a pattern of graft and corruption." Federico Varese, a Professor in Criminology at the University of Oxford, offers yet another view of organized crime, particularly pertaining to mafia groups, "a mafia group is a particular type of organized crime that specializes in one particular commodity [...] protection".

== Background ==
The Communist Soviet Union collapsed after Mikhail Gorbachev tried to open the country via his policies of perestroika (1986) and glasnost (1988). While his actions brought the Soviet Union out of isolation from the international community, the initiatives are also seen as a failure because he tried to implement them too quickly. The shift from a state-run economy to a market economy was not gradual, it was abrupt. The nation was not ready for such a quick, drastic change.

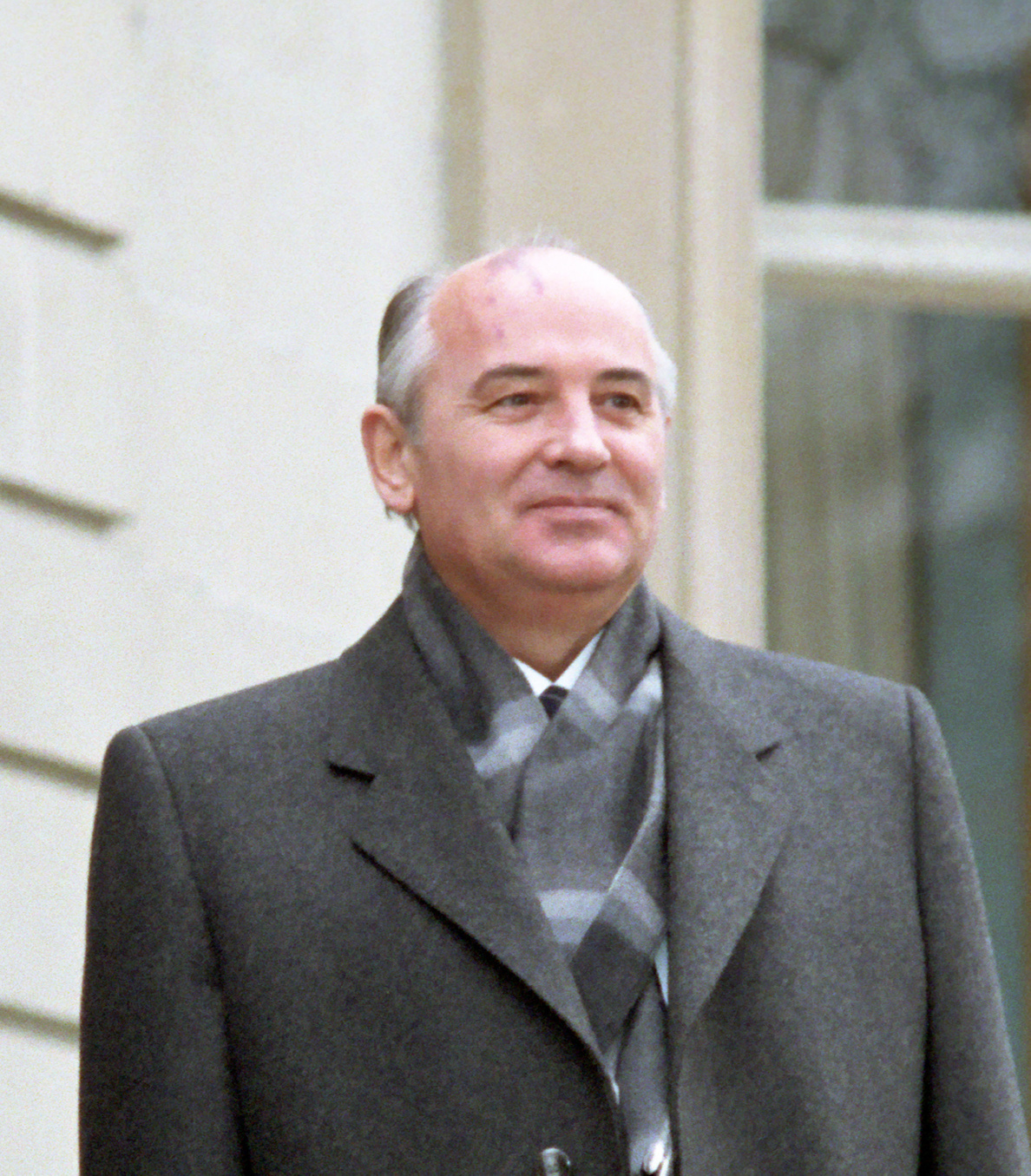
Mikhail Gorbachev in 1985 before the onset of perestroika and glasnost

The new Russian Federation was forced into a market economy after decades of suppression and an entirely state-run economy. The new Russian state government did not have experience with democracy and could not smoothly transition to a democracy and market economy at the same time. Laws for this new type of state were not in place and when the government tried to enact some, they proved to be very hard to enforce as the population also did not yet understand how democracy and a market economy functioned. The chaos and fear that now plagued the Russian state opened the doors to a large increase in crime.

Vladimir Volkov, an Associate Professor of Sociology at the European University at St. Petersburg, cites some useful statistical data showing the immense upward trend of crime in the new Russian state, "... in 1986 the militia registered 1,122 cases of extortion in Russia, in 1989 the number jumped to 4,621". By 1996 there were a registered total of 17,169 cases of extortion. This number included only cases that were reported and responded to by militia; it is unknown how many cases were unreported. On the other hand, 1996 also saw crime plateau. The following years and in present day, there are not as many groups (although the groups that do exist are extremely powerful).
Phil Williams showed the drastic increase in crime groups after the Soviet Union's collapse, "... Russia has increased from 3,000 [criminal organizations] in the early 1990s to over 8,000 at the end of 1995...."

With unsuccessful attempts at stifling organized crime, organized crime groups took control of a significant number of large, vital, and previously state-owned corporations and businesses. Organized crime groups interrogated and exploited private business owners. If a business owner refused to agree to pay a crime group to protect his business, the crime group would simply kick him out of his own business or, as in the majority of cases, murder him and then take over the business themselves.

By the mid-1990s the Russian government realized that some type of effective action was needed if it wanted to avoid losing the entire Russian economy and society to organized crime groups. Hence, initiatives and decrees began to be developed and implemented, although with little success.

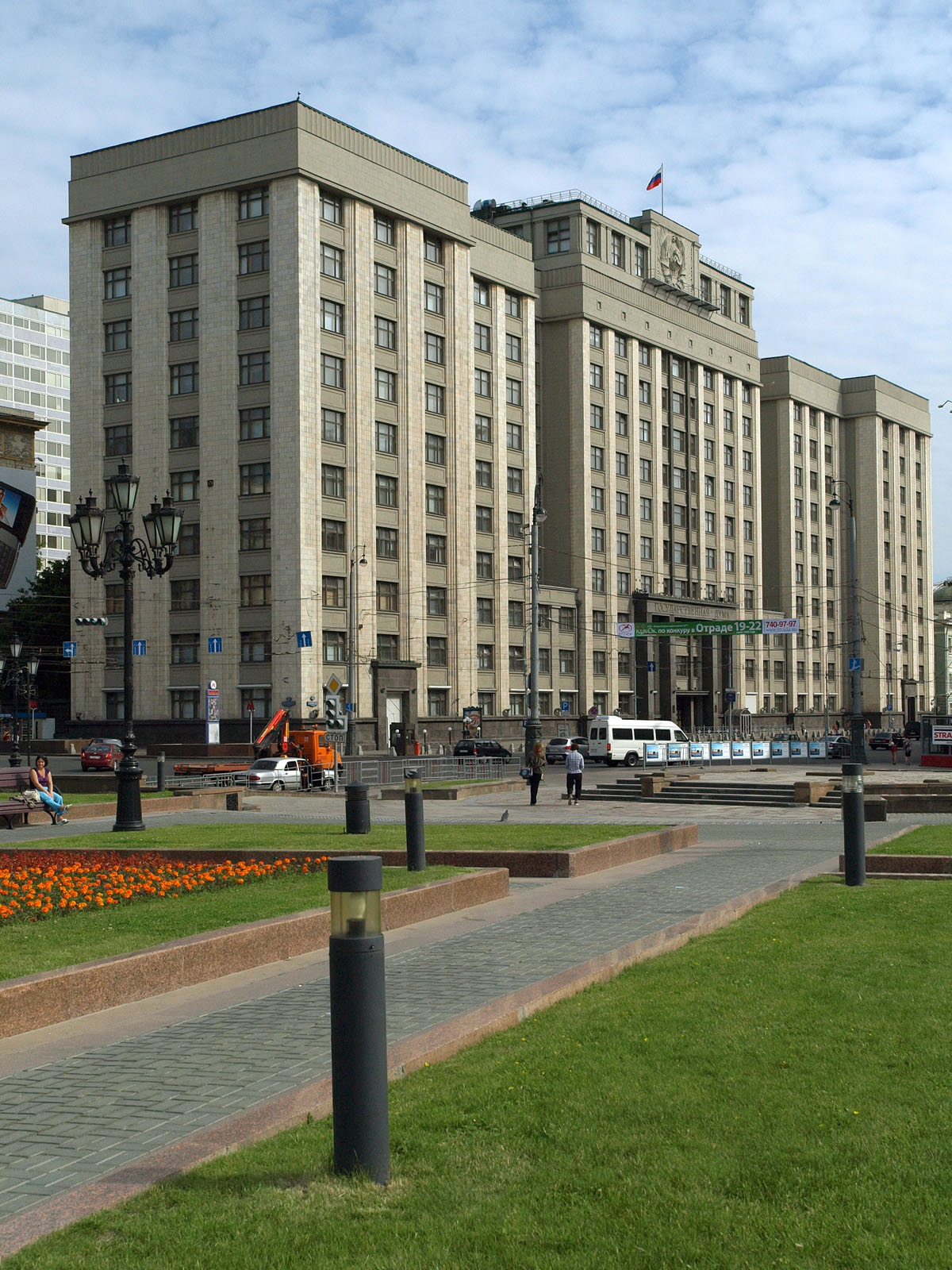
The State Duma in Moscow, Russia.

== Government ==
In the beginning of their struggle with organized crime, Russia did not try to seek foreign assistance. In recent times, however, it has actively sought foreign help to fight organized crime groups in the country. Even with aid, organized crime remains a serious problem. In fact, aid has offered very little actual help as programs are hard to follow through with and are usually simply dropped.

Boris Yeltsin's government, the first government of the new democratic Russian state, was unable to curb crime in the administration. Instead it later turned out that almost all major government agencies and personalities had been linked to organized crime and/or corruption in some way.

The Russian government does not have the resources or dedicated individuals to combat crime. The State Duma has long been discussing legislative proposals but response has been weak. Due to the inability of the state to extinguish the criminal organizations, the population no longer trusts the government to get the protection they need. In fact, citizens can only depend on the organized crime groups to get any effective protection anymore of their homes, families, and businesses. Even official law enforcement agents have begun to partner up with the organized crime groups, because doing so has become one of the best ways to make money and stay safe.

=== Ministry of Internal Affairs (MVD) ===
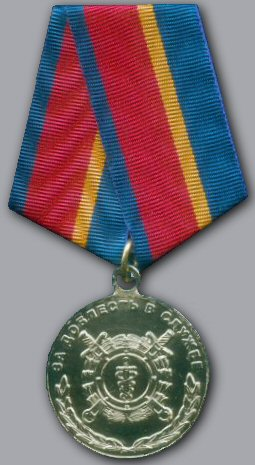
Russian Federation, Ministry of the Interior (MVD), Medal "For Valor in Service" of the Department for Combating Organized Crime.

The Ministry of Internal Affairs is the government agency in charge of combating organized crime. The agency has been around long before the collapse of the Soviet Union. A few of its branches include the militsiya, the tax police, and the Organized Crime Control Department. The MVD always participates in any crime related investigations or actions in the Duma. Few members of the MVD have been known to be collaborators with organized crime.

=== Federal Security Service ===
The Federal Security Service (FSB) is the post-communist version of the Committee on State Security (KGB). They, like the MVD, and the KGB did, work against organized crime in Russia. Often the MVD and the FSB work hand-in-hand to try to stop crime. On the other hand, many FSB officials have been known to be corrupted and collaborating with organized crime groups.

=== Anti-crime decrees ===
==== In the first Yeltsin Administration ====
By the mid-1990s Yeltsin's administration began to create some programs to try to alleviate their state of their organized crime problem. In 1995 then President Yeltsin met with the Security Council of Russia to hear reports administered by the Ministry of Internal Affairs (MVD) on the status of organized crime in the state. Results were obviously negative, showing a lot of crime with little enforcement against it. In a meager attempt to address the issue, Yeltsin ordered more funding and coordination among judicial bodies against organized crime. Nothing ever happened with this initiative.

Later in 1995 Yeltsin made a very controversial attempt against crime. He created his own anti-crime law which allowed "... the police broad authority to search premises, seize documents, investigate finances, and hold, for up to 30 days, people suspected of organized crime activity."

In July, the State Duma allowed the expansion of the number of government agencies who could make investigations. Also in July, the Duma passed a law called "On Fighting Organized Crime" containing descriptions of what organized crime is and which organized crime groups are involved, along with 60 extra articles. The law was signed in by Yeltsin in 1996. Within its 60 articles it outlined how many years of prison organized crime groupmembers, government officials, and participants in organized crime should receive upon conviction. By the next year the new law seemed to disappear from memory and again nothing strict was being done about organized crime.

===== Regional Anti-Organized Crime Directorate =====
The Regional Anti-Organized Crime Directorate (RUBOP, RUOP, or UBOP) was created in 1992 to track and suppress organized crime groups. Several such regional anti-organized crime directorates were set up all over the country. These directorates served as "an elite police force with extraordinary powers". RUBOP also maintained a database of all listed organized crime groups and the individuals who participated in them. In 1996, however, the database was sold to private hands and was no longer updated.

==== Initiatives by Alexander Lebed ====
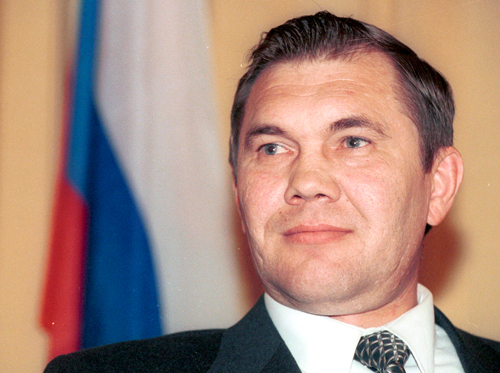
Aleksandr Lebed

General Aleksandr Lebed was the Security Council secretary in the Yeltsin administration. Lebed was a die-hard advocate of anti-organized crime institutions. Although he was quickly dismissed after Yeltsin became aware of a circulating rumor in 1996 of a potential military coup, Lebed enforced quite a few initiatives.

Lebed implemented new powers for his secretary position of the Security Council:

1. The secretary of the Security Council was granted permission to bring notice to the president of any high-ranking official suspected of corruption.
2. The secretary was given the authority to investigate all high-ranking officials to be elected and present the information to the president.
3. The secretary of the Security Council was given the permission to review draft presidential decrees with other members of the Security Council.

Furthermore, Lebed forced Yeltsin to sign into law a decree, that amongst other things, allowed for sting operations against Moscow-area crime lords. The decree also included the following anti-organized crime actions:

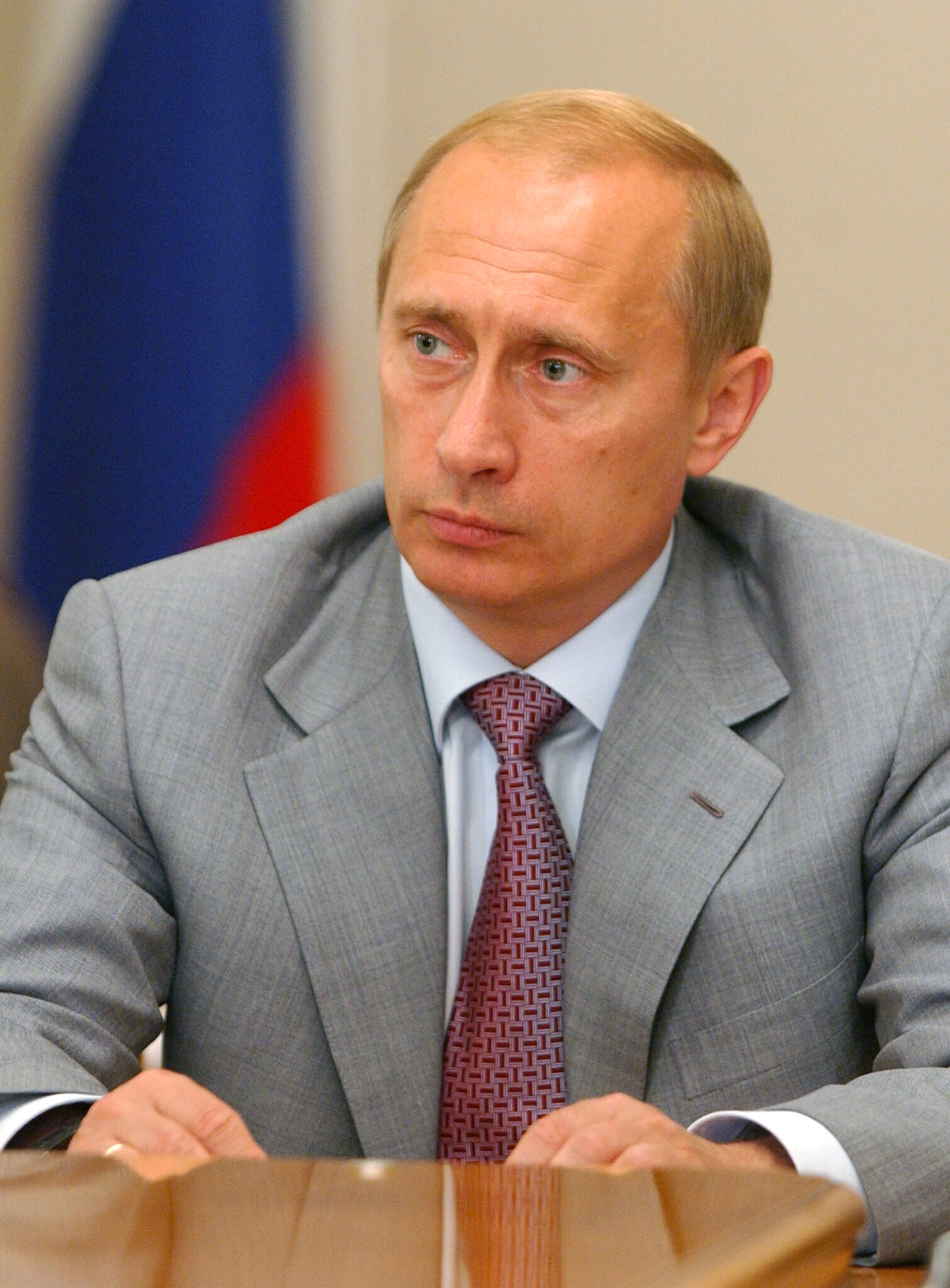
Vladimir Putin

1. The "rapid deployment unit" division was given an additional 19,000 men to patrol streets.
2. The special tax police, a branch of the MVD, was given an extra 1,000 men.
3. Moscow's criminal court system acquired 650 new judges.
4. Corrupt officials would be temporarily removed from their office until proven not guilty.
5. The establishment of a program to protect witnesses, judges, and prosecutors from harm during the entirety of their trial.

==== The Putin Administration ====
Vladimir Putin has been a key government player since at least the year 2000. He is also an ex-FSB prime minister. When he was elected president in 2000 the first thing Putin did was grant himself and his family immunity from being prosecuted or investigated under the Presidential Decree Number 1763. On the other hand, Putin created a new security agency to fight organized crime called the Federal Service for the Investigation of Fight against Corruption (FSRBK). At the same time, in 2000, Putin threatened all Internet traffic when he authorized SORM-2, an eavesdropping network, to monitor all Internet traffic in real time.

== Helping suppress Russia's crime: the United States ==
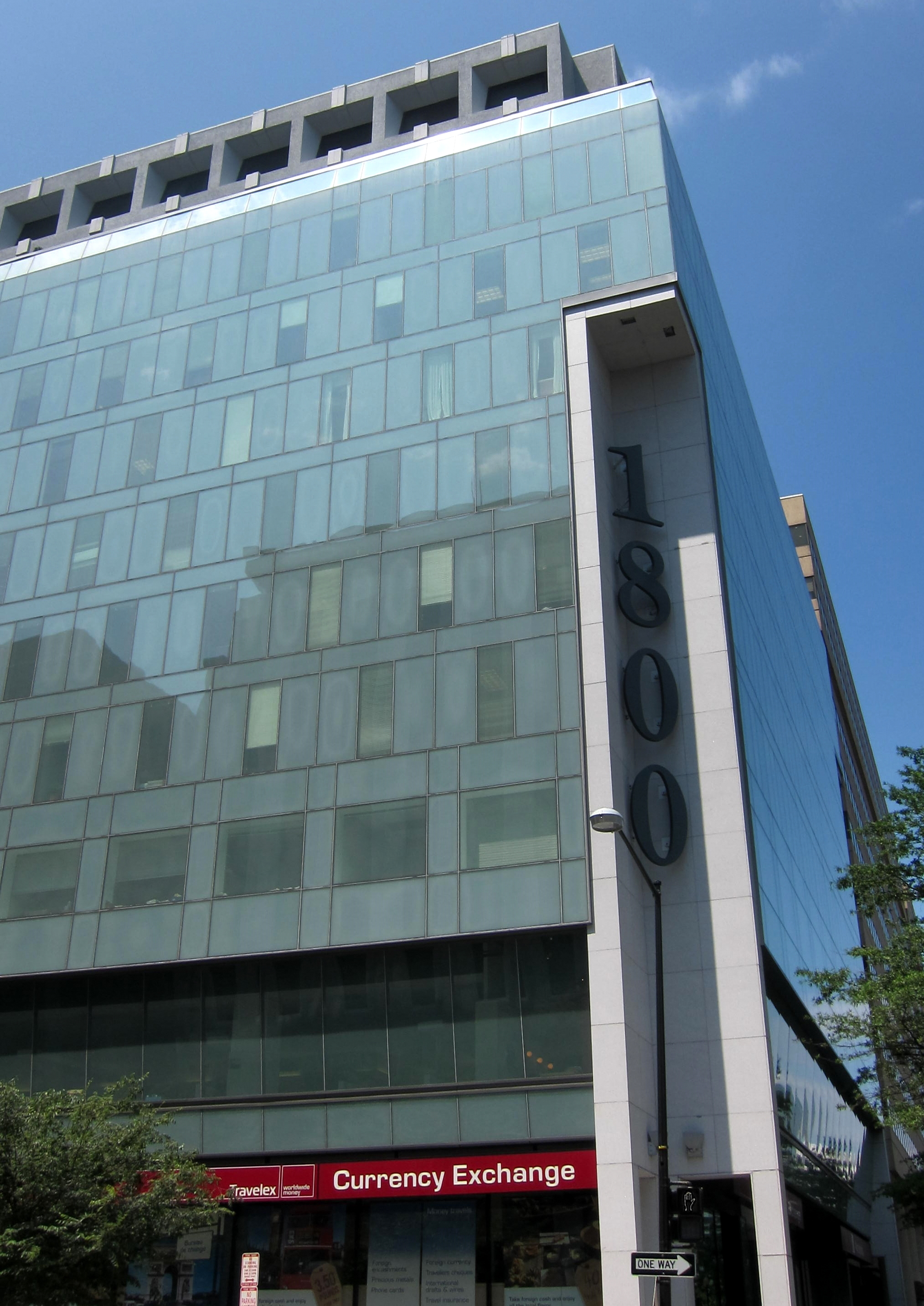
Center for Strategic and International Studies 1800 K Street, N.W., Washington, D.C. 20006

The United States has been trying to help Russia find ways to battle organized crime groups since the early 1990s. However, its initiatives have tended to fall through because no one follows up after agreements or plans are made. Also, the Russian Federation often assured the United States that the crime was being taken care of successfully. The United States did not investigate the validity of that claim but just believed organized crime issues were truly being resolved. Since the 1990s, the United States government had steadily began to realize that Russia has been misguiding it. Hence, in recent times the United States has taken stronger action to assist Russia against organized crime.

=== Center for Strategic and International Relations ===
The Center for Strategic and International Studies (CSIS) is located in Washington, D.C. It was established in 1962 and concentrates on international public policy issues. CSIS seeks to analyze global challenges and shape policy decision in government and the private sector.

==== Russian Organized Crime Task Force Report 1997 ====
The following summary was compiled by the Russian Organized Crime Task Force, and published by CSIS, to assist the United States in proceeding with future assistance to the Russian government as they struggle to battle organized crime. Although the summary was compiled in 1997, the same recommendations still stand today.

Summary of Recommendations for the United States Government

The following list has been copied from the Russian Organized Crime and Corruption: Putin's Challenge : Global Organized Crime Project Report, 2000

1. Russian organized crime (ROC) should receive public recognition from the president of the United States as a national security threat.
2. The development of a free market in Russia founded on the rule of law should be recognized as the only long-term policy solution to the ROC problem and must be central to all U.S. policy decisions.
3. In order to mitigate instances of corruption within the Russian government, U.S. policies and actions should shift from support for political personalities to support for segments of the Russian government that are working to usher in the rule of law. Strengthening the rule of law will foster the emergence of a viable market economy in Russia, free from the coercion and extortion activities of ROC groups.
4. Russia must work toward the creation of a strong and impartial judiciary to implement and enforce a fair body of civil, criminal, and contact law to regain control over the adjudication role currently played by ROC groups.
5. U.S. support for reform should reinforce training and exchanges such as those currently in place, funded through the National Endowment for Democracy, the State Department, the Justice Department, and the U.S. Agency for International Development (USAID). These programs, as well as similar efforts within the private sector and the academic community, should be continued and expanded through appropriate funding by the United States Congress.
6. A similar effort should be undertaken in the private sector to support the legitimate regulation of Russian industry, business, and trade. Specifically, the Russian government should be assisted in establishing uniform business operation regulations, professional standards for certain industries, and requirements for the issuance and regular renewal of business licenses and other permits.
7. Stringent requirements to ensure transparency in Russia's use of foreign aid, multilateral loans and export financing should be implemented and enforced to insulate the funds from organized crime (OC) and to ensure that the funds reach their intended destinations.
8. The United States should initiate a discussion at the level of the Summit of the Eight of an investment treaty to deny export credits to Western firms doing business with OC-controlled firms in Russia.
9. Because ROC activity requires a response from various U.S. government agencies with multiple roles and missions, decisions about whether prosecution or foreign policy objectives take precedence should be made on a case-by-case basis.
10. Because businesspersons often become the targets of ROC activity, a greater effort should be made to provide them with relevant information. The Foreign Commercial Service of the Department of Commerce, in conjunction with the Overseas Security Advisory Committee of the Department of State, should work with other U.S. agencies and the Russian government to advise and support businesspersons, providing them especially with alternatives to paying extortion to criminal elements in Russia.
11. A shared public database on ROC, including a collation of declassified and open-source materials, should be created to assist investors from the United States and other countries. The database could be supplemented by a classified database for use by U.S. government agencies only. Considering the transnational breadth of ROC activity, a database supporting intelligence sharing among various groups like the Group of Eight (G-8), European Police Office (EUROPOL), and the "six nation group" addressing the transnational aspects of the ROC threats is also necessary.
12. The U.S. intelligence community must be directed to fill the immense intelligence gaps on ROC. Their elements should use well-tested operational know-how and tradecraft to recruit informants inside ROC or induce defections from the various ranks of people who can provide hard inside knowledge of how the various ROC elements operate, do not operate, cooperate, and do not cooperate.
13. The interpenetration of Russian officialdom, businesses, and criminal organizations makes it more lucrative than ever that U.S. law enforcement and intelligence agencies fully cooperate and share the fruits of their respective disciplines to serve U.S. policy, security, and commercial interests more capably.
14. Close U.S. government identification with corrupt elements of Russia's political establishment risks serious popular backlash inside Russia. The United States must avoid the appearance of unqualified support for what is routinely seen as a kleptocratic establishment. Such linkage reinforces a growing popular perception that democratic political and market economic systems are merely code words for rapacious criminality. The United States should address this perception by increasing its public diplomacy discussion of the causes and cures for ROC.
15. The U.S. government must support not only senior-level reformers in the Russian government but reformers outside government as well. The United States should not remain silent in the face of official hostility toward human rights leaders like Sergei Kovalev of the Sakharov Foundation or fabricated charges against the environmentalist Captain Alexander Nikitin.

== Conclusion ==
Due to bringing awareness of these suggestions, the Russian Organized Crime Task Force believes the fight against organized crime in Russia is becoming more influential and successful.

Also, in recent times, law enforcement agencies in Russia, Germany, Canada, the United Kingdom, and the United States have tightened coordination and cooperation. In addition, Russia has steadily become more open and accepting of foreign help. Even more, organized crime problems are now being publicly spoken about in the new Russian Federation whereas before any government action or relationship to these criminal groups was kept secret. This opening to the public might be a sign of implementation of stronger actions in the near future.
