= Prohibition in the Russian Empire and the Soviet Union =

Anti-alcohol campaigns in Russia

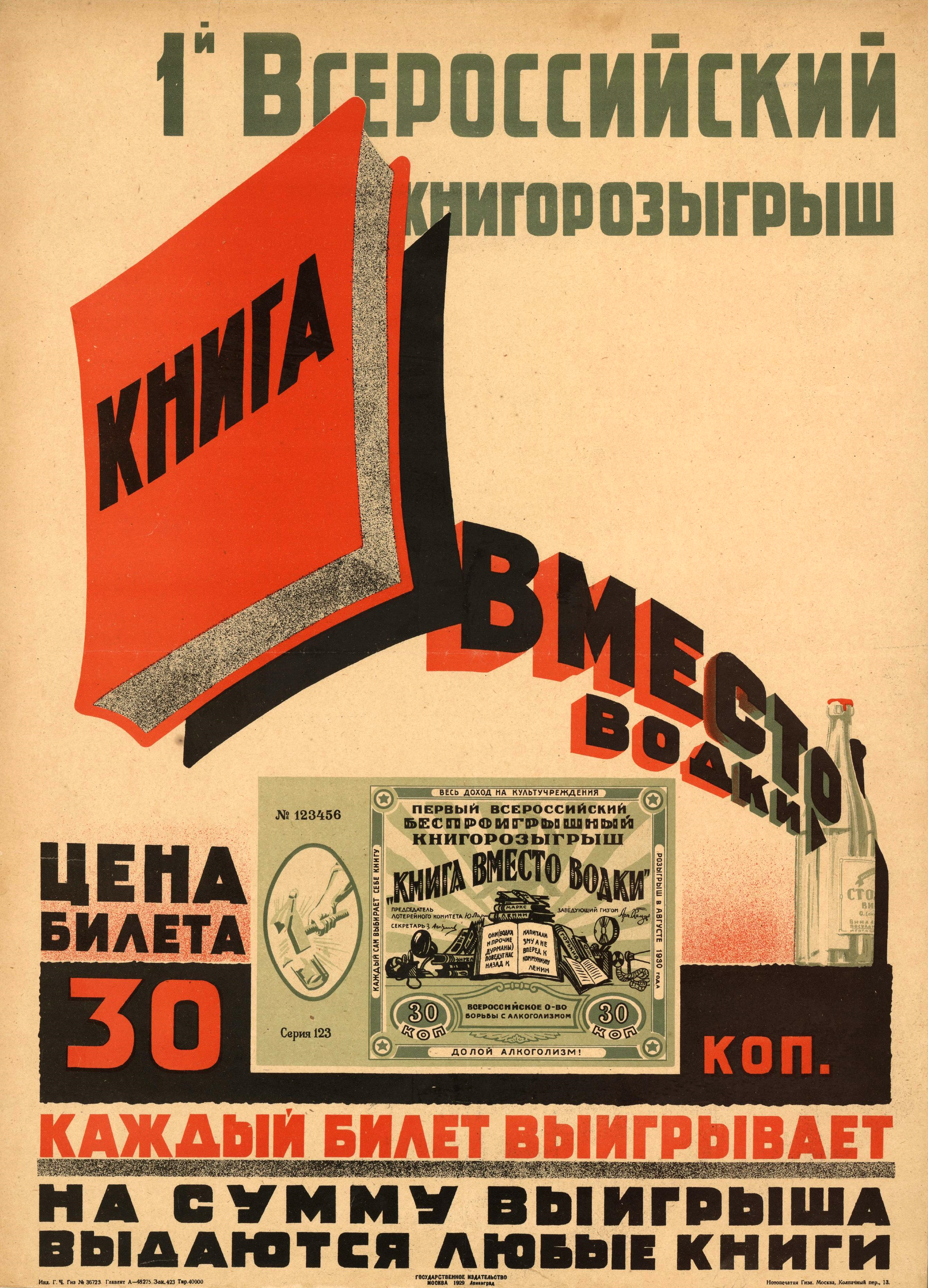
Advertising poster of the 1st All-Russian book lottery "Book instead of vodka". Unknown artist, USSR, 1929

Prohibition in the Russian Empire and the Soviet Union existed during 1914–1925. The Russian term is сухой закон (sukhoy zakon, lit. 'dry law').

== Russian Empire ==
The Tsars monopolized the sale of vodka in the 16th century. By the mid-17th century, one-third of the population's working men were indebted to the government's taverns, which generated substantial revenue. Peter I used this debt to compel military service.

Prohibition was introduced under the rule of Tsar Nicholas II in 1914, at the outset of World War I. It banned the sale of hard liquors, such as vodka, except in privileged establishments.

This curtailment cost the government an estimated billion rubles annually. However, authorities believed the move was needed to improve wartime economic productivity, social orderliness, and military recruitment. Michael Demitrovitch Tchelisheff, credited with leading the prohibition, opposed alcohol because he personally believed that drunkenness benefited autocratic rulers. He was also mayor of Samara.

== Soviet Russia and the Soviet Union ==
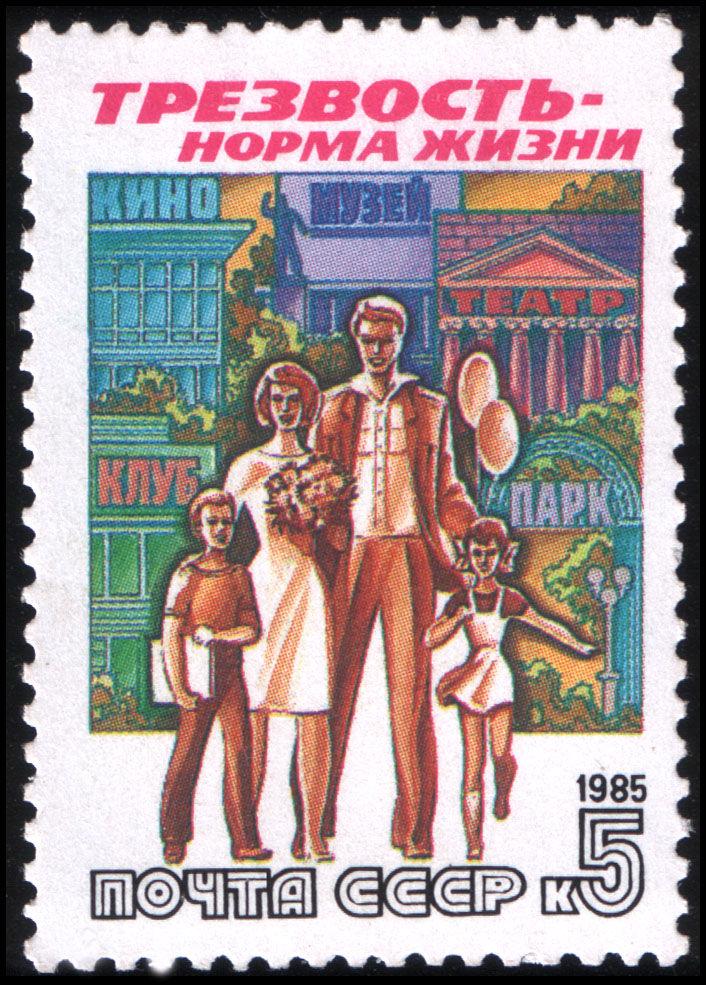
Postage stamp of the USSR in 1985, "Sobriety is the norm of life"

The Tsar abdicated following widespread protests regarding food shortages, which took place on Women's Day in March 1917. This precipitated the Russian Revolution of 1917, during which time Vladimir Lenin rose to power.

Lenin retained the prohibition, which remained in place through the Russian Civil War and into the period of Soviet Russia and the Soviet Union. However, following Lenin's death, Joseph Stalin repealed the prohibition in 1925 and brought back the state vodka monopoly system to increase government revenue. On 4 October 1925 he signed into law the authorization of the sale of 40% grain alcohol.

In the 1950s, there was a significant consumption of alcohol, particularly vodka, in the Soviet Union. Later, the government took various measures to shift the population's drinking habits toward wine and beer. Men typically drank dry or semi-dry wine, while women preferred sweet or semi-sweet varieties. The alcohol consumption in the Soviet Union never exceeded the normal levels seen in European countries, and at that time, alcohol consumption in Europe was even higher.

Following Stalin's death, the Soviet Union held three major anti-alcohol campaigns. The first was held during Nikita Khrushchev's rule in 1958, the second during Leonid Brezhnev's tenure in 1972, and the third (and biggest) was held during Mikhail Gorbachev's years from 1985 to 1988.

=== Prohibition from 1985 to 1988 ===
On May 7, 1985, the Council of Ministers of the USSR adopted a resolution titled "On Measures to Overcome Drunkenness and Alcoholism, and to Eradicate Moonshine Brewing." The authorities were combating the rise in registered alcohol consumption—from 1960 to 1980, this figure (excluding moonshine) increased from 4.6 liters to 10.5 liters per person (actual consumption was estimated at 14 liters). Mortality rose from 6.9 per 1,000 people in 1964 to 10.8 in 1984.

On June 1, the sale of alcoholic beverages was restricted to between 2:00 p.m. and 7:00 p.m on weekdays. These measures led to the closure of over 600 liquor production enterprises and prices for vodka, brandy, and wine were raised by 20 to 30 percent. The campaign also dealt a serious blow to winemaking: vineyard areas decreased from 200,000 hectares to 168,000 hectares, and attempts were made to destroy the reserves of the famous Crimean winery Massandra.

By 1984, the average per capita consumption of wine-based drinks, whether from grapes or other fruits, was 27 liters annually. However, following the anti-alcohol campaign, this figure dropped dramatically to just 3 liters per person.

As for strong alcoholic beverages like vodka and cognac, by the mid-1980s, the average consumption was around 10-11 liters per person per year. According to official data, following the anti-alcohol campaign, this dropped to 6 liters. In reality, however, there was no significant reduction in consumption.

Ironically, the primary challenges in obtaining alcohol were not faced by alcoholics but by ordinary citizens.

The results of the anti-alcohol campaign were similar to those seen in all societies where prohibition laws were enforced: the emergence of an illegal market, organized crime, counterfeit products, and the proliferation of dangerous substitutes. Some individuals even turned to narcotics. Moreover, the alcohol consumption model that had previously centered around wine and beer was disrupted.

The consequences of these changes were visible in economic and social data. Between 1985 and 1987, sugar sales rose by 18%, or 1.4 million tons, due to the increased demand for homemade alcohol. Additionally, there was an influx of ersatz goods, including windshield cleaner and laboratory-grade alcohol used for cleaning instruments, leading to cases of alcohol poisoning and even deaths.

In rural areas, home-distilled spirits (samogon) became widespread, with about 23% of the population engaging in its production.

Vodka in the USSR had always been expensive, as a significant portion of its price was due to excise taxes, which were a major source of state revenue. By 1989, the Soviet government, according to the then-Minister of Finance Valentin Pavlov, had lost out on 91.8 million rubles in revenue from alcohol (out of a total government income of 459 million rubles). The economic losses to the state were one of the key reasons behind the discontinuation of the anti-alcohol campaign in 1990.

As a result of the anti-alcohol campaign, life expectancy increased from 67.7 years in 1984 to 69.8 years in 1987, and mortality dropped from 10.8 per 1,000 people (1984) to 9.9 (1987). Alcohol sales revenue fell by 10.8 billion rubles (from 46.5 billion to 35.7 billion rubles). However, the restrictions sparked widespread public dissatisfaction, along with a recorded increase in drug addiction, substance abuse and bootleg moonshine production. In October 1988, under public pressure, the anti-alcohol campaign was effectively discontinued. Nevertheless, the restrictive laws formally remained in effect until 1990.

== See also ==
- Alcohol consumption in Russia
- Drug policy of the Soviet Union
