= List of federal subjects of Russia by incidence of substance abuse =

The following is a list of federal subjects of Russia by incidence of substance abuse (cases per 100,000 inhabitants):

== Drug abuse ==
Federal subject	1992	1994	1996	1998	2000	2002	2004	2006	2008	2010
Russia	3.5	9.5	20.7	35.4	50.7	18.8	14.6	19.1	18.7	17.43
Central Federal District	—	—	—	22.5	32	—	8.1	11.8	13.1	14.35
Belgorod Oblast	2.2	4.4	2.8	3.6	8	—	4.3	9.5	4.2	4.83
Bryansk Oblast	1.4	5.4	6.5	9.5	10.7	—	10.5	11.5	14.4	18.51
Vladimir Oblast	0.3	1	3.2	5.1	17	—	4.3	5.7	6.8	7.74
Voronezh Oblast	3.6	7	8	23.3	26.5	—	7.6	12.3	16.2	12.18
Ivanovo Oblast	0.4	2.2	5.2	5.6	30.2	—	7.6	9.6	17.7	14.83
Kaluga Oblast	5.8	7.5	9.9	24.9	25.1	—	3.8	5.3	5.6	11.75
Kostroma Oblast	0.1	0.6	1	2.3	37.7	—	10.3	6.2	18.3	20.48
Kursk Oblast	1.3	3.3	6	7.2	7.8	—	12.7	33.3	23.8	19.68
Lipetsk Oblast	1.4	5	12.9	39.3	19.4	—	7.6	14.7	16.9	22.91
Moscow Oblast	1	1.8	5.1	18.3	40.9	—	10.2	15	19.8	20.09
Oryol Oblast	1.6	4.4	5.8	17	23.8	—	3.9	2.8	3.2	4.56
Ryazan Oblast	0.5	2.2	2.9	6.4	25	—	2.6	7.2	9.8	11.33
Smolensk Oblast	3.8	8	6.9	20.3	31.3	—	20.3	15.3	13.9	16.6
Tambov Oblast	1.3	3.8	6.9	11.3	16	—	3.1	2.6	3.4	3.74
Tver Oblast	0.6	6.7	17.2	9.4	23.9	—	3.3	10.8	10.3	9.8
Tula Oblast	3	4.7	10.2	19.6	27.6	—	3.7	6.1	6.4	8.15
Yaroslavl Oblast	0.7	1.4	3.4	13.3	19	—	4	3.9	8.5	8.4
Moscow	2.3	3.9	10.6	47.9	52.4	—	9.7	13.2	12.4	15.15
North-West Federal District	—	—	—	19.6	35.6	—	11.7	20	18.5	18.34
Republic of Karelia	0.7	1.4	1.3	11.6	22.5	—	2.7	5.2	4.6	6.97
Komi Republic	0.8	3.2	4	14.4	33.1	—	14.6	19.8	22.3	25.77
Arkhangelsk Oblast	0.4	1.8	2	1.1	3	—	0.9	1.4	2.6	4.71
Nenets Autonomous Okrug	—	—	—	—	—	—	0	19.1	16.7	4.69
Vologda Oblast	0.9	2	2.2	4.9	28.6	—	9.9	9.7	8.4	10.97
Kaliningrad Oblast	23.6	17.6	27.8	18.1	31.9	—	12.8	13.3	5.1	9.46
Leningrad Oblast	1.6	8.2	13.3	23.2	49.5	—	14.2	26.5	28.2	21.87
Murmansk Oblast	0.3	1.9	2.5	14.5	50.2	—	19.6	36.8	37.8	34.45
Novgorod Oblast	1.2	2.8	5.5	33.6	56.7	—	7.7	15.4	13.4	14.94
Pskov Oblast	1.4	2.5	4.6	8.2	21.8	—	10.1	8.8	16.4	17.46
St. Petersburg	7.7	13.2	13.5	32.1	42.1	—	14.2	28.7	23.7	22.15
South Federal District (to 2009)	—	—	—	31.7	44	—	17.5	23.8	17.1	—
Southern Federal District (from 2010)	—	—	—	—	—	—	—	—	—	12.55
Republic of Adygea	5.4	10.2	13.8	18.7	31.8	—	22.7	50.2	37.3	14.08
Republic of Kalmykia	1.6	11.3	6	15.5	17.5	—	14.1	29.2	10.9	5.18
Krasnodar Krai	9.6	24.1	21.3	36.3	67.4	—	30.8	43.3	27.8	10.35
Astrakhan Oblast	4.2	2.5	11.6	44.1	32.5	—	9.7	12.9	6.8	9.8
Volgograd Oblast	3	6.6	16.1	22.7	32.8	—	8.7	17.9	13.9	21.69
Rostov Oblast	10.2	20	28.4	37.3	55	—	11.1	8.4	7.4	10.64
North Caucasus Federal District	—	—	—	—	—	—	—	—	—	15.23
Dagestan Republic	2.5	19.4	11.1	31	32.8	—	10.5	20	17.1	15.53
Republic of Ingushetia	—	4.1	6.3	12.7	22.1	—	10.4	6.7	4.8	0.73
Kabardino-Balkar Republic	14.5	36.7	35.6	47.6	34.3	—	30.8	37.6	21.1	18.39
Karachay–Cherkessia	6.7	18.5	33.9	33.2	31.8	—	48.4	45.3	15.7	12.96
Republic of North Ossetia - Alania	12.9	32.5	24	28.1	27.6	—	9.4	13	5.1	7.58
Chechen Republic	—	—	—	0	0	—	0	11.3	16.6	19.68
Stavropol Krai	8	12	16.9	20.7	24	—	22.2	23.5	20.9	16.41
Chechen and Ingush Republic	4.2	—	—	—	—	—	—	—	—	—
Volga Federal District	—	—	—	30.6	53.7	—	11.6	14.1	14.2	13.43
Republic of Bashkortostan	1	6.8	21.51	18.1	24.2	—	10	9.7	9.3	13.49
Republic of Mari El	1.1	2.2	5.2	8	21.5	—	9.2	7.9	9.7	8.61
Republic of Mordovia	1.2	2.4	2.4	4.9	19.4	—	3.3	3.6	14.6	8.12
Republic of Tatarstan	0.6	2.3	9.2	22.5	67.8	—	19.3	19.4	17.3	9.38
Udmurt Republic	0.6	2.4	3.3	6.4	13.1	—	10.2	14.7	14.4	15.23
Chuvash Republic	0.8	3	3	10.1	29.4	—	5.9	2.7	5.6	3.35
Perm Krai	0.7	5.9	26.4	35	62.1	—	25.1	44.5	35.7	29
Komi-Perm Autonomous Okrug	—	—	—	—	—	—	—	—	—	—
Kirov Oblast	0.5	1.3	1.8	1.7	9.2	—	1.4	6.1	4.2	3.65
Nizhny Novgorod Oblast	3.1	8.9	21.7	15.4	21.5	—	4.9	7.1	11.3	13.99
Orenburg Oblast	2.2	6	23	34.9	86.9	—	10.9	10.9	8.4	5.75
Penza Oblast	1.4	3.7	5.6	18.8	32.3	—	6.9	7.3	13.6	19.37
Samara Oblast	2.6	16.3	47.9	98.8	127.8	—	16.7	19.7	21.4	19.33
Saratov Oblast	0.6	5.6	17.5	40.5	63.5	—	6.4	5.9	6.2	7.29
Ulyanovsk Oblast	1.8	3.2	14	55	106.2	—	14.3	12.4	12.5	18.69
Ural Federal District	—	—	—	54.7	83.3	—	18.1	27.3	32.8	32.92
Kurgan Oblast	1.8	5.1	19	58.6	81.9	—	11.5	35.8	26.3	31.46
Sverdlovsk Oblast	1	7.4	32.1	53.1	74.8	—	10.8	31	50.9	43.75
Tyumen Oblast	4	27.5	64.2	72.7	118.3	—	31.6	26.8	20.6	20.19
Khanty-Mansiysk Ugra-Autonomous Okrug	—	—	—	—	—	—	36.8	38.2	26.8	26.19
Yamalo-Nenets Autonomous Okrug	—	—	—	—	—	—	24.8	26.6	21	27.5
Chelyabinsk Oblast	1	5	22.6	39.6	63.1	—	16.6	20.6	23.7	32.34
Siberian Federal District	—	—	—	68	75.8	—	25.1	29.2	28.7	22.16
Altai Republic	5.1	23.2	17.4	45	42.1	—	20.1	6.3	15.4	3.89
Republic of Buryatia	2.1	1.7	7.6	11.8	38	—	6.9	3.4	7.2	7.1
Republic of Tuva	43.9	41.7	49.4	53.8	42.1	—	23.8	21	7.7	5.54
Republic of Khakassia	0.8	2.9	20.6	21.8	27.6	—	12.7	19.2	11.2	12.21
Altai Krai	3.3	13.1	58.5	71	87.4	—	22.6	35.2	37.7	25.15
Trans-Baikal Krai	3.2	4.1	6.6	12.2	18.4	—	19.4	7.3	9.2	8.58
Agin-Buryat Autonomous Okrug	—	—	—	—	—	—	0	0	—	—
Krasnoyarsk Krai	1.7	28.2	37.3	52.1	73.8	—	17	28.6	18.6	22.21
Taimyr (Dolgan-Nenets) Autonomous Okrug	—	—	—	—	—	—	7.6	15.5	—	—
Evenki Autonomous Okrug	—	—	—	—	—	—	0	5.8	—	—
Irkutsk Oblast	4.7	15.6	63.2	90.6	121.5	—	50.6	43.4	39.4	23.58
Ust-Orda Buryat Autonomous Okrug	—	—	—	—	—	—	7.4	9.7	—	—
Kemerovo Oblast	3.7	22.2	51.1	111.5	98.6	—	38.5	52.9	51.9	37.57
Novosibirsk Oblast	5.1	19.9	54.5	61.7	69.8	—	26.4	27.1	34.3	30.54
Omsk Oblast	1	7.4	32.5	69.5	63.9	—	4.2	12.7	16	10.82
Tomsk Oblast	5.1	19.5	81.4	94.1	58	—	22.8	13.9	15.4	13.12
Far East Federal District	—	—	—	38.5	53.7	—	23.7	20.1	20.6	23.05
Republic of Sakha (Yakutia)	3.9	7	21.6	17.9	35.7	—	6.8	7.5	9.5	9.6
Kamchatka Krai	4.7	4.6	2.9	10.3	19.7	—	4.2	4.3	3.8	4.97
Koryak Autonomous Okrug	—	—	—	—	—	—	0	0	—	—
Primorsky Krai	11.6	11	36.8	54.8	97.8	—	46.1	29.4	27.5	30.62
Khabarovsk Krai	9	13.4	28.1	56.2	54.4	—	8.2	8.8	10.3	10.7
Amur Oblast	12.4	17.9	24.8	31.1	27.4	—	24.4	27.2	28.4	38.42
Magadan Oblast	3.7	12.4	14.6	23.3	12.3	—	22.1	34.7	29.2	20.31
Sakhalin Oblast	5.2	9.5	8.3	12.4	20.3	—	21.9	34.8	36.8	40.49
Jewish Autonomous Oblast	12.8	15	19.8	21.3	20.9	—	25.9	15	28	26.59
Chukotka Autonomous Okrug	0.7	6.2	1.1	0	7.8	—	7.8	4	2	0

== Alcoholism ==
Federal subject	1992	1994	1996	1998	2000	2002	2004	2006	2008	2010
Russia	103.3	161.6	139.6	110.9	130.6	152.3	151.9	135.3	122.2	107.69
Central Federal District	—	—	—	112.5	133.2	—	146	131.1	119.8	99.74
Belgorod Oblast	147.4	141.2	132.3	116.2	136	—	114.6	93.2	92.3	86.28
Bryansk Oblast	130.3	178	160	152.2	162.4	—	274.9	231.8	225.8	182.2
Vladimir Oblast	109.9	139.9	129.5	98.9	134.9	—	203.1	161.5	145	133.39
Voronezh Oblast	97.8	132.1	120.8	99	136.2	—	151.2	172.4	156.1	126.56
Ivanovo Oblast	143.7	182.8	179.8	171.7	216.5	—	246.5	204.9	181.9	167.78
Kaluga Oblast	140	182	120.4	102.1	129.3	—	180.7	161.5	165.5	127.13
Kostroma Oblast	134.7	158	145	90.1	111	—	140	130.8	107.8	117.07
Kursk Oblast	114.3	201.1	185.3	168.2	176.4	—	197.3	209	204.9	135.24
Lipetsk Oblast	130.7	188.3	203.7	161.4	204.9	—	241.3	207.1	184.1	135.51
Moscow Oblast	104.7	185.3	146.1	99.8	125.2	—	138.6	118.7	109.7	84.64
Oryol Oblast	184.6	218.8	201.9	164.5	176.9	—	142.3	126	109.8	148.22
Ryazan Oblast	123	178.3	110.3	107.8	123.5	—	174.4	145	127.1	117.09
Smolensk Oblast	145	232.8	173.5	160.1	195.5	—	228.1	204.3	192.9	152.67
Tambov Oblast	137.5	172.3	130.4	118.8	134.2	—	161.1	136	142.2	110.51
Tver Oblast	153.2	230.4	152.4	127	152.9	—	205.2	183.7	149.3	117.2
Tula Oblast	74.7	160.4	158	104.4	148.9	—	165.9	171.6	169.3	118.7
Yaroslavl Oblast	122.2	229.3	195.9	162.6	176.1	—	166.7	143.8	144.1	127.01
Moscow	82.5	119.4	121.1	78.9	81.1	—	71.5	66.9	55.7	56.84
North-West Federal District	—	—	—	108.1	131.1	—	151.4	129.1	112.2	99.19
Republic of Karelia	137.2	226.5	164.6	130.6	202.8	—	269.7	239.2	185.3	212.51
Komi Republic	115.4	238.4	136.4	130.2	202.3	—	244.1	208.4	219.2	181.73
Arkhangelsk Oblast	68.8	127.9	116.7	71.2	70	—	135.6	115.2	89.8	101.42
Nenets Autonomous Okrug	—	—	—	—	—	—	281.6	321.6	304.6	244.09
Vologda Oblast	137.8	219.2	148.8	96.5	98.8	—	148.3	131.2	123.7	104.18
Kaliningrad Oblast	89.6	137.6	109.2	106.9	115.9	—	133.1	109.9	101	92.34
Leningrad Oblast	157.9	229.6	200.2	162.9	181.9	—	187.6	144.7	127.9	114.4
Murmansk Oblast	109.8	194.1	80.1	87.4	90.3	—	135.6	141.3	131.1	118.26
Novgorod Oblast	135.8	252.9	228.7	173.8	219.3	—	250.2	225.6	206.3	136.99
Pskov Oblast	171.5	276.8	193.7	173.9	228.8	—	195	178.3	181.5	167.02
St. Petersburg	95.9	158.2	115.4	77.4	93.4	—	90.6	72.9	51.1	45.29
South Federal District (to 2009)	—	—	—	77.1	85.9	—	100.5	87.4	79.7	—
Southern Federal District (from 2010)	—	—	—	—	—	—	—	—	—	83.39
Republic of Adygea	133.4	126.7	73.8	77.6	81	—	109.5	126.7	132.8	129.9
Republic of Kalmykia	69.4	127.7	110.4	104.9	73.8	—	157.8	92.7	111.3	94
Krasnodar Krai	76.9	126.3	102.7	99.7	107.1	—	119.9	99.1	96.7	78.04
Astrakhan Oblast	117.3	168	228.2	127	141.7	—	160.1	166	116.1	113
Volgograd Oblast	139.2	168.8	129.1	71.9	91.8	—	180.1	137.9	116	92.71
Rostov Oblast	66.9	104	85.4	66.3	90.9	—	109.5	100.9	86.6	71.73
North Caucasus Federal District	—	—	—	—	—	—	—	—	—	43.58
Dagestan Republic	17.9	182.4	39.8	47.3	36	—	33.8	37.7	31.9	29.3
Republic of Ingushetia	—	4.1	2.3	1.3	2.2	—	1.9	2.9	0.6	0.49
Kabardino-Balkar Republic	41.1	72.4	86	111.2	102.6	—	94.8	85.8	81.6	86.25
Karachay–Cherkessia	58.4	105.9	123.4	94.8	116.9	—	97.8	69.8	81.9	75.85
Republic of North Ossetia - Alania	34.2	73.2	71	84.3	91.9	—	68.2	66.4	78.8	62.58
Chechen Republic	—	—	—	—	—	—	0	25.1	40	14.3
Stavropol Krai	62.5	81.9	64.3	52.9	54.2	—	76.4	58.8	55.6	54.81
Chechen and Ingush Republic	15.3	—	—	—	—	—	—	—	—	—
Volga Federal District	—	—	—	120.7	142.4	—	166.4	148.9	131.6	117.88
Republic of Bashkortostan	115	136.5	124.8	108.8	114.4	—	140.7	130.4	113.4	103.95
Republic of Mari El	71.6	130.4	81.5	54.5	79.1	—	136.2	144.5	143.2	122.08
Republic of Mordovia	108.4	169.6	129.8	144.5	162.2	—	213.3	176.4	166.6	136.56
Republic of Tatarstan	87.3	120.8	130.4	99.4	119.7	—	132.9	108.4	77.8	74.52
Udmurt Republic	92.1	133.7	101	91.1	112	—	147.1	117.9	116.2	120.07
Chuvash Republic	86.8	153.5	141.1	167.9	180.5	—	208.7	178.7	167	129.72
Perm Krai	88.5	186.2	189.2	155.8	221.8	—	260.8	241.7	178.9	156.43
Komi-Perm Autonomous Okrug	—	—	—	—	—	—	—	—	—	—
Kirov Oblast	106	167.4	149.4	114.2	145.8	—	222.3	148.6	148.8	126.13
Nizhny Novgorod Oblast	107.5	212.8	185.2	153.5	159.3	—	148.4	124.5	111.5	93.33
Orenburg Oblast	85.3	121.3	93.9	107.6	149.3	—	187.2	167.6	147.9	150.19
Penza Oblast	116.4	175.5	123.9	149.8	133.8	—	211	234	228.8	170.75
Samara Oblast	101.9	138.8	166.4	105.5	137.4	—	141.4	133.3	118.9	110.28
Saratov Oblast	79.3	102.3	94.8	81.6	95.1	—	109.4	114.3	118.2	110.05
Ulyanovsk Oblast	73.2	157.5	156.3	166.6	189.4	—	186.3	169.5	161.1	162.58
Ural Federal District	—	—	—	108.9	137.1	—	156.9	143.3	138.3	126.09
Kurgan Oblast	151.9	214.6	151.6	118.6	135.9	—	161	173.5	153.3	143.58
Sverdlovsk Oblast	96.5	138.4	112.4	70.7	122	—	133.9	107.3	122	120.42
Tyumen Oblast	154.3	247	275.5	169.6	175.7	—	177.3	166.5	149.8	131.29
Khanty-Mansiysk Ugra-Autonomous Okrug	—	—	—	—	—	—	174	165.2	159.5	138.54
Yamalo-Nenets Autonomous Okrug	—	—	—	—	—	—	226.1	175.6	158.9	175.48
Chelyabinsk Oblast	130.1	167.4	145.5	100.8	122	—	165.4	157.9	143.4	123.44
Siberian Federal District	—	—	—	124.5	136.7	—	169	151.2	139.2	124.36
Altai Republic	89.3	153.2	247.9	178.3	116.9	—	194.1	240.6	132.6	95.8
Republic of Buryatia	79.8	59.3	87.7	72.1	56.9	—	101.3	68.6	103.5	57.01
Republic of Tuva	73	143.5	161	236	150.3	—	187.3	95.5	99.4	115.1
Republic of Khakassia	48.1	109	90.3	103.3	66.5	—	213.9	168.2	122	134.74
Altai Krai	124.1	144.2	143.3	144.5	213.7	—	240.5	202.4	199.8	168.63
Trans-Baikal Krai	41.9	107	76.5	61.8	84.2	—	211.9	161.5	149.3	136.41
Agin-Buryat Autonomous Okrug	—	—	—	—	—	—	106.7	113.8	—	—
Krasnoyarsk Krai	147.7	231	197.2	162.5	194.4	—	209.7	173.5	165.2	156.34
Taimyr (Dolgan-Nenets) Autonomous Okrug	—	—	—	—	—	—	705.1	351.6	—	—
Evenki Autonomous Okrug	—	—	—	—	—	—	383.5	437.9	—	—
Irkutsk Oblast	155.9	270.1	235	224.6	184.9	—	225.2	222.5	185.9	190.92
Ust-Orda Buryat Autonomous Okrug	—	—	—	—	—	—	153.3	207.7	—	—
Kemerovo Oblast	112.7	170.1	146.2	112.1	140	—	148.9	143.4	116.8	100.56
Novosibirsk Oblast	76.1	165.3	135.2	71.9	86.2	—	106.7	102.2	94.7	71.63
Omsk Oblast	55.9	98.4	90.9	60.1	58.7	—	65.9	79.4	100.5	83.2
Tomsk Oblast	97.3	142.8	122.2	102.5	111.6	—	139.7	132.2	101	108.62
Far East Federal District	—	—	—	124.8	165.1	—	235.8	214.1	180.7	189.94
Republic of Sakha (Yakutia)	189.1	259.3	232.3	191.6	336.2	—	265.9	292.9	286.8	290.43
Kamchatka Krai	154.3	265.7	226	167.8	211.3	—	200.3	184.4	169.2	199.27
Koryak Autonomous Okrug	—	—	—	—	—	—	323.7	441.4	—	—
Primorsky Krai	74	144.5	130.2	98	112.4	—	128.4	129.6	111.8	118.71
Khabarovsk Krai	99.3	140.5	125.8	84.9	137	—	214	166.4	133.8	145.72
Amur Oblast	57.3	111.5	119.2	85.6	97.2	—	170.1	159	113.3	145.62
Magadan Oblast	185.5	284.6	314.7	370.2	384.7	—	602.2	536.9	528	351.61
Sakhalin Oblast	156.6	246.8	315.5	165	169.1	—	631.5	506.2	329.7	346.34
Jewish Autonomous Oblast	72.3	84.5	37.2	42.6	68.2	—	226.1	193.5	253.9	262.47
Chukotka Autonomous Okrug	233.4	413.1	287.4	194.7	190.9	—	595.3	552.4	527.1	589.13

== See also ==
- Healthcare in Russia
- Alcoholism in Russia
- Drug trafficking in Russia
