= Crime in Russia =

- Homicide: 7.8 (2024)
- Assault: 13.0 (2020)
- Kidnapping: 0.2 (2020)
- Robbery: 4.6 (2019)
- Burglary: 95.2 (2020)
- Theft: 466.6 (2020)
- Fraud: 226.0 (2020)
- Corruption: 21.1 (2020)
- Bribery: 11.0 (2020)
- Rape: 5.8 (2020)
- Sexual assault: 7.0 (2020)
- reported annually per 100,000 inhabitants

Crime in Russia refers to the multivalent issues of organized crime, extensive political and police corruption, and all aspects of criminality at play in Russia. Violent crime in Siberia is much more apparent than in Western Russia.

== Historical trends ==

Comparison of the crime rates of the Soviet Union with those of other nations is considered difficult, because the Soviet Union did not publish comprehensive crime statistics. According to Western experts, robberies, homicide and other violent crimes were less prevalent in the Soviet Union than in the United States because the Soviet Union had a larger police force, strict gun controls, and had a low occurrence of drug abuse. However, white-collar crime was prevalent in the Soviet system. Corruption in the form of bribery was common, primarily due to the paucity of goods and services on the open market.

Theft of state property (embezzlement) by state employees was also common. When Mikhail Gorbachev was the General Secretary of the CPSU, an effort was made to stop white-collar crime. Revelations of corruption scandals involving high-level employees of the Communist Party of the Soviet Union were published regularly in the news media of the Soviet Union, and many arrests and prosecutions resulted from such discoveries. An article published in the Izvestia in 1994 described the difference between the situation of crime in the Soviet Union and post-Soviet Russia:

Crime was never able to gain enough strength to compete with the state's law enforcement system. The criminal world had ties with the police, but it was all kept deeply hidden. Money had influence, but it was not all-powerful. Laundering the profits from crime was difficult, and spending the profits equally so. There were millionaires, but they were underground. There were gangs - but to get weapons they had to run numerous risks. We had it all. But it was all under the surface.

The crime rate in Russia sharply increased during the late 1980s. The fall of Marxist-Leninist governments in Eastern Europe had tremendous influence on the political economy of organized crime.

=== Post Soviet ===
The collapse of the Soviet Union destroyed much of the systems and infrastructures that provided social security and a minimal standard of living for the population, and law and order across the country broke down resulting in outbreak of crime. In the transition to a free market economy, production fell and there was huge capital flight coupled with low foreign investment.

Due to these factors, economic instability increased and a newly impoverished population emerged, accompanied by unemployment and unpaid wages. Extreme poverty as well as unpaid wages resulted in an increase in theft and counterfeiting. Since the dissolution of the Soviet Union, organized criminal groups in Russia and other former Soviet republics have been involved in different illegal activities such as drug trafficking, arms trafficking, car theft, human trafficking and money laundering being the most common.

From 1991 to 1992, the number of both officially reported crimes and the overall crime rate increased by 27%. By the early 1990s, theft, burglary, and other property crimes accounted for nearly two-thirds of all crime in the country. There was a rapid growth of violent crime, including homicides. There was the burgeoning black market of firearms, many of them were pilfered from stockpiles of the former Soviet Army.

In the 1990s in Russia, as well as in other post-Soviet countries, vast deposits of natural resources and businesses that the state had owned for decades were privatised. Former Soviet bureaucrats, factory directors, aggressive businessmen and criminal organizations used insider deals, bribery and simple brute force in order to grab lucrative assets. Russia's new capitalists spent millions of dollars for protection. However, almost every business in Russia, from curbside vendors to huge oil and gas companies, made payments to the organized crime for protection ("krysha"). Businessmen said that they needed the "krysha" because the laws and the court system were not functioning properly in Russia. The only way for them to enforce a contract was to turn to a criminal "krysha". They also used it to intimidate competitors, enforce contracts, collect debts or take over new markets. It was also becoming increasingly common for Russian businesses to turn to the "red krysha" (the corrupt police who doubled as a paid protection racket). Contract killings were common.

The internationalization of the Russian Mafia along with the Sicilian Mafia, the Camorra, the Triads and the Yakuza played a vital role in the development of transnational crime involving Russia.

After the economic situation improved since the beginning of the 2000s, crime in Russia has taken a sharp decline.

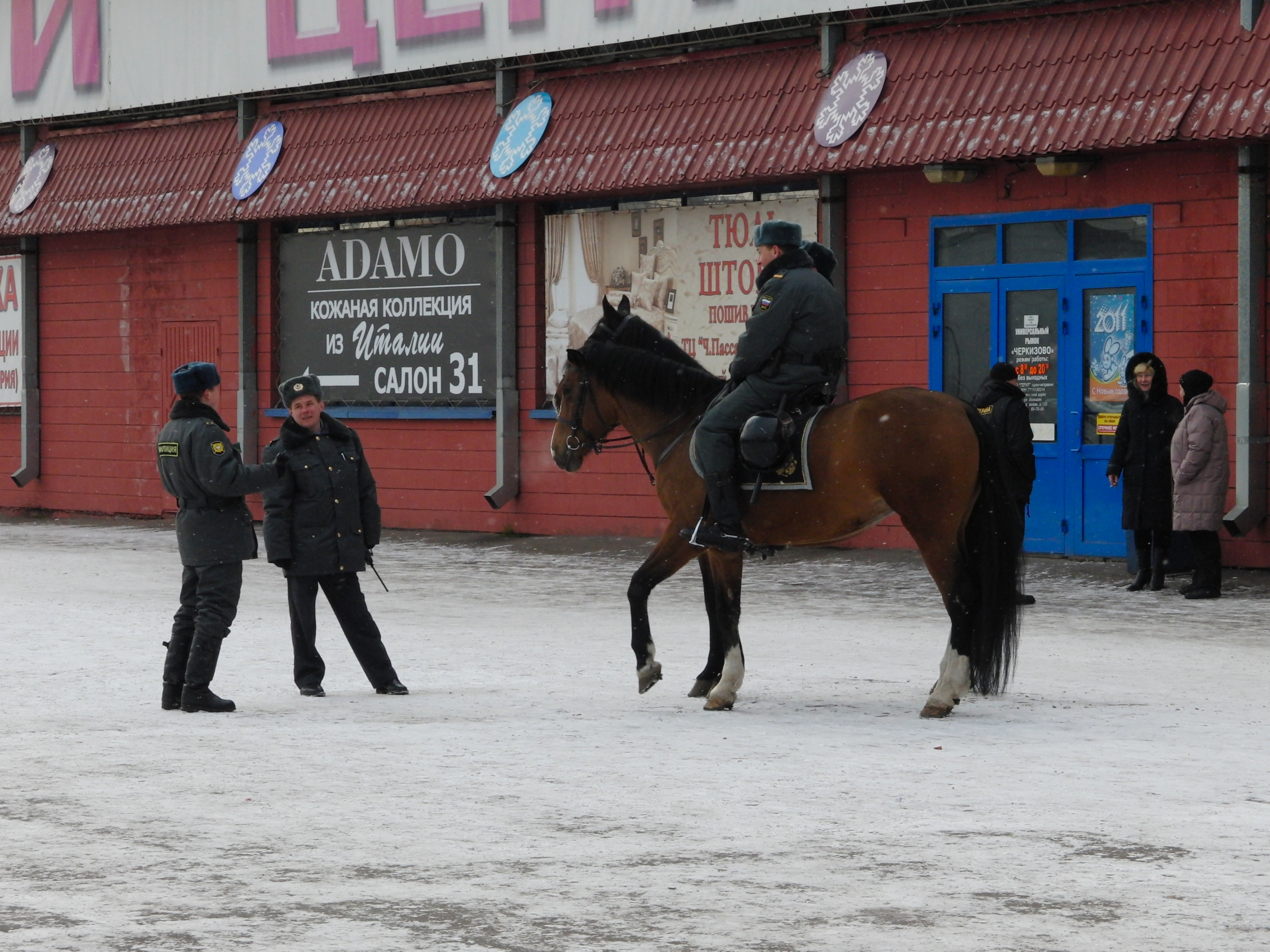
Russian police on a street at Cherkizovskaya, Moscow

== Crime by type ==
=== Murder ===
In 2020, the murder rate in Russia was 4.7 per 100,000 people, according to Rosstat (the Russian Federal State Statistics Service). According to the United Nations Office on Drugs and Crime (UNODC), the homicide rate was 7.3 in 2020 compared to 10.9 in 2016, a significant decrease over the previous 20 years (in 2000, the homicide rate was 28.1), and only slightly higher than the United States (6.3). In 2017, Moscow recorded the lowest crime rate in over a decade.

At the beginning of the 20th century, Russia had a higher homicide rate – nearly ten per 100,000 people per year. In the late 1950s and early 1960s, the rate remained stable and it was lower than in the United States. There was a rise in the homicide rate in the mid-1960s and 1970s which peaked in 1980, and then slowly declined in until 1985, and then it fell rapidly in 1986–1987.

Until the late 1980s, homicide rates in Russia were nearly similar to that in the United States. The increase in homicide rate in Russia began slightly earlier than 1990, and rose throughout the 1990s. Homicides were more common in Russia than in the Baltic states in 1991 and nearly doubled in frequency by 1994–1995. In 2003, the homicide rate in Russia was among the highest in the world. However, by 2017, homicide rate in Russia had fallen by 75%.

In the early 1980s, an estimated "two-thirds of murders and violent crimes were committed by intoxicated persons". In 1995, about three quarters of those arrested for homicide were under the influence of alcohol. According to Russia's health minister, alcohol consumption fell by 80% from 2013 to 2018.

==== Statistics ====
Below is a comparison of the homicide rate in Russia from 1990 to 2018:

| Year | Total homicides | Homicide rate |
|---|---|---|
| 1990 | 15,600 | 14.29 |
| 1991 | 16,200 | 15.24 |
| 1992 | 23,000 | 22.83 |
| 1993 | 29,200 | 30.35 |
| 1994 | 32,300 | 32.26 |
| 1995 | 31,700 | 30.50 |
| 1996 | 29,400 | 26.38 |
| 1997 | 29,300 | 23.66 |
| 1998 | 29,600 | 22.72 |
| 1999 | 31,100 | 25.97 |
| 2000 | 31,200 | 28.03 |
| 2001 | 33,600 | 29.40 |
| 2002 | 44,252 | 30.45 |
| 2003 | 41,764 | 28.87 |
| 2004 | 39,256 | 27.25 |
| 2005 | 35,636 | 24.83 |
| 2006 | 28,513 | 19.93 |
| 2007 | 24,885 | 17.43 |
| 2008 | 23,427 | 16.41 |
| 2009 | 21,121 | 14.79 |
| 2010 | 18,660 | 13.06 |
| 2011 | 16,406 | 11.48 |
| 2012 | 14,945 | 10.44 |
| 2013 | 13,912 | 9.69 |
| 2014 | 12,561 | 8.60 |
| 2015 | 11,679 | 7.98 |
| 2016 | 10,331 | 7.04 |
| 2017 | 8,844 | 6.02 |
| 2018 | 7,609 | 5.18 |
| 2019 | 7,212 | 4.9 |

The age pattern of homicide victimization rates in Russia is different compared to that of the United States. In 2001, 32% of the homicide victims in Russia were under the age of thirty-five, and 30% of the victims were fifty years or older. There is a wide range of variation in homicide rates throughout Russia. The homicide rate is relatively high in Siberia and Russian Far East compared to European Russia.

=== Drug trafficking ===
Drug trafficking and illicit drug use is a significant problem in Russia. The disintegration of the Soviet Union, the civil war in Afghanistan, the civil war in Tajikistan, and the conflicts in the North Caucasus have made the favorable conditions for the development of illegal drug trade. In the early 1990s, use of cocaine was increasingly noted among the young population of the nation.

In the mid-1990s, the growing drug abuse that appeared in Russia was caused by lack of border controls, and the country became one of the world's major transit corridors of drug trafficking. The entrance of producers of cocaine of South America in the Russian market was proved by intercepting cocaine shipments in Saint Petersburg in 1993. As of 1996 internal production of narcotic substances was also rising in Russia.

A limited quantity of illicit cannabis is cultivated in the country. Opium poppies and marijuana are cultivated illegally in the Southern Federal District. Russia is one of the two major drug producers along with Morocco, and one of the five major drug trafficking entry points along with Iran, Turkey, Italy and Spain in the Mediterranean region. The drug trafficking also involves the supply of opium, heroin and marijuana from Central Asia and the Golden Crescent, comprising Pakistan, Afghanistan and Iran.

Russian drug rings work with the Sicilian Mafia and the Colombian drug traffickers to import and distribute cocaine. Many local Russian distributors have connections with criminal organizations in Central Asia, the Caucasus, and Ukraine. According to the Moscow State Institute of International Relations, a regular trafficking route exists from Tajikistan to Rostov-on-Don via Turkmenistan, and from there to Western Europe. Below are some drug-trafficking routes through the Russian Federation:

| Name of Drug | Source country | Destination country |
|---|---|---|
| Poppy straw | Belarus, Lithuania, Moldova, Ukraine | Estonia, Poland |
| Opium | Afghanistan, Azerbaijan, Kyrgyzstan, Pakistan, Tajikistan, Turkmenistan, Uzbekistan | Canada, Europe, Japan, US |
| Heroin | Afghanistan, Azerbaijan, Kyrgyzstan, Pakistan, Tajikistan, Turkmenistan, Uzbekistan | Australia, Canada, Europe, Israel, Japan, US |
| Cannabis | Afghanistan, Azerbaijan, Kazakhstan, Kyrgyzstan, Turkmenistan, Uzbekistan | Canada, China, Europe, Japan, Republic of Korea, US |
| Cocaine | Bolivia, Brazil, Colombia, Europe, Venezuela, US | Europe, Ghana, Oman, South Africa, Zambia |

Between 1993 and 1995, the annual amount of seized narcotic substances increased from thirty-five tons to ninety tons. At present approximately 5 million people use illicit drugs in Russia. Russia has the biggest heroin problem along with Iran and Estonia.

Several measures have been taken by the government to combat drug trafficking. Russia is a party of the 1988 United Nations Convention Against Illicit Traffic in Narcotic Drugs and Psychotropic Substances. In 1994, when Boris Yeltsin was the President of Russia, a committee was founded for coordination of drug policy. In 1995, a three-year counternarcotics program was approved for establishing drug treatment facilities, criminalization of drug abuse, extensions of sentences for drug trafficking, and establishment of pharmaceuticals-monitoring process.

In two major anti-drug operations in 1997, fifty metric tons of narcotic substances were seized and approximately 1,400 criminal organizations engaged in drug trafficking were disrupted or destroyed. In March 2003, Russian President Vladimir Putin established the Russian State Committee for Control over the Illegal Trafficking of Narcotics and Psychotropic Substances for combating drug trafficking with more coordinated manner.

=== Human trafficking ===
Russia is a supply, transit, and destination country for men, women, and children being trafficked for various purposes. The trafficking is multidimensional and it involves both commercial sexual exploitation and labor exploitation. Russia is a significant source of women trafficked to over 50 nations. Internal trafficking is a problem in the country; women are trafficked from rural areas to urban settlements for commercial sexual exploitation. Men are trafficked internally and from Central Asia for forced labor in the construction and agricultural industries. Debt bondage is common among the trafficking victims.

=== Arms trafficking ===
Arms trafficking has become a significant problem in the Russian Federation following the disintegration of the Soviet Union. The former Eastern Bloc countries (including Russia) are the source of the majority of illegal weapons in circulation around the world. Illegal arms possession is a problem in many regions in the nation, especially in the areas suffering from insurgency such as Chechnya and Dagestan.

Because of the general weakening of the government control and the decentralization of power in the nation in the first half of the 1990s, small arms from several military units and arsenals made their way into the hands of civilians and local unofficial armed formations. Gunrunning in Russia stemmed from corruption in the armed forces and the illegal sale of military equipment. It has been suggested that parts of the Ministry of Defence of the Russian Federation and arms industry were engaged in arms trafficking with the Chechen separatists.

Russian troops play an important role in arms trafficking especially in the war zones. Poor salary for service persons coupled with lack of control over weapon storage resulted in troop involvement in illegal arms trade. The Chief of the General Staff Anatoly Kvashnin publicly stated in 2003 that increasing corruption left the Russian military in a "post-critical state".

There have been accusations and counter-accusations between Russia and Georgia regarding illegal arms selling to Chechen separatists. Russia alleged that Chechen separatists received weapons through illegal networks going to Chechnya through Georgia and Azerbaijan. On the other hand, Georgia accused Russia of corruption on military bases, poor security infrastructure and low professionalism among Russian troops as the reasons behind the spread of illegal weapons.

The types of firearms in illegal possession varies throughout the nation: in Siberia unregistered hunting rifles are the primarily found illegal weapons while in Chechnya the predominant illicit arms are illegally held military weapons. Small arms are illegally proliferated from the main centers of small arms manufacturing, Tula and Izhevsk. In 2003 an estimated 300,000 to 1.5 million illegal arms were in circulation within Russia.

According to the statistics from the Supreme Court of the Russian Federation, 1.5 times more people were arrested for gunrunning in 2001 than in 2000; in total 26,113 arrests were made and 65,000 crimes were committed using illegal arms. In 2000, the number of seized unregistered firearms was 300,000, which was a 37% increase compared with 1999. Many Russian criminal organizations, aside from arms trafficking in Russia, provide weapons to the separatists groups in Chechnya.

However several attempts were made to combat arms trafficking. Small arms manufacturers in the country have tightened their security systems. Special prosecutors’ offices, which were originally set up in the 1950s for supervising secrecy in nuclear facilities, have been given the responsibility of the security of defense plants and curbing the theft of small arms from the plants. The Government of Russia has undertaken a program to increase security at arms storage facilities at military bases.

=== Poaching ===
Poaching was extremely uncommon in the Soviet Union, but has recently become a significant problem in the country. The main cause for poaching in Russia is the consequence of the social and political changes since the dissolution of the Soviet Union. State-controlled farms stopped functioning due to the fall of communism resulting in high unemployment. Unemployment, poverty, inflation, shortage of food and demand for foreign currency have major impact on the wildlife in the country.

Between 1992 and 1996, law enforcement agencies in Russia mainly focused on drug trafficking, arms trafficking, money laundering and the First Chechen War. Environmental crimes like poaching and illegal timber smuggling were generally not treated as national security issues. During the post-perestroika transition, the government agencies for environment and wildlife protection experienced severe budget cuts which led to layoffs and salary reductions for wildlife rangers in places like Primorski Krai and it reduced the resources of the rangers to fight against the poachers. Animals being poached in the country are bear, musk deer, tiger etc. Approximately 50,000 cases of poaching are registered annually. According to the tiger experts and enforcement officers in Russia, the characteristics of tiger poaching in Russia are:

- Tiger poaching is carried out by two sets of poachers: organized poaching gangs and opportunistic poachers.
- Poaching of the tiger's prey base (i.e. wild pig and deer) occur for the consumption of the local population.
- The poachers generally sell the tiger parts to middlemen operating out of the cities like Vladivostok, Khabarovsk, Ussuriysk, Nakhodka and Plastun.
- The middlemen who buy or sell tiger parts are generally Russians, ethnic Koreans, or Chinese.
- Most tiger parts are being smuggled to the People's Republic of China, South Korea and Japan.

It is believed that sharp increase in poaching in the first half of the 1990s resulted in rapid decrease of the Siberian tiger population. According to estimation, there were 330 to 371 adult Siberian tigers in the Russian Far East in 1996 while the number was 600 at the end of the 1980s. During the communist rule, borders were closed and access to the Asian demand for tiger products was almost non-existent. Due to this, from 1972 to 1992, poaching was not reported.

The collapse of the Soviet Union resulted in easing of border controls and gun laws, and it became an urgent need for the villagers to earn income in a destroyed economy with high inflation. Almost immediately tigers became similar to a profitable cash crop at a time when there was huge demand for tiger parts for Traditional Chinese medicine. Data obtained from field examinations, skin confiscations and from radio-collared animals indicated that 58%-73% tiger deaths were related to poaching. Poaching of tigers apparently peaked in the early 1990s.

The collapse of the Marxist–Leninist government in the country had a significant influence on the average Russian's economic ability to maintain his or her family. Because of the large population of bears in Russia and an increasing demand for bear parts, especially bile, poaching of bears became increasingly popular. Its main trade partners in bear parts are primarily nearby Asian countries like South Korea and the People's Republic of China. Poaching of the snow leopard is also a serious problem in Russia along with Afghanistan, India, Kazakhstan, Kyrgyzstan, Mongolia, Nepal, Pakistan, People's Republic of China, Tajikistan and Uzbekistan. The situation for antelopes has deteriorated significantly since the collapse of the Soviet system. There has been increase in poaching of the saiga antelope which reduced the saiga population in the country.

However several attempts were made to combat commercial poaching of animals. Operation Amba, started to curtail the poaching of Siberian tigers in the Russian Far East, is credited for bringing the Amur tiger back from the brink of extinction in the mid-1990s.

Major General Vitaly Ivanovich Gamov, a Deputy Commander of the Pacific Regional Directorate of the Border Guard Service of Russia, was killed in 2002 in his house after refusing to take bribes and allow poachers to outsource their recourse to Japan.

In January 2009, the Altaigate Scandal developed after the Plenipotentiary of the Russian President in the State Duma was killed along with 6 other officials in the helicopter crash accident (poaching for legally protected argali mountain sheep) and an entire investigation was concealed from the public.

=== Corruption ===
In Russia's criminal legislation, "corruption" is not defined as a specific crime, but a collective term which include bribery, abuse of office and others. It is accepted in both inside and outside the country that corruption is widespread in Russia. Corruption is often considered as a major factor behind economic problems in the nation. According to a survey conducted by the Economist Intelligence Unit in 1997, the Commonwealth of Independent States was the most corrupt region in the world, with Russia (along with the other four CIS countries surveyed) received the maximum rating for corruption among public officials.

In the Corruption Perceptions Index 2007, Russia was ranked 143rd out of 179 countries for corruption (least corrupt countries are at the top of the list). On a scale of 0 to 10 with 0 the most corrupt and 10 the most transparent, Transparency International rated Russia 2.3. Corruption in Russia is often divided into two broad categories: "petty" corruption, where low-ranking government officials are engaged in bribery, and "high-level" corruption involving political and business elite. Below are selected official data on corruption in Russia from 1997 to 2003:

| Year | 1997 | 1998 | 1999 | 2000 | 2001 | 2002 | 2003 |
|---|---|---|---|---|---|---|---|
| Embezzlement (prisvoenie or rastrata) | - | - | - | - | 46,848 | 43,859 | 44,706 |
| Bribery (vzyatochnichestvo) | 5,068 | 5,805 | 6,823 | 7,047 | 7,909 | 7,311 | 7,346 |

Corruption in the police force is a significant problem in the country. First Deputy Minister of Internal Affairs Vladimir Vasilev claimed that 1,700 police persons were convicted of bribery or abuse of office in 2001 and the problem of corruption was under control. But according to most observers, in reality the level of police corruption is much higher and state officials like to downplay the problem of corruption.

Political analyst Andrei Piontkovsky said in an article written in early 2000 that the then current political system in Russia was "the highest stage of robber capitalism”. He believes that "Russia is not corrupt. Corruption is what happens in all countries when businessmen offer officials large bribes for favors. Today's Russia is unique. The businessmen, the politicians, and the bureaucrats are the same people. They have privatized the country's wealth and taken control of its financial flows."

Such views are also shared by former CIA director James Woolsey who said in a 1999 Congressional Statement: "I have been particularly concerned for some years, beginning during my tenure, with the interpenetration of Russian organized crime, Russian intelligence and law enforcement, and Russian business. I have often illustrated this point with the following hypothetical: If you should chance to strike up a conversation with an articulate, English-speaking Russian in, say, the restaurant of one of the luxury hotels along Lake Geneva, and he is wearing a $3,000 suit and a pair of Gucci loafers, and he tells you that he is an executive of a Russian trading company and wants to talk to you about a joint venture, then there are four possibilities. He may be what he says he is. He may be a Russian intelligence officer working under commercial cover. He may be part of a Russian organized crime group. But the really interesting possibility is that he may be all three and that none of those three institutions have any problem with the arrangement."

According to Transparency International, bribery in Russia is worth $300 billion. There have been two high-profile bribery scandals in Russia involving international companies. There was an agreement signed at an official ceremony in Moscow in which Foreign companies made a commitment not to give bribes in Russia.

== Crime dynamics ==
=== 1990s ===
Russia's economy experienced a 40% GDP decline in the 1990s, and this led to an explosion of crime. In 1990, the number of registered crime was 1.84 million. This figure increased to 2.8 million in 1993, then fell slightly. In 1996, there were a total of 2.63 million officially registered crimes, which was more than 40% higher than in 1990. In 1999, total reported crime was 3 million, and it continued to increase in 2000 and 2001, and then fell in 2002.

Among white-collar crimes, swindling increased 67.2 percent, and extortion 37.5 percent, in 1995. Among the conventional crimes reported in 1995, homicide and attempted murder increased 1.5%, rape 6.5%, burglaries 6.6%. Serious crimes by teenagers increased by 2.2 percent in 1995.

In the first four months in 1994, Russia averaged eighty-four murders per day. Many of those crimes were contract killings by criminal organizations. The 1995 national crime total exceeded 1.3 million, including 30,600 cases of homicide.

=== Recent years ===
Recently, from 2001, the number of murders and suicides in Russia have dropped by 80%.

=== By region ===
2017 was a very good year for Moscow, which saw the lowest number of crimes (140,000) in a decade. Theft, burglary and armed robbery dropped down to 38 percent since the previous year, while the murder rate dropped by 10 percent. Crime statistics of Moscow for 1995 included a total of 93,560 cases of crime, of which 18,500 were white-collar crimes, an increase of 8.3% over 1994.

The majority of car thefts were reported from Moscow and Saint Petersburg, which increased through the first half of the 1990s. In Moscow an estimated fifty cars were stolen per day, with the estimated yearly total for Russia between 100,000 and 150,000.

=== Alcohol and crime ===
In the early 1980s, an estimated "two-thirds of murders and violent crimes were committed by intoxicated persons; and drunk drivers were responsible for 14,000 traffic deaths and 60,000 serious traffic injuries". In 1995, about three quarters of those arrested for homicide were under the influence of alcohol.

A 1997 report published in the Journal of Family Violence, found that among male perpetrators of spousal homicide, 60–75% of offenders had been drinking before the incident. In a 2004 study of domestic violence in the Central Black Earth Region of Russia, 77% of offenders of violent crime towards family members were frequent drinkers - 12% engaged in regular binge drinking three or four times a month, 30% three times a week or more, and 35% every day or almost every day.

=== International comparison ===
Homicide/murder rate in Russia has fallen dramatically in the last two decades. The homicide rate in Russia more than tripled between 1988 and 1994 and was among the highest in the world. However, by 2020, the murder rate in Russia was significantly lower than in the US (4.7 versus 7.8).

| Country | Russia | Russia | Japan | Germany | United Kingdom | France | Canada | Poland | United States | Colombia | |
| Year | 2001 | 2020 | 2000 | 2000 | 2000 | 2000 | 2004 | 2000 | 2020 | 2000 | 2000 |
|---|---|---|---|---|---|---|---|---|---|---|---|
| Homicide rate | 30.5 | 4.7 | 0.500 | 1.4 | 1.406 | 1.733 | 1.9 | 5.628 | 7.8 | 49.600 | 61.785 |

=== Crime and scams against foreigners ===
The main crime for tourists to watch out for in Russia is pickpockets, which can be found at multiple places in Moscow (e.g. St. Basil's Cathedral, Red Square, Moscow Metro) and St. Petersburg (e.g. The State Hermitage Museum, Church of the Savior on Spilled Blood, Peterhof Grand Palace). Another crime that may affect tourists include fake alcohol which has been ongoing for years.

As for scams, the main ones to watch out for include taxi scams, fake amber, fake ballet tickets, and "Would you like a drink" bar scam.

== Migrant crime ==
Russian Minister of Internal Affairs Vladimir Kolokoltsev said that 80% of all criminal acts of migrants are related to drugs. According to him, involvement in criminal activity is growing in the migrant environment. The minister stressed that all Russian departments using migrant labor should tighten control over their activities.

== See also ==
- Anti-organized crime institutions in Russia
- Gopniki
- Kazan phenomenon
- Domestic violence in Russia
- History of Russia (1991–present)#"Shock therapy"
- Illegal immigration in Russia
- Novgorod case
- Russian Mafia
- Shock Doctrine
- Terrorism in Russia
- Thieves in law
