= Journal of Family Violence =

- Discipline: Family violence
- Language: English
- Edited by: Rebecca J. Macy

Publication details
- History: 1986-present
- Publisher: Springer Science+Business Media
- Frequency: Quarterly
- Impact factor: 2.183 (2020)

Standard abbreviations
- ISO 4: J. Fam. Violence

Indexing
- CODEN: JFVIEV
- ISSN: 0885-7482 (print); 1573-2851 (web)
- LCCN: 86655795
- OCLC no.: 807543324

Links
- Journal homepage; Online archive

The Journal of Family Violence is a quarterly peer-reviewed scientific journal dedicated to the study of family violence. It was established in 1986 and is published by Springer Science+Business Media. The editor-in-chief is Rebecca J. Macy (UNC School of Social Work). According to the Journal Citation Reports, the journal has a 2020 impact factor of 2.183.
