= Russia =

Country in Eastern Europe and North Asia

Russian Federation Российская Федерация
- Flag Coat of arms
- Anthem: Государственный гимн Российской Федерации; Gosudarstvennyy gimn Rossiyskoy Federatsii "State Anthem of the Russian Federation"
- Recognised territory Claimed but internationally unrecognised (Note: Crimea, which was annexed by Russia in 2014, remains internationally recognised as a part of Ukraine. Donetsk, Luhansk, Kherson, and Zaporizhzhia oblasts, which were annexed—though are only partially occupied—in 2022, also remain internationally recognised as a part of Ukraine. The southernmost Kuril Islands have been the subject of a territorial dispute with Japan since their occupation by the Soviet Union at the end of World War II.)
- Capital and largest city: Moscow; 55°45′21″N 37°37′02″E
- Official languages: Russian
- Recognised regional languages: Various
- Ethnic groups (2021; including Crimea): 71.7% Russian; 3.2% Tatar; 1.1% Bashkir; 1.1% Chechen; 11.3% other; 11.6% not reported
- Demonym: Russian
- Government: Federal semi-presidential republic under an authoritarian government
  - President: Vladimir Putin
  - Prime Minister: Mikhail Mishustin
- Legislature: Federal Assembly
  - Upper house: Federation Council
  - Lower house: State Duma

Formation
  - Kievan Rus': 882
  - Vladimir-Suzdal: 1125
  - Grand Principality of Moscow: 1263
  - Tsardom of Russia: 16 January 1547
  - Russian Empire: 2 November 1721
  - Monarchy abolished: 15 March 1917
  - Soviet Union: 30 December 1922
  - Declaration of State Sovereignty: 12 June 1990
  - Belovezha Accords ratifed: 12 December 1991
  - Current constitution: 12 December 1993

Area
  - Total: 17,098,246 km^{2} (6,601,670 sq mi) (within internationally recognised borders) (1st)
  - Water (%): 13 (including swamps)

Population
  - 2025 estimate: ▼146,028,325; (including Crimea); ▼143,569,049; (excluding Crimea); (9th)
  - Density: 8.4/km^{2} (21.8/sq mi) (187th)
- GDP (PPP): 2026 estimate
  - Total: ▲$7.543 trillion (4th)
  - Per capita: ▲$52,602 (43rd)
- GDP (nominal): 2026 estimate
  - Total: ▲$2.861 trillion (8th)
  - Per capita: ▲$19,953 (63rd)
- Gini (2020): ▼36.0 medium inequality
- HDI (2023): ▲0.832 very high (64th)
- Currency: Russian ruble (₽) (RUB)
- Time zone: UTC+2 to +12
- Calling code: +7
- ISO 3166 code: RU
- Internet TLD: .ru; .рф

Russia, (Note: Russian: Россия, romanised: Rossiya, IPA: [rɐˈsʲijə]) or the Russian Federation, (Note: Russian: Российская Федерация, romanised: Rossiyskaya Federatsiya, IPA: [rɐˈsʲijskəjə fʲɪdʲɪˈratsɨjə]) (Note: The names 'Russia' and 'Russian Federation' are declared by the constitution to be co-equal.) is a country in Eastern Europe and North Asia. It is the largest country in the world, spanning eleven time zones and sharing land borders with fourteen countries. (Note: The fourteen countries bordering Russia are Norway and Finland to the northwest; Estonia, Latvia, Belarus and Ukraine to the west, as well as Lithuania and Poland (with Kaliningrad Oblast); Georgia and Azerbaijan to the southwest; Kazakhstan and Mongolia to the south; and China and North Korea to the southeast. Russia also shares maritime boundaries with Japan and the United States, as well as borders with the two partially recognised breakaway states of South Ossetia and Abkhazia that it occupies in Georgia.) With a population of over 140 million, Russia is the most populous country in Europe and the ninth-most populous in the world. It is a highly urbanised country, with three-fourths of its population living in urban areas. Moscow, the most populous metropolitan area in Europe, is the capital and largest city of Russia, while Saint Petersburg is its second-largest city and a major cultural centre.

Human settlement on modern Russian territory dates back to the Lower Paleolithic. The emergence of the East Slavs as a prominent group in Europe between the 3rd and 8th centuries AD led to the establishment of Kievan Rus' in the 9th century, which adopted Orthodox Christianity from the Byzantine Empire in 988. Following the disintegration of Kievan Rus' in the 12th century, the Grand Principality of Moscow became the dominant Russian principality and led the unification of Russian lands during the late medieval period, culminating in the formation of the Tsardom of Russia in 1547. By the early 18th century, Russia had expanded vastly through conquest, annexation, and the efforts of Russian explorers. It was proclaimed as the Russian Empire in 1721, which became the third-largest empire in history. The Russian Revolution of 1917 led to the abolition of the Russian monarchy and the creation of the Russian SFSR, the first socialist state. Following the Russian Civil War, Russia became the largest and principal constituent of the newly established Soviet Union in 1922. Amidst rapid industrialisation in the 1930s, millions died under Joseph Stalin. The Soviet Union played a decisive role for the Allies in World War II by leading large-scale efforts on the Eastern Front. During the Cold War, it emerged as a superpower and competed with the United States for geopolitical dominance. The Soviet era saw some of the most significant Russian technological achievements, including the first human-made satellite and the first human expedition into outer space.

In 1991, the Russian SFSR emerged from the dissolution of the Soviet Union as the Russian Federation. Following a constitutional crisis in 1993, a new constitution was adopted, establishing a semi-presidential republic. Since the turn of the century, Russia's political system has been dominated by Vladimir Putin, under whose leadership it has experienced democratic backsliding, transforming into an authoritarian regime. Russia has been militarily involved in numerous conflicts, including its war with Georgia in 2008 and its war with Ukraine since 2014. The latter has involved the internationally unrecognised annexation of Crimea in 2014 and four additional regions following the Russian invasion of Ukraine in 2022, resulting in a full-scale war.

Russia is generally considered a great power and a regional power, possessing the largest stockpile of nuclear weapons and having the third-highest military expenditure in the world. Its economy ranks among the largest in the world by both nominal and PPP-adjusted GDP, relying on its vast mineral and energy resources, mainly oil and natural gas. However, Russia ranks very low in measurements of democracy, human rights and media freedom, while having high levels of systemic corruption. As the successor state of the Soviet Union, it retains its seat as a permanent member of the United Nations Security Council and is a member state of several international organisations. Russia is also home to 32 UNESCO World Heritage Sites.

== Etymology ==
According to the Oxford English Dictionary, the English name Russia first appeared in the 14th century, borrowed from Medieval Latin Russia, used in the 11th century and frequently in 12th-century British sources, in turn derived from Russi, 'the Russians' and the suffix -ia.

The oldest endonyms used were Rus' (Русь) and Russkaya zemlya (Русская земля, 'Russian land'). According to the Primary Chronicle, the word Rus' derives from the Rus' people, identified as Norsemen from present-day Sweden, from whom the Rurikid dynasty descended. The name is considered a borrowing from Finnic Ruotsi ('Sweden'), in turn derived from Old Norse rōþs- ('related to rowing'). The Greek form Rhōs (Ῥῶς), referring to a people, is first clearly attested in the Latin Annales Bertiniani under the year 839. In modern historiography, the early medieval East Slavic state is usually referred to as Kievan Rus', a name derived from its capital city. Another Medieval Latin name for Rus' was Ruthenia.

In Russian, the country's current name, Rossiya (Россия), derives from the Byzantine Greek term Rhōsía (Ῥωσία). This term is first attested in texts dating to the mid-10th century, particularly De Administrando Imperio, and subsequently became the usual Byzantine designation for Russia. The form Rosiya (Росия) in Cyrillic is first attested in 1387. It appears in Russian sources from the 15th century and began to replace the vernacular Rus' during the rise of Moscow as the centre of a unified Russian state. However, until the end of the 17th century, the country's inhabitants more commonly referred to it as Rus', Russkaya zemlya, or Moskovskoye gosudarstvo ('Muscovite state'), among other variations. The terms Russkoye tsarstvo ('Russian tsardom') and Velikaya Rossiya ('Great Russia') also became established in Russian usage during this period. In modern Russian, the name Rus' persists mainly in literary and poetic usage to refer to historical or traditional Russia.

In 1721, Peter the Great proclaimed the Russian Empire (Rossiyskaya imperiya). The name Rossiya was used as the designation for the multinational empire and then for the modern Russian state. Similarly, after the Russian Revolution and the proclamation of the Russian SFSR in 1918, the state title used rossiyskaya rather than russkaya to denote its multinational character. In December 1991, the Russian SFSR was renamed the Russian Federation (Rossiyskaya Federatsiya).

The Russian language distinguishes between ethnic Russians and Russian citizens, although the terms for both are translated into English as "Russian". The noun and adjective russkiy (русский) refer to ethnic Russians, while the adjective rossiyskiy (российский) denotes the Russian state, and by extension, Russian citizenship. The noun rossiyanin (россиянин) refers to a Russian citizen, regardless of ethnicity.

== History ==
=== Early history ===
The earliest evidence of human settlement in what is now Russia dates to the Oldowan period during the early Lower Paleolithic. About 2 million years ago, representatives of Homo erectus migrated to the Taman Peninsula in southern Russia. Flint tools, some 1.5 million years old, have been discovered in the North Caucasus. Radiocarbon dated specimens from Denisova Cave in the Altai Mountains estimate the oldest Denisovan specimen lived 195–122,700 years ago. Fossils of Denny, an archaic human hybrid that was half Neanderthal and half Denisovan, and lived some 90,000 years ago, was also found within the latter cave. Russia was home to some of the last surviving Neanderthals, from about 45,000 years ago, found in Mezmaiskaya cave.

The first trace of an early modern human in Russia dates back to 45,000 years, in Western Siberia. The discovery of high concentration cultural remains of anatomically modern humans, from at least 40,000 years ago, was found at Kostyonki–Borshchyovo, and at Sungir, dating back to 34,600 years ago—both in western Russia. Humans reached Arctic Russia at least 40,000 years ago, in Mamontovaya Kurya. Ancient North Eurasian populations from Siberia genetically similar to Mal'ta–Buret' culture and Afontova Gora were an important genetic contributor to Ancient Native Americans and Eastern Hunter-Gatherers.

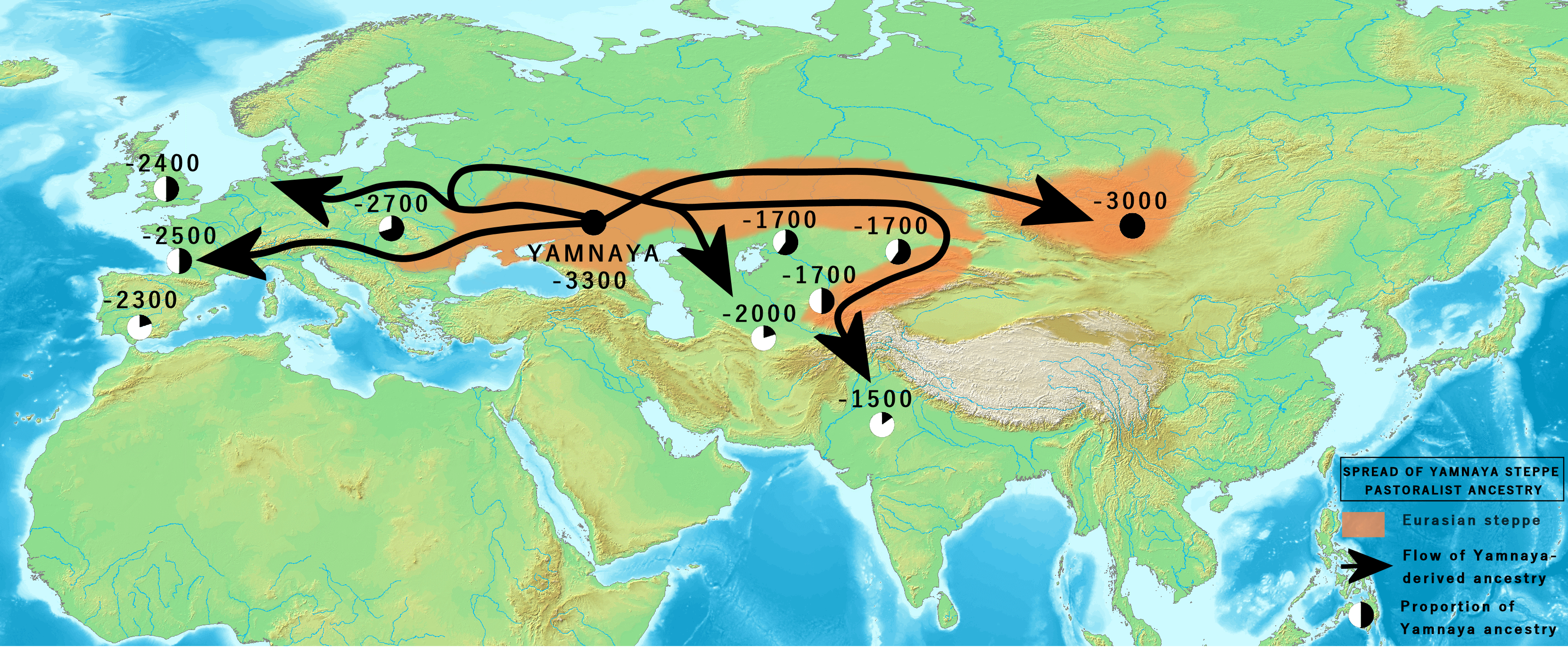
Bronze Age spread of Yamnaya Steppe pastoralist ancestry between 3300 and 1500 BC, including the Afanasievo culture of southern Siberia

The Kurgan hypothesis places the Volga-Dnieper region of southern Russia and Ukraine as the urheimat of the Proto-Indo-Europeans. Early Indo-European migrations from the Pontic–Caspian steppe of Ukraine and Russia spread Yamnaya ancestry and Indo-European languages across large parts of Eurasia. Nomadic pastoralism developed in the Pontic–Caspian steppe beginning in the Chalcolithic. Remnants of these steppe civilisations were discovered in places such as Ipatovo, Sintashta, Arkaim, and Pazyryk, which bear the earliest known traces of horses in warfare. The genetic makeup of speakers of the Uralic language family in northern Europe was shaped by migration from Siberia that began at least 3,500 years ago.

In the 3rd to 4th centuries AD, the Gothic kingdom of Oium existed in southern Russia, which was later overrun by Huns. Between the 3rd and 6th centuries AD, the Bosporan Kingdom, which was a Hellenistic polity that succeeded the Greek colonies, was also overwhelmed by nomadic invasions led by warlike tribes such as the Huns and Eurasian Avars. The Khazars, who were of Turkic origin, ruled the steppes between the Caucasus in the south, to the east past the Volga river basin, and west as far as Kiev on the Dnieper river until the 10th century. After them came the Pechenegs who created a large confederacy, which was subsequently taken over by the Cumans and the Kipchaks.

The ancestors of Russians are among the Slavic tribes that separated from the Proto-Indo-Europeans, who appeared in the northeastern part of Europe c. 1500 years ago. The East Slavs gradually settled western Russia (approximately between modern Moscow and Saint-Petersburg) in two waves: one moving from Kiev towards present-day Suzdal and Murom and another from Polotsk towards Novgorod and Rostov. Prior to Slavic migration, that territory was populated by Finno-Ugrian peoples. From the 7th century onwards, the incoming East Slavs slowly assimilated the native Finno-Ugrians.

=== Kievan Rus' ===
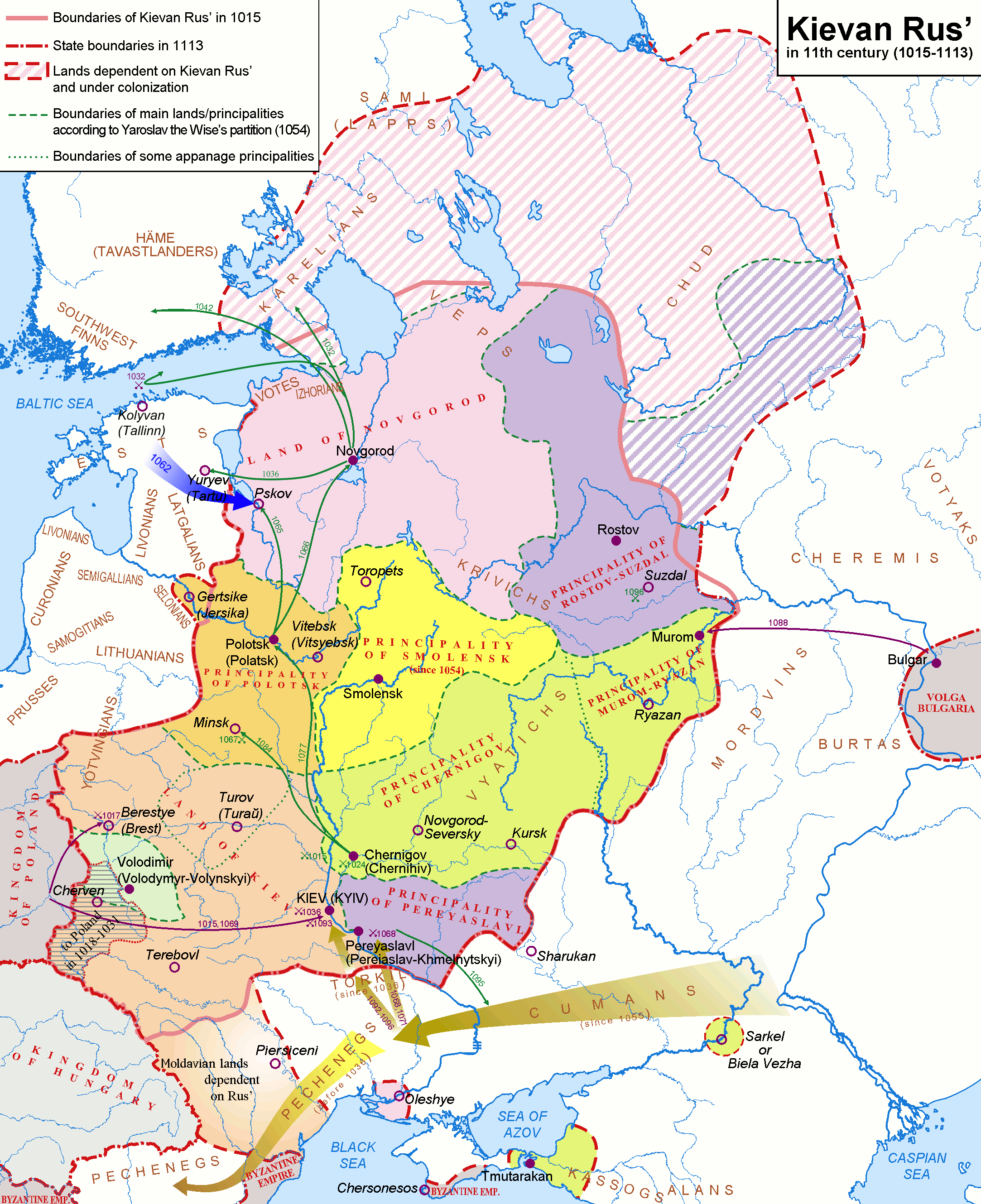
Kievan Rus' after the Council of Liubech in 1097

The establishment of the first East Slavic states in the 9th century coincided with the arrival of the Varangians, Vikings who ventured along the waterways extending from the eastern Baltic to the Black and Caspian Seas. According to the Primary Chronicle, a Varangian from the Rus', named Rurik, was elected ruler of Novgorod in 862. In 882, his successor Oleg ventured south and conquered Kiev, which had been previously paying tribute to the Khazars. Rurik's son Igor and Igor's son Sviatoslav subsequently subdued all local East Slavic tribes to Kievan rule, destroyed the Khazar state, and launched several military expeditions to Bulgaria, Byzantium and Persia.

During the 10th and 11th centuries, Kievan Rus' became one of the largest and most prosperous states in Europe. The reigns of Vladimir the Great (980–1015) and his son Yaroslav the Wise (1019–1054) constitute Kiev's Golden Age. Through his political and religious reforms, Vladimir laid the foundations for the transformation of Kievan Rus' from a fragmented conglomeration of tributary groups into a more unified realm, connected by dynastic authority and shared religious and cultural ties. He adopted Christianity from the Byzantine Empire, beginning the synthesis of Byzantine and Slavic cultures that would define Russian culture for the next millennium. The reign of Yaroslav also saw the creation of the state's first written legal code, the Russkaya Pravda.

Kievan Rus' was politically unstable due to weak centralisation and the absence of a stable succession principle. The rota system introduced by Yaroslav led to princely authority being distributed among members of the ruling Rurikid dynasty according to seniority. Intended to preserve dynastic unity, this system increasingly fostered rivalry among princes, leading to frequent infighting. As a result, political power fragmented among competing regional centres, marking a gradual shift toward decentralisation. Kiev's dominance waned, to the benefit of Vladimir-Suzdal in the north-east, the Novgorod Republic in the north, and Galicia–Volhynia in the south-west. By the 12th century, Kiev lost its pre-eminence and Kievan Rus' had fragmented into different principalities. Prince Andrey Bogolyubsky sacked Kiev in 1169 and made Vladimir his base, leading to political power being shifted to the north-east.

Vladimir-Suzdal continued the tradition of strong princely rule, while the Novgorod Republic, which formally won its independence in 1136, was an exception. From the mid-13th century, the throne of Novgorod was held by the grand princes of Vladimir, although the prince's authority gradually diminished in favour of more republican-style governance, with political power increasingly held by the veche (popular assembly) and elected officials. Novgorod became a major commercial centre through the fur trade and an important centre of Russian culture. Led by Prince Alexander Nevsky, the Novgorodians repelled the invading Swedes in the Battle of the Neva in 1240, as well as the Germanic crusaders in the Battle on the Ice in 1242.

As it was undergoing fragmentation, Kievan Rus' finally fell to the Mongol invasions of 1237–1238, which overran much of the region and later resulted in the sacking of Kiev in 1240 and other cities, as well as the death of a significant portion of the population. The invaders, later known as Tatars, formed the state of the Golden Horde, which ruled over Russia for the next two centuries. Only the Novgorod Republic escaped foreign occupation after it agreed to pay tribute to the Mongols. Galicia–Volhynia would later be absorbed by Lithuania and Poland, while the Novgorod Republic continued to prosper in the north. In the northeast, the Byzantine-Slavic traditions of Kievan Rus' were adapted to form the Russian autocratic state.

=== Grand Principality of Moscow ===
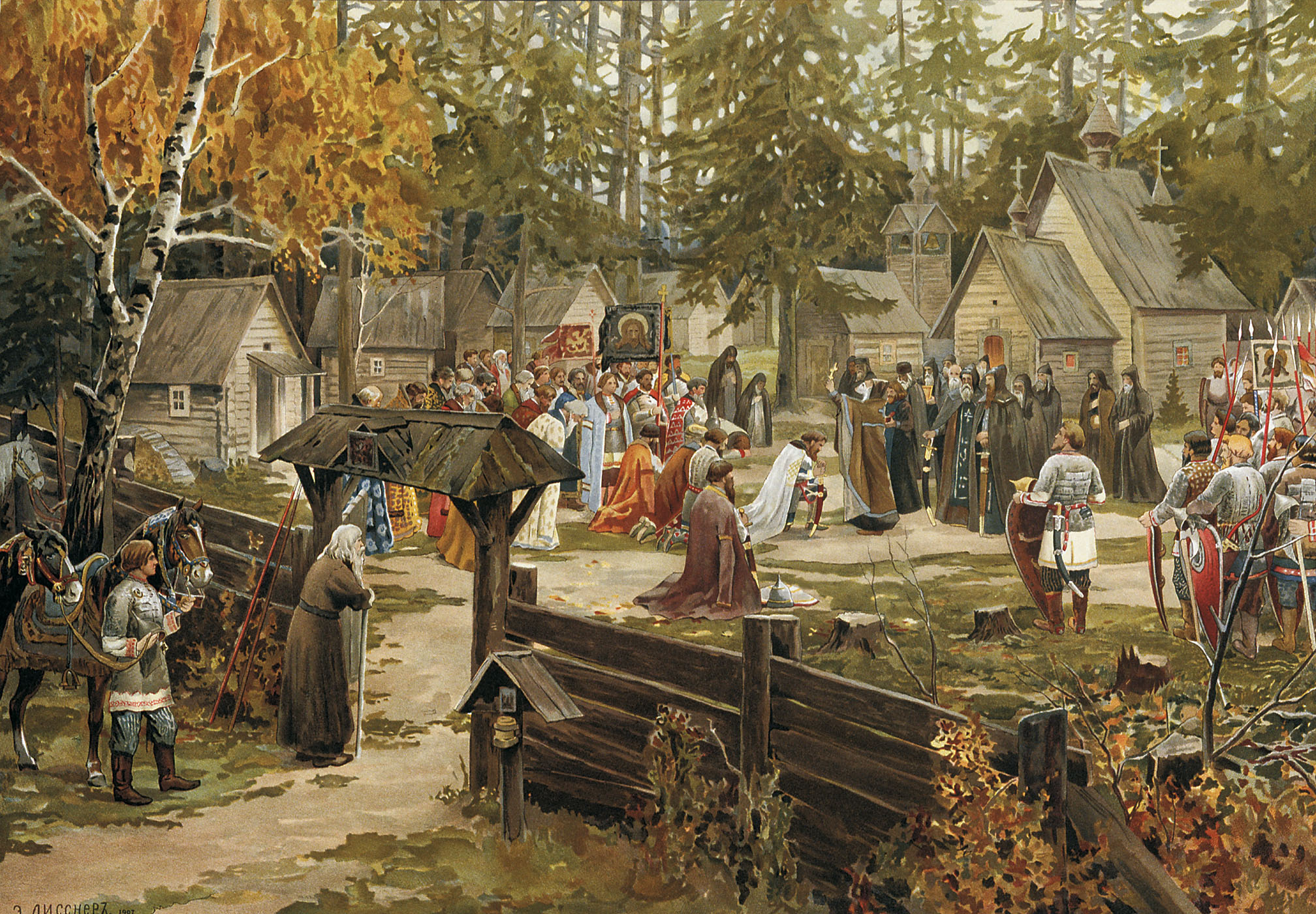
Sergius of Radonezh blessing Dmitry Donskoy in Trinity Sergius Lavra, before the Battle of Kulikovo, depicted in a painting by Ernst Lissner

The destruction of Kievan Rus' saw the eventual rise of the Grand Principality of Moscow, initially a part of Vladimir-Suzdal. While still under the domain of the Mongol-Tatars and with their connivance, Moscow began to assert its influence in the region in the early 14th century, gradually becoming the leading force in the "gathering of the Russian lands". When the seat of the metropolitan of the Russian Orthodox Church moved to Moscow in 1325, its influence increased. Moscow's last rival, the Novgorod Republic, prospered as the chief fur trade centre and the easternmost port of the Hanseatic League.

Led by Prince Dmitry Donskoy of Moscow, the united army of Russian principalities inflicted a milestone defeat on the Mongol-Tatars in the Battle of Kulikovo in 1380. Moscow gradually absorbed its parent duchy and surrounding principalities, including formerly strong rivals such as Tver and Novgorod.

Ivan III ("the Great") threw off the control of the Golden Horde and gained sovereignty over the ethnically Russian lands; he later adopted the title of sovereign of all Russia. After the fall of Constantinople in 1453, Moscow claimed succession to the legacy of the Eastern Roman Empire. Ivan III married Sophia Palaiologina, the niece of the last Byzantine emperor Constantine XI, and made the Byzantine double-headed eagle his own, and eventually Russia's, coat-of-arms. Vasili III united all of Russia by annexing the last few independent Russian states in the early 16th century.

=== Tsardom of Russia ===
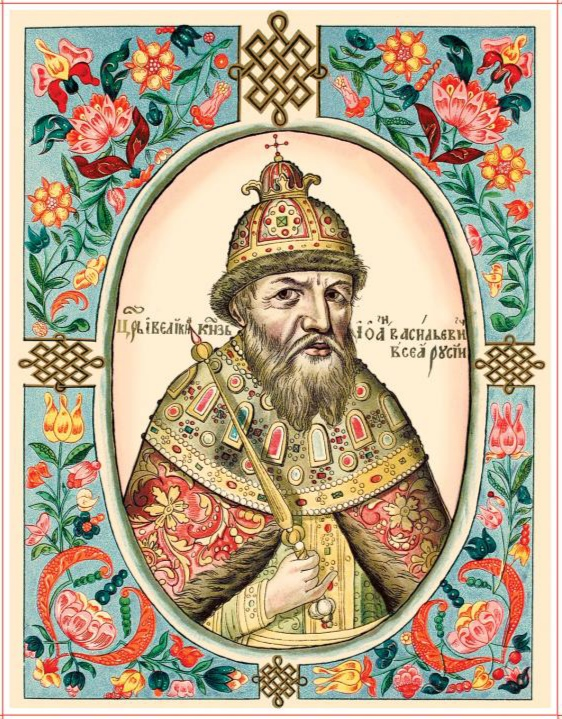
Ivan IV was the Grand Prince of Moscow from 1533 to 1547, then Tsar of Russia until his death in 1584.

In development of the Third Rome ideas, Ivan IV ("the Terrible") was officially crowned as the first tsar of all Russia in 1547. The tsar promulgated a new code of laws (Sudebnik of 1550), established the first Russian feudal representative body (the Zemsky Sobor), revamped the military, curbed the influence of the clergy, and reorganised local government. During his long reign, Ivan nearly doubled the already large Russian territory by annexing the three Tatar khanates: Kazan and Astrakhan along the Volga, and the Khanate of Sibir in southwestern Siberia. Ultimately, by the end of the 16th century, Russia expanded east of the Ural Mountains. However, the Tsardom was weakened by the long and unsuccessful Livonian War against the coalition of the Kingdom of Poland and the Grand Duchy of Lithuania (later the united Polish–Lithuanian Commonwealth), the Kingdom of Sweden, and Denmark–Norway for access to the Baltic coast and sea trade. In 1571, the Crimean Tatars, supported by the Ottomans, burned down Moscow, destroying everything except the Kremlin. The following year, the Crimeans attempted another raid on Moscow, but this time they were defeated in the crucial Battle of Molodi.

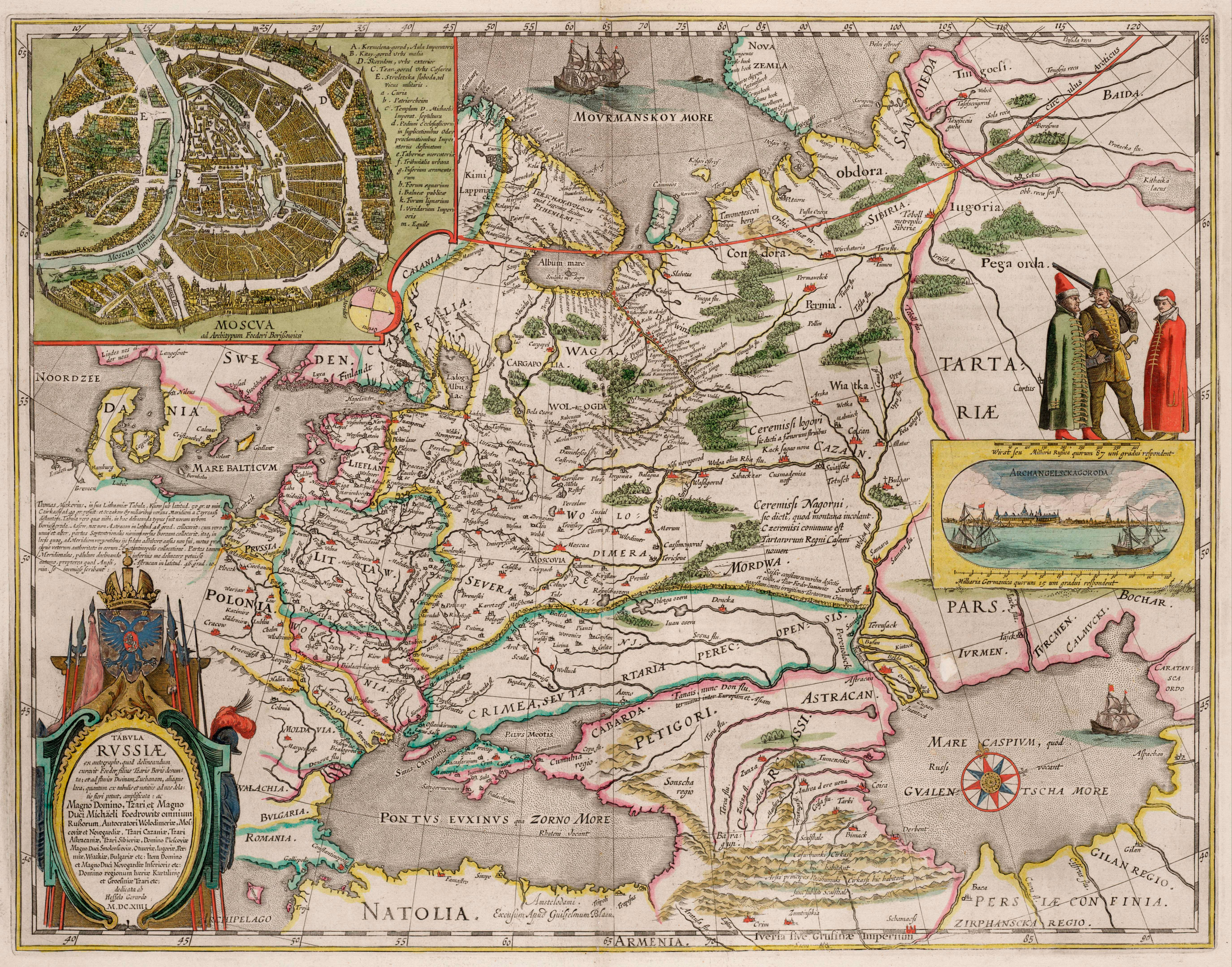
Feodor Godunov's map of Russia, as published by Hessel Gerritsz in 1614

The death of Ivan's sons marked the end of the ancient Rurik dynasty in 1598, and in combination with the famine of 1601–1603, led to a civil war, the rule of pretenders, and foreign intervention during the Time of Troubles in the early 17th century. The Polish–Lithuanian Commonwealth, taking advantage, occupied parts of Russia, extending into the capital Moscow. In 1612, the Poles were forced to retreat by the Russian volunteer corps, led by merchant Kuzma Minin and prince Dmitry Pozharsky. The Romanov dynasty acceded to the throne in 1613 by the decision of the Zemsky Sobor, and the country started its gradual recovery from the crisis.

Russia continued its territorial growth through the 17th century, which was the age of the Cossacks. In 1654, the Ukrainian leader, Bohdan Khmelnytsky, offered to place Ukraine under the protection of the Russian tsar, Alexis, whose acceptance of this offer led to another Russo-Polish War. Ultimately, Ukraine was split along the Dnieper, placing left-bank Ukraine and Kiev under Russian rule. In the east, the rapid Russian exploration and colonisation of vast Siberia continued, hunting for valuable furs and ivory. Russian explorers pushed eastward primarily along the Siberian River Routes, and by the mid-17th century, there were Russian settlements in eastern Siberia, on the Chukchi Peninsula, along the Amur River, and on the coast of the Pacific Ocean. In 1648, Semyon Dezhnyov became the first European to navigate through the Bering Strait.

=== Imperial Russia ===
==== Proclamation as empire, cultural and societal enlightenment, and Imperial colonization ====
Under Peter I ("the Great"), Russia was proclaimed an empire in 1721, and established itself as one of the European great powers. Ruling from 1682 to 1725, Peter defeated Sweden in the Great Northern War (1700–1721), securing Russia's access to the sea and sea trade. In 1703, on the Baltic Sea, Peter founded Saint Petersburg as Russia's new capital. Throughout his rule, sweeping reforms were made, which brought significant Western European cultural influences to Russia. He was succeeded by Catherine I (1725–1727), followed by Peter II (1727–1730), and Anna. The reign of Peter I's daughter Elizabeth in 1741–1762 saw Russia's participation in the Seven Years' War (1756–1763). During the conflict, Russian troops overran East Prussia, occupying Berlin for three days. However, upon Elizabeth's death, all these conquests were returned to the Kingdom of Prussia by pro-Prussian Peter III before his overthrowing.

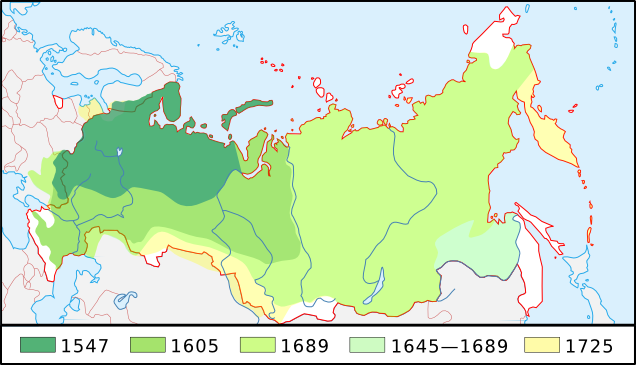
Expansion and territorial evolution of Russia between 1547 and 1725

Catherine II ("the Great"), who ruled from 1762–1796, presided over the Russian Age of Enlightenment. Russia participated in the first partition of the Polish–Lithuanian Commonwealth in 1772 by annexing most of its territories, making it the most populous European state. Following the Russo-Turkish War of 1768–1774, Russian territory reached the coastline of the Black Sea, through its annexation of the Crimean Khanate in 1783. By early 19th century, Russia conquered the Caucasus following the final Russo-Persian War of 1826–1828.

Catherine was succeeded by her son Paul in 1796, and his short and unstable reign ended in 1801 following his assassination. Alexander I's conservative rule (1801–1825) saw Russia incorporate Finland in 1809, emerging victorious in the Finnish War against the weakened Kingdom of Sweden and annexing Bessarabia following the successful Russo-Turkish War of 1806–1812.

From the mid-18th century, Russia participated in the colonization of North America, where it established the Russian-American Company and became the first European state to settle Alaska in 1784, at Three Saints Bay on Kodiak Island. In 1803–1806, the first Russian circumnavigation around the Earth was made. By 1812, Russia settled the Pacific coast of North America, at Fort Ross in California. In 1820, an expedition led by Russian explorers Fabian Gottlieb von Bellingshausen and Mikhail Lazarev discovered the continent of Antarctica.

==== Napoleonic Wars, Congress of Vienna, and zenith of Imperial power ====
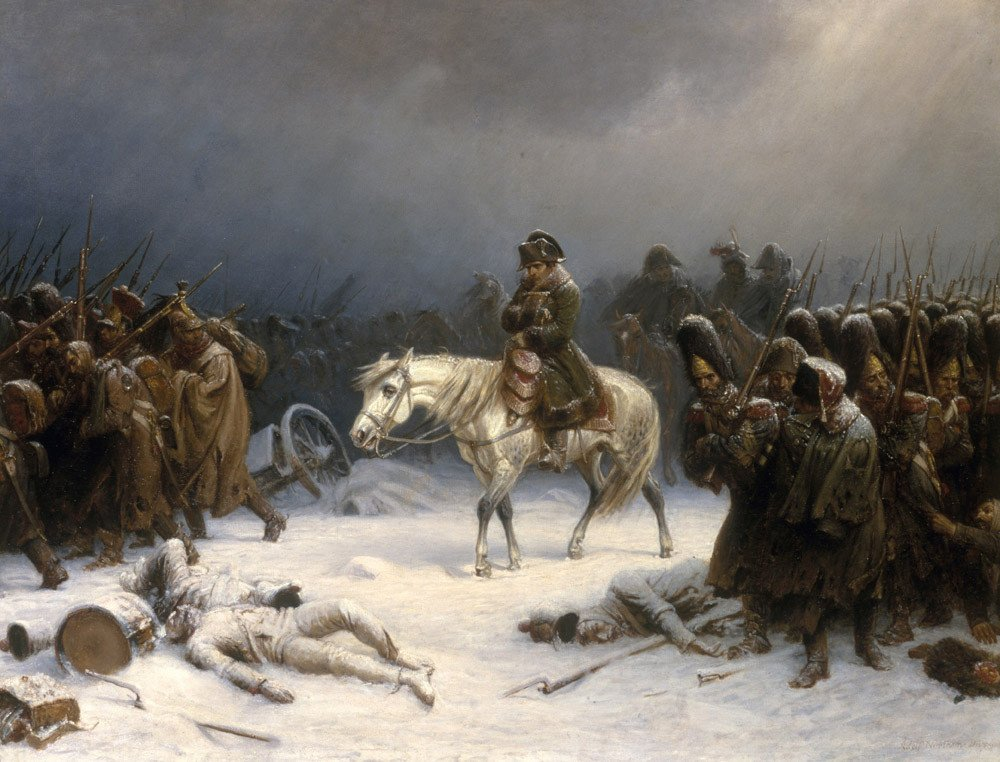
Napoleon's withdrawal from Russia, painting by Adolph Northen

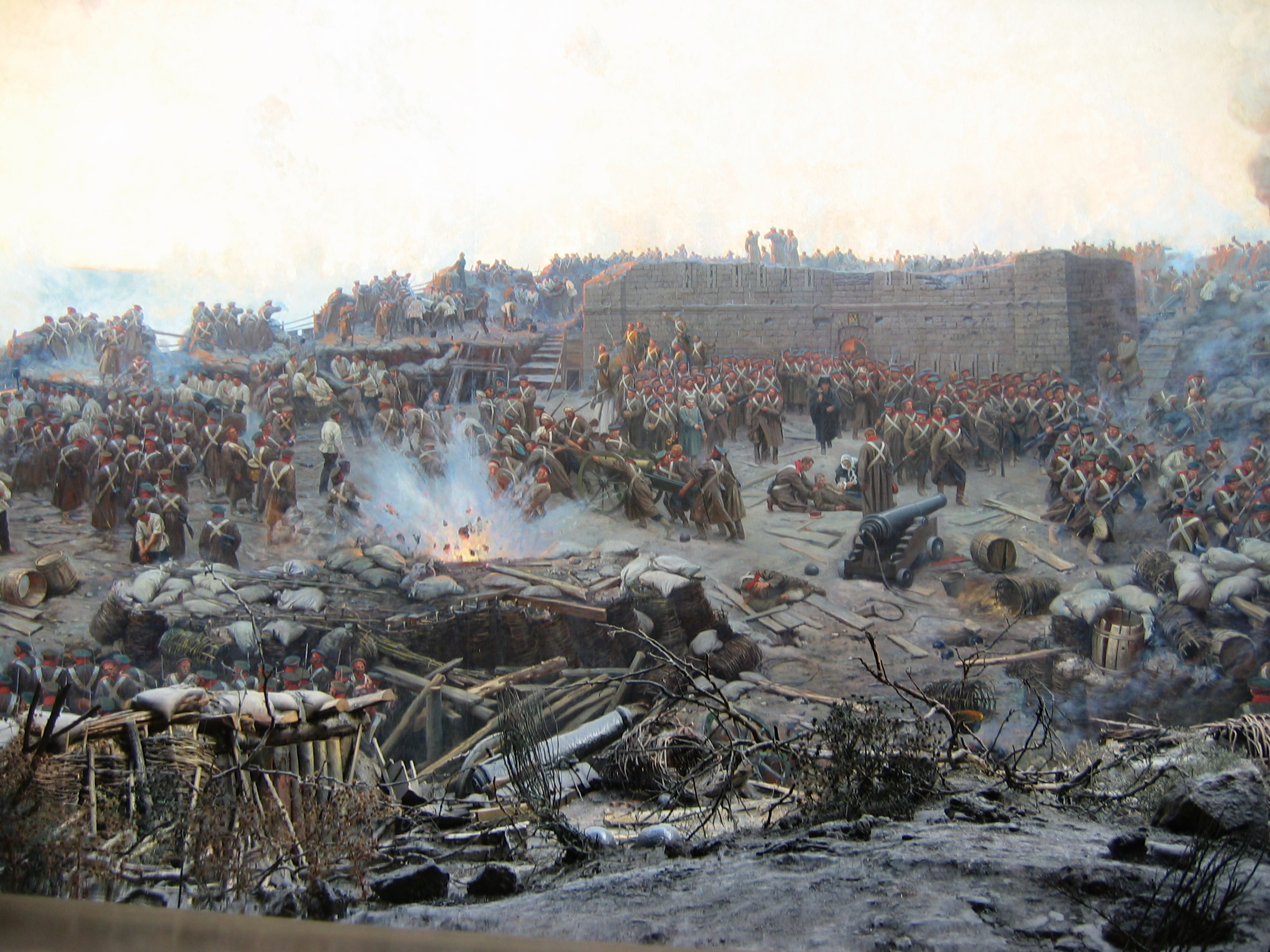
The crucial Siege of Sevastopol (1854–1855) during the Crimean War

During the Napoleonic Wars, Russia and France concluded peace through the Treaties of Tilsit in 1807. However, Franco-Russian relations deteriorated soon thereafter—amid disputes over the Continental System, the status of the Duchy of Warsaw, and Napoleon's efforts to politically subordinate Russia—ultimately culminating in the French invasion of Russia in 1812.

The invasion initially succeeded, with the pan-European Grande Armée advancing fast and briefly occupying Moscow. Russian commanders, notably Michael Andreas Barclay de Tolly and Mikhail Kutuzov, avoided a climactic battle and adopted a strategy of attrition warfare and strategic retreats. Despite the costly and inconclusive Battle of Borodino, Alexander I refused to negotiate after Moscow was abandoned and destroyed by an ongoing fire. As the Russian winter set in—logistical collapse, lack of supplies, disease, and mounting losses—forced the invaders into a disastrous retreat, resulting in their near-total destruction.

Russian forces, alongside a coalition of European states, pursued the retreating French armies westward during the War of the Sixth Coalition, contributing decisively to Napoleon's defeat and the capture of Paris in 1814. Following Napoleon's abdication, Russia participated in the quadripartite occupation of France following the Treaty of Paris in 1815. Alexander I led the Russian delegation at the Congress of Vienna (1814–1815), which redefined the European balance of power and established Congress Poland as an autonomous polity within Russia.

In the postwar period, Russia joined the United Kingdom and Austria in the Quadruple Alliance and helped establish the Holy Alliance with Austria and Prussia, a coalition between the absolute monarchist great powers of Europe. At the same time, exposure to Western European liberalism during the French campaigns influenced a generation of Russian officers, contributing to the failed Decembrist revolt of 1825 in an attempt to curtail the Tsarist autocracy.

Under Nicholas I (1825–1855), Russian domestic and foreign policy became rigidly conservative and reactionary, aimed at preserving monarchical order within Russia and across Europe. Guided by the doctrine of Orthodoxy, Autocracy, and Nationality, Nicholas cast Russia as the "gendarme of Europe," suppressing revolutionary and nationalist movements on the continent. Russia intervened militarily to crush the November Uprising in Congress Poland (1830–1831), eliminating Polish autonomy; and also aided Austria in quelling the Hungarian Revolution of 1848.

Simultaneously, Russia pursued an assertive role in the Eastern question amid the weakening Ottoman Empire, consolidating its position as protector of Orthodox Christians in the Balkans through coercive diplomacy and the successful Russo-Turkish War of 1828–1829. Russian dominance in Europe ultimately unraveled following its catastrophic defeat in the Crimean War (1853–1856) against the Ottoman and pan-European coalition, which exposed deep structural and military weaknesses within its autocratic system.

==== Liberal reforms, modernization of the army, and the Great Game ====
Nicholas's successor Alexander II (1855–1881) enacted significant changes throughout the country, including the emancipation reform of 1861, and the selling of Alaska to the United States in 1867. The reforms enacted by Alexander II spurred industrialisation and modernised the Imperial Russian Army—which went on to liberate much of the Balkans from Ottoman rule in the aftermath of the Russo-Turkish War of 1877–1878.

Russian serfs listening to the proclamation of the Emancipation Manifesto in 1861, painted by Boris Kustodiev c. 1907

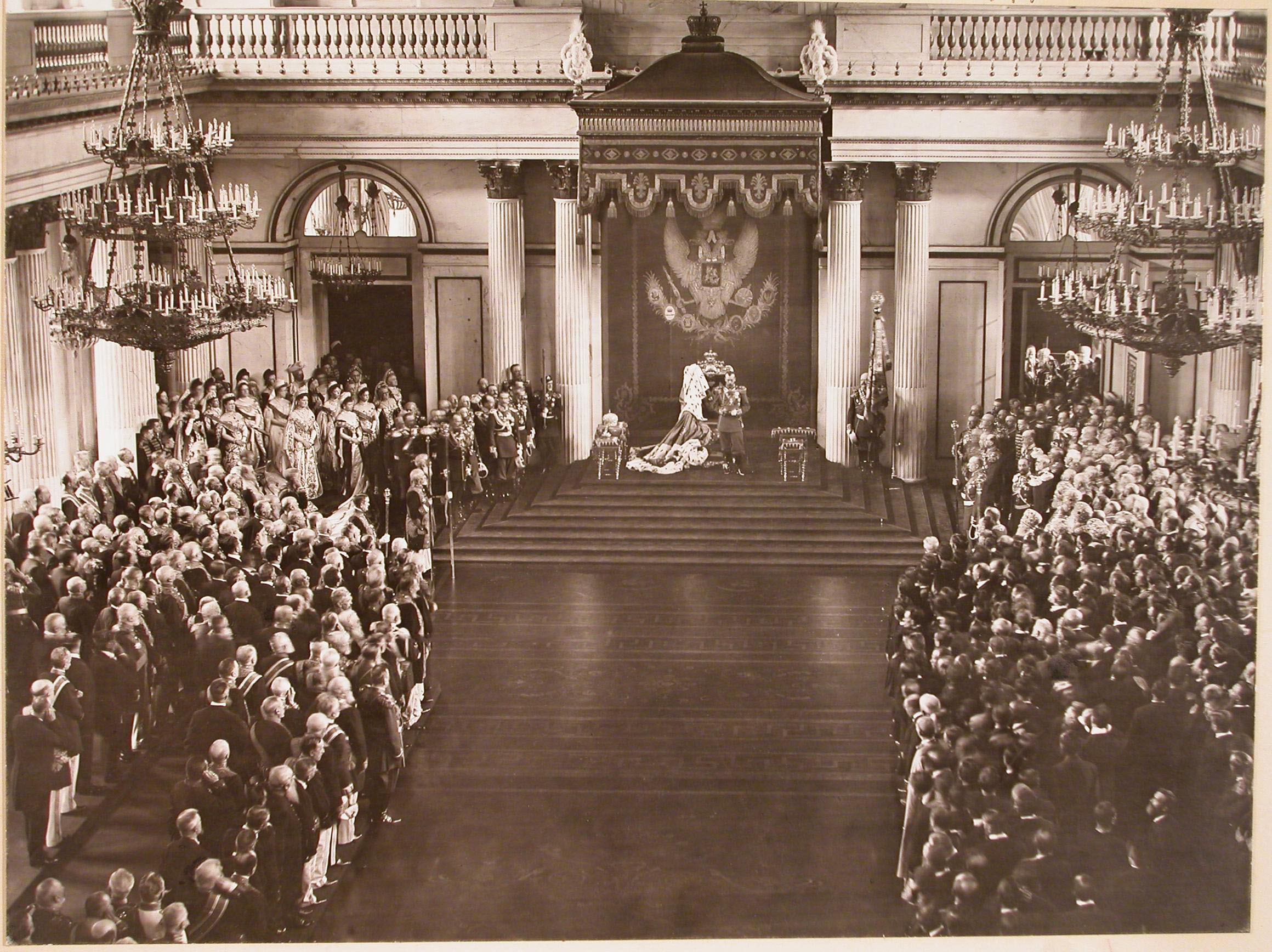
Emperor Nicholas II inaugurates the first State Duma and the entire Russian parliament at the Winter Palace in Saint Petersburg, 10 May 1906

During most of the 19th and early 20th century—Russia and Britain colluded over control of Afghanistan and its neighboring territories in Central and South Asia—a period of rivalry now termed the "Great Game". The late 19th century saw the rise of various socialist movements in Russia. Alexander II was assassinated in 1881 by revolutionary terrorists. The reign of his son Alexander III (1881–1894) was less liberal but more peaceful.

==== Russo-Japanese War and constitutional monarchy ====
Under last Russian emperor, Nicholas II (1894–1917), the Revolution of 1905 was triggered by the humiliating failure of the Russo-Japanese War. The uprising was put down, but the government was forced to concede major reforms (Russian Constitution of 1906), including granting freedoms of speech and assembly, the legalisation of political parties, and the creation of an elected legislative body, the State Duma.

=== World War I, revolution and civil war ===
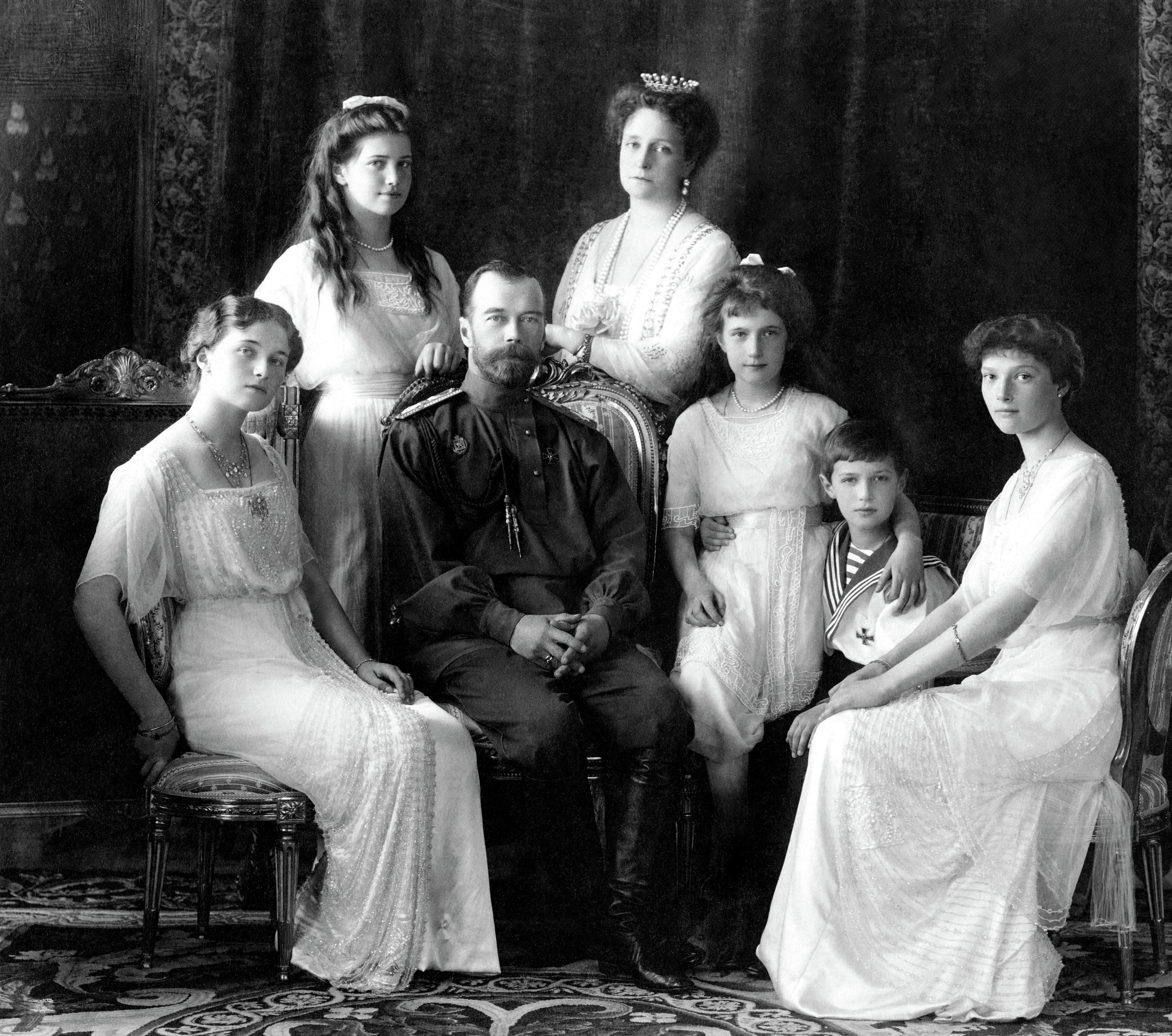
Emperor Nicholas II of Russia and the ruling Romanov family were executed by the Bolsheviks in 1918

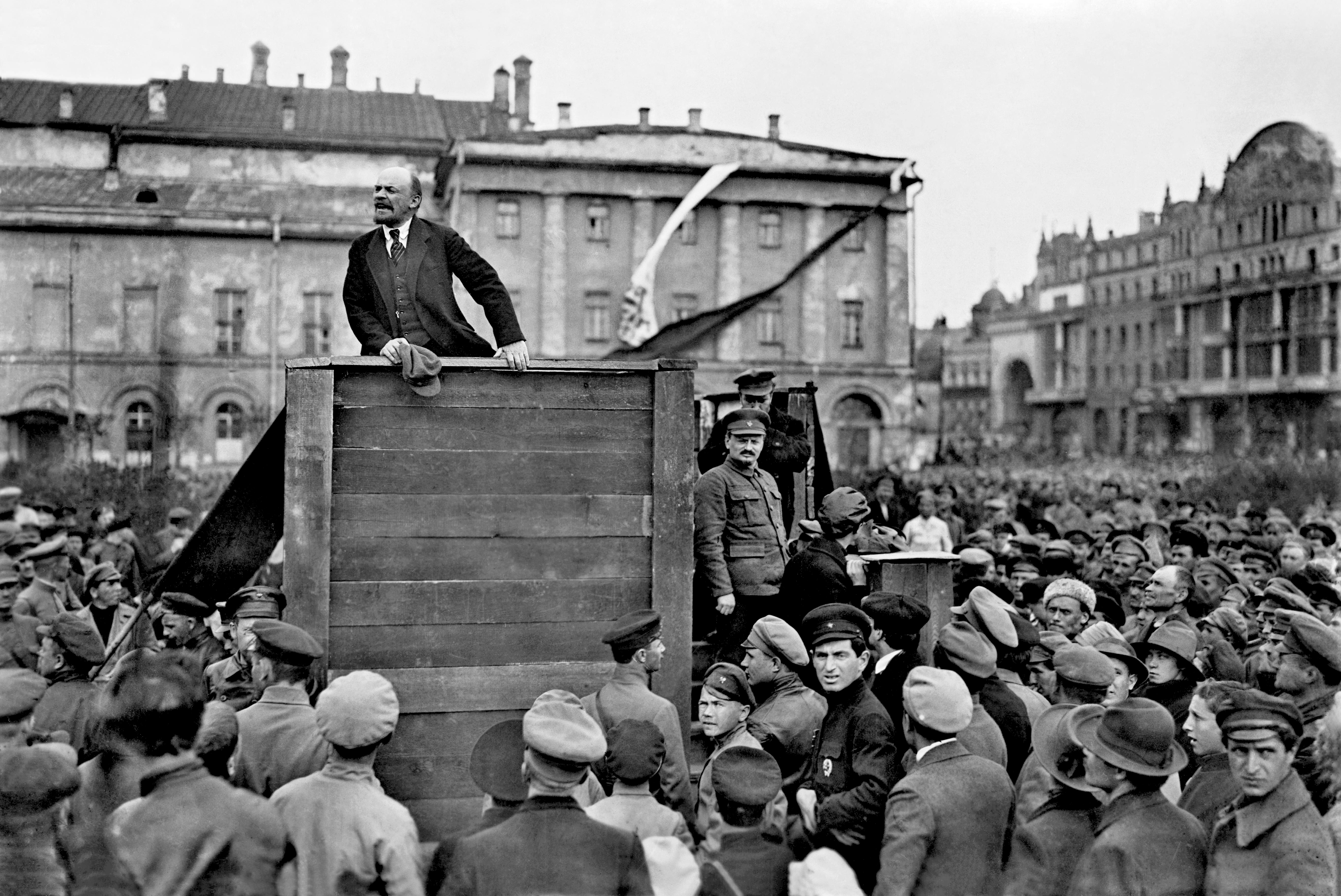
Vladimir Lenin speaks in Moscow, with Leon Trotsky leaning against the podium, 1920

In 1914, Russia entered World War I in response to Austria-Hungary's declaration of war on Russia's ally Serbia, and fought across multiple fronts while isolated from its Triple Entente allies. In 1916, the Brusilov Offensive of the Imperial Russian Army almost completely destroyed the Austro-Hungarian Army. However, the already-existing public distrust of the regime was deepened by the rising costs of war, high casualties, and rumours of corruption and treason.

All this formed the climate for the Russian Revolution of 1917, carried out in two major acts. In early 1917, Nicholas II was forced to abdicate; he and his family were imprisoned and later executed during the Russian Civil War. The monarchy was replaced by a shaky coalition of political parties that declared itself the Provisional Government, and proclaimed the Russian Republic. On 19 January 1918, the Russian Constituent Assembly declared Russia a democratic federal republic (thus ratifying the Provisional Government's decision). The next day the Constituent Assembly was dissolved by the All-Russian Central Executive Committee.

An alternative socialist establishment co-existed, the Petrograd Soviet, wielding power through the democratically elected councils of workers and peasants (soviets). The rule of the new authorities only aggravated the crisis in the country instead of resolving it, and eventually, the October Revolution, led by Bolshevik leader Vladimir Lenin, overthrew the Provisional Government and gave full governing power to the soviets, leading to the creation of the world's first socialist state.

The Russian Civil War broke out between the anti-communist White movement and the Bolsheviks with its Red Army. In the aftermath of signing the Treaty of Brest-Litovsk that concluded hostilities with the Central Powers of World War I, Bolshevist Russia surrendered most of its western territories, which hosted 34% of its population, 54% of its industries, 32% of its agricultural land, and roughly 90% of its coal mines.

The Allied powers launched an unsuccessful military intervention in support of anti-communist forces. In the meantime, both the Bolsheviks and White movement carried out campaigns of deportations and executions against each other, known respectively as the Red Terror and White Terror. By the end of the violent civil war, Russia's economy and infrastructure were heavily damaged, and as many as 10 million perished during the war, mostly civilians. Millions became White émigrés, and the Russian famine of 1921–1922 claimed up to five million victims.

=== Soviet Union ===
Location of the Russian SFSR (red) within the Soviet Union in 1936

==== Command economy and Soviet society ====
On 30 December 1922, Lenin and his aides formed the Soviet Union, by joining the Russian SFSR into a single state with the Byelorussian, Transcaucasian, and Ukrainian republics. Eventually, internal border changes and annexations during World War II resulted in a union of 15 republics, the largest and most populous being the Russian SFSR, which dominated the union politically, culturally, and economically.

Following Lenin's death in 1924, a troika was designated to take charge. Eventually Joseph Stalin, the General Secretary of the Communist Party, managed to suppress all opposition factions and consolidate power in his hands to become the country's dictator by the 1930s. Leon Trotsky, the main proponent of world revolution, was exiled from the Soviet Union in 1929, and Stalin's idea of Socialism in One Country became the official line. The continued internal struggle in the Bolshevik party culminated in the Great Purge.

==== Stalinism and modernisation ====
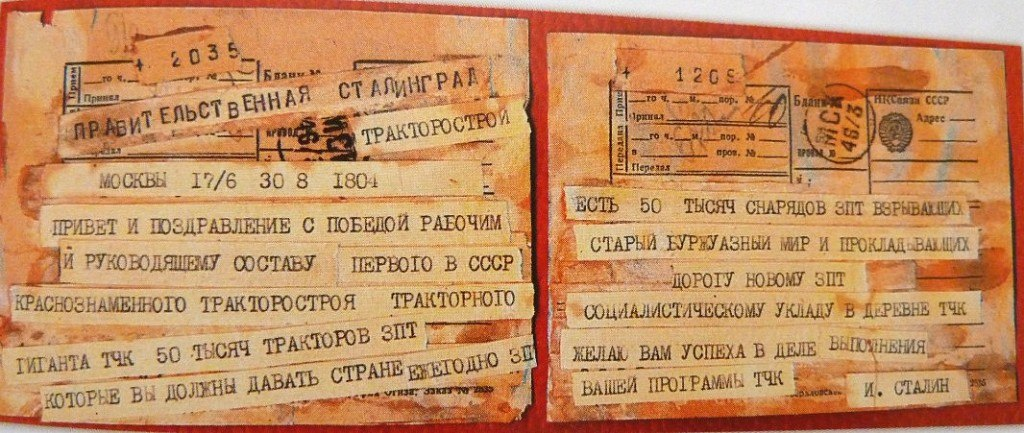
Congratulations sent by Joseph Stalin on the opening of the Stalingrad Tractor Plant

Under Stalin's leadership, the government launched a command economy, industrialisation of the largely rural country, and collectivisation of its agriculture. During this period of rapid economic and social change, millions of people were sent to penal labour camps, including many political convicts for their suspected or real opposition to Stalin's rule, and millions were deported and exiled to remote areas of the Soviet Union. The transitional disorganisation of the country's agriculture, combined with the harsh state policies and a drought, led to the Soviet famine of 1932–1933, which killed 5.7 to 8.7 million, 3.3 million of them in the Russian SFSR. The Soviet Union underwent a rapid and costly transformation from a predominantly agrarian economy into a major industrial power.

==== World War II and United Nations ====
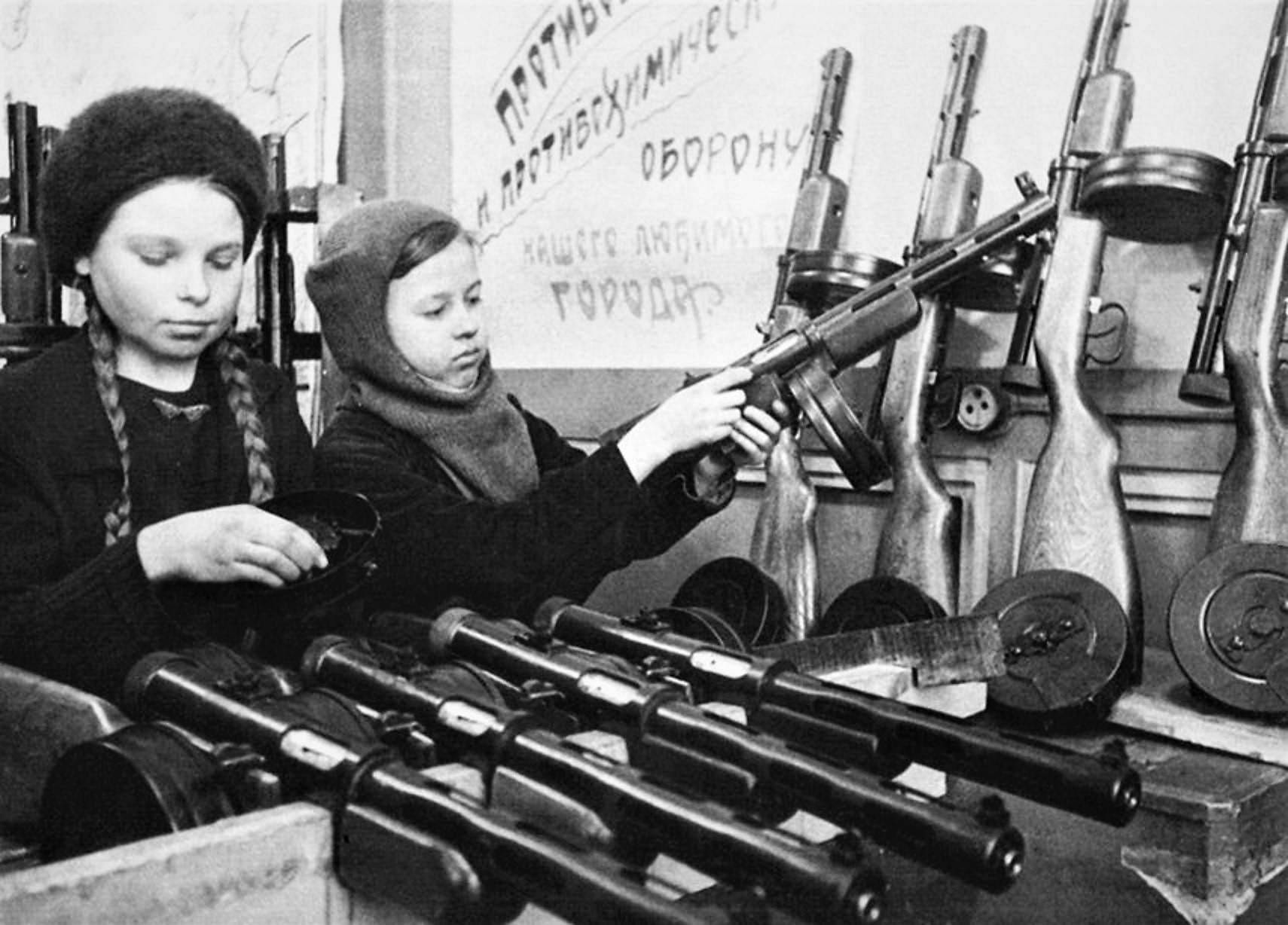
Two teenage girls assemble PPD-40 submachine guns during the Siege of Leningrad in 1942.

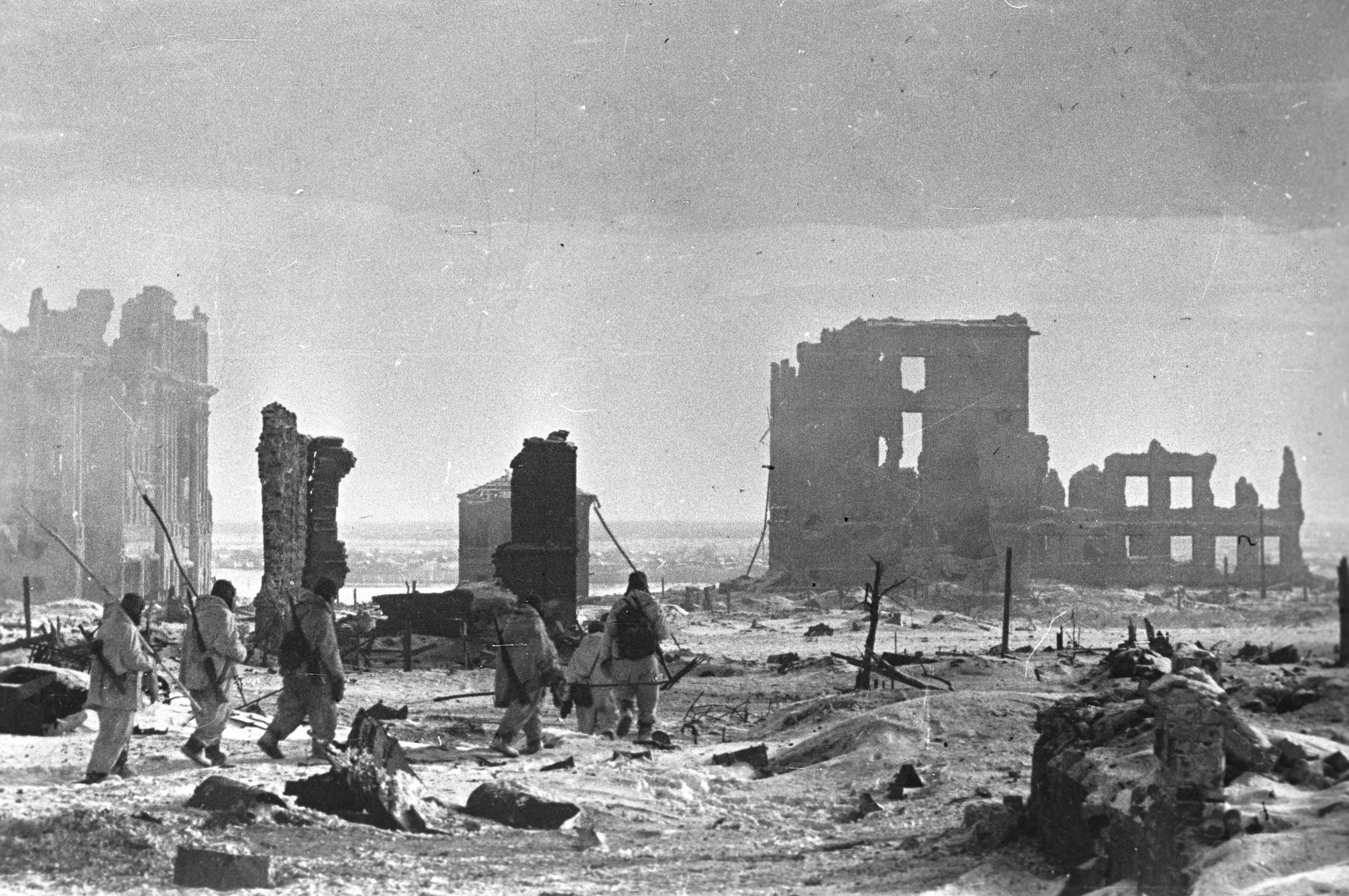
The Battle of Stalingrad, the largest and bloodiest battle in the history of warfare, ended in 1943 with a decisive Soviet victory against the German army.

The Soviet Union entered World War II on 17 September 1939 with its invasion of Poland, in accordance with a secret protocol within the Molotov–Ribbentrop Pact with Nazi Germany. The Soviet Union later invaded Finland, and occupied and annexed the Baltic states, as well as parts of Romania. On 22 June 1941, Germany invaded the Soviet Union, opening the Eastern Front, the largest theatre of World War II.

Eventually, some 5 million Red Army troops were captured by the Nazis; the latter deliberately starved to death or otherwise killed 3.3 million Soviet POWs, and a vast number of civilians, as the "Hunger Plan" sought to fulfil Generalplan Ost. Although the Wehrmacht had considerable early success, their attack was halted in the Battle of Moscow. Subsequently, the Germans were dealt major defeats first at the Battle of Stalingrad in the winter of 1942–1943, and then in the Battle of Kursk in the summer of 1943. Another German failure was the Siege of Leningrad, in which the city was fully blockaded on land between 1941 and 1944 by German and Finnish forces, and suffered starvation and more than a million deaths, but never surrendered. Soviet forces steamrolled through Eastern and Central Europe in 1944–1945 and captured Berlin in May 1945. In August 1945, the Red Army invaded Manchuria and ousted the Japanese from Northeast Asia, contributing to the Allied victory over Japan.

The 1941–1945 period of World War II is known in Russia as the Great Patriotic War. The Soviet Union, along with the United States, the United Kingdom and China were considered the Big Four of Allied powers in World War II, and later became the Four Policemen, which was the foundation of the United Nations Security Council. During the war, Soviet civilian and military death were about 26–27 million, accounting for about half of all World War II casualties. The Soviet economy and infrastructure suffered massive devastation, which caused the Soviet famine of 1946–1947. However, at the expense of a large sacrifice, the Soviet Union emerged as a superpower.

==== Superpower and Cold War ====
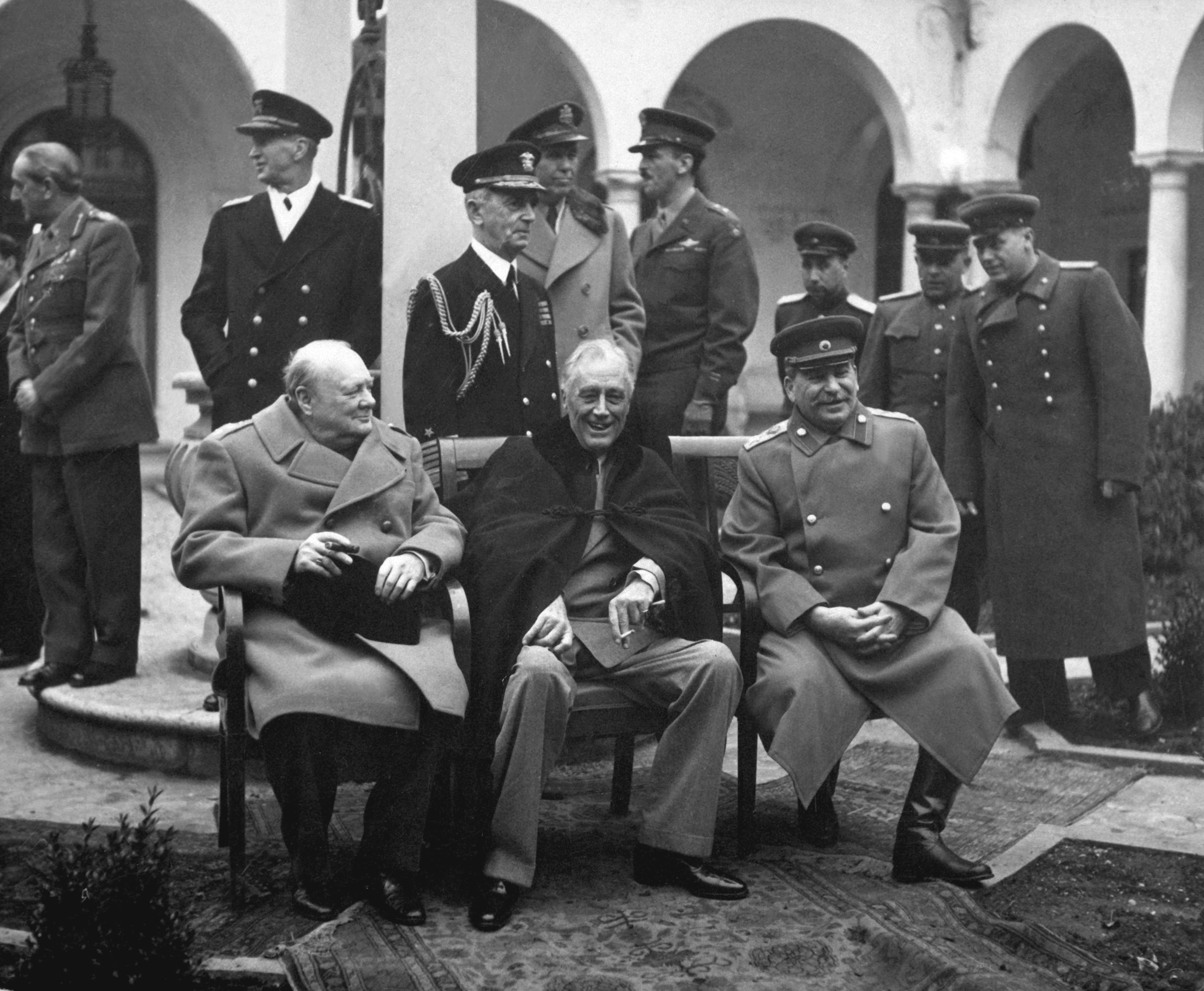
The "Big Three" at the Yalta Conference in February 1945, Winston Churchill, Franklin D. Roosevelt and Joseph Stalin

After World War II, according to the Potsdam Conference, the Red Army occupied parts of Eastern and Central Europe, including East Germany and the eastern regions of Austria. Dependent communist governments were installed in the Eastern Bloc satellite states. After becoming the world's second nuclear power, the Soviet Union established the Warsaw Pact alliance, and entered into a struggle for global dominance, known as the Cold War, with the rivalling United States and NATO.

==== Khrushchev Thaw reforms and economic development ====
After Stalin's death in 1953 and a short period of collective leadership, the new leader Nikita Khrushchev denounced Stalin and launched the policy of de-Stalinization, releasing many political prisoners from the Gulag labour camps. The general easement of repressive policies became known later as the Khrushchev Thaw. At the same time, Cold War tensions reached its peak when the two rivals clashed over the deployment of the United States Jupiter missiles in Turkey and Soviet missiles in Cuba.

In 1957, the Soviet Union launched the world's first artificial satellite, Sputnik 1, thus starting the Space Age. Russian cosmonaut Yuri Gagarin became the first human to orbit the Earth, aboard the Vostok 1 crewed spacecraft on 12 April 1961.

==== Period of developed socialism or Era of Stagnation ====
Following the ousting of Khrushchev in 1964, another period of collective leadership ensued, until Leonid Brezhnev became the leader. The era of the 1970s and the early 1980s was later designated as the Era of Stagnation. The 1965 Kosygin reform aimed for partial decentralisation of the Soviet economy. In 1979, after a communist-led revolution in Afghanistan, Soviet forces invaded the country, ultimately starting the Soviet–Afghan War. In May 1988, the Soviets started to withdraw from Afghanistan, due to international opposition, persistent anti-Soviet guerrilla warfare, and a lack of support by Soviet citizens.

==== Perestroika, democratisation and Russian sovereignty ====
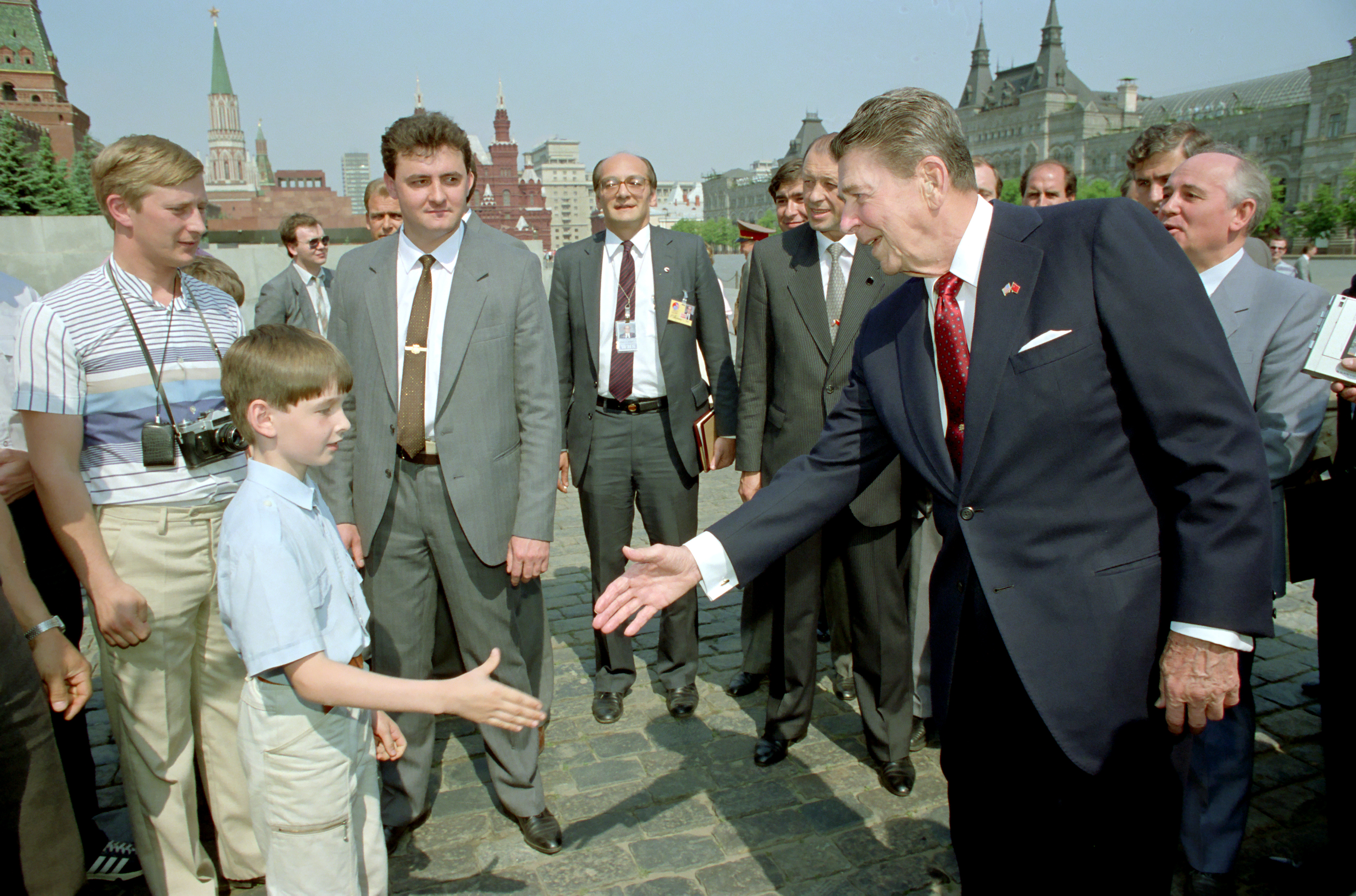
Soviet leader Mikhail Gorbachev and US President Ronald Reagan in Red Square during the Moscow Summit, 31 May 1988

From 1985 onwards, the last Soviet leader Mikhail Gorbachev, who sought to enact liberal reforms in the Soviet system, introduced the policies of glasnost (openness) and perestroika (restructuring) in an attempt to end the period of economic stagnation and to democratise the government. This, however, led to the rise of strong nationalist and separatist movements across the country. Prior to 1991, the Soviet economy was the world's second-largest, but during its final years, it went into a crisis.

By 1991, economic and political turmoil began to boil over as the Baltic states chose to secede from the Soviet Union. On 17 March, a referendum was held, in which the vast majority of participating citizens voted in favour of changing the Soviet Union into a renewed federation. In June 1991, Boris Yeltsin became the first directly elected President in Russian history when he was elected President of the Russian SFSR. In August 1991, a coup d'état attempt by members of Gorbachev's government, directed against Gorbachev and aimed at preserving the Soviet Union, instead led to the end of the Communist Party of the Soviet Union. On 25 December 1991, following the dissolution of the Soviet Union, along with contemporary Russia, fourteen other post-Soviet states emerged.

=== Independent Russian Federation ===
==== Transition to a market economy and political crises ====
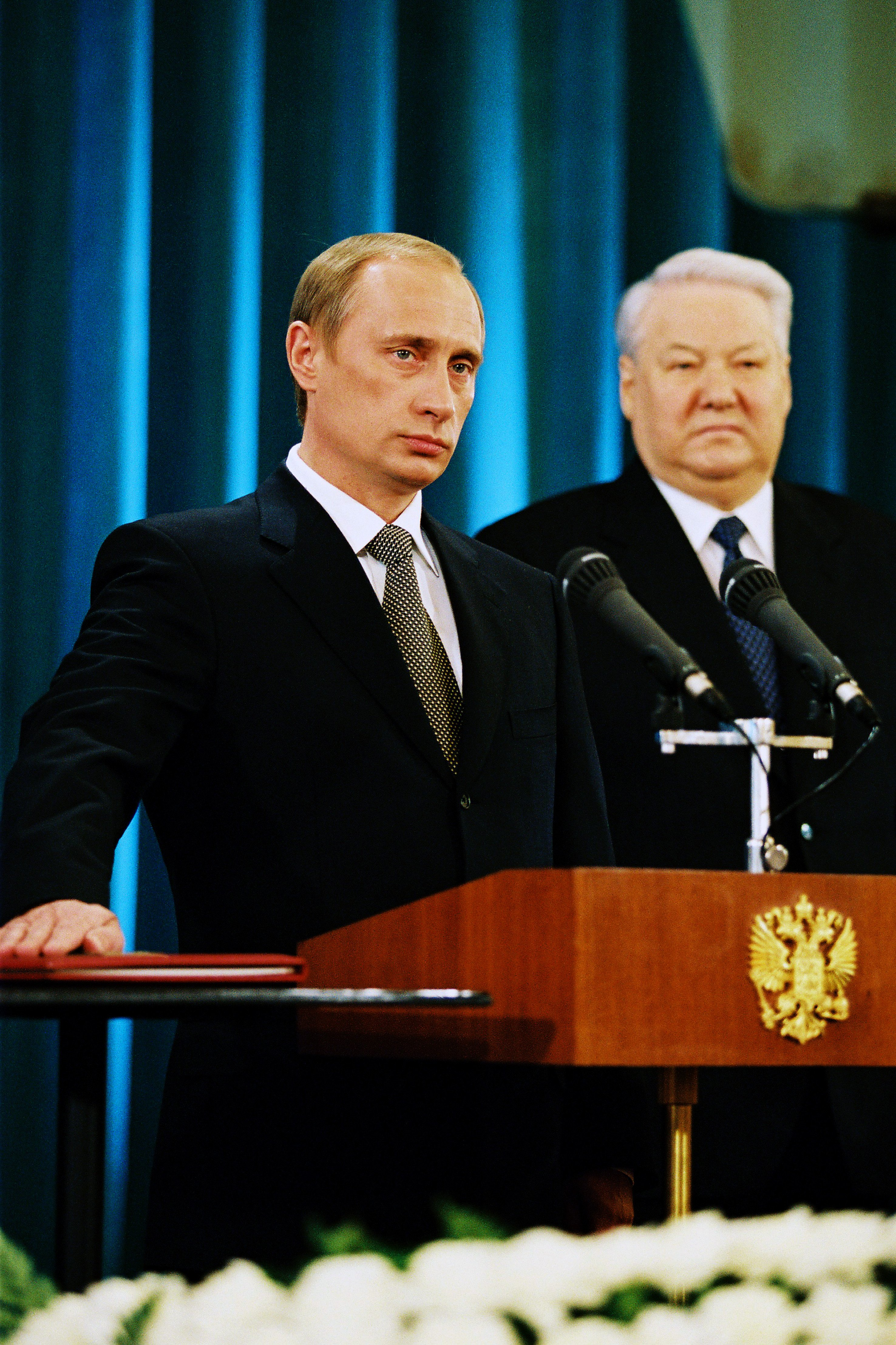
Vladimir Putin takes the oath of office as president on his first inauguration, with Boris Yeltsin looking over, 2000

The economic and political collapse of the Soviet Union led Russia into a deep and prolonged depression. During and after the disintegration of the Soviet Union, wide-ranging reforms including privatisation and market and trade liberalisation were undertaken, including radical changes along the lines of "shock therapy". The privatisation largely shifted control of enterprises from state agencies to individuals with inside connections in the government, which led to the rise of Russian oligarchs. Many of the newly rich moved billions in cash and assets outside of the country in an enormous capital flight. The depression of the economy led to the collapse of social services—the birth rate plummeted while the death rate skyrocketed, and millions plunged into poverty, while extreme corruption, as well as criminal gangs and organised crime rose significantly.

In late 1993, tensions between Yeltsin and the Russian parliament culminated in a constitutional crisis which ended violently through military force. During the crisis, Yeltsin was backed by Western governments, and over 100 people were killed.

==== Modern liberal constitution, international cooperation and economic stabilisation ====
In December, a referendum was held and approved, which introduced a new constitution, giving the president enormous powers. The 1990s were plagued by armed conflicts in the North Caucasus, both local ethnic skirmishes and separatist Islamist insurrections. From the time Chechen separatists declared independence in the early 1990s, an intermittent guerrilla war was fought between the rebel groups and Russian forces. Terrorist attacks against civilians were carried out by Chechen separatists, claiming the lives of thousands of Russian civilians. (Note: Most notably the Budyonnovsk hospital hostage crisis, the Russian apartment bombings, the Moscow theatre hostage crisis, and the Beslan school siege)

After the dissolution of the Soviet Union, Russia assumed responsibility for settling the latter's external debts. In 1992, most consumer price controls were eliminated, causing extreme inflation and significantly devaluing the rouble. High budget deficits coupled with increasing capital flight and inability to pay back debts, caused the 1998 Russian financial crisis, which resulted in a further GDP decline.

==== Movement towards a modernised economy, political centralisation and democratic backsliding ====
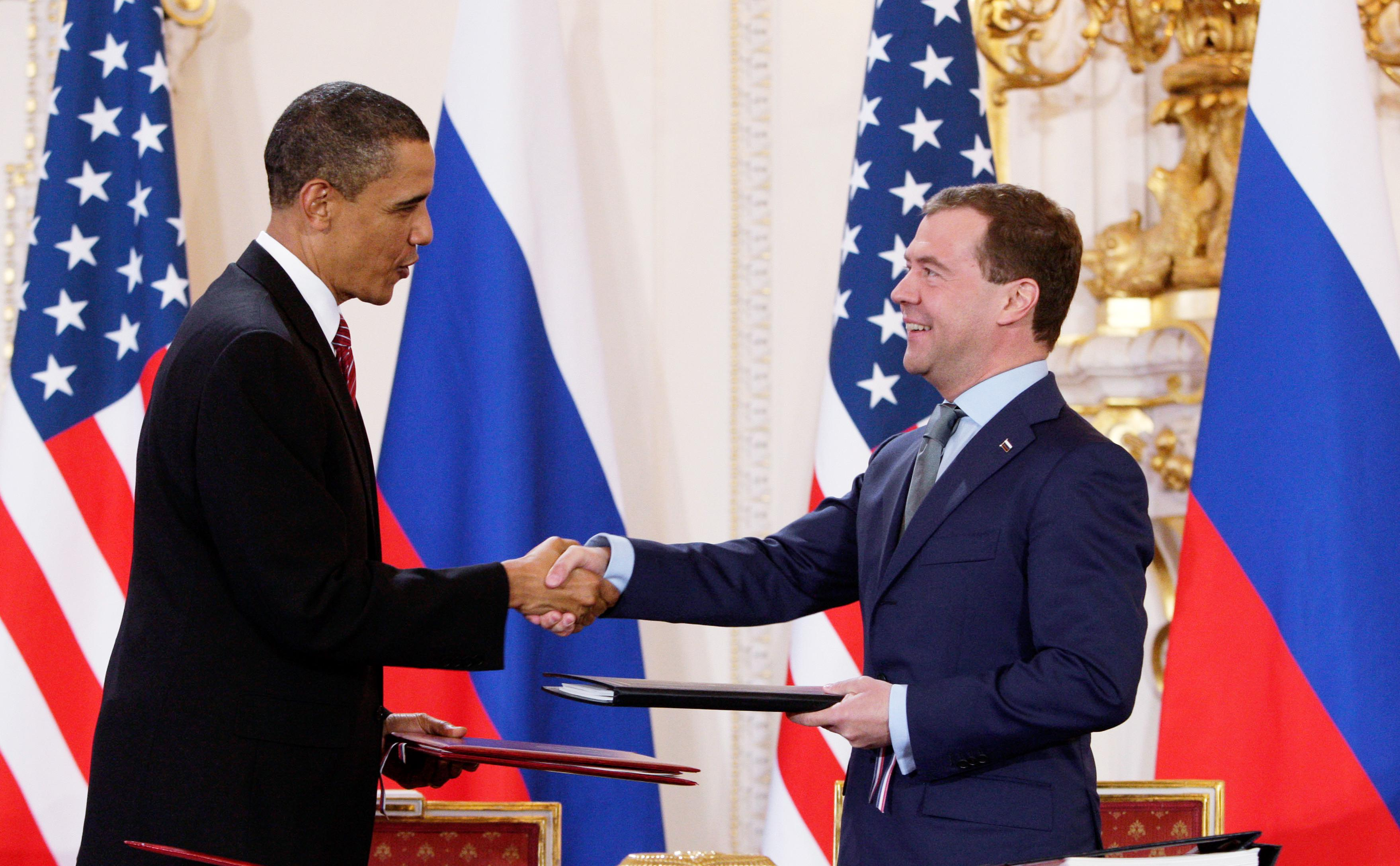
President Dmitry Medvedev with U.S. President Barack Obama after signing the New START treaty on nuclear disarmament in 2010, which was suspended by Putin in 2023

On 31 December 1999, President Yeltsin unexpectedly resigned, handing the post to the recently appointed prime minister and his chosen successor, Vladimir Putin. Putin then won the 2000 presidential election, and defeated the Chechen insurgency in the Second Chechen War.

Putin won a second presidential term in 2004. High oil prices and a rise in foreign investment saw the Russian economy and living standards improve significantly. Putin's rule increased stability, while transforming Russia into an authoritarian state. In 2008, Putin took the post of prime minister, while Dmitry Medvedev was elected President for one term, to hold onto power despite legal term limits; this period has been described as a "tandemocracy".

Following a diplomatic standoff with neighbouring Georgia in 2008, Russian forces invaded the country from 1–16 August 2008 and occupied territories that it has since considered as independent states, Abkhazia and South Ossetia. The conflict marked the first war in Europe in the 21st century. The 2008 constitutional amendments saw the terms of the president extend to six years and the lower house (State Duma) to five years. Putin then went on to win the 2012 presidential election, which fuelled the "Snow Revolution" protests.

==== Russo-Ukrainian war and 2022 invasion ====
Map of Ukraine as of December 2025: Continuously controlled by Ukraine Currently occupied or controlled by Russia Formerly occupied by Russia

In 2014, following a pro-Western revolution in Ukraine, Russia invaded and annexed Crimea. It also supported an insurgency in the Donbas region of eastern Ukraine, and aided pro-Russian separatists waging a war against the Ukrainian government. The frozen conflict escalated into a full-scale Russian invasion of the remainder of Ukraine on 24 February 2022, initiating the largest conventional war in Europe since World War II.

The invasion met with international condemnation, and expanded sanctions against Russia. Russia was expelled from the Council of Europe in March 2022, and subsequently suspended from the United Nations Human Rights Council the following month. In March 2023, the International Criminal Court issued an arrest warrant for Putin on charges of war crimes, and in June 2024, it issued arrest warrants for senior Russian military officials, including Valery Gerasimov and Sergei Shoigu, on charges of war crimes and crimes against humanity.

Russia initially made rapid advances in the northern and eastern fronts, yet failed to capture Kyiv and overthrow the Ukrainian government, leading to a subsequent withdrawal from the north. In September 2022, Russia proclaimed the annexation of four partially-occupied Ukrainian regions, which was internationally denounced as illegal. Following the annexations, the conflict has settled into a war of attrition in the southern and eastern fronts, with Russian forces making slow, limited advances and suffering heavy casualties. Russian forces occupied about a fifth of Ukraine's territory at the end of 2025.

== Geography ==
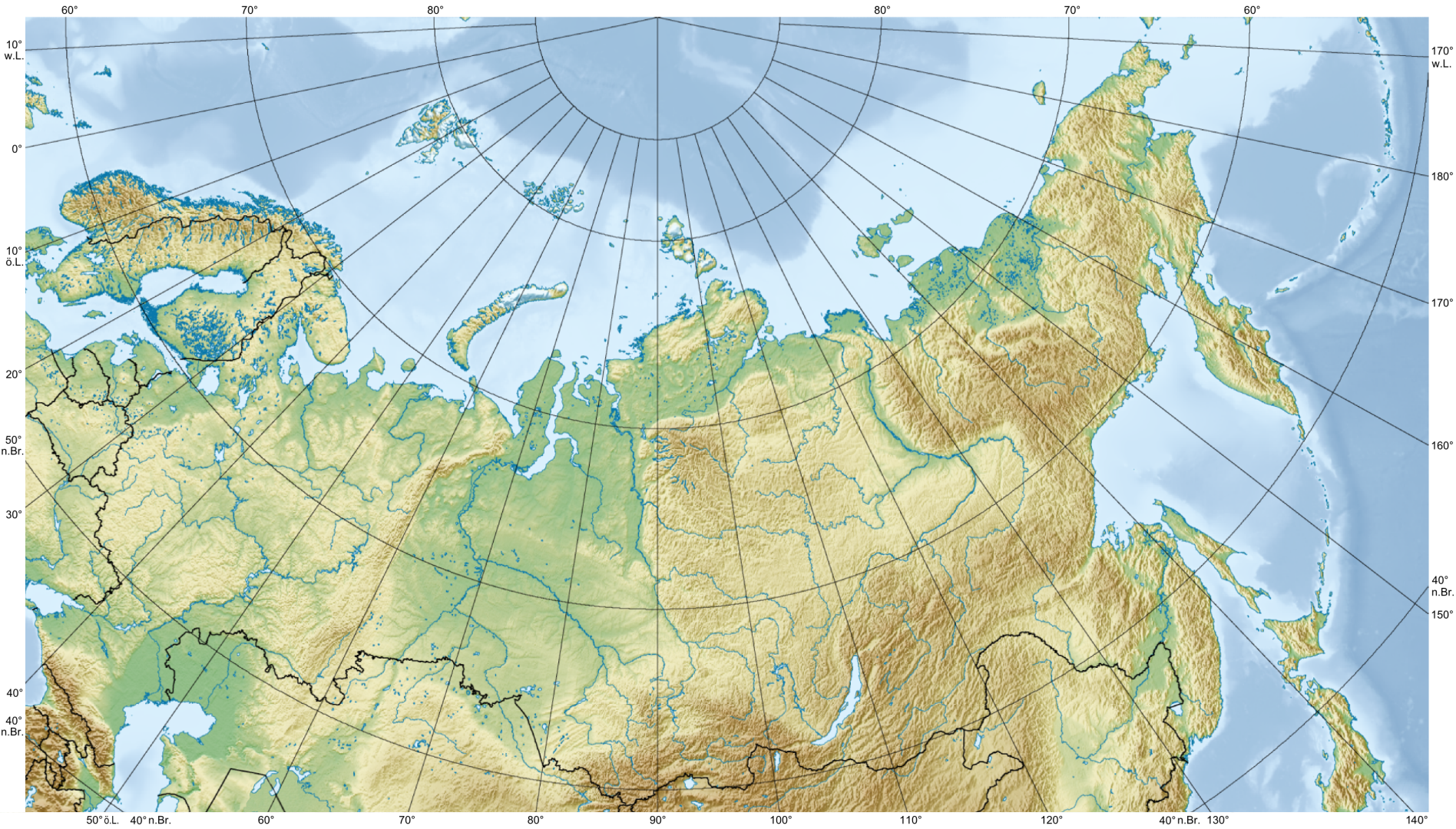
Topographic map of Russia

Russia's vast landmass stretches over the easternmost part of Europe and the northernmost part of Asia. It spans the northernmost edge of Eurasia and has the world's fourth-longest coastline, of over 37,653 km (23,396 mi). (Note: Russia has an additional 850 km (530 mi) of coastline along the Caspian Sea, which is the world's largest inland body of water, and has been variously classified as a sea or a lake.) Russia lies between latitudes 41° and 82° N, and longitudes 19° E and 169° W, extending some 9,000 km (5,600 mi) east to west, and 2,500 to 4,000 km (1,600 to 2,500 mi) north to south. Russia, by landmass, is larger than three continents, (Note: Russia, by land area, is larger than the continents of Australia, Antarctica, and Europe, although it covers a large part of the latter itself. Its land area could be roughly compared to that of South America.) and has the same surface area as Pluto.

Russia has nine major mountain ranges, and they are found along the southernmost regions, which share a significant portion of the Caucasus Mountains (containing Mount Elbrus, which at 5,642 m (18,510 ft) is the highest peak in Russia and Europe); the Altai and Sayan Mountains in Siberia; and in the East Siberian Mountains and the Kamchatka Peninsula in the Russian Far East (containing Klyuchevskaya Sopka, which at 4,750 m (15,584 ft) is the highest active volcano in Eurasia). The Ural Mountains, running north to south through the country's west, are rich in mineral resources, and form the traditional boundary between Europe and Asia. The lowest point in Russia and Europe, is situated at the head of the Caspian Sea, where the Caspian Depression reaches some 29 metres (95.1 ft) below sea level.

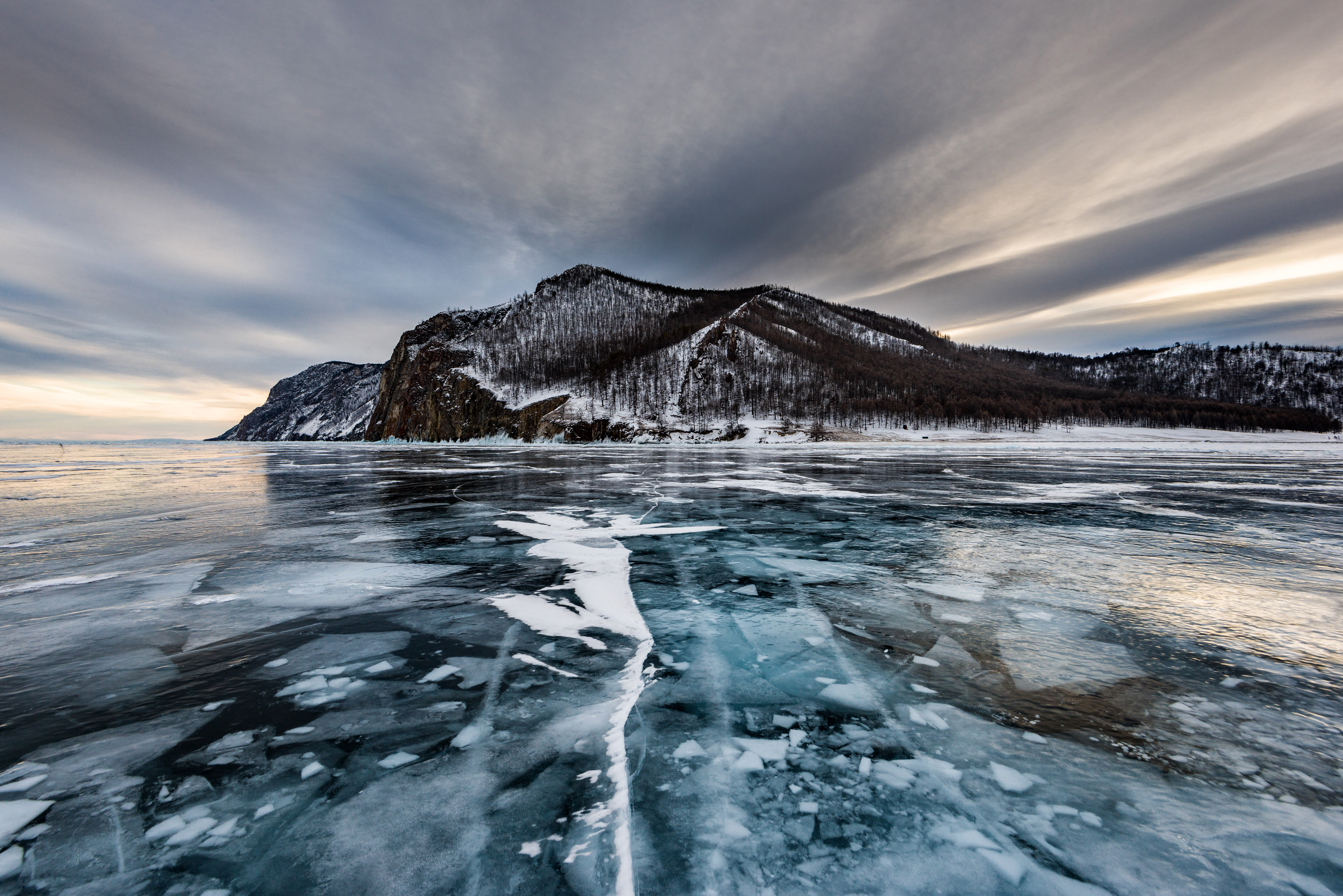
Frozen Lake Baikal near Olkhon Island, the third-largest lake island in the world

Russia, as one of the world's only three countries bordering three oceans, has links with a great number of seas. (Note: Russia borders, clockwise, to its southwest: the Black Sea and the Sea of Azov, to its west: the Baltic Sea, to its north: the Barents Sea (White Sea, Pechora Sea), the Kara Sea, the Laptev Sea, and the East Siberian Sea, to its northeast: the Chukchi Sea and the Bering Sea, and to its southeast: the Sea of Okhotsk and the Sea of Japan.) Its major islands and archipelagos include Novaya Zemlya, Franz Josef Land, Severnaya Zemlya, the New Siberian Islands, Wrangel Island, the Kuril Islands (four of which are disputed with Japan), and Sakhalin. The Diomede Islands, administered by Russia and the United States, are just 3.8 km (2.4 mi) apart; and Kunashir Island of the Kuril Islands is merely 20 km (12.4 mi) from Hokkaido, Japan.

Russia has one of the world's largest surface water resources and is second only to Brazil by total renewable water resources. Its lakes contain approximately one-quarter of the world's liquid fresh water. Lake Baikal, the largest and most prominent among Russia's fresh water bodies, is the world's deepest, purest, oldest and most capacious fresh water lake, containing over one-fifth of the world's fresh surface water. Ladoga and Onega in northwestern Russia are two of the largest lakes in Europe. Russia has over 100,000 rivers; the Volga in western Russia, which is widely regarded as the national river, is the longest river in Europe and forms the Volga Delta, the largest river delta in the continent. The Siberian rivers of Ob, Yenisey, Lena, and Amur are among the world's longest rivers.

=== Climate ===
The size of Russia and the remoteness of many of its areas from the sea result in the dominance of the humid continental climate throughout most of the country, except for the tundra in the far north and the extreme southwest. Mountain ranges in the south and east obstruct the flow of warm air masses from the Indian and Pacific oceans, while the European Plain spanning its west and north opens it to influence from the Atlantic and Arctic oceans. Most of northwest Russia and Siberia have a subarctic climate, with extremely severe winters in the inner regions of northeast Siberia (mostly Sakha, where the Northern Pole of Cold is located with the record low temperature of −71.2 °C or −96.2 °F), and more moderate winters elsewhere. Russia's vast coastline along the Arctic Ocean and the Russian Arctic islands have a polar climate.

Köppen climate classification of Russia

The coastal part of Krasnodar Krai on the Black Sea, most notably Sochi, and some coastal and interior strips of the North Caucasus possess a humid subtropical climate with mild and wet winters. In many regions of East Siberia and the Russian Far East, winter is dry compared to summer, while other parts of the country experience more even precipitation across seasons. Winter precipitation in most parts of the country usually falls as snow. The westernmost parts of Kaliningrad Oblast and some parts in the south of Krasnodar Krai and the North Caucasus have an oceanic climate. The region along the Lower Volga and Caspian Sea coast, as well as some southernmost slivers of Siberia, possess a semi-arid climate.

Throughout much of the territory, there are only two distinct seasons, winter and summer, as spring and autumn are usually brief. The coldest month is January (February on the coastline); the warmest is usually July. Great ranges of temperature are typical. In winter, temperatures get colder both from south to north and from west to east. Summers can be quite hot, even in Siberia. Climate change in Russia is causing more frequent wildfires, and thawing the country's large expanse of permafrost.

=== Biodiversity ===
Russia, owing to its gigantic size, has diverse ecosystems, including polar deserts, tundra, forest-tundra, taiga, mixed and broadleaf forest, forest steppe, steppe, semi-desert, and subtropics. About half of Russia's territory is forested, and it has the world's largest area of forest.

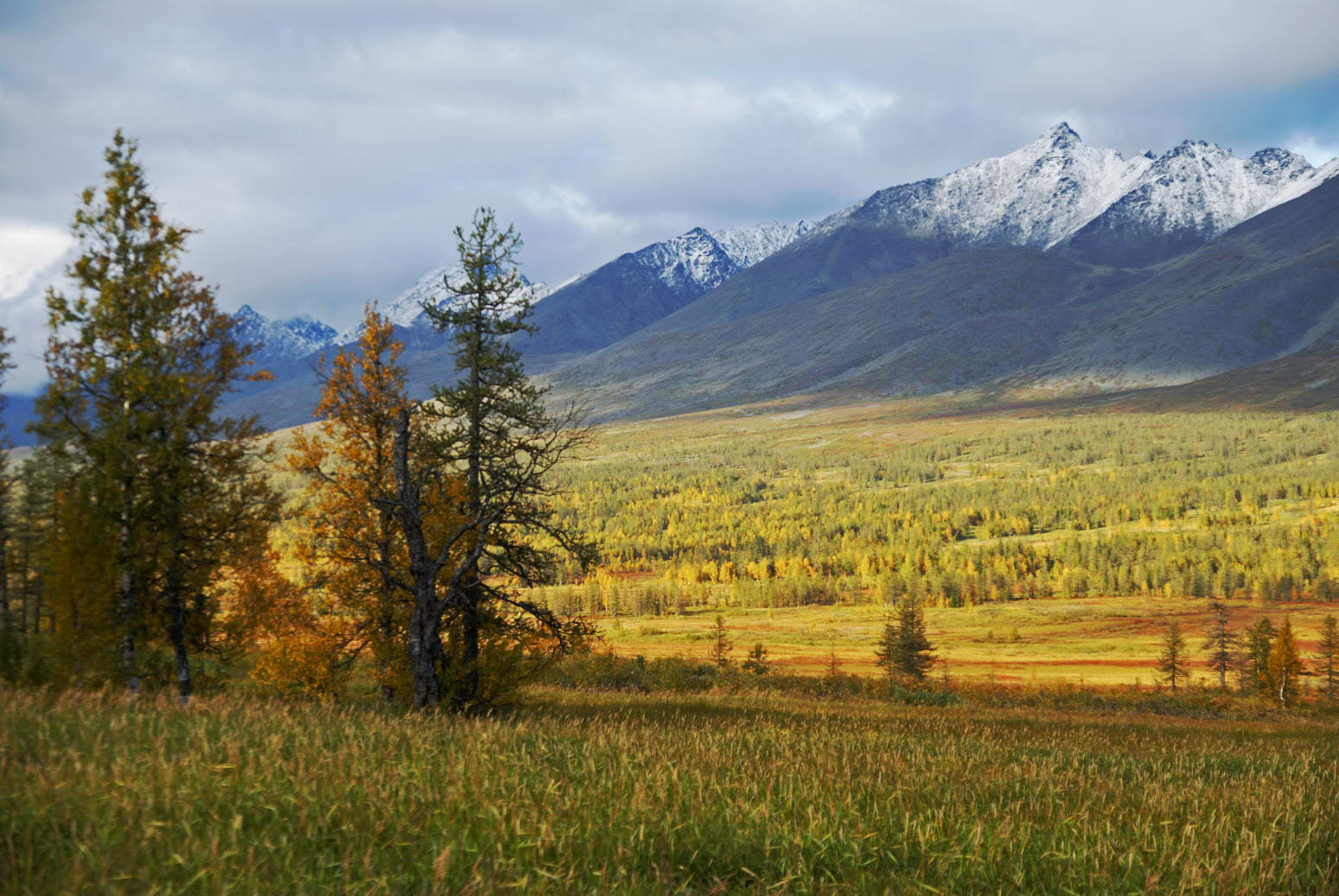
Yugyd Va National Park in the Komi Republic is the largest national park in Europe.

Russian biodiversity includes 12,500 species of vascular plants, 2,200 species of bryophytes, about 3,000 species of lichens, 7,000–9,000 species of algae, and 20,000–25,000 species of fungi. Russian fauna is composed of 320 species of mammals, over 732 species of birds, 75 species of reptiles, about 30 species of amphibians, 343 species of freshwater fish (high endemism), approximately 1,500 species of saltwater fishes, 9 species of cyclostomata, and approximately 100–150,000 invertebrates (high endemism). Approximately 1,100 rare and endangered plant and animal species are included in the Russian Red Data Book.

Russia's natural ecosystems are conserved in nearly 15,000 specially protected natural territories of various statuses, occupying more than 10% of the country's total area. They include 45 biosphere reserves, 64 national parks, and 101 nature reserves. Although in decline, the country still has many ecosystems which are still considered intact forest, mainly in the northern taiga areas, and the subarctic tundra of Siberia. Russia had a Forest Landscape Integrity Index mean score of 9.02 in 2019, ranking 10th out of 172 countries, and the first ranked major nation globally.

== Government and politics ==
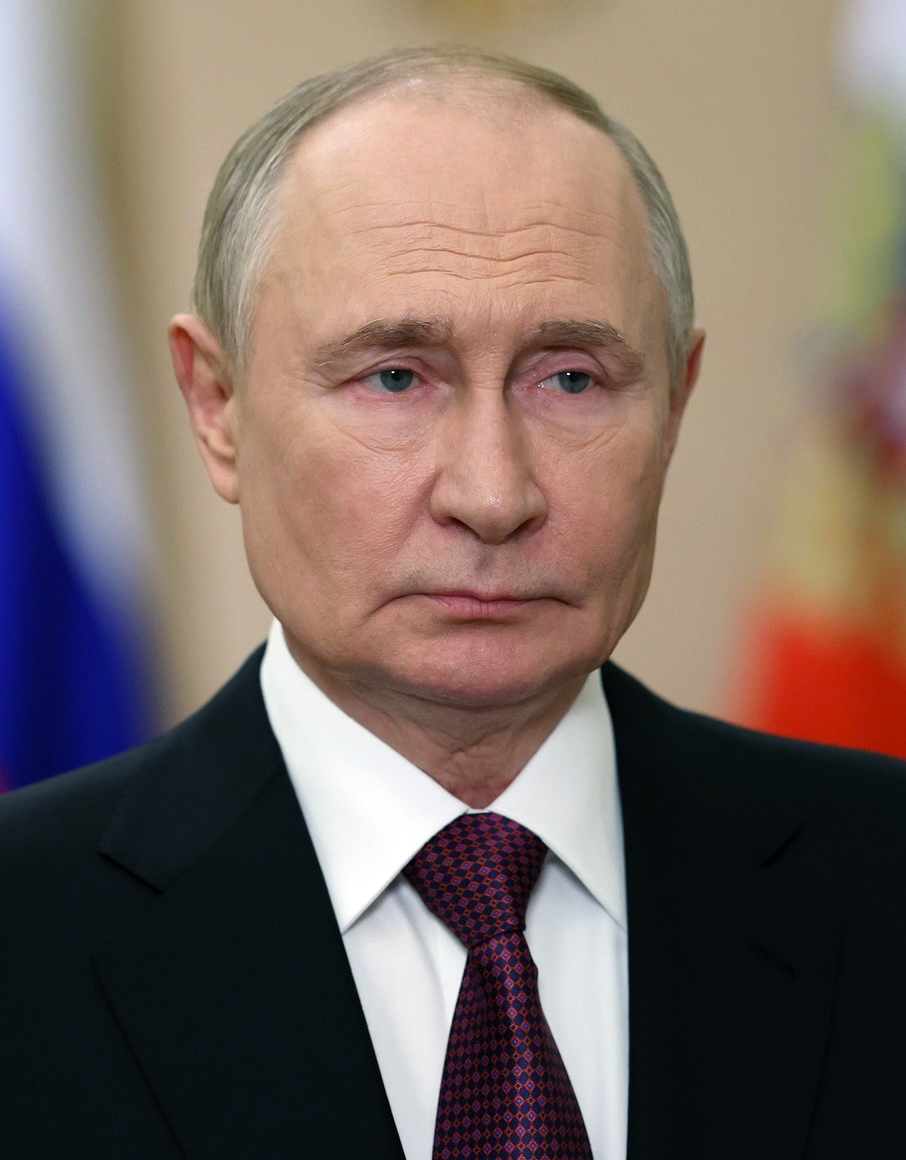
Vladimir Putin
President

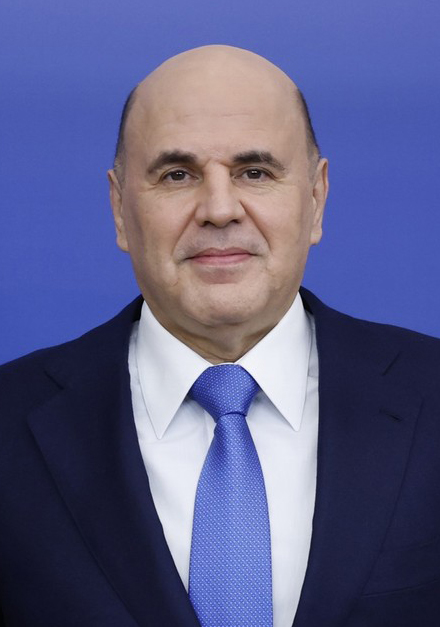
Mikhail Mishustin
Prime Minister

Russia, by constitution, is a symmetric federal republic with a semi-presidential system, wherein the president is the head of state, and the prime minister is the head of government. It is officially structured as a multi-party representative democracy, with the federal government composed of three branches:

- Legislative: The bicameral Federal Assembly of Russia, made up of the 450-member State Duma and the 170-member Federation Council, adopts federal law, declares war, approves treaties, has the power of the purse and the power of impeachment of the president.
- Executive: The president is the commander-in-chief of the Armed Forces, and appoints the Government of Russia (Cabinet) and other officers, who administer and enforce federal laws and policies. The president may issue decrees of unlimited scope, so long as they do not contradict the constitution or federal law.
- Judiciary: The Constitutional Court, Supreme Court and lower federal courts, whose judges are appointed by the Federation Council on the recommendation of the president, interpret laws and can overturn laws they deem unconstitutional.

The president is elected by popular vote for a six-year term and may be elected no more than twice. (Note: In 2020, constitutional amendments were signed into law that limit the president to two terms overall rather than two consecutive terms, with this limit reset for current and previous presidents.) Ministries of the government are composed of the premier and his deputies, ministers, and selected other individuals; all are appointed by the president on the recommendation of the prime minister (whereas the appointment of the latter requires the consent of the State Duma). United Russia is the dominant political party in Russia and has been described as "big tent" and the "party of power".

=== Political history ===
A chart of the political system in the modern Russian Federation

While there is scholarly debate over the significance of the veche in the Middle Ages as a representative political body, Russian society has historically been ruled by various forms of autocracy. This pattern of a centralised ruling system has its roots in the late Middle Ages, with a unified Russian state being established as an absolute monarchy in the late 15th century, a governance structure that was followed until the early 20th century. Following the 1917 Russian Revolution, the monarchy was abolished, and the Soviet Union was proclaimed as a one-party communist state until its collapse. Brief periods of non-autocratic rule include the short-lived Provisional Government in 1917 established during the February Revolution, and during the transition of post-Soviet Russia into a flawed democracy during the presidency of Boris Yeltsin in the 1990s.

In the 21st century, following the presidencies of Vladimir Putin and Dmitry Medvedev, Russia has experienced significant democratic backsliding. The political system evolved from electoral authoritarianism into a consolidated authoritarian regime. Some political scientists have characterised Putin as the head of a dictatorship, or a personalist regime. Putin's second tenure as president has led to further autocratization, which has been the most significant since the Soviet era, with some authors suggesting a regeneration of totalitarian elements. Putin's ruling policies are generally referred to as Putinism.

=== Political divisions ===
Russia, by constitution, is a symmetric federation with the possibility of an asymmetric configuration. Unlike the Soviet asymmetric model of the RSFSR, where only republics were "subjects of the federation", the current constitution raised the status of other regions to the level of republics and made all regions equal with the title "subject of the federation". The regions of Russia have reserved areas of competence, but regions do not have sovereignty, do not have the status of a sovereign state, do not have the right to indicate any sovereignty in their constitutions and do not have the right to secede from the country. The laws of the regions cannot contradict federal laws.

The federal subjects (Note: Including bodies on territory disputed between Russia and Ukraine whose annexation has not been internationally recognised: the Republic of Crimea and the federal city of Sevastopol since the annexation of Crimea in 2014, and territories set up following the Russian annexation of Donetsk, Kherson, Luhansk and Zaporizhzhia oblasts in 2022.) have equal representation—two delegates each—in the Federation Council, the upper house of the Federal Assembly. However, they differ in the degree of autonomy they enjoy. The federal districts of Russia were established by Putin in 2000 to facilitate central government control of the federal subjects. Originally seven, currently there are eight federal districts, each headed by an envoy appointed by the president.

Federal subjects	Governance
46 oblasts	The most common type of federal subject with a governor and locally elected legislature. Commonly named after their administrative centres.
22 republics	Each is nominally autonomous—home to a specific ethnic minority, and has its own constitution, language, and legislature, but is represented by the federal government in international affairs.
9 krais	For all intents and purposes, krais are legally identical to oblasts. The title "krai" ("frontier" or "territory") is historic, related to geographic (frontier) position in a certain period of history. The current krais are not related to frontiers.
4 autonomous okrugs	Occasionally referred to as "autonomous district", "autonomous area", and "autonomous region", each with a substantial or predominant ethnic minority.
3 federal cities	Major cities that function as separate regions (Moscow and Saint Petersburg, as well as Sevastopol in Russian-occupied Ukraine).
1 autonomous oblast	The only autonomous oblast is the Jewish Autonomous Oblast.

=== Foreign relations ===
Russia Countries on Russia's "unfriendly countries and territories list" The list includes Russia's geopolitical rivals—member states of the European Union and NATO and their allies—that have imposed sanctions against it for its invasion of Ukraine.

Russia has the sixth-largest diplomatic network in the world as of 2024. It maintains diplomatic relations with 187 United Nations member states, two partially-recognised states, and two United Nations observer states, along with 143 embassies. As the legal successor of the Soviet Union, Russia retains its seat as a permanent member of the United Nations Security Council. It is generally described by political analysts as a great power. Russia is also a former superpower as the leading constituent of the former Soviet Union. In the 21st century, many scholars view its global influence as being in decline. Russia is a member state of the G20, the OSCE, BRICS, WTO, and the APEC; and the leading member state of organisations such as the CIS, the EAEU, the CSTO, and the SCO. It was also a member state of the G8 (now the G7) and part of the Council of Europe before its expulsion from the two groups in 2014 and 2022, respectively.

Russia maintains close relations with neighbouring Belarus, which is a part of the Union State, a supranational confederation of the two states. Serbia has been a historically close ally of Russia, as both countries share a strong mutual cultural, ethnic, and religious affinity. From the 21st century, relations between Russia and China have significantly strengthened bilaterally and economically due to shared political interests. India is the largest customer of Russian military equipment, and the two countries share a strong strategic and diplomatic relationship since the Soviet era. Russia wields significant political influence across the geopolitically important South Caucasus and Central Asia, described in Russia as the "near abroad", while foreign political analysts have described the two regions as being part of Russia's "backyard".

Russia shares a complex strategic, energy, and defence relationship with Turkey. It maintains cordial relations with Iran, as it is a strategic and economic ally. Russia has also significantly developed its relations with North Korea following its invasion of Ukraine in 2022, with increased defence co-operation. At the same time, its relations with neighbouring Ukraine and the Western world—specifically the United States and the countries of the European Union and NATO—have collapsed.

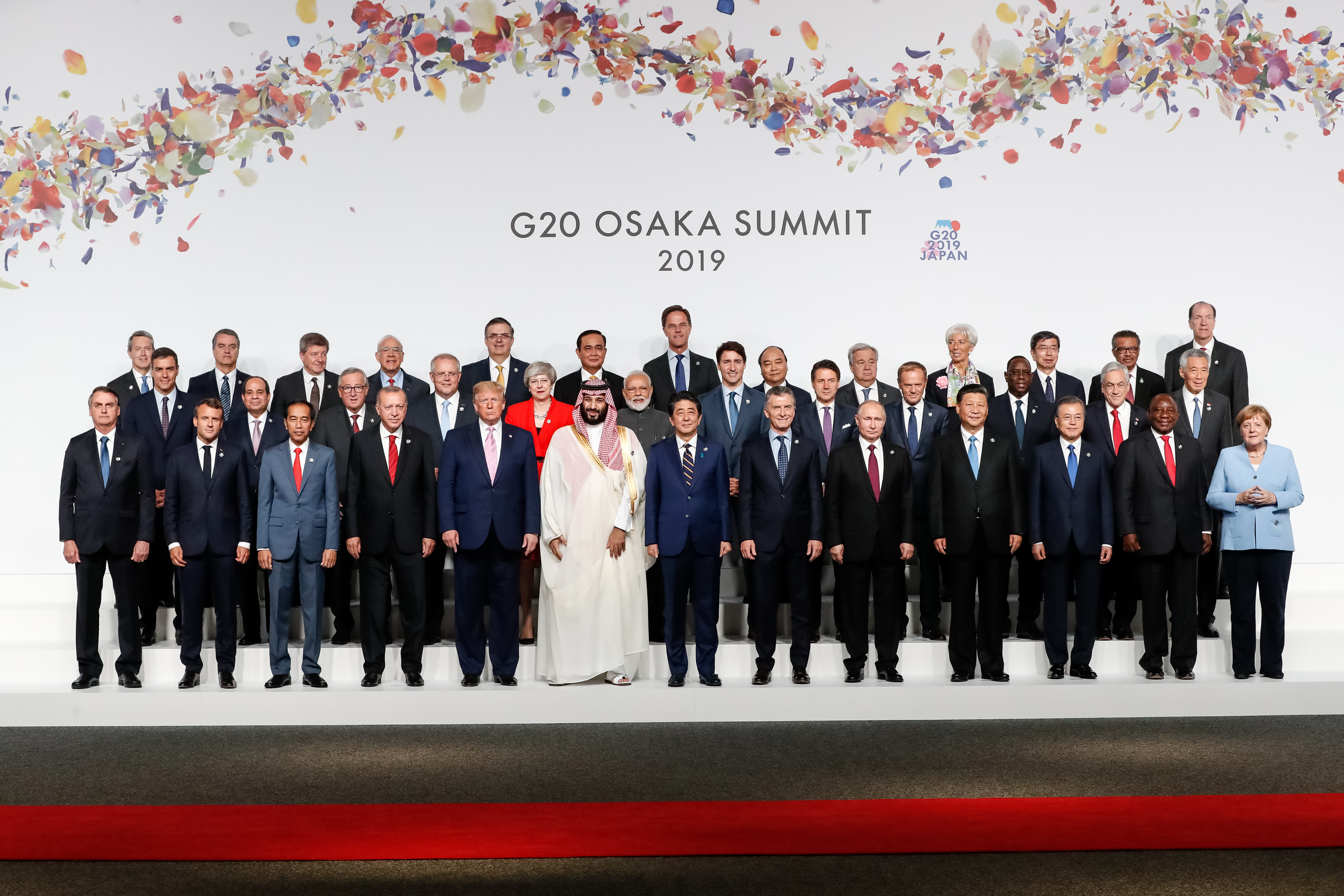
Putin with G20 counterparts in Osaka, 2019

In the 21st century, Russia has pursued an aggressive foreign policy aimed at securing regional dominance in Europe and increasing its international influence, as well as increasing domestic support for the government. It has initiated military interventions in the post-Soviet states of Georgia and Ukraine, as well as in Syria during its prolonged civil war in a bid to increase its influence in the Middle East, and achieve its great power ambitions. Two-thirds of the global population, specifically the developing countries of the Global South, are either neutral or leaning towards Russia politically. Russian state-funded Wagner Group has been deployed in Africa (Africa Corps), and in Syria; to maintain political stability in failed states through military projection and exploit local natural resources. Russia has also increasingly pushed to expand its influence across the Arctic, the Asia–Pacific, and Latin America. It has also continued using subversive tactics in its rival countries to project its geopolitical power, such as cyberwarfare, disinformation campaigns, sabotage attacks, assassination attempts, airspace violations, electoral interferences, nuclear sabre-rattling, and hybrid warfare.

=== Military ===
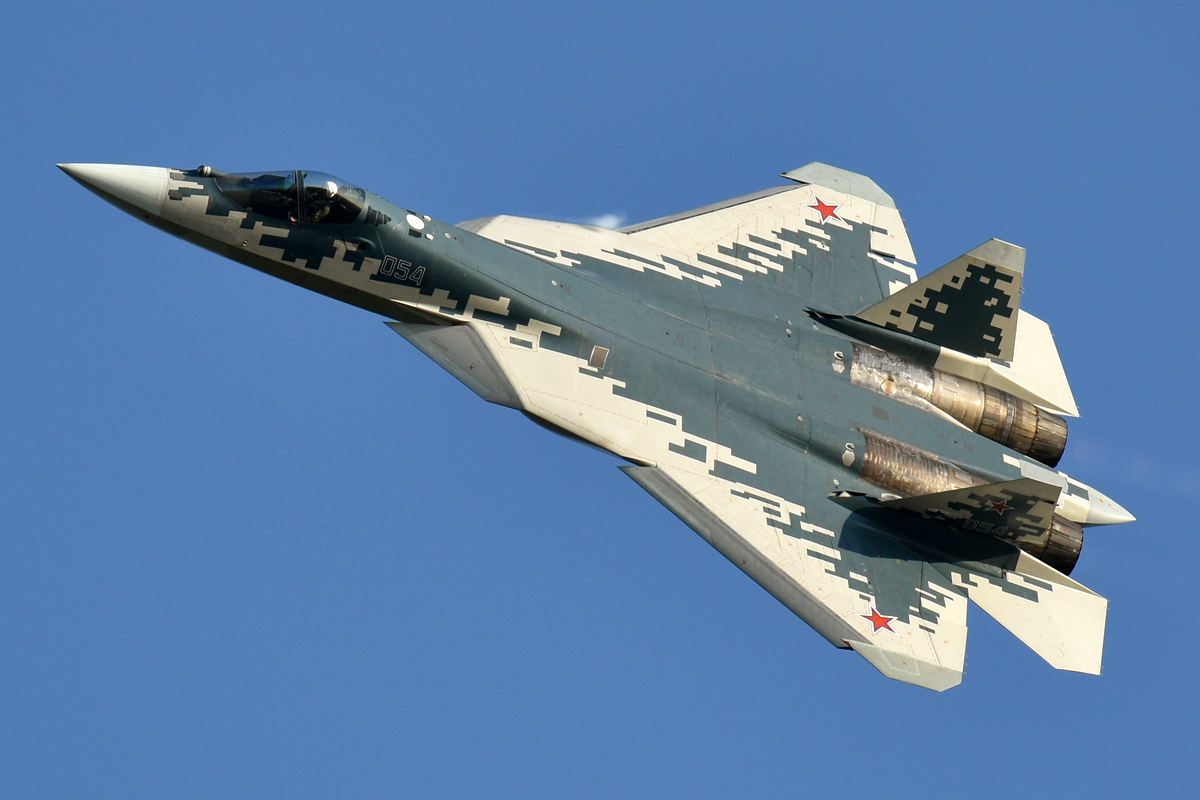
Sukhoi Su-57, a fifth-generation fighter of the Russian Air Force

The Russian Armed Forces are divided into the Ground Forces, the Navy, and the Aerospace Forces—and there are also two independent arms of service: the Strategic Missile Troops and the Airborne Troops. As of 2025, the military have 1.1 million active-duty personnel, which is the world's fifth-largest, and about 1.5 million reserve personnel. It is mandatory for all male citizens aged 18–27 to be drafted for a year of service in the Armed Forces.

Russia is among the five recognised nuclear-weapons states, with the world's largest stockpile of nuclear weapons; over half of the world's nuclear weapons are owned by Russia. Russia possesses the second-largest fleet of ballistic missile submarines, and is one of the only three countries operating strategic bombers. As of 2025, Russia maintains the world's third-highest military expenditure, spending $190 billion, corresponding to about 7.5% of its GDP. It was also the third-largest arms exporter in 2020–2024, and has a large and indigenous defence industry, which produces the majority of its military equipment.

=== Law, corruption and crime ===
Post-Soviet Russia under the regime of Vladimir Putin has been governed by a form of crony capitalism. Its political system has been variously described as a kleptocracy, an oligarchy, and a plutocracy. As of 2025, it is the lowest rated European country in Transparency International's annual Corruption Perceptions Index, ranking 157th out of the 180 countries listed.

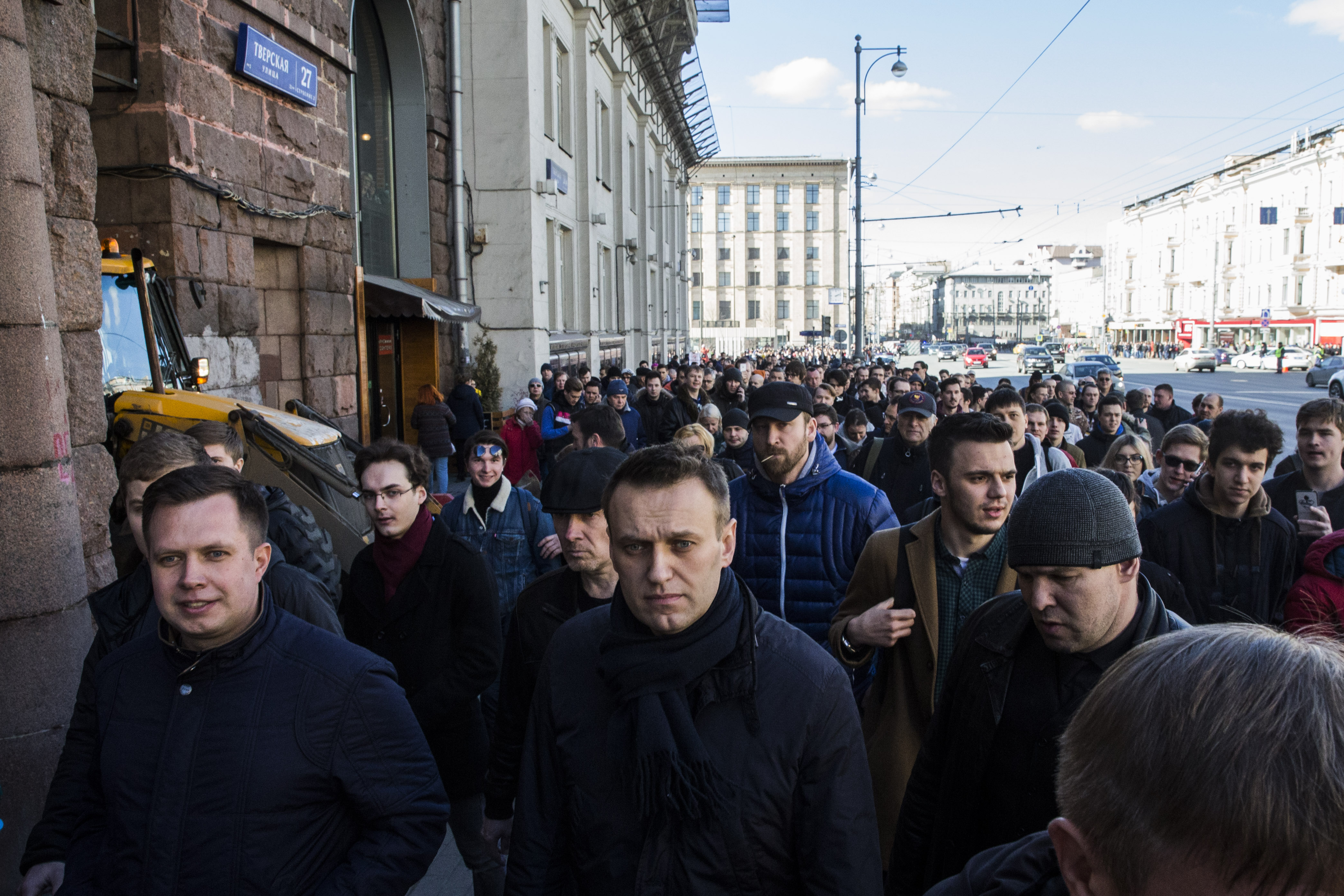
Opposition leader Alexei Navalny leading protestors in Moscow in the nationwide anti-corruption protests of 2017–2018

Corruption has significantly increased following the collapse of the Soviet Union, and is seen as a significant issue in society. It affects various sectors, including the economy, the government, law enforcement, healthcare, education, and the military. Russia's shadow economy was estimated to be about 44% of the total GDP in 2018. Penal military units have been deployed as storm troops during the ongoing Russo-Ukrainian War since 2022, such as the Storm-Z and Storm-V units. According to estimates by the BBC, around 48,000 prisoners were recruited to fight for the Wagner Group.

The primary and fundamental statement of laws in Russia is the constitution. Statutes, such as the Russian Civil Code and the Russian Criminal Code, are the predominant legal sources of Russian law. Russia has the largest incarcerated population in Europe, and the fifth-largest incarcerated population in the world. Its incarceration rate is among the highest in Europe, although the number has fallen steadily, by 59% since 2000. As of 2021, Russia's intentional homicide rate stood at 6.8 per 100,000 people. In 2023, Russia had the world's second-largest illegal arms trade market, after the United States, was described as a key hub for human trafficking, and was ranked first in Europe and 19th globally in the Global Organized Crime Index.

=== Human rights ===
Violations of human rights in Russia have been increasingly reported by leading democracy and human rights groups. In particular, Amnesty International and Human Rights Watch say that Russia is not democratic and allows few political rights and civil liberties to its citizens.

Since 2004, Freedom House has ranked Russia as "not free" in its Freedom in the World survey. Since 2011, the Economist Intelligence Unit has ranked Russia as an "authoritarian regime" in its Democracy Index, ranking it 148th out of 167 countries in 2025. In regards to media freedom, Russia was ranked 172th out of 180 countries in Reporters Without Borders' Press Freedom Index for 2026. The Russian government has been widely criticised by political dissidents and human rights activists for unfair elections, crackdowns on opposition political parties and protests, persecution of non-governmental organisations and enforced suppression and killings of independent journalists, and censorship of mass media and internet.

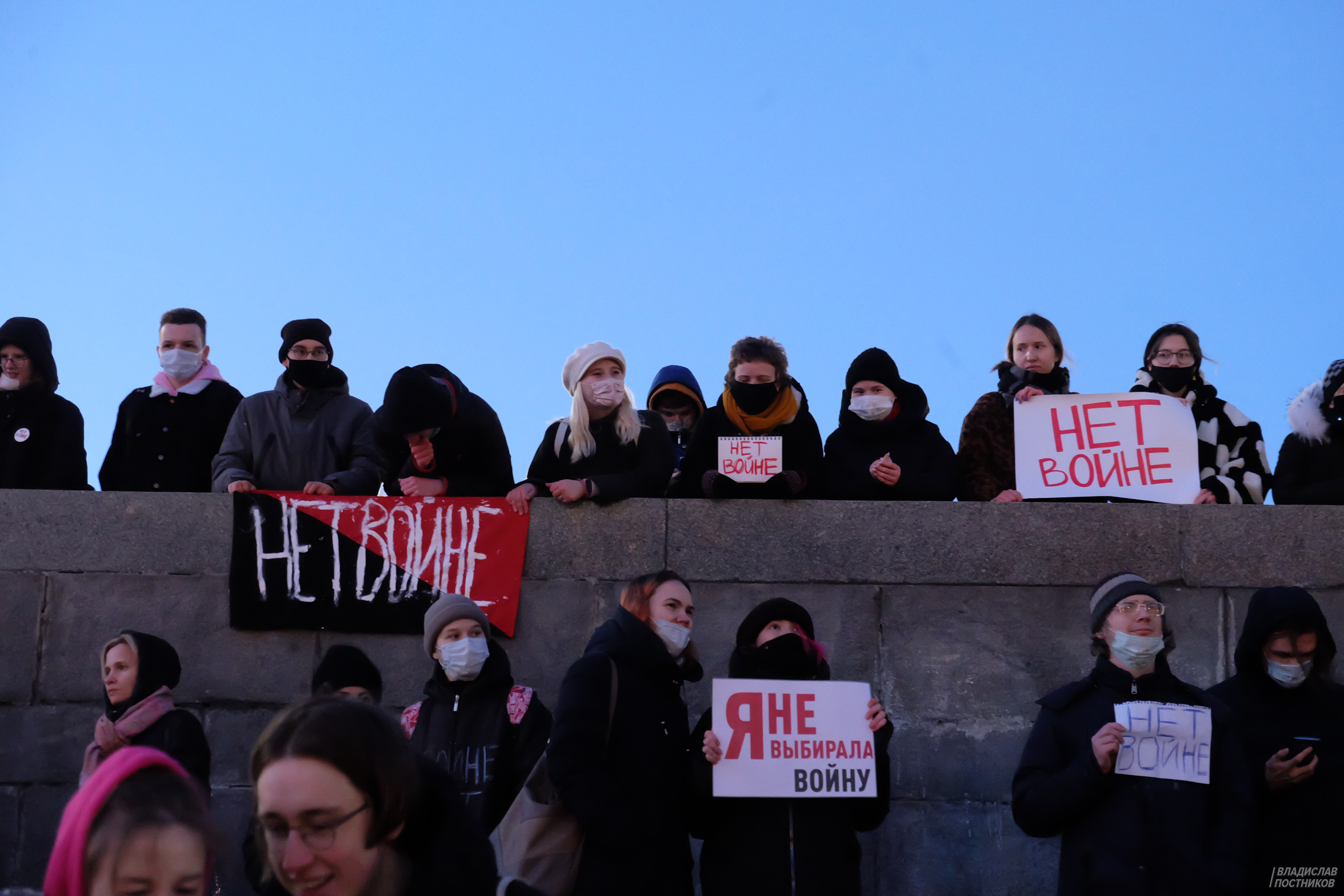
Following the 2022 Russian invasion of Ukraine, anti-war protests broke out across Russia. The protests have been met with widespread repression, leading to about 15,000 people being arrested.

Muslims, especially Salafis, have faced persecution in Russia. To quash the insurgency in the North Caucasus, Russian authorities have been accused of indiscriminate killings, arrests, forced disappearances, and torture of civilians. In Dagestan, some Salafis along with facing government harassment based on their appearance, have had their homes blown up in counterinsurgency operations. Chechens and Ingush in Russian prisons reportedly take more abuse than other ethnic groups. During the 2022 invasion of Ukraine, Russia has set up filtration camps where many Ukrainians are subjected to abuses and forcibly sent to Russia; the camps have been compared to those used in the Chechen Wars. Political repression also increased following the start of the invasion, with laws adopted that establish punishments for "discrediting" the armed forces.

Russia has introduced several restrictions on LGBTQ rights. In 2013, an anti-LGBTQ law banning "gay propaganda" was unanimously passed by the State Duma and the Federation Council, later being signed into law by Vladimir Putin. In 2020, the Russian parliament legalised a constitutional ban on same-sex marriage, and in 2021 the Ministry of Justice designated the LGBTQ rights group Russian LGBT Network as a "foreign agent". In 2022, further amendments were made to the 2013 anti-LGBTQ law. In 2023, the Russian parliament passed a bill banning gender reassignment surgery for transgender people and the Supreme Court of Russia banned the international LGBTQ movement as "extremist", outlawing it in the country. In 2024, the Supreme Court issued the first convictions from the latter ruling.

== Economy ==
Russia has a high-income, industrialised, mixed market-oriented economy following a turbulent transition from the Soviet planned model during the 1990s. According to the International Monetary Fund, it has the eighth-largest economy by nominal GDP and the fourth-largest economy by GDP (PPP). As of 2023, the service sector accounts for roughly 57% of total GDP, followed by the industrial sector (30%), while the agricultural sector is the smallest, at 3% of total GDP. It has a labour force of about 72 million, which is the ninth-largest in the world. Russia's largest trading partner is China.

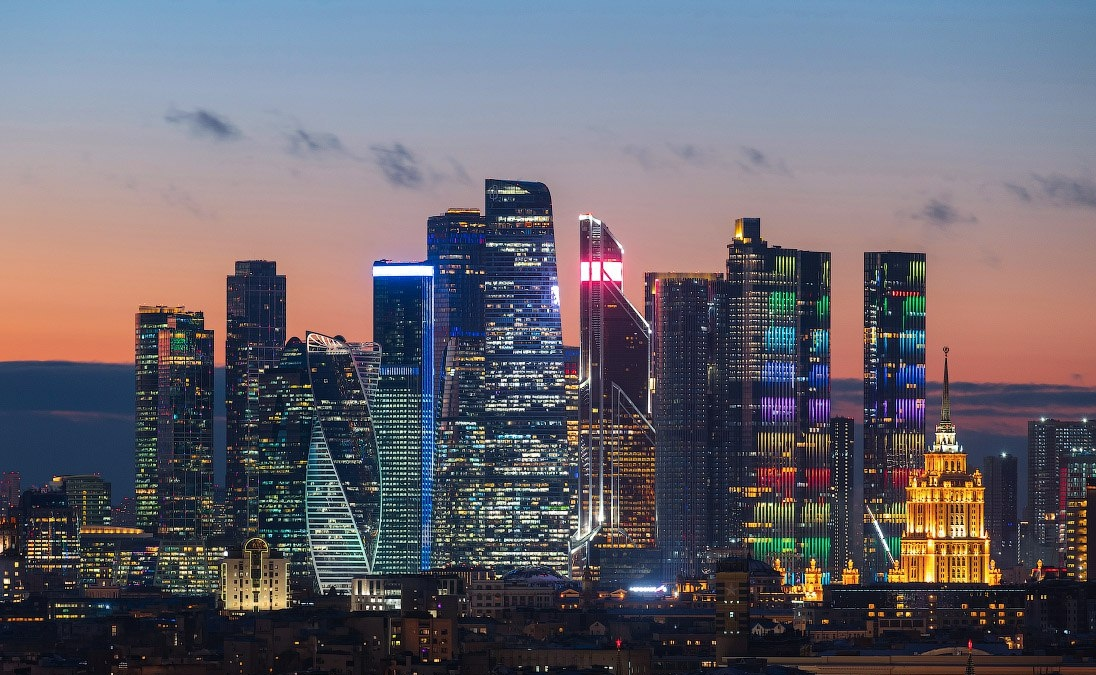
The Moscow International Business Center

Russia's human development is ranked as "very high" in the annual Human Development Index. Roughly 70% of Russia's total GDP is driven by final consumption, and the country has the world's twelfth-largest consumer market. According to Forbes, Russia has the fifth-highest number of billionaires in the world. However, its income inequality remains high compared to other developed countries. The variance of natural resources among its federal subjects has also led to regional economic disparities. High levels of corruption, declining oil export revenues, a shrinking labour force, human capital flight, and an aging and declining population also remain major barriers to future economic growth.

Following the 2022 Russian invasion of Ukraine, the country has faced extensive sanctions and other negative financial actions from the Western world and its allies which have the aim of isolating the Russian economy from the Western financial system. However, Russia has completed its transition into a war economy, and has shown resilience to such measures broadly, maintaining economic stability and growth—driven primarily by high military expenditure, rising household consumption and wages, low unemployment, and increased government spending. Yet, inflation has remained comparatively high, with experts predicting the sanctions will have a long-term negative effect on the Russian economy. Additionally, the international sanctions have led Russia to become heavily economically and technologically dependent on China.

=== Transport and energy ===
Railway transport in Russia is mostly controlled by the state-run Russian Railways. The total length of common-used railway tracks is the world's third-longest, exceeding 87,000 km (54,100 mi). As of 2019, Russia has the world's fifth-largest road network, with over 1.5 million km of roads. However, its road density is among the world's lowest, in part to its vast land area. Russia's inland waterways are the longest in the world, totalling 102,000 km (63,380 mi). It has over 900 airports, ranking seventh in the world, of which the busiest is Sheremetyevo International Airport in Moscow. The largest ports include the Port of Novorossiysk, the Great Port of Saint Petersburg and the Port of Vladivostok.

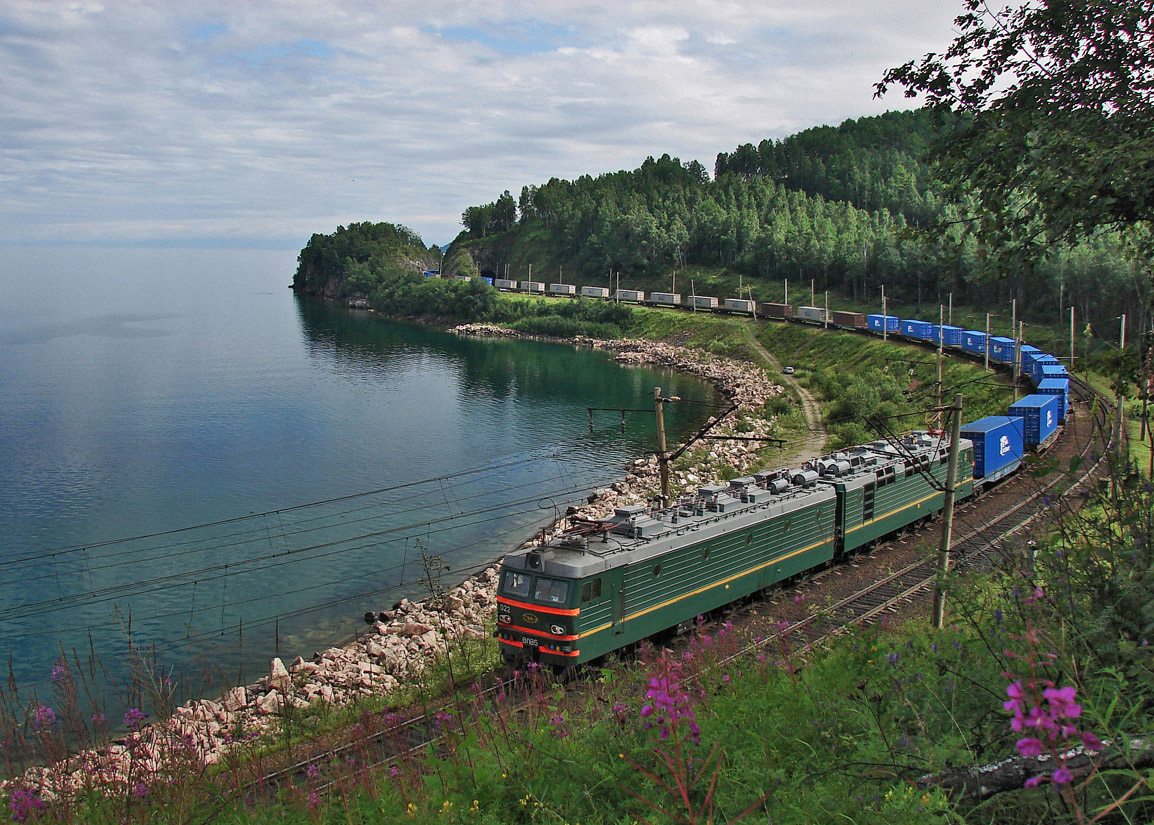
The Trans-Siberian Railway is the longest railway line in the world, connecting Moscow to Vladivostok.

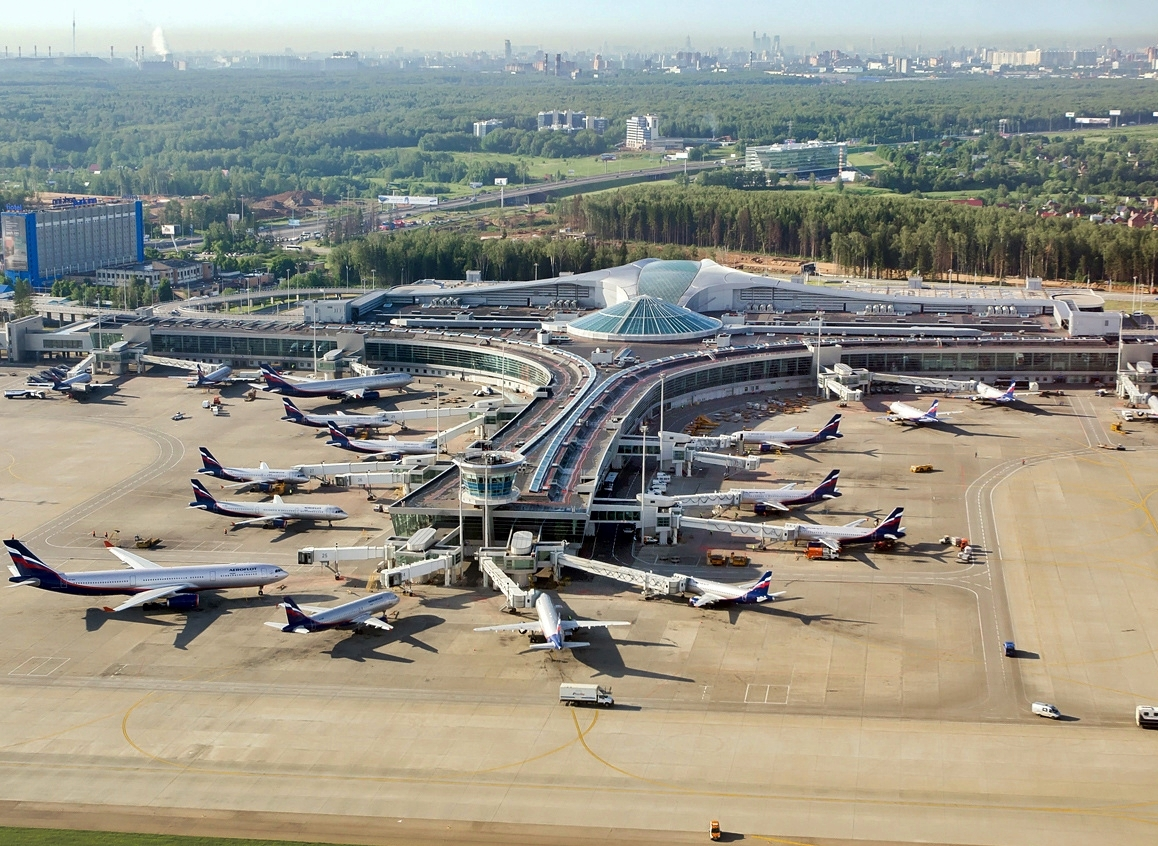
Sheremetyevo International Airport is the busiest airport in Russia.

Russia has one of the world's largest amounts of energy resources throughout its vast landmass, particularly natural gas and oil, which play a crucial role in its energy self-sufficiency and exports. It has been widely described as an energy superpower. Russia has the world's largest proven gas reserves, the second-largest coal reserves, the eighth-largest proven oil reserves, and the largest oil shale reserves in Europe. As of 2023, it is also the second-largest producer and the third-largest exporter of natural gas, as well as the second-largest producer and exporter of crude oil. Russia's large oil and gas sector accounted for 30% of its federal budget revenues in 2024, down from 50% in the mid-2010s, suggesting economic diversification.

Russia is the world's third-largest energy producer as of 2023. Fossil fuels account for over 64% of energy production and 87% of energy consumption. Natural gas is by far the largest source of energy, comprising over half of the energy production and 42% of electricity consumption. Russia was the first country to develop civilian nuclear power, building the world's first nuclear power plant in 1954, and remains a pioneer in nuclear energy technology and is considered a world leader in fast neutron reactors. Russia is the world's fourth-largest nuclear energy producer. Russian energy policy aims to expand the role of nuclear energy and develop new reactor technology. Russia is the sole country that builds and operates nuclear-powered icebreakers, which ease navigation along the Northern Sea Route, and aid in utilising its Arctic policy in its continental shelf.

Russia joined the Paris Agreement on climate change in 2015, and ratified the agreement in 2019. Its greenhouse gas emissions are the fourth-largest in the world as of 2023. Coal accounts for over 10% of its energy consumption. Russia is the fifth-largest hydroelectric producer as of 2022, with hydroelectric power contributing almost a fifth to the total energy generation (17%). Though it is the eighth-largest renewable energy producer as of 2023, the use and development of other renewable energy resources remain negligible, as Russia is among the few countries without strong governmental or public support for a renewable energy transition.

=== Agriculture and fishery ===
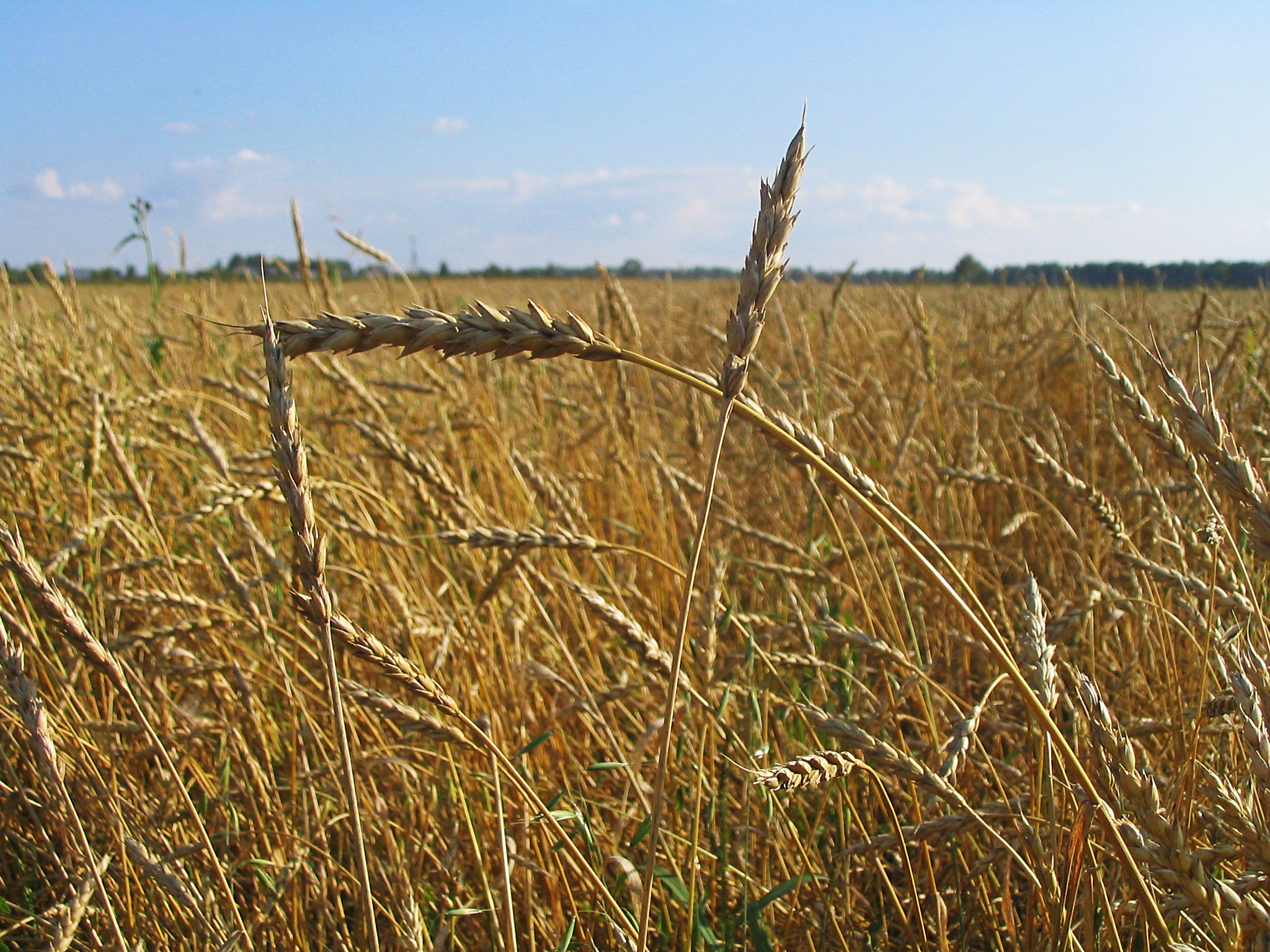
Wheat in Tomsk Oblast, Siberia

Agriculture, forestry and fishing contributes about 3.3% of the country's total GDP as of 2023. It has the world's fourth-largest cultivated area, at 1,265,267 square kilometres (488,522 sq mi). However, due to the harshness of its environment, only about 13.1% of its land is agricultural, with an additional 7.4% being arable. The country's agricultural land is considered part of the "breadbasket" of Europe. More than one-third of the sown area is devoted to fodder crops, and the remaining farmland is used industrial crops, vegetables, and fruits. The main product of Russian farming has always been grain, which occupies well over half the cropland. Russia is the world's largest exporter of wheat and the largest producer of barley and buckwheat. It is also among the largest exporters of maize and sunflower oil, as well as the leading producer of fertiliser.

Various analysts of climate change adaptation foresee large opportunities for Russian agriculture during the rest of the 21st century as arability increases in Siberia, which would lead to both internal and external migration to the region. Owing to its large coastline along three oceans and twelve marginal seas, Russia maintains the world's sixth-largest fishing industry, capturing nearly 5 million tons of fish in 2018. It is home to the world's finest caviar, the beluga, and produces about one-third of all canned fish and some one-fourth of the world's total fresh and frozen fish.

=== Science and technology ===
Russia spent about 1% of its GDP on research and development in 2019, with the world's tenth-highest budget. It also ranked tenth worldwide in the number of scientific publications in 2020, with roughly 1.3 million papers. Since 1904, Nobel Prize were awarded to 26 Soviets and Russians in physics, chemistry, medicine, economy, literature and peace. Russia ranked 60th in the Global Innovation Index in 2025.

Since the times of Nikolay Lobachevsky, who pioneered the non-Euclidean geometry, and Pafnuty Chebyshev, a prominent tutor, Russian mathematicians became among the world's most influential. Dmitry Mendeleev invented the Periodic table, the main framework of modern chemistry. Nine Soviet and Russian mathematicians have been awarded with the Fields Medal. Grigori Perelman was offered the first ever Clay Millennium Prize Problems Award for his final proof of the Poincaré conjecture in 2002, as well as the Fields Medal in 2006.

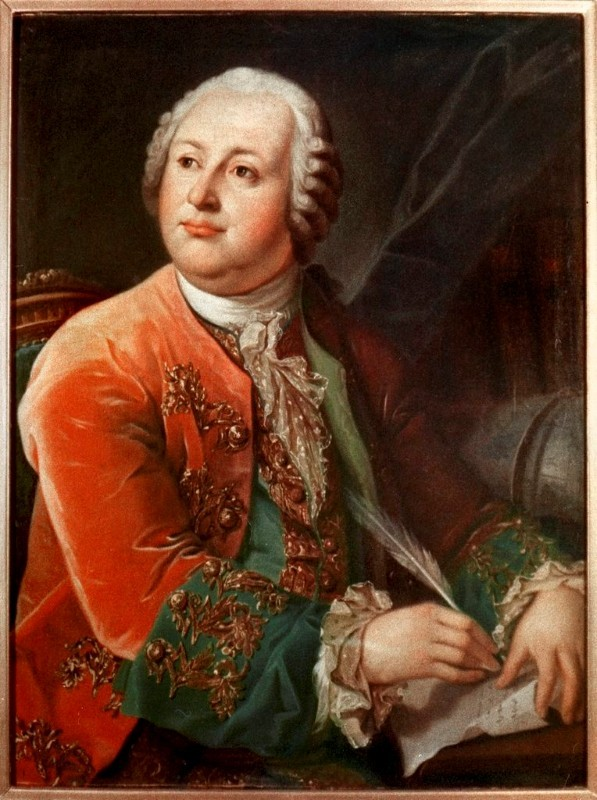
Mikhail Lomonosov (1711–1765), polymath scientist, inventor, poet and artist

Alexander Popov was among the inventors of radio, while Nikolai Basov and Alexander Prokhorov were co-inventors of laser and maser. Oleg Losev made crucial contributions in the field of semiconductor junctions, and discovered light-emitting diodes. Vladimir Vernadsky is considered one of the founders of geochemistry, biogeochemistry, and radiogeology. Élie Metchnikoff is known for his groundbreaking research in immunology. Ivan Pavlov is known chiefly for his work in classical conditioning. Lev Landau made fundamental contributions to many areas of theoretical physics.

Nikolai Vavilov was best known for having identified the centres of origin of cultivated plants. Trofim Lysenko was known mainly for Lysenkoism. Many famous Russian scientists and inventors were émigrés. Igor Sikorsky was an aviation pioneer. Vladimir Zworykin was the inventor of the iconoscope and kinescope television systems. Theodosius Dobzhansky was the central figure in the field of evolutionary biology for his work in shaping the modern synthesis. George Gamow was one of the foremost advocates of the Big Bang theory.

==== Space exploration ====
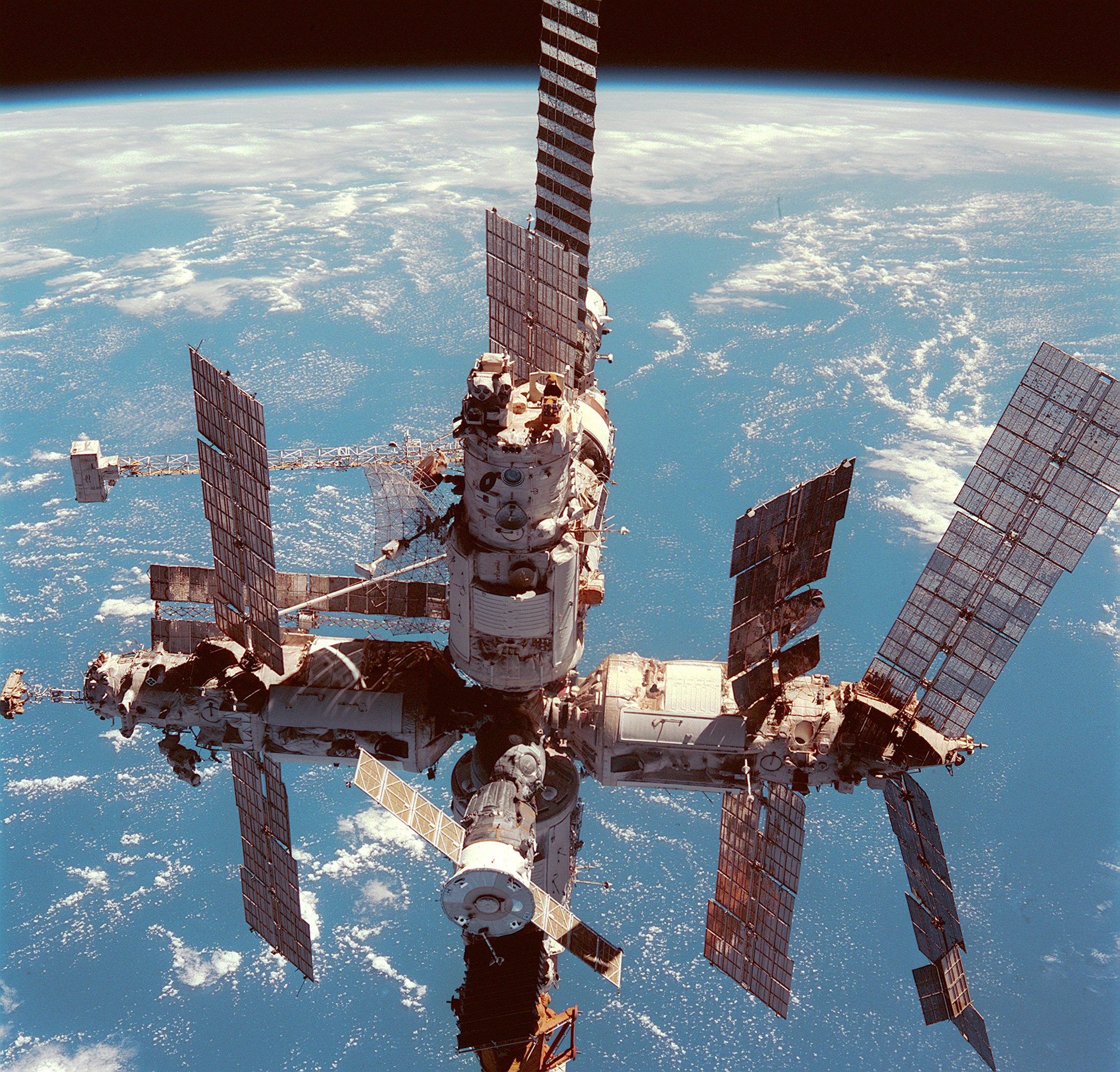
Mir, Russian space station that operated in LEO

Roscosmos is Russia's national space agency. The country's achievements in the field of space technology and space exploration can be traced back to Konstantin Tsiolkovsky, the father of theoretical astronautics, whose works had inspired leading Soviet rocket engineers, such as Sergey Korolyov, Valentin Glushko, and many others who contributed to the success of the Soviet space programme in the early stages of the Space Race and beyond.

In 1957, the first Earth-orbiting artificial satellite, Sputnik 1, was launched. In 1961, the first human trip into space was successfully made by Yuri Gagarin. Many other Soviet and Russian space exploration records ensued. In 1963, Valentina Tereshkova became the first and youngest woman in space, having flown a solo mission on Vostok 6. In 1965, Alexei Leonov became the first human to conduct a spacewalk, exiting the space capsule during Voskhod 2.

In 1957, Laika, a Soviet space dog, became the first animal to orbit the Earth, aboard Sputnik 2. In 1966, Luna 9 became the first spacecraft to achieve a survivable landing on a celestial body, the Moon. In 1968, Zond 5 brought the first Earthlings (two tortoises and other life forms) to circumnavigate the Moon. In 1970, Venera 7 became the first spacecraft to land on another planet, Venus. In 1971, Mars 3 became the first spacecraft to land on Mars. During the same period, Lunokhod 1 became the first space exploration rover, while Salyut 1 became the world's first space station.

As of 2023, Russia has 181 active satellites in space, which is the third-highest in the world. Between the final flight of the Space Shuttle programme in 2011 and the 2020 SpaceX's first crewed mission, Soyuz rockets were the only launch vehicles capable of transporting astronauts to the ISS. Luna 25 launched in August 2023, was the first of the Luna-Glob Moon exploration programme.

=== Tourism ===
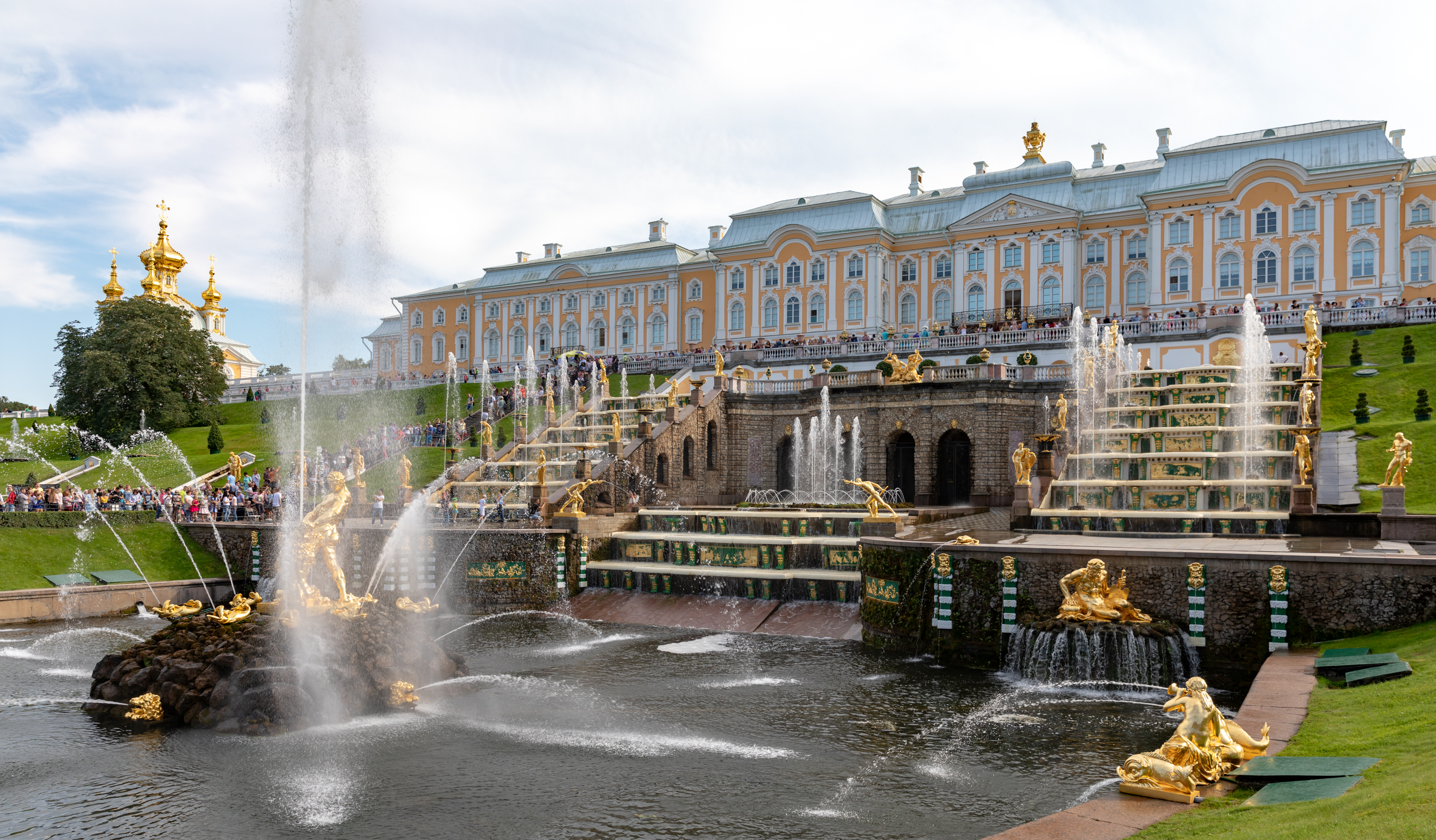
Peterhof Palace in Saint Petersburg, a UNESCO World Heritage Site

Most foreign tourists come from China. Major tourist routes in Russia include a journey around the Golden Ring of Russia, a theme route of ancient Russian cities; cruises on large rivers such as the Volga; hikes on mountain ranges such as the Caucasus Mountains, and journeys on the famous Trans-Siberian Railway. Russia's most visited and popular landmarks include Red Square, the Peterhof Palace, the Kazan Kremlin, the Trinity Lavra of St. Sergius and Lake Baikal.

Moscow, the nation's cosmopolitan capital and historic core, is a megacity; it retains classical and Soviet-era architecture while boasting high art, world class ballet, and modern skyscrapers. Saint Petersburg, the imperial capital, is famous for its classical architecture, cathedrals, museums and theatres, white nights, crisscrossing rivers and numerous canals. Russia is famed worldwide for its rich museums, such as the State Russian, the State Hermitage, and the Tretyakov Gallery, and for theatres such as the Bolshoi and the Mariinsky. The Moscow Kremlin and the Saint Basil's Cathedral are among the cultural landmarks of Russia.

== Demographics ==
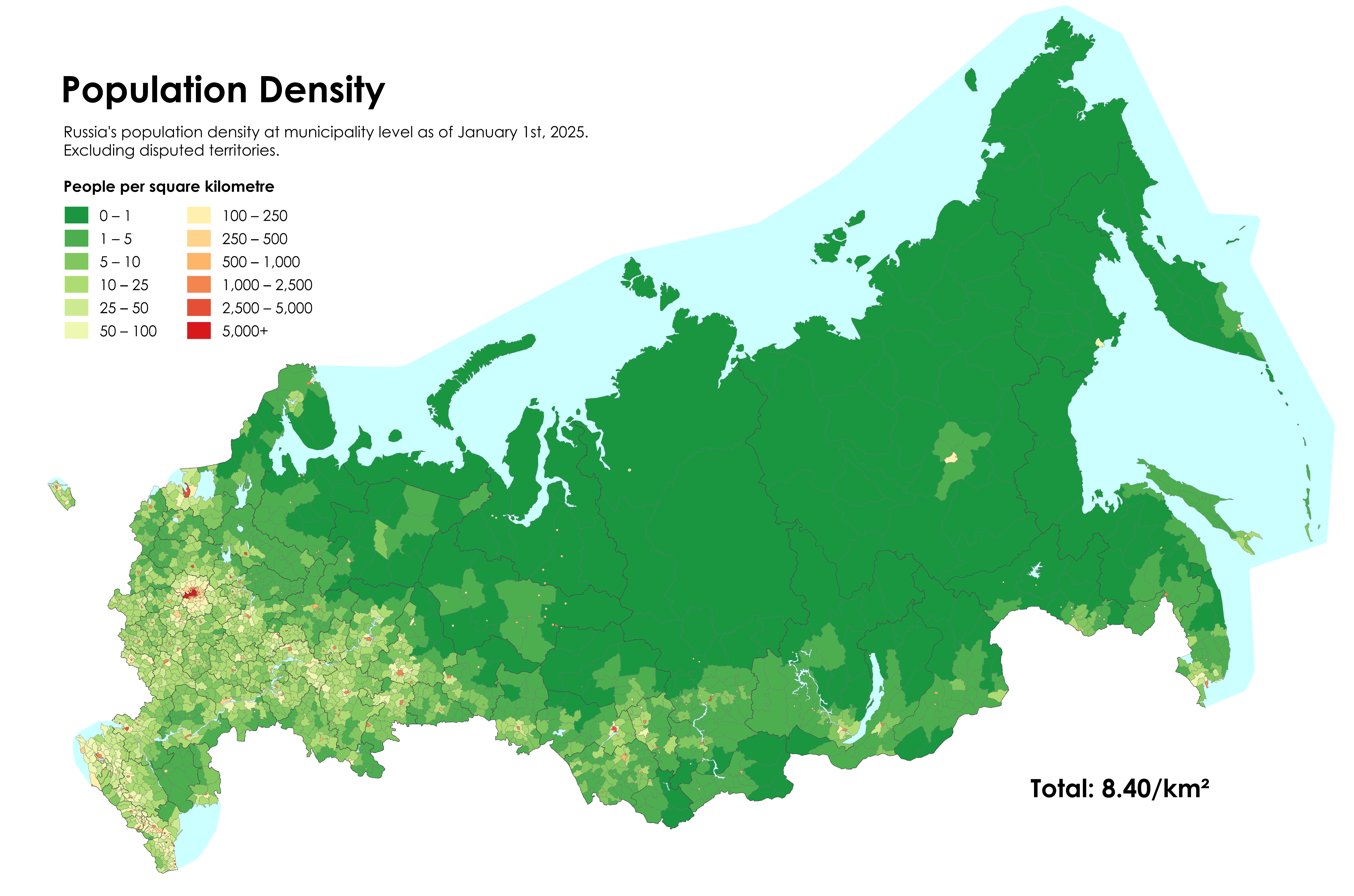
Population density of Russian municipalities according to the 2021 census

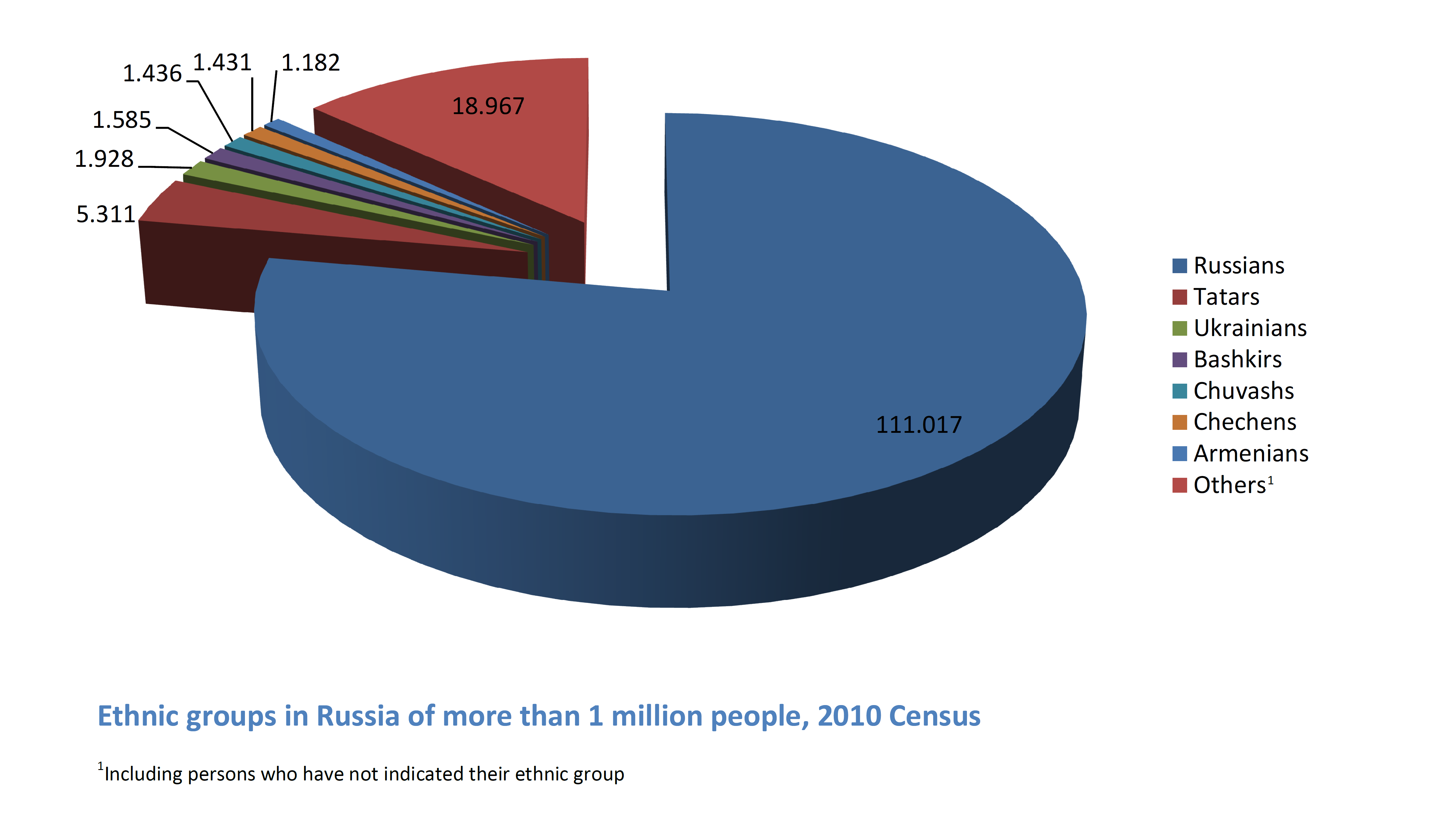
Ethnic groups in Russia with a population of over one million according to the 2010 census

Russia had an estimated population of 146.0 million in 2025 (143.6 million excluding Crimea and Sevastopol), down from 147.2 million in the 2021 census. It is the most populous country in Europe and ninth-most populous country in the world. With a population density of 8.5 inhabitants per square kilometre (22 inhabitants/mi^{2}), Russia is one of the world's most sparsely populated countries, with the vast majority of its people concentrated within its western part. The country is highly urbanised, with three-fourths of the population living in urban areas. As of 2025, the total fertility rate across Russia is estimated to be 1.36 children born per woman, which is below the replacement rate of 2.1 and among the lowest in the world. Consequently, it has one of the oldest populations in the world, with a median age of 41.9 years.

Russia's population peaked at over 148 million in 1993, and subsequently declined due to its death rate exceeding its birth rate, which some analysts have called a demographic crisis. In 2009, it recorded annual population growth for the first time in fifteen years, and subsequently experienced annual population growth due to declining death rates, increased birth rates, and increased immigration. However, these population gains have been reversed since 2020, as excessive deaths from the COVID-19 pandemic resulted in the largest peacetime decline in its history. Following the 2022 Russian invasion of Ukraine, the demographic crisis has deepened, owing to high military fatalities and renewed emigration.

Russia is a multinational state with many subnational entities associated with different minorities. There are over 193 ethnic groups nationwide. In the 2010 census, roughly 81% of the population were ethnic Russians, and the remaining 19% of the population were ethnic minorities. Over four-fifths of Russia's population was of European descent—of whom the vast majority were Slavs, with a substantial minority of Finno-Ugric and Germanic peoples. Russia has the third-largest immigrant population in the world, with over 12 million immigrants residing in the country as of 2019. The vast majority of the immigrants hail from post-Soviet states, with about half of them being from Ukraine and Kazakhstan as of 2020.

Largest cities or towns in Russia 2025 estimate
Rank	Name	Federal subject	Pop.	Rank	Name	Federal subject	Pop.
1	Moscow	Moscow	13,274,285	11	Samara	Samara Oblast	1,154,223
2	Saint Petersburg	Saint Petersburg	5,652,922	12	Rostov-on-Don	Rostov Oblast	1,143,123
3	Novosibirsk	Novosibirsk Oblast	1,637,266	13	Omsk	Omsk Oblast	1,101,367
4	Yekaterinburg	Sverdlovsk Oblast	1,548,187	14	Voronezh	Voronezh Oblast	1,041,722
5	Kazan	Tatarstan	1,329,825	15	Perm	Perm Krai	1,027,518
6	Krasnoyarsk	Krasnoyarsk Krai	1,211,756	16	Volgograd	Volgograd Oblast	1,012,219
7	Nizhny Novgorod	Nizhny Novgorod Oblast	1,198,245	17	Saratov	Saratov Oblast	886,165
8	Chelyabinsk	Chelyabinsk Oblast	1,176,770	18	Tyumen	Tyumen Oblast	872,077
9	Ufa	Bashkortostan	1,166,098	19	Tolyatti	Samara Oblast	662,683
10	Krasnodar	Krasnodar Krai	1,154,885	20	Makhachkala	Dagestan	625,322

=== Language ===
Minority languages across Russia

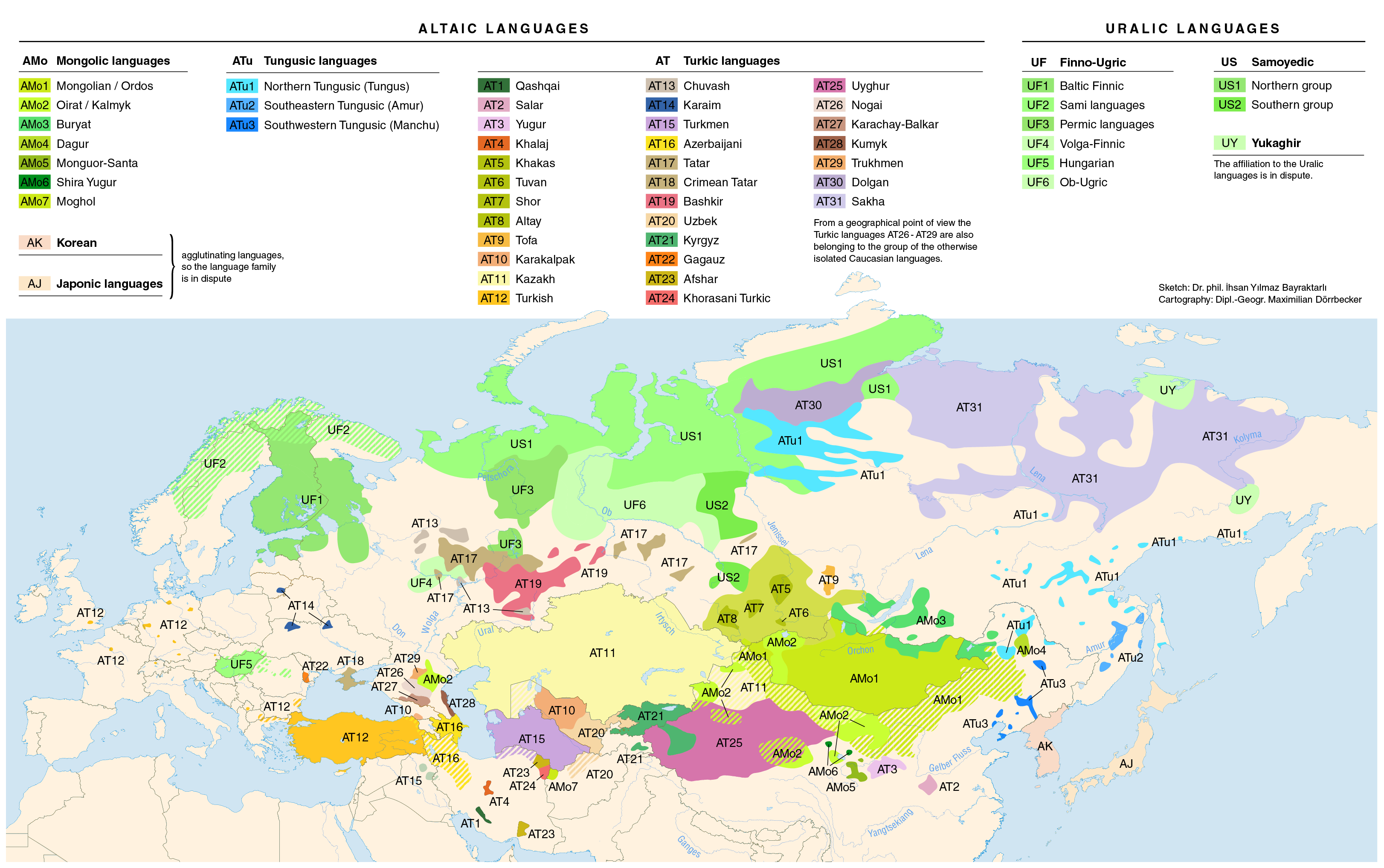
Altaic and Uralic languages spoken across Russia

The North Caucasus is ethno-linguistically diverse.

Russian is the official and the predominantly spoken language in Russia. It is the most spoken native language in Europe, the most geographically widespread language of Eurasia, as well as the world's most widely spoken Slavic language. Russian is one of two official languages aboard the International Space Station, as well as one of the six official languages of the United Nations.

Russia is a multilingual nation: approximately 100–150 minority languages are spoken across the country. According to the Russian Census of 2010, 137.5 million across the country spoke Russian, 3.1 million spoke Tatar, and 1.1 million spoke Ukrainian. The constitution gives the country's individual republics the right to establish their own state languages in addition to Russian, as well as guarantee its citizens the right to preserve their native language and to create conditions for its study and development. However, various experts have claimed Russia's linguistic diversity is rapidly declining due to many languages becoming endangered.

=== Religion ===
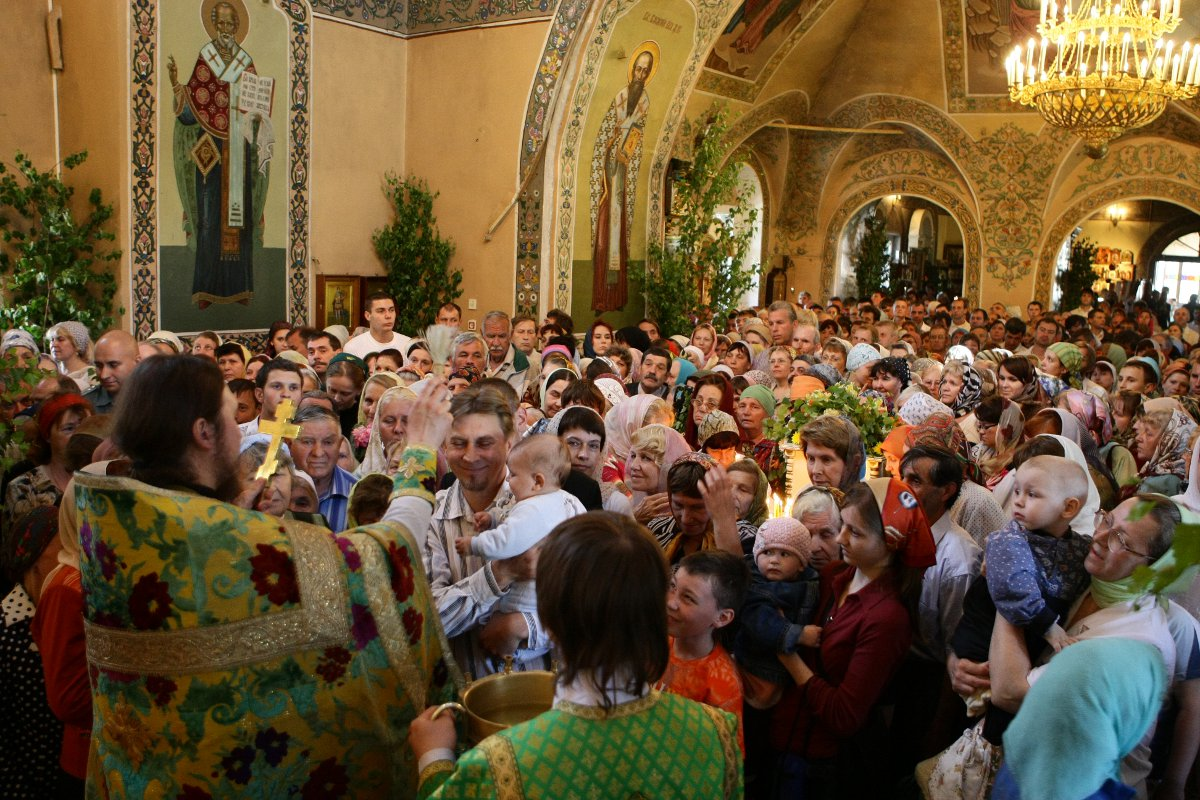
Trinity Sunday in Russia; the Russian Orthodox Church has experienced a great revival since the dissolution of the Soviet Union, a country that had a policy of state atheism.

Russia is constitutionally a secular state that officially enshrines freedom of religion. The largest religion is Eastern Orthodox Christianity, chiefly represented by the Russian Orthodox Church, which is legally recognised for its "special role" in the country's "history and the formation and development of its spirituality and culture." Christianity, Islam, Judaism, and Buddhism are recognised by Russian law as the "traditional" religions of the country constituting its "historical heritage".

Islam is the second-largest religion in Russia and is traditional among the majority of peoples in the North Caucasus and some Turkic peoples in the Volga-Ural region. Large populations of Buddhists are found in Kalmykia, Buryatia, Zabaykalsky Krai, and they are the vast majority of the population in Tuva. A negligible population practices other religions—such as Rodnovery (Slavic Neopaganism), Assianism (Scythian Neopaganism), other ethnic Paganisms, and inter-Pagan movements such as Ringing Cedars' Anastasianism, various movements of Hinduism, Siberian shamanism and Tengrism, various Neo-Theosophical movements such as Roerichism—among other faiths. Some religious minorities have faced oppression and some have been banned in the country: notably, in 2017 the Jehovah's Witnesses were outlawed in Russia, facing persecution ever since, after having been declared an "extremist" and "nontraditional" faith.

In 2012, the research organisation Sreda, in cooperation with the Ministry of Justice, published the Arena Atlas, an adjunct to the 2010 census, enumerating in detail the religious populations and nationalities of Russia, based on a large-sample country-wide survey. The results showed that 47.3% of Russians declared themselves Christians—including 41% Russian Orthodox, 1.5% simply Orthodox or members of non-Russian Orthodox churches, 4.1% unaffiliated Christians, and less than 1% Old Believers, Catholics or Protestants—25% were believers without affiliation to any specific religion, 13% were atheists, 6.5% were Muslims, (Note: The Sreda Arena Atlas 2012 did not count the populations of two federal subjects of Russia where the majority of the population is Muslim, namely Chechnya and Ingushetia, which together had a population of nearly 2 million, thus the proportion of Muslims was possibly slightly underestimated.) 1.2% were followers of "traditional religions honouring gods and ancestors" (Rodnovery, other Paganisms, Siberian shamanism and Tengrism), 0.5% were Buddhists, 0.1% were religious Jews and 0.1% were Hindus.

=== Education ===
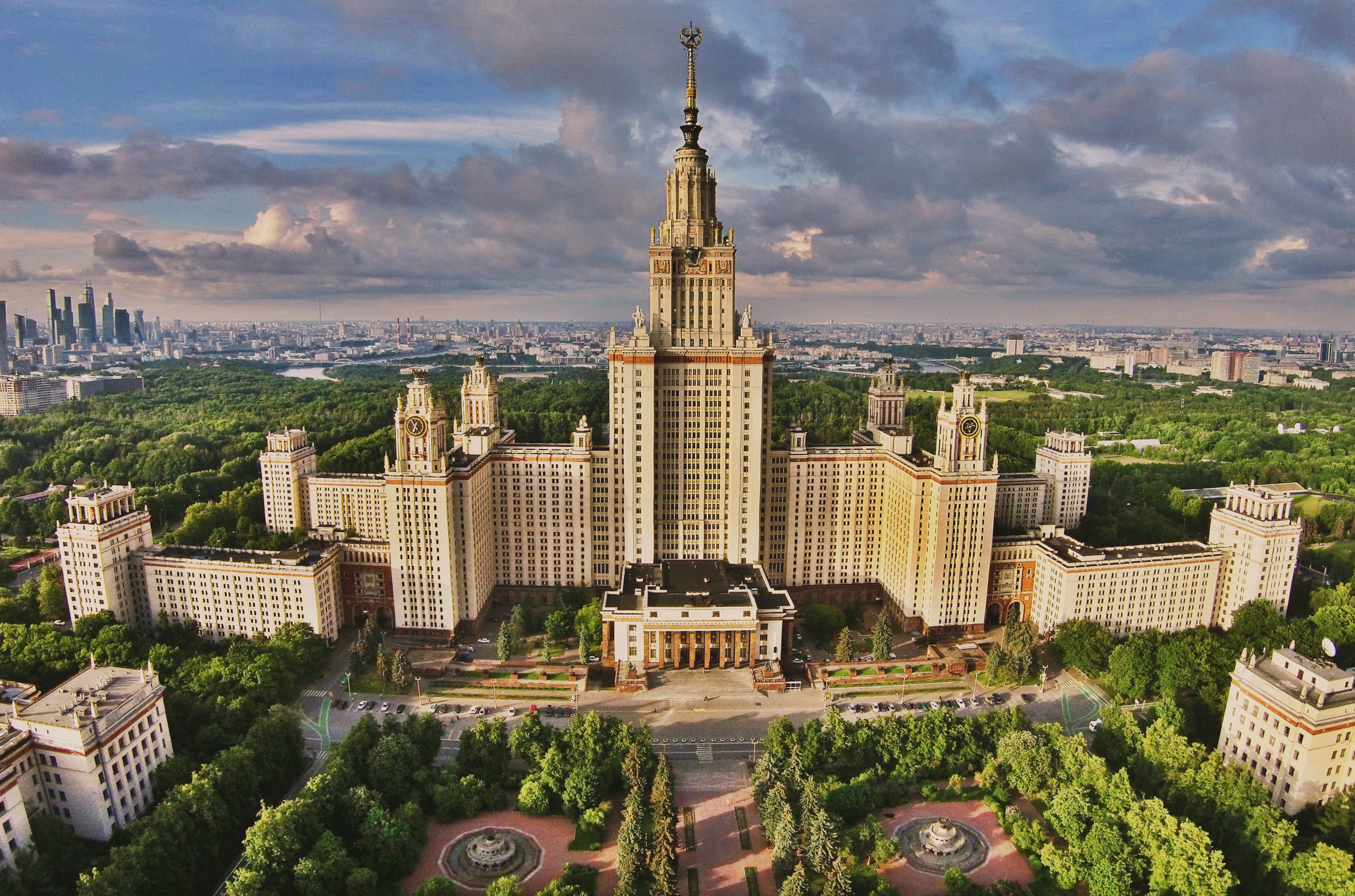
Moscow State University, the most prestigious educational institution in Russia

Russia has a universal adult literacy rate, and education is compulsory for the 11 years from age 7 to 17–18. It grants free education to its citizens by constitution. The Ministry of Education is responsible for primary and secondary education, as well as vocational education, and there is a Ministry of Science and Higher Education. Regional authorities regulate education within their jurisdictions within the prevailing framework of federal laws. As of 2021, over 41% of the Russian population has a bachelor's degree or an equivalent—which is among the highest percentages of tertiary-level graduates in the world.

Russia's pre-school education system is highly developed and optional, some four-fifths of children aged 3 to 6 attend day nurseries or kindergartens. Primary school is compulsory for eleven years, starting from age 6 to 7, and leads to a basic general education certificate. An additional two or three years of schooling are required for the secondary-level certificate, and some seven-eighths of Russians continue their education past this level.

Admission to an institute of higher education is selective and highly competitive: first-degree courses usually take five years. The oldest and largest universities in Russia are Moscow State University and Saint Petersburg State University. There are ten federal universities across the country.

=== Health ===
Russia constitutionally guarantees free, universal health care for all Russian citizens through the mandatory medical insurance (OMS) funded by the Federal Compulsory Medical Insurance Fund (FFOMS) created in 1993. The Ministry of Health of the Russian Federation oversees national healthcare. Its healthcare system has decentralized since the 1990s, with federal entities having local healthcare departments, shifting from the centralized and hierarchical Soviet system. Private healthcare has also seen development, created out of the public healthcare fund.

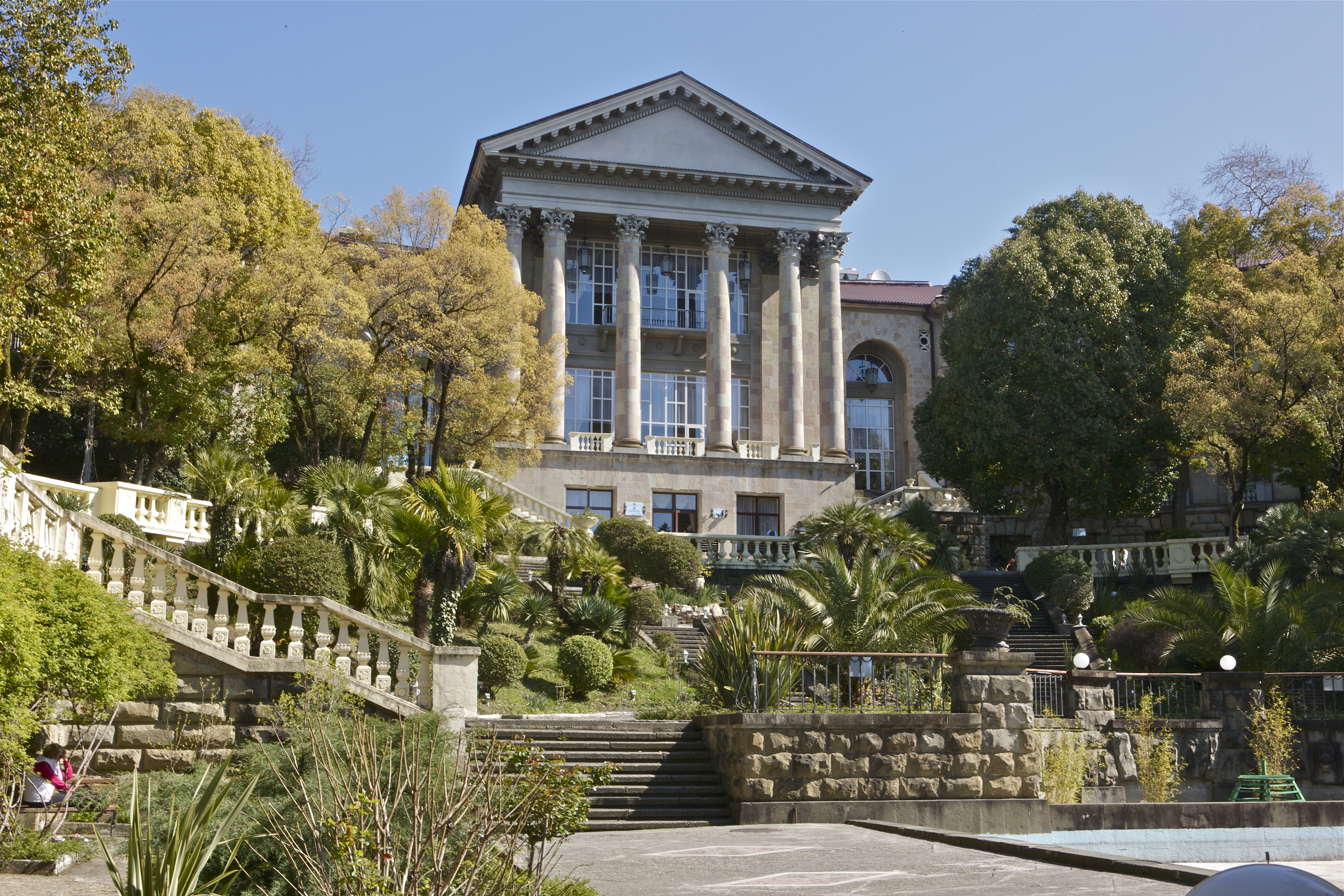
Metallurg, a Soviet-era sanatorium in Sochi

Russia spent 7.39% of its GDP on healthcare in 2021. Its healthcare expenditure is notably lower than other developed nations. As of 2023, the overall life expectancy in Russia at birth is 73 years, an increase of roughly 8 years from 2005. Russia has among the highest gender gaps in life expectancy—78 for females and 68 for males—a gap of 10 years. It has one of the most female-biased sex ratios in the world, with 0.859 males to every female, due to its high male mortality rate. Russia's infant mortality rate is very low (4 per 1,000 live births).

Cardiovascular diseases account for more than half of the yearly mortalities in Russia, which is one of the highest percentages in the world. Its alcohol consumption rate was historically seen as the biggest health issue, but has seen a stark decrease since 2008 due to restrictive government measures. Obesity is a prevalent health issue, with most adults being overweight or obese, alongside smoking—Russia's tobacco consumption rate is among the highest in the world. The country's high suicide rate also remains a significant social issue.

== Culture ==
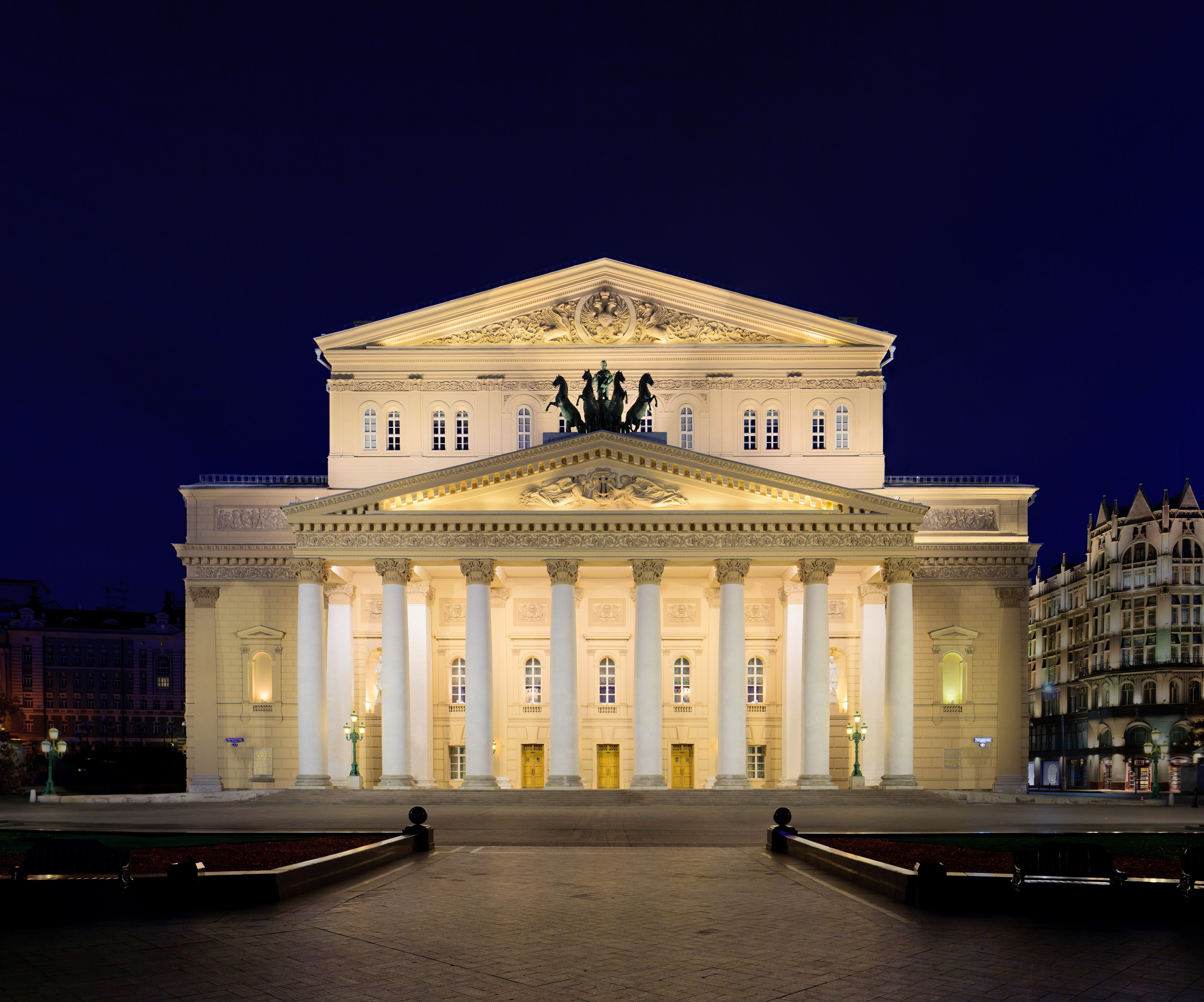
The Bolshoi Theatre in Moscow

Russian culture reflects a long, gradual, and complex amalgamation of various elements that coincided with centuries of development, expansion, and interaction with different peoples, artistic movements, and cultures. Russia has heavily influenced classical music, ballet, theatre, mathematics, sport, painting, and cinema. Russian writers and philosophers have played an important role in the development of European literature and thought. Russia also made pioneering contributions to science, technology, and space exploration.

Russia is home to 32 UNESCO World Heritage Sites, 21 of which are cultural, while 31 lie on the tentative list. The large global Russian diaspora has also played a major role in spreading Russian culture throughout the world. Russia's national symbol, the double-headed eagle, dates back to the Tsardom period and is featured in its coat of arms and heraldry. The Russian Bear and Mother Russia are often used as national personifications of the country. Matryoshka dolls are a cultural icon of Russia.

=== Holidays ===
Russia has eight official holidays spanning public, patriotic, and religious commemorations. The year starts with New Year's Day on 1 January, soon followed by Russian Orthodox Christmas on 7 January; the two are the country's most popular holidays. Defender of the Fatherland Day, dedicated to men, is celebrated on 23 February. International Women's Day on 8 March, gained momentum in Russia during the Soviet era. The annual celebration of women has become so popular, especially among Russian men, that the flower vendors of Moscow often see profits "fifteen times" more compared to other holidays. Spring and Labour Day, originally a Soviet era holiday dedicated to workers, is celebrated on 1 May.

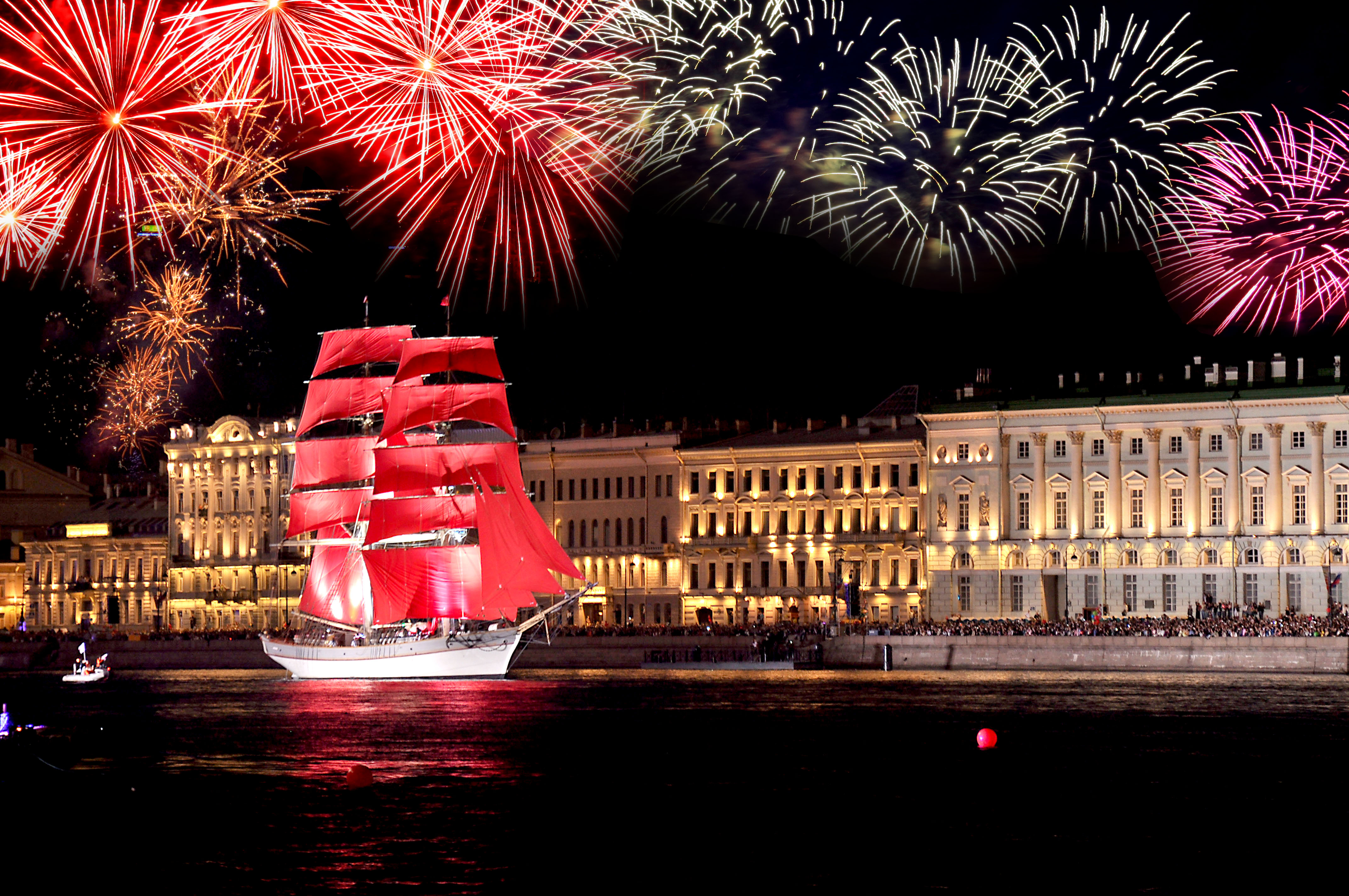
The Scarlet Sails being celebrated along the Neva in Saint Petersburg

Victory Day, which honours Soviet victory over Nazi Germany and the End of World War II in Europe, is celebrated on 9 May as an annual large parade in Moscow's Red Square and marks the famous Immortal Regiment civil event. Other patriotic holidays include Russia Day on 12 June, celebrated to commemorate Russia's declaration of sovereignty from the collapsing Soviet Union, and Unity Day on 4 November, commemorating the 1612 uprising that marked the end of the Polish occupation of Moscow.

There are many popular non-public holidays. Old New Year is celebrated on 14 January. Maslenitsa is an ancient and popular East Slavic folk holiday. Cosmonautics Day on 12 April, in tribute to the first human trip into space. Two major Christian holidays are Easter and Trinity Sunday.

=== Art and architecture ===
Early Russian painting is represented in icons and vibrant frescos. In the early 15th century, master icon painter Andrei Rublev created some of Russia's most treasured religious art. The Russian Academy of Arts, which was established in 1757 to train Russian artists, brought Western techniques of secular painting to Russia. In the 18th century, academicians Ivan Argunov, Dmitry Levitzky, Vladimir Borovikovsky became influential. The early 19th century saw many prominent paintings by Karl Briullov and Alexander Ivanov, both of whom were known for Romantic historical canvases. Ivan Aivazovsky, another Romantic painter, is considered one of the greatest masters of marine art.

Karl Bryullov, The Last Day of Pompeii (1833)

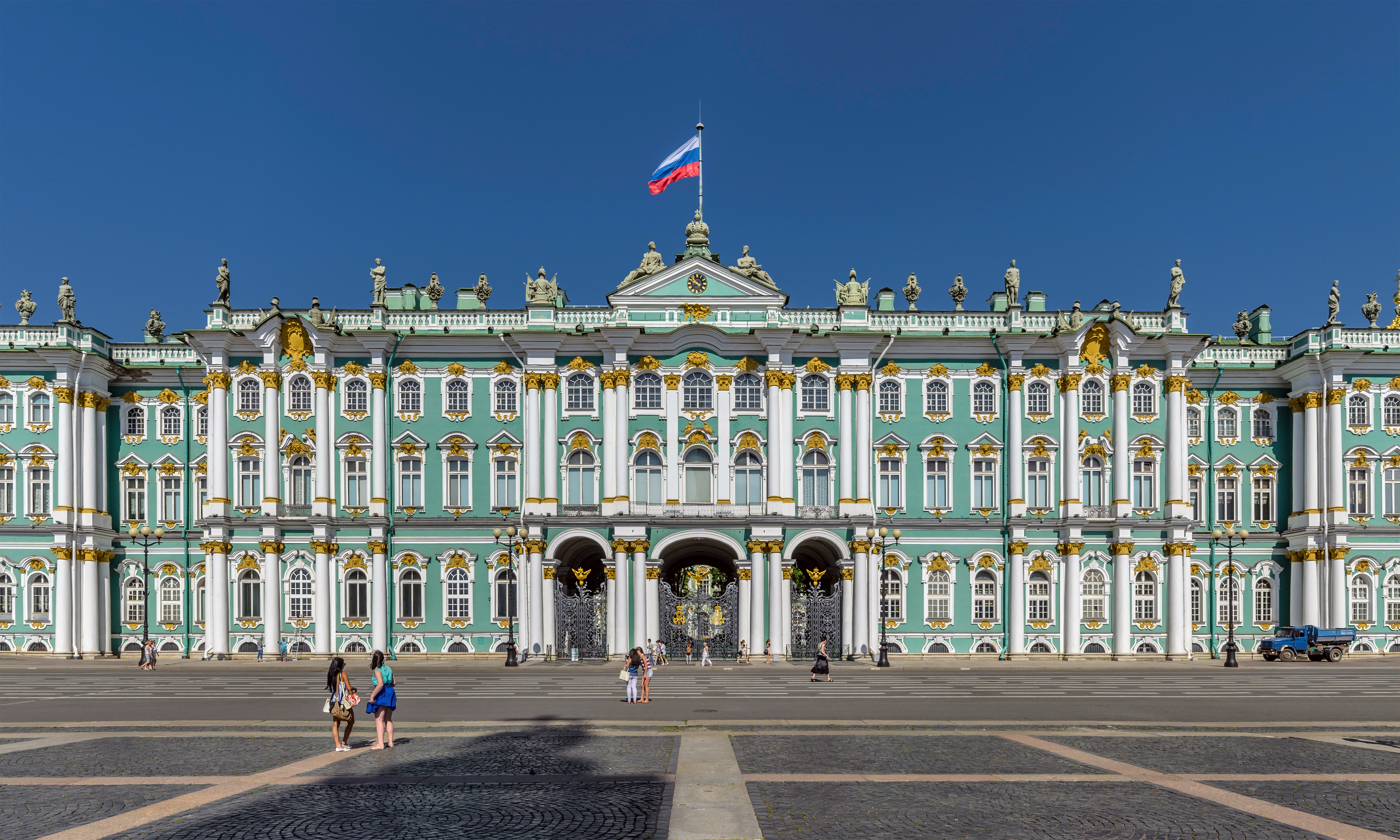
The Winter Palace served as the official residence of the Emperor of Russia.

In the 1860s, a group of critical realists (Peredvizhniki), led by Ivan Kramskoy, Ilya Repin and Vasiliy Perov broke with the academy, and portrayed the many-sided aspects of social life in paintings. The turn of the 20th century saw the rise of symbolism, represented by Mikhail Vrubel and Nicholas Roerich. The Russian avant-garde flourished from approximately 1890 to 1930; globally influential artists from this era were El Lissitzky, Kazimir Malevich, Natalia Goncharova, Wassily Kandinsky, and Marc Chagall.

The history of Russian architecture begins with early woodcraft buildings of ancient Slavs and the church architecture of Kievan Rus'. The Christianization of Kievan Rus' brought centuries Byzantine architecture. Following Mongol occupation, Kievan Rus' cut its ties with the Byzantine Empire, and Russian architecture saw native innovations, such as the invention of the iconostasis. Aristotle Fioravanti and other Italian architects brought Renaissance trends to the Grand Principality of Moscow, which influenced the reconstruction of the Moscow Kremlin. The 16th century saw the development of the unique tent-like churches and the onion dome design, which is a distinctive feature of Russian architecture. In the 17th century, the "fiery style" of ornamentation flourished in Moscow and Yaroslavl, gradually paving the way for the Naryshkin baroque of the 1680s.

After the reforms of Peter the Great, Russia's architecture became influenced by Western European styles. The 18th-century taste for Rococo architecture led to the works of Bartolomeo Rastrelli and his followers. The most influential Russian architects of the eighteenth century, Vasily Bazhenov, Matvey Kazakov, and Ivan Starov, created lasting monuments in Moscow and Saint Petersburg and established a base for the more Russian forms that followed. During the reign of Catherine the Great, Saint Petersburg was transformed into an outdoor museum of Neoclassical architecture. Under Alexander I, Empire style became the de facto architectural style. The second half of the 19th century was dominated by the Neo-Byzantine and Russian Revival style. In the early 20th century, Russian neoclassical revival became a trend. Prevalent styles of the late 20th century were Art Nouveau, Constructivism, and Socialist Classicism.

=== Music ===
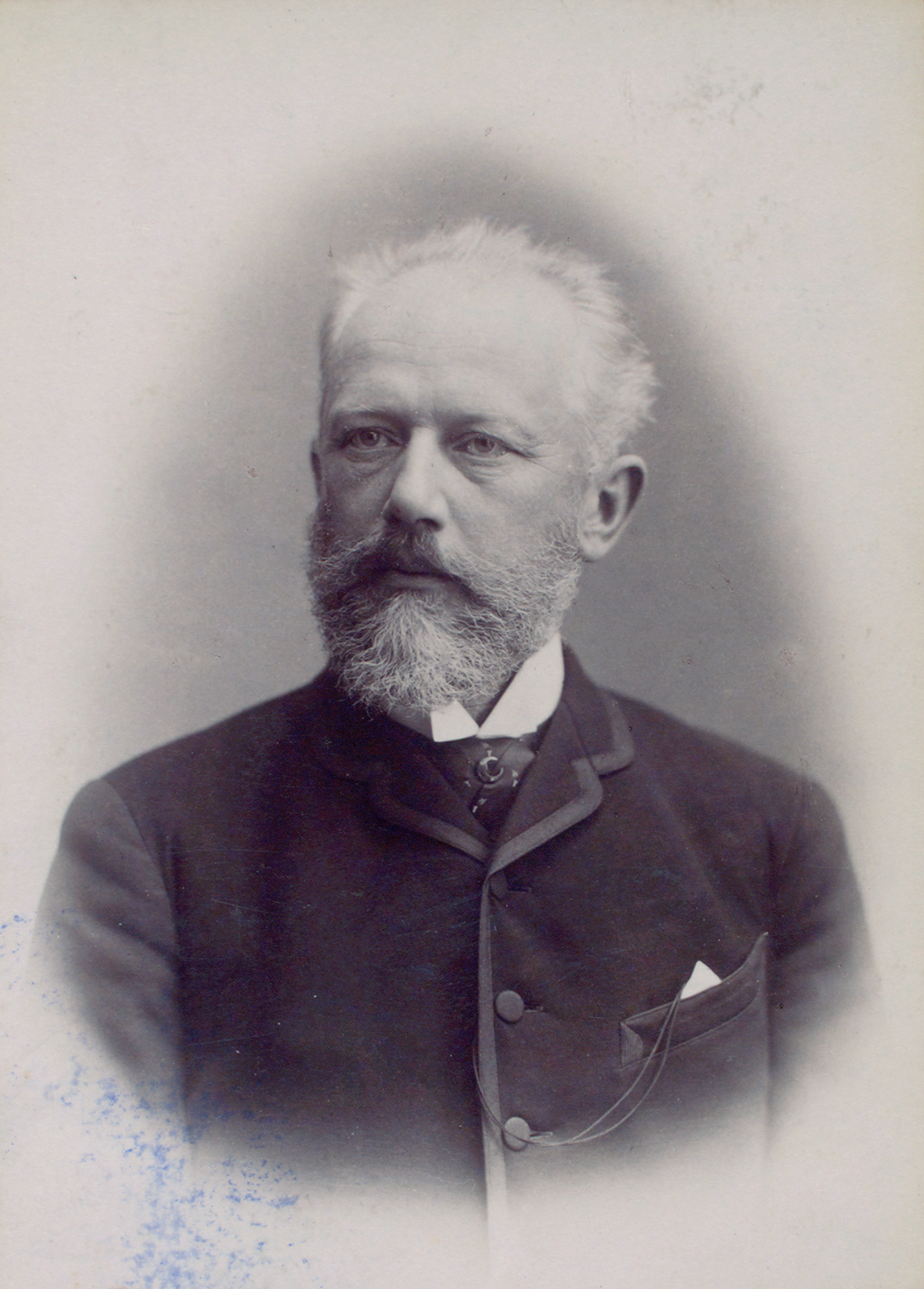
Pyotr Ilyich Tchaikovsky (1840–1893), c. 1888

Until the 18th century, music in Russia consisted mainly of church music and folk songs and dances. In the 19th century, it was defined by the tension between classical composer Mikhail Glinka along with other members of The Mighty Handful, who were later succeeded by the Belyayev circle, and the Russian Musical Society led by composers Anton and Nikolay Rubinstein. The later tradition of Pyotr Ilyich Tchaikovsky, one of the greatest composers of the Romantic era, was continued into the 20th century by Sergei Rachmaninoff. World-renowned composers of the 20th century include Alexander Scriabin, Alexander Glazunov, Igor Stravinsky, Sergei Prokofiev and Dmitri Shostakovich, and later Edison Denisov, Sofia Gubaidulina, Georgy Sviridov, and Alfred Schnittke.

During the Soviet era, popular music also produced a number of renowned figures, such as the two balladeers—Vladimir Vysotsky and Bulat Okudzhava, and performers such as Alla Pugacheva. Jazz, even with sanctions from Soviet authorities, flourished and evolved into one of the country's most popular musical forms. By the 1980s, rock music became popular across Russia, and produced bands such as Aria, Aquarium, DDT, and Kino; the latter's leader Viktor Tsoi, was in particular, a gigantic figure. Pop music has continued to flourish in Russia since the 1960s, with globally famous acts such as t.A.T.u.

=== Literature and philosophy ===
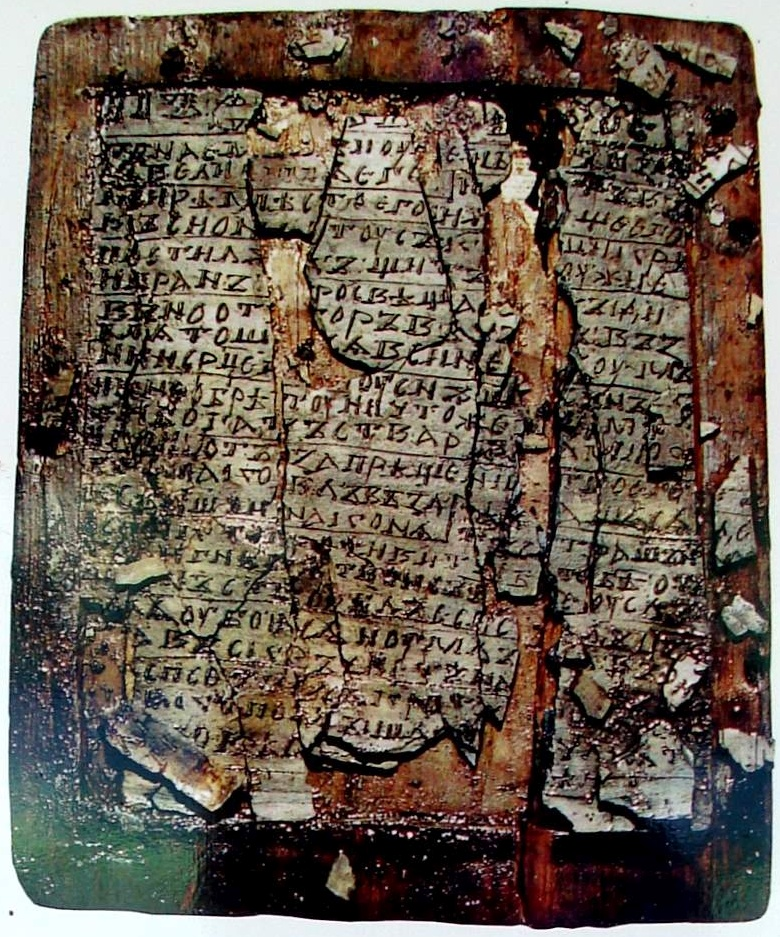
First page of the Novgorod Codex, c. 1000, the oldest surviving book of Kievan Rus'

Russian literature is among the world's most influential and developed. It can be traced to the Early Middle Ages, when Old Church Slavonic was introduced as a liturgical language and came to be used as a literary language, creating a situation of diglossia. The Russian vernacular remained in use for oral literature and chancery writing; it gradually supplanted Church Slavonic in secular works, contributing to the standardisation of the modern Russian literary language in the 18th and early 19th centuries.

By the Age of Enlightenment, literature had grown in importance, with works from Mikhail Lomonosov, Denis Fonvizin, Gavrila Derzhavin, and Nikolay Karamzin. From the early 1830s, during the Golden Age of Russian Poetry, literature underwent an astounding golden age in poetry, prose and drama. Romantic literature permitted a flowering of poetic talent: Vasily Zhukovsky and later his protégé Alexander Pushkin came to the fore. Following Pushkin's footsteps, a new generation of poets were born, including Mikhail Lermontov, Nikolay Nekrasov, Aleksey Konstantinovich Tolstoy, Fyodor Tyutchev, and Afanasy Fet.

The first great Russian novelist was Nikolai Gogol. Then, during the Age of Realism, came Ivan Turgenev, who mastered both short stories and novels. Fyodor Dostoevsky and Leo Tolstoy soon became internationally renowned. Mikhail Saltykov-Shchedrin wrote prose satire, while Nikolai Leskov is best remembered for his shorter fiction. In the second half of the century Anton Chekhov excelled in short stories and became a leading dramatist. Other important 19th-century developments included the fabulist Ivan Krylov, non-fiction writers such as the critic Vissarion Belinsky, and playwrights such as Aleksandr Griboyedov and Aleksandr Ostrovsky. The beginning of the 20th century ranks as the Silver Age of Russian Poetry. This era had poets such as Alexander Blok, Anna Akhmatova, Boris Pasternak, Vladimir Mayakovsky, Sergei Yesenin, and Konstantin Balmont. It also produced some first-rate novelists and short-story writers, such as Aleksandr Kuprin, Nobel Prize winner Ivan Bunin, Leonid Andreyev, Yevgeny Zamyatin, Dmitry Merezhkovsky, and Andrei Bely.

After the Russian Revolution of 1917, Russian literature split into Soviet and white émigré parts. In the 1930s, socialist realism became the predominant trend in Russia. Its leading figure was Maxim Gorky, who laid the foundations of this style. Mikhail Bulgakov was one of the leading writers of the Soviet era. Nikolay Ostrovsky's novel How the Steel Was Tempered has been among the most successful works of Russian literature. Influential émigré writers include Vladimir Nabokov, Joseph Brodsky, and Isaac Asimov, who was considered one of the "Big Three" science fiction writers. Some writers dared to oppose Soviet ideology, such as Nobel Prize-winning novelist Aleksandr Solzhenitsyn, who wrote about life in the Gulag camps, and Andrey Sinyavsky.

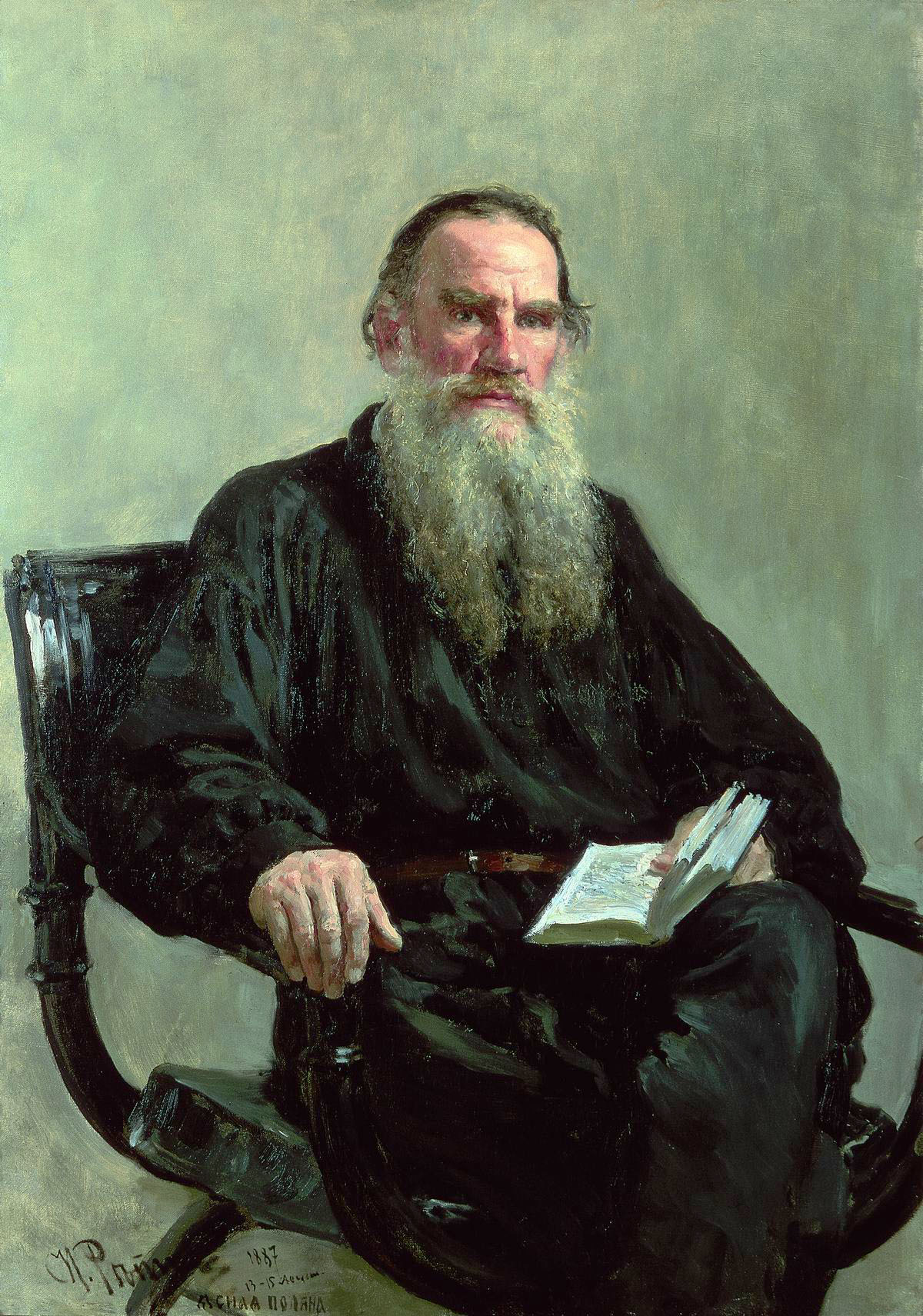
Leo Tolstoy (1828–1910) is widely regarded as one of the greatest authors of all time, with works such as War and Peace.

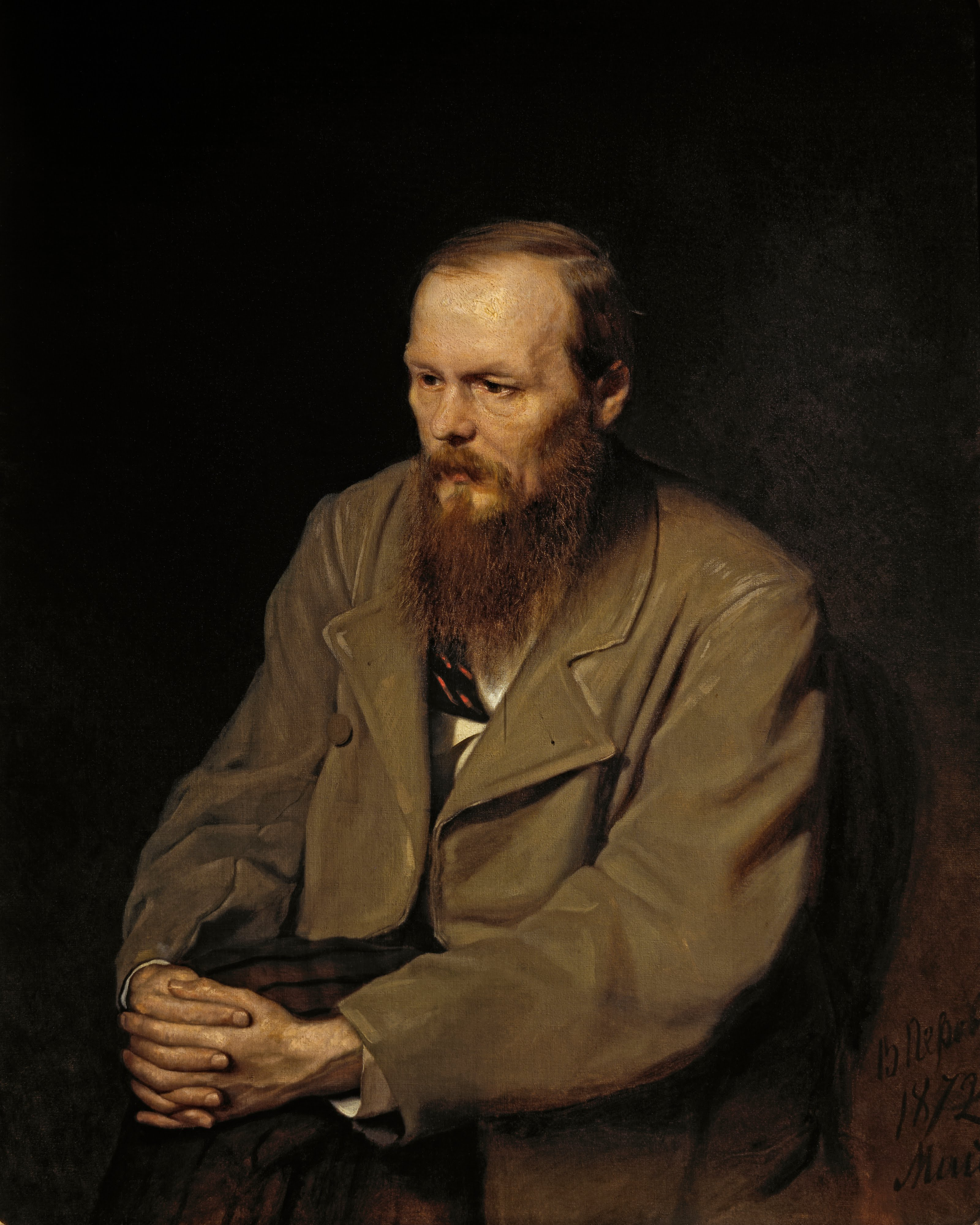
Fyodor Dostoevsky (1821–1881), widely considered one of the greatest novelists of all time, whose works include Crime and Punishment

Russian literature faced rapid and difficult changes during the turbulent 1990s, with writers and publishers struggling to adjust to new economic and political developments. Domestic literature subsequently declined in influence among most Russians, who now had sudden and rapid access to a wide volume of previously suppressed Western literary movements. Nevertheless, this environment fostered experimental and postmodern literature and satire. At the beginning of the 21st century, the most discussed figures, postmodernists Victor Pelevin and Vladimir Sorokin, remained the leading Russian writers.

Russian philosophy has been influential. Religious and spiritual philosophy is represented by Vladimir Solovyov, Nikolai Berdyaev, Pavel Florensky, Semyon Frank, Nikolay Lossky, Vasily Rozanov, and others. Mystic Helena Blavatsky gained an international following as the leading theoretician of Theosophy and the co-founder of the Theosophical Society. Alexander Herzen is known as one of the fathers of agrarian populism. Mikhail Bakunin is referred to as the father of anarchism. Peter Kropotkin was the most important theorist of anarcho-communism. Mikhail Bakhtin's writings have significantly inspired scholars in various fields. Vladimir Lenin, a major revolutionary, developed a variant of communism known as Leninism. Leon Trotsky, Lenin's contemporary and co-revolutionary, founded his own strain of Marxism known as Trotskyism. Alexander Zinoviev was a prominent philosopher and writer in the second half of the 20th century.

=== Mass media and cinema ===
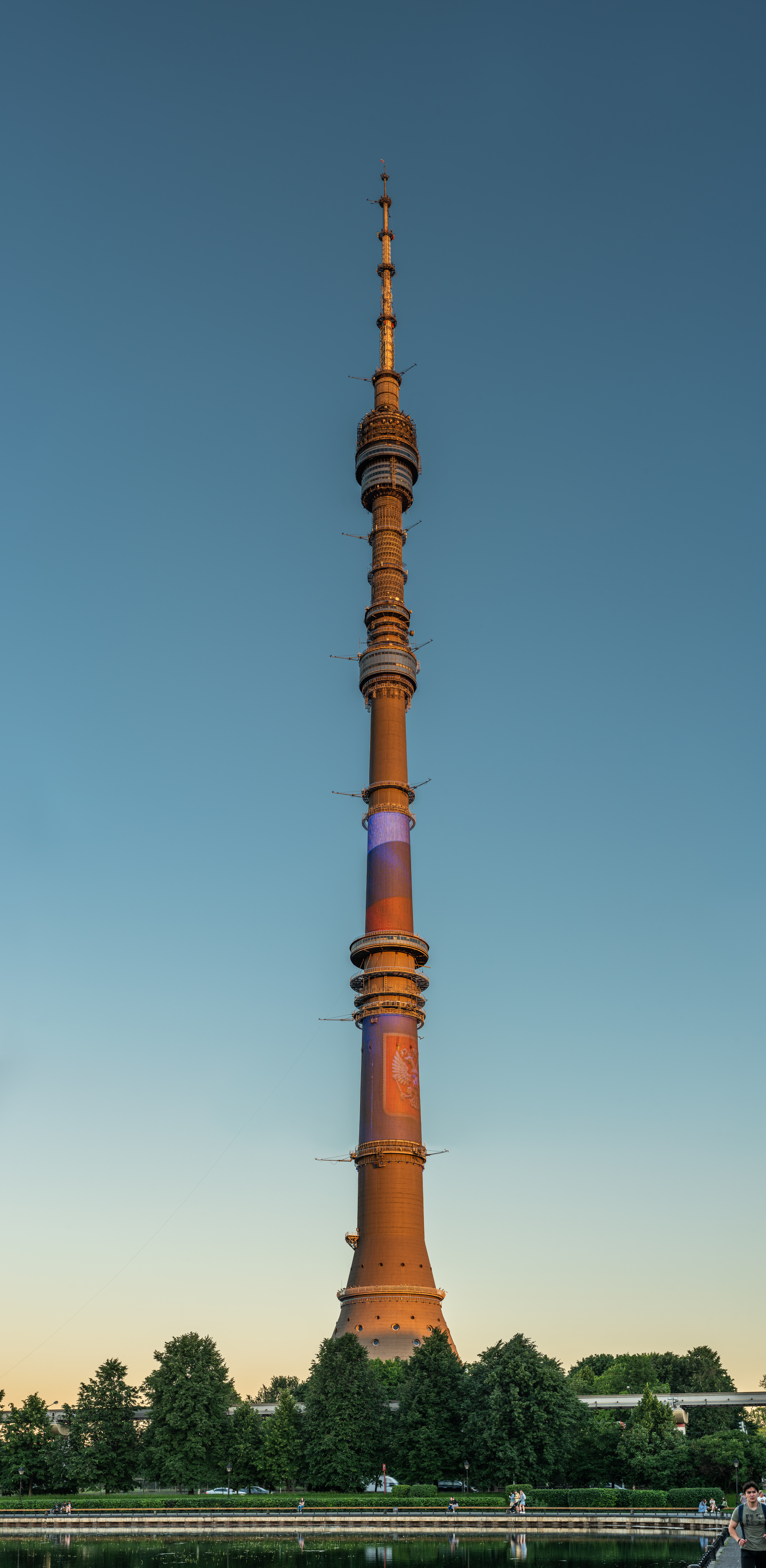
Ostankino Tower in Moscow, the tallest freestanding structure in Europe

There are 400 news agencies in Russia, among which the largest internationally operating are TASS, RIA Novosti, Sputnik, and Interfax. Television is the most popular medium in Russia. Among the 3,000 licensed radio stations nationwide, notable ones include Radio Rossii, Vesti FM, Echo of Moscow, Radio Mayak, and Russkoye Radio. Of the 16,000 registered newspapers, Argumenty i Fakty, Komsomolskaya Pravda, Rossiyskaya Gazeta, Izvestia, and Moskovskij Komsomolets are popular. State-run Channel One and Russia-1 are the leading news channels, while RT is the flagship of Russia's international media operations.

Russian and later Soviet cinema was a hotbed of invention, resulting in world-renowned films such as Battleship Potemkin, which was named the greatest film of all time at the Brussels World's Fair in 1958. Soviet-era filmmakers, most notably Sergei Eisenstein and Andrei Tarkovsky, became two of the world's most innovative and influential directors. Eisenstein was a student of Lev Kuleshov, who developed the groundbreaking Soviet montage theory of film editing at the world's first film school, the All-Union Institute of Cinematography. Dziga Vertov's "Kino-Eye" theory had a large effect on the development of documentary filmmaking and cinema realism. Many Soviet socialist realism films were artistically successful, including Chapaev, The Cranes Are Flying, and Ballad of a Soldier.

The 1960s and 1970s saw a greater variety of artistic styles in Soviet cinema. The comedies of Eldar Ryazanov and Leonid Gaidai were immensely popular, with many of their catchphrases still in use today. In 1961–68 Sergey Bondarchuk directed an Oscar-winning film adaptation of Leo Tolstoy's epic War and Peace, which was the most expensive film made in the Soviet Union. In 1969, Vladimir Motyl's White Sun of the Desert was released, a very popular film in a genre of ostern; the film is traditionally watched by cosmonauts before any trip into space. After the dissolution of the Soviet Union, the Russian cinema industry suffered large losses; however, since the late 2000s, it has seen growth once again, and continues to expand.

=== Cuisine ===
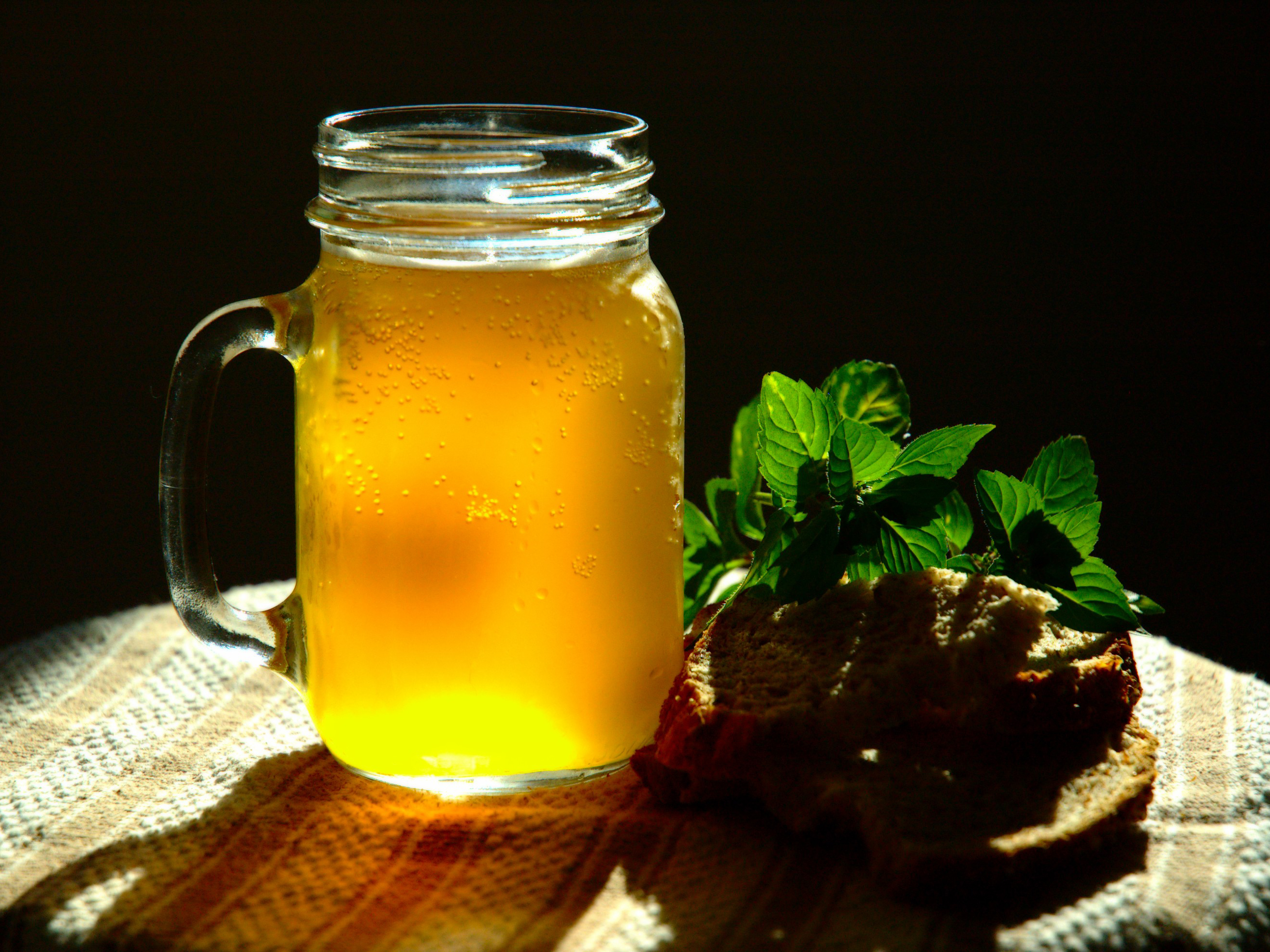
Kvass is an ancient and traditional Russian beverage.

Russian cuisine has been shaped by the country's diverse climate, cultural and religious traditions, and vast geography; it shares similarities with neighbouring countries. Crops of rye, wheat, barley, and millet provide the ingredients for various breads, pancakes and cereals, as well as for many drinks. Bread, of many varieties, is very popular across Russia. Flavourful soups and stews include shchi, borsch, ukha, solyanka, and okroshka. Smetana (a heavy sour cream) and mayonnaise are often added to soups and salads. Pirozhki, blini, and syrniki are native types of pancakes. Beef Stroganoff, Chicken Kiev, pelmeni, and shashlyk are popular meat dishes. Other meat dishes include stuffed cabbage rolls (golubtsy) usually filled with meat. Salads include Olivier salad, vinegret, and dressed herring.

Russia's national non-alcoholic drink is kvass, and the national alcoholic drink is vodka; its production in Russia (and elsewhere) dates back to the 14th century. The country has the world's highest vodka consumption, while beer is the most popular alcoholic beverage. Wine has become increasingly popular in Russia in the 21st century. Tea has been popular in Russia for centuries.

=== Sports ===
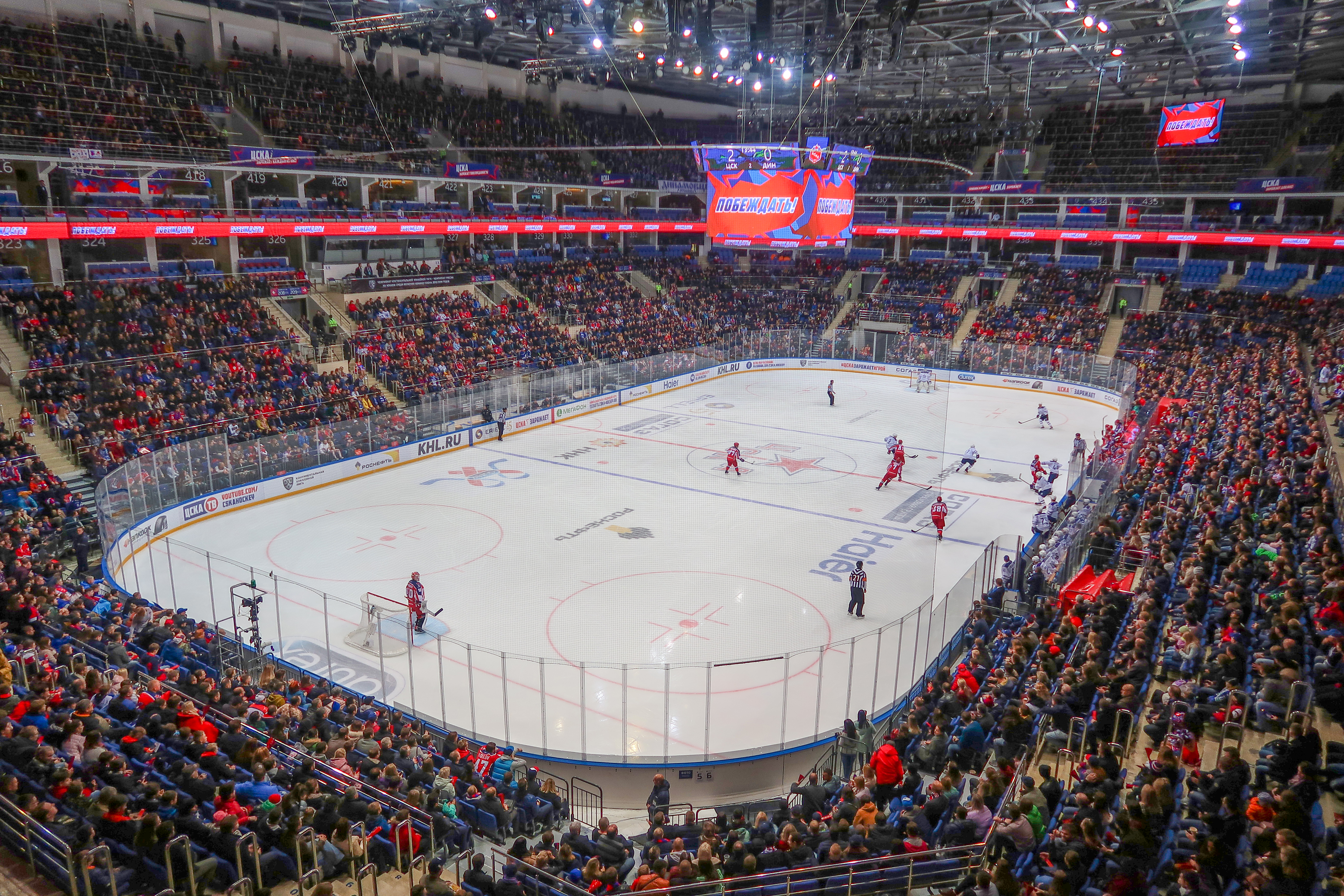
KHL match between CSKA Moscow and Dynamo Moscow at CSKA Arena, Moscow

Football is the most popular sport in Russia. The Soviet Union national football team became the first European champions by winning Euro 1960, and reached the finals of Euro 1988. Russian clubs CSKA Moscow and Zenit Saint Petersburg won the UEFA Cup in 2005 and 2008. The Russian national football team reached the semi-finals of Euro 2008. Russia was the host nation for the 2017 FIFA Confederations Cup, and the 2018 FIFA World Cup. However, Russian teams are currently suspended from FIFA and UEFA competitions.

Ice hockey is very popular in Russia, and the Soviet national ice hockey team dominated the sport internationally throughout its existence. Bandy is Russia's national sport, and it has historically been the highest-achieving country in the sport. The Russian national basketball team won EuroBasket 2007, and the Russian basketball club PBC CSKA Moscow is among the most successful European basketball teams. The annual Formula One Russian Grand Prix was held at the Sochi Autodrom in the Sochi Olympic Park, until its termination following the 2022 Russian invasion of Ukraine.

Historically, Russian athletes have been one of the most successful contenders in the Olympic Games. Russia is the leading nation in rhythmic gymnastics, and Russian synchronised swimming is considered to be the world's best. Figure skating is another popular sport in Russia, especially pair skating and ice dancing. Russia has produced numerous prominent tennis players. Chess is also a widely popular pastime in the nation, with many of the world's top chess players being Russian for decades. The 1980 Summer Olympic Games were held in Moscow, and the 2014 Winter Olympics and the 2014 Winter Paralympics were hosted in Sochi. However, Russia has also had 43 Olympic medals stripped from its athletes due to doping violations, which is the most of any country, and nearly a third of the global total.

== See also ==
- Outline of Russia
