= Personality and reputation of Paul I of Russia =

Character analysis

Paul I of Russia, also known as Tsar Paul, reigned as Emperor of Russia from 1796 to 1801. He succeeded his mother, Catherine the Great, and immediately began a mission to undo her legacy. Paul had deep animosity towards his mother and her actions as empress. He swiftly annulled many of Catherine's decrees, disparaged her memory and tried to elevate the reputation of his father, Peter. Catherine was empathetic toward the Russian nobility. Paul took a different approach; he revoked numerous privileges granted to the nobility, perceiving them as weak, disorganized, and undisciplined. This shift in policy created tensions in the ruling class.

In addition to these cultural changes, Paul implemented extensive reforms in the Russian Imperial Army. He had a strict, regimented leadership style as grand duke, continuously drilling his household troops. As the tsar, he instituted a brutal military regime characterized by constant drilling and harsh punishments for minor infractions. Officers (who could be anonymously reported by lower-ranked soldiers) were subject to summary retribution. Paul occasionally administered beatings himself, and some officers faced exile to Siberia or dismissal from service. Army uniforms were redesigned in the Prussian style, which was criticized as tight-fitting and impractical. Meticulous attention was paid to details such as waxed hair. Paul's sweeping reforms and authoritarian methods alienated various segments of society, ultimately leading to his downfall. He was deposed in a palace coup and assassinated.

Contemporary observers, including his doctors, noted that Paul seemed constantly stressed and prone to anger. These assessments were generally accepted by 19th- and early 20th-century historians; recent scholarship has questioned the validity of diagnosing his mental state two centuries later, however, and the memoirs of earlier historians may not have been impartial. Due to concerns about the legitimacy of subsequent Romanov rulers, debate about Paul's personality was limited until the 20th century. Some scholars say that contemporary diplomatic correspondence provides more reliable insights.

Consensus exists among historians that Paul likely had some form of mental instability or a spectrum disorder, but the extent to which this affected his governance or polity is debated. Although his mental health clearly influenced his actions, modern historians also recognize his positive policies.

== Background ==
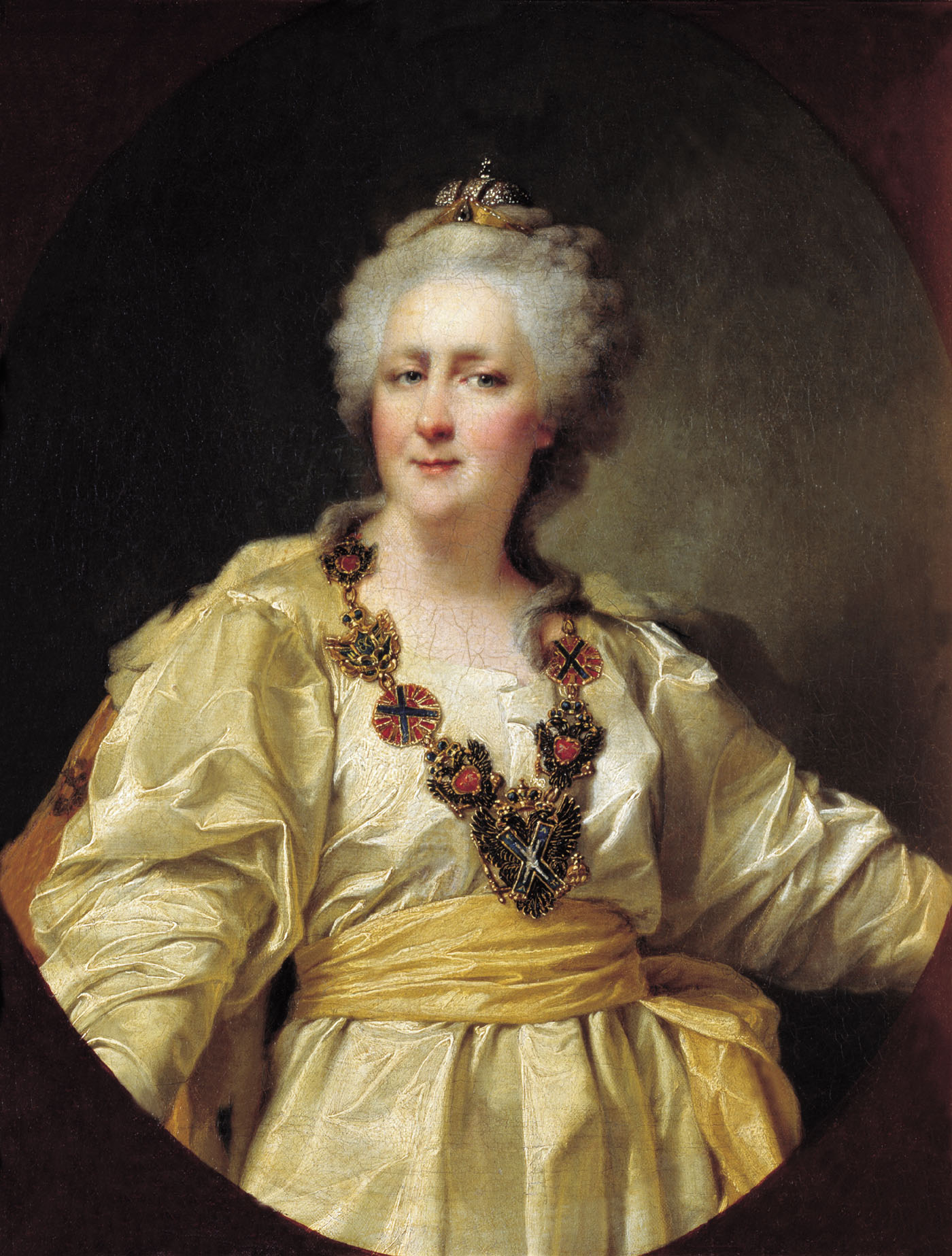
1794 portrait of Catherine the Great by Dmitry Levitzky

Born in 1754, Paul was the son of Emperor Peter III and Catherine the Great. Six months after Peter's accession, Catherine participated in a successful coup d'état against her husband; Peter was deposed and died in prison.

During Catherine's reign, Russia was revitalized. It expanded geographically and economically, increasing its contacts in Western Europe and earning recognition as a great power. The Russian Empire expanded by conquest and diplomacy. The Ottoman Empire was defeated in the Russo-Turkish wars, and Novorossiya on the Black Sea and the Sea of Azov was colonized. The Polish–Lithuanian Commonwealth in the west was partitioned, with the Russian Empire taking the largest portion.

Catherine reformed the administration of Russian governorates. An admirer of Peter the Great, she continued to modernize Russia along Western European lines. The Russian economy and military continued to depend on serfdom, however, and the increasing demands of the state and private landowners intensified the exploitation of serfs. This led to a number of peasant rebellions during Catherine's reign, including the large-scale Pugachev's Rebellion.

Her reign is considered a golden age of Russia. The Manifesto on Freedom of the Nobility, issued during Peter III's reign and confirmed by Catherine, freed Russian nobles from compulsory military or state service. She enthusiastically supported Age of Enlightenment ideals, and has been cited as a benevolent despot. (Note: In this context, "despot" is not a pejorative term but is used by contemporaries such as Voltaire to describe enlightened absolutism. Kenneth L. Campbell writes that the label stemmed from "the support that they offered to education, religious toleration, freedom of the press, and other goals of the Enlightenment. But, in practice, these monarchs were tolerant only up to the point where their rule began to come under criticism. Freedom always came second to obedience in an absolute monarchy".) In 1789, near the end of Catherine's reign, revolution broke out in France and Louis XVI was executed. The revolution sent shock waves through the other European powers, and Catherine rejected many Enlightenment principles she had previously favored.

== Crown prince ==
Paul was expected to be an enlightened constitutionalist who would live up to the martial reputation of his predecessor, Peter the Great. His behavior was reportedly eccentric before his accession, usually taking the form of outbursts of rage. Paul dismissed a platoon because it misplaced an order, and threatened to beat his gardener with a stick. He reached his legal majority in 1772, but did not receive any official offices or positions because of his behavior.

Foreign diplomats also noted Paul's moodiness, and Whitworth wrote about Paul's "acrimony of disposition". Austrian ambassador Louis Cobenzl had worked with Paul and was aware of his propensity for rage: "One absolutely does not know what to count on with the Grand Duke, he changes his language and his sentiments almost every moment". Cobenzl wrote that he had not seen any sign that the prince possessed the necessary leadership qualities, and hoped that he would learn them soon. This, the modern scholar R. E. McGrew writes, "was a very slender hope. Paul was 42-years-old, his personality was firmly set and he had long since decided who his enemies were". The French emissary believed that Paul might have been deranged, and French chargé d'affaires Sabatier de Cabre reported that 14-year-old Paul

... is believed to be vindictive, headstrong and absolute in his ideas. It is only to be feared that by virtue of having his wings clipped, a potentially decided character may be rendered obstinate, that it may be replaced by duplicity, repressed hatred and perhaps pusillanimity, and that the high-mindedness which might have been developed in him may be stifled at last by the terror that his mother has always inspired in him.

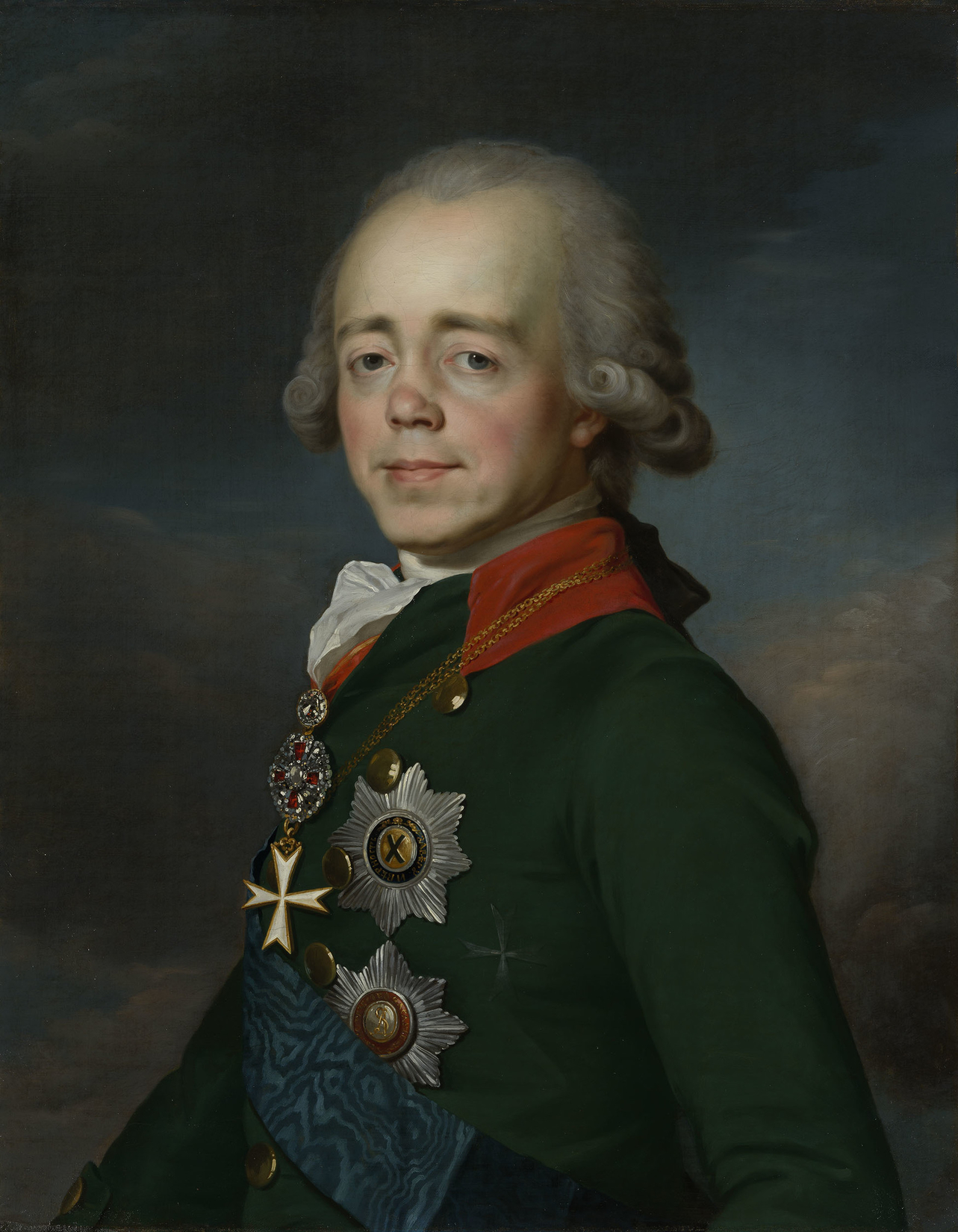
Paul as Grand Duke

McGrew writes that Paul's reputation for disturbing behavior was established in St. Petersburg by 1794 after several incidents at court relating to his pursuit of Yekaterina Nelidova. This affair was the reason Catherine intended to change her heir apparent. The roots of Paul's distrustful nature may be found in his lonely upbringing. Catherine had acceded to the imperial throne following the deposition and murder of her husband, Emperor Peter III, who was officially Paul's father. (Note: Paul was rumoured to have been a by-product of a liaison between Catherine and her chamberlain, Sergei Saltykov, although David Duke says that he was "beyond all reasonable doubt" Peter's son.) Catherine kept Paul sequestered at Gatchina, a rural estate far from St. Petersburg (and power), and probably intended to replace Paul as her heir with his son, Alexander; however, she died before this was legislated. Paul spent most of his time organizing his regiment, parading and punishing them tyrannically. (Note: Rey notes that Paul also helped the local people, building a hospital for the peasants and a school for their children; he also encouraged local industry.)

=== Relationship with his mother ===
Paul's loathing of Catherine may have stemmed from his belief that she was complicit in the overthrow and assassination of his father, Peter III. The revolutionaries of 1762 had originally proposed Paul as the new emperor, with Catherine as regent; this did not suit Catherine's plans, and explains her subsequent near-exile of him to Gatchina. He and Catherine were opposites; historian Jerome Blum believes that Paul had a "pathological hatred" of Catherine, who had "treated him shamefully". B. Dmytryshyn agrees that Paul had an "intense hatred" of his mother.

== Political ideology ==
Paul wanted to reaffirm absolute sovereignty in the face of the French Revolution and defend traditional royal power. His political vision, a combination of paternalism and lawful absolutism, was in his mother's tradition and a common feature of late-18th-century monarchs. Paul's policies were based on two factors: a determination to reverse, mitigate or make a "heroic repudiation" of his mother's policies, and a fearful rejection of the influence of the French Revolution.

Paul's theoretical ideology and enlightened absolutism was, in the Russian context, progressive. Louis XIV, the Maximilien de Béthune, Duke of Sully, Peter the Great and Frederick II were his influences, but "the gap between these generalized intentions and what Paul did is enormous". His breadth of political vision was constrained by his concern for minutiae.

They found that he was often inaccessible. They leave little doubt that he was frustrating and difficult to work with, that he was inclined to sudden and unexpected reactions, that he had a violent temper, and that, in the political sense of the term, he was wholly inexperienced. His style of speaking was sometimes allusive to the point of being incomprehensible, he was no respecter of persons, and he could be vindictive. self-righteous, and often ridiculous. (Note: Although conversely, says McGrew, this was because they did not realize that Paul had a vision of where he wanted Russia to be and how she could be got there, and that, fundamentally, in his view, he was the only man who could do it.) Important memoirs are those of Golovina, Golovkin, Charles Masson (Alexander's private secretary), poet and statesman Gavrila Derzhavin, Yekaterina Vorontsova-Dashkova (companion to Catherine II) and Sablukov. All except the latter are extremely critical of Paul; the diplomats, says McGrew generally "give a more balanced view".

Anything indicative of equality or democracy was his target. Vasily Klyuchevsky considers Paul's policies as based on order, discipline and equality, and Michael W. Curran and David Mackenzie call his rule "enlightened absolutism".

=== Autocracy ===
Paul's demand for continuous service from his nobility eventually cost him his life; he "humiliated the nobility, turning them from comrades in arms into victims". Catherine gave him a captured Turkish prisoner, Ivan Pavlovich Kutaysov, whom Paul made a Russian count with a large estate to spite the nobility. His growing autocracy was in direct contrast with his upbringing as a constitutionalist:

Paul turned the idea inside out. He flooded his chancelleries with a stream of contradictory decrees ... he demanded strict conformity to a seemingly endless series of idiotic norms in dress, speech, and behaviour; and eventually, he created the very nightmare of despotic rule and personal insecurity the Panins had hoped so much to prevent.

The Russian aristocracy had become almost completely Westernized, and French was their first language. Paul seems to have equated aristocratic luxury with wastefulness, and believed that years of indulgent rule by a permissive female ruler had led to men (predominantly the nobility) becoming soft and socially irresponsible. Paul's edicts focused on the nobility's perceived social ills, and he wanted to instill in them a new moral discipline. In The New Cambridge Modern History, J. M. K. Vivyan writes that enmity with the nobility was inherent to Russia's tsars due to their vulnerability to palace coups; it was exacerbated in Paul's case by his treatment by his mother, who had supported the aristocracy. Paul distrusted his aristocracy, particularly those who dwelt on their estates rather than attending court.

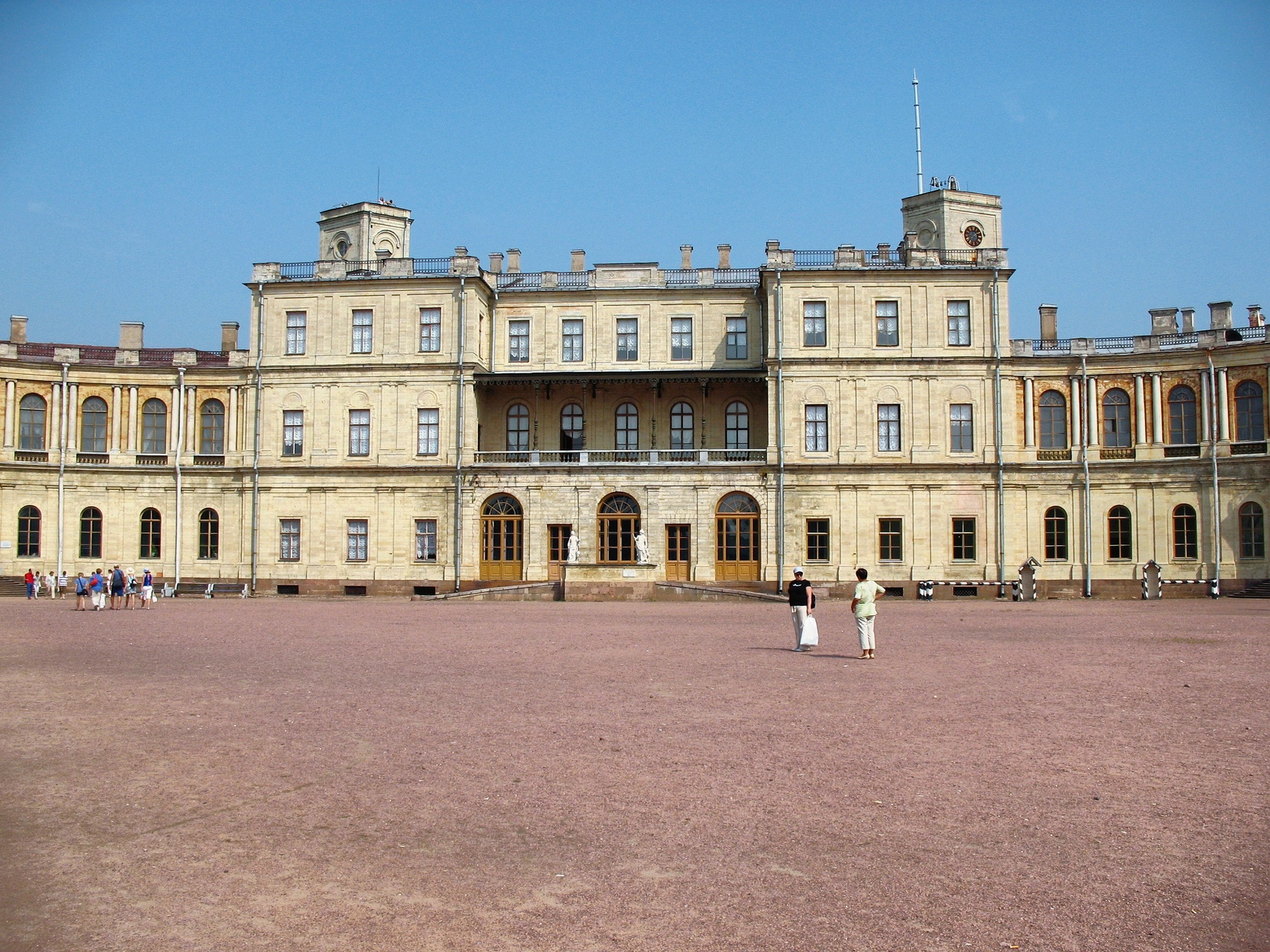
The parade ground outside Gatchina Palace in 2010

Overturning Catherine's policies, Paul severely constrained the aristocracy. He said, "only he is great in Russia to whom I am speaking, and only as long as I speak [to him]" (regardless of birth or status); S. S. Montefiore called this a sentiment "worthy of Caligula". D. Lieven says that Paul's idealized emperor-vassal relationship "did not represent late 18th-century Russian realities", especially his echoing of Caligula's dictum, "let them hate so long as they fear". He rolled back the political power of the aristocracy in every respect, annulling their exemption from corporal punishment. Lieven calls Paul's attack on the aristocracy's liberties limited, but enough to persuade them to conspire against him later. There appears to have been little or no resistance to him, however; Whitworth said that in other countries Paul's intemperate decrees might have been resisted, but where "the character of the people, and that spirit of subordination which yet prevails, scarcely a murmur is heard". McGrew notes the irony that the only class to forcibly resist Paul was the serfs, the class he had tried to protect. About 55 peasant uprisings were recorded between Catherine's death in November 1796 and the New Year, followed by nearly 120 in the first three months of 1797. (Note: Paul blamed his enemies for stirring the peasants up against him, rather than Jacobin influences.)

=== Opposition to the French Revolution ===
Paul's reign was marked by his aversion to French culture, influenced by the French Revolution several years earlier. He sought to curtail the spread of revolutionary ideas by targeting French influence in Russia. Paul restricted foreign travel, and required visitors from France to have passports issued by the House of Bourbon. Censorship intensified and Paul enforced strict regulations on fashion, prohibiting anything considered non-Russian (especially French). The secret police played a significant role in ensuring compliance with his edicts. Anything that hinted at revolution was banned. Paul's hatred of revolutions was based on his view that his citizens were like children, and should be monitored.

His actions against Jacobinism sometimes seemed comedic. Deeply fearful of the Jacobins, he believed himself surrounded by them. According to a contemporary account, Paul kept his estate in a permanent state of siege: "Every day, one hears of nothing but acts of violence. The Grand Duke thinks every moment that someone is wanting in respect or has the intention of criticizing his actions. He sees everywhere manifestations of the revolution."

=== Reversal of Catherine's policies ===
Paul refused to wear the imperial crown at his coronation because Catherine had worn it. (Note: Although, says historian Ian Grey, "he had inveighed constantly against her extravagance while she was alive ... he did not hesitate to order Duval, the Genevan who served as court jeweller, to make him a new crown, costing several million roubles".) New monarchs traditionally made bold breaks with their predecessors' policies, which he saw as righting Catherine's wrongs. Paul also attacked physical reminders of Catherine's reign, and Tsarskoe Selo (one of her favorite residences) was allowed to fall into disrepair as he tried to subvert her legacy. His reign was similar to that of his mother. The difference was based on personality; unlike Catherine, Paul "was capricious and unstable; his rule degenerated into one of abusive treatment". Before Catherine's death, French influence on Russia was already being curtailed; freedom of movement between the countries was restricted and diplomatic relations hardened, although French culture remained predominant. Catherine had placed all French citizens living in St. Petersburg under surveillance.

The nobility experienced a "golden age" under Catherine, but Paul disliked what he saw as the "immorality" of her reign and the nobility had their grants withdrawn. Changes of staff appointments "proceeded at a dizzying pace". Paul consistently undid his mother's policies: "With one stroke of the pen he abrogated a whole series of Catherine's decrees". He overturned his predecessors with changes which were good, bad or neutral. (Note: Kluchevsky writes that Paul expanded the gubernia system of provincial administration into Russian-controlled Denmark—the "system of provincial administration was, of course, a policy well calculated to facilitate and accelerate the process of moral-political absorption of Russia's alien, outlying races"—but abolished the system in Russian Poland and Sweden, restoring their indigenous administration.)

Paul was seen as authoritarian, and "fostered centraliz[ation]". According to historian Hugh Ragsdale, whereas Catherine was a "masterful opportunist [...] Paul was her polar opposite". Catherine had a policy of Russification, particularly in the Baltic states and Poland; Paul restored to these areas their local rights and devolved the interests of the Russian government. A. Cross notes that "Paul was prepared to do many things to spite the memory of his mother-but the restoration of any degree of freedom to publish was not one of them". Although Catherine had been known occasionally as "the Great" during her lifetime, during Paul's reign it achieved broad acceptance "perhaps partly in silent protest of Paul's ill-considered efforts to demean his mother".

=== Prussia ===
Paul admired all things Prussian. The philosophy was not confined to him; "Prussomania" had engulfed Europe during the 18th century, making the greatest impact in Russia. On Paul's first day as emperor, amid the installation of his Prussian-themed army, "the Court and the town are entirely military, and we can scarce persuade ourselves that instead of Petersburg we are not in Potsdam". According to Admiral Alexander Shishkov, "The change was so great, that it looked like nothing other than an enemy invasion [...] there were armed soldiers everywhere". Although Paul's accession was not via a military coup, it had the appearance of one as a result of his march on St. Petersburg with the Gatchina units. St. Petersburg had been one of the most modern European capitals under Catherine; under her son it was "more like a German one, two centuries back".

== Accession ==
My God! From the very outset of Emperor Paul I's accession, what strictness, what meekness, what a martial spirit began to rule in Moscow! From being arrogant and unapproachable, the nobles became humble, for the law was the same whether one was a noble or a merchant. Ostentatious luxury came under suspicion. And among the common people, there appeared a kind of terror and obedience before a sort of martial or enlightened-authoritarian spirit, for the strictness and obedience extended to all classes of people.

— Merchant Nikolai Kotov in his memoirs

Russian historian Basil Dmytryshyn described Russia after Paul's accession to the throne:

When he became emperor of Russia at the age of forty-two. Paul inherited an empire full of clashing contrasts and glaring contradictions. It was the largest and the most resourceful nation in the world, but its economy and its communication systems were among the most primitive. It had several good schools for the privileged few, but illiteracy was the way of life for the vast majority. It had a small class of cultured and privileged nobles who lived in sumptuous villas and who discussed the latest literary and political ideas of western Europe. But it also had millions of superstitious, illiterate, and exploited peasants, Russian as well as non-Russian, who lived in horrible filth and poverty. Finally, it had a new monarch who had long and passionately wanted to rule, but who was incompetent to govern any nation, let alone a complex, multi-national empire like Russia.

Paul was one of only four men to sit on the throne in 75 years, all of whom "reigned briefly and ingloriously if at all". (Note: There were seven years of male rule between the death of Peter the Great in 1725 and that of Paul in 1801, and all except Peter III (who died of smallpox) were assassinated.) He was cheered whenever he entered Moscow before his coronation, and the gentry particularly looked forward to his reign. Common people crowded around him in the streets: "He never showed the fear of ordinary people [...] and he unhesitatingly went among them, even at great personal danger to himself, to hear their complaints". This was a "striking characteristic" of his rule. The early days of Paul's reign were characteristic: "no relaxation from first to last". An anonymous report to Lord Grenville from Vienna early in his reign advised the foreign secretary, "I do not believe you will have any assistance from the Emperor ... and above all because, in his quality of successor to the throne, he is naturally disposed to adopt measures different from those of his predecessor".

The first sign that Paul intended to follow his father's legacy instead of his mother's came shortly after her burial. After praying at her side for four nights after her death, he led his family to a chapel to hear a requiem for Peter III. On the day of his coronation, 5 April 1797 (probably reacting to his earlier fears of being supplanted as Catherine's heir by his son), one of his first major acts was to incorporate primogeniture into the imperial succession. (Note: This law remained in force until the end of the regime in 1917.) He re-interred his father in an imperial sarcophagus next to Catherine, whom he assumed had been complicit in his overthrow and murder. The coffin was opened, and the royal family kissed what remained of Peter's hand. According to Michael Farquhar, "thus, after thirty-four years, the husband and wife who loathed each other in life were reunited in death". This "macabre ceremony" was followed by Peter's posthumous coronation.

Paul's reign began auspiciously, with the pardon of about 12,000 political prisoners. His first few months received "mixed reviews" from contemporaries; his desire to end abuses was praised, but his inconsistency, bad temper and punishments were criticized. Reporting one's social superiors to Paul with a private petition was encouraged, and he had a yellow box installed outside the Winter Palace—the sole key to which he possessed—from which he collected petitions. Satires and caricatures also began to be left in the box, however, and he had it removed. Peasants, allowed to petition individually, were forbidden to do so collectively.

== Edicts ==
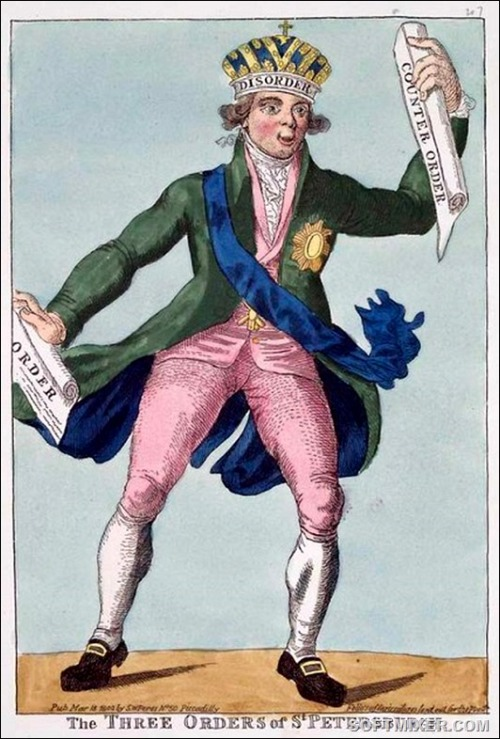
1800 cartoon by Isaac Cruikshank

Paul disapproved of nearly all aspects of Saint Petersburg society, and what he found offensive he intended to correct. His reign began "almost immediately [by] alienating the major power groups" of Russian society. Paul alienated liberals by censoring their literature, the military by imposing Prussian military culture, merchants and the mercantile classes by disrupting trade through his foreign policy, and the nobility by capriciously humiliating them. He appointed General Nikolai Arkharov to the civil position of governor-general of the city, and Arkharov willingly implemented Gatchina-style rules. Arkharov was responsible for the severe enforcement of imperial edicts, and his police "won fame of a sort for their unrestrained, often violent, and usually mindless handling of violators". As governor of Saint Petersburg, he became known as the "minister of terror" for his zeal in enforcing Paul's edicts.

Saint Petersburg became a social minefield. Its tension was increased by the speed with which new regulations were issued, and people were afraid to leave their homes in case they broke a new, unknown rule. Thousands were arrested, and "the populace from top to bottom lived in increasing fear of an arbitrary, capricious emperor [...] a police straitjacket tightened upon Russian society, arbitrary arrests multiplied, and insecurity rose among the elite". (Note: The numbers arrested for precise crimes is unknown, but on ascending the throne Alexander I is known to have released about 12,000 people imprisoned in the previous reign. The numbers contrast sharply with the number of police cases brought under Catherine: 862 in 35 years, compared to 721 in five years under her son.) Corporal punishment was also common; an army captain was sentenced to 100 cane strokes, a priest was knouted for owning banned books, and an officer had his tongue cut out.

Paul's views were ideological; much was changing across Europe (especially culturally) which he viewed as signs of social disorder and weakness. His decrees were criticized internationally; in Scotland, The Scots Magazine said that "probably with a view to preventing the progress of Liberty, the Emperor has attempted to check the expansion of intellect and to destroy the source of knowledge through the Empire". According to The Cambridge Modern History, "Russia in general speedily realized the worst that had been prophesied of Paul". He issued over 2,000 ukases during his five-year reign, and 48,000 general orders in 1797 alone. Paul's decrees affected the empire as a whole; Whitworth wrote, "the ardour for reform, or more properly for a change, extends even to the Provinces, where everything as in the Capital must now wear a military appearance". Paul's reforms sowed "confusion, uncertainty and irritation".

=== Military ===
He was obsessed with the paraphernalia of war, and army officers were forbidden to eat lunch while wearing their hats. When Field Marshal Alexander Suvorov objected to Paul's treatment of the army, he was banished to his estates. (Note: Where he remained until 1799, when Paul restored him to favour and ordered him to lead Russian forces against Napoleon in Italy.) This poor treatment was crucial to Paul's overthrow. In addition to forcing Prussian-style uniforms upon the military, he ruled them with an iron fist.

While watching a parade one morning with Count Nikolai Vasilyeich Repnin, Paul said: "Marshal, you see this guard of 400 men? At one word, I could promote every one of them to marshal". He also applied the principles he enforced at Gatchina to Saint Petersburg society, which would be drilled like the military. Although the military rule book laid down boundaries of conduct, civilian regulations did not:

Orders were given and enforced hour by hour. Sometimes they were published, and sometimes not, and there was no comprehensive summary of the radical restrictions on dress, for example, until early in 1798. (Note: Published on 24 January [O.S. 13 January] 1798.) It was the subjects' responsibility to keep abreast, though even the enforcers could not stay fully informed. This condition, of course, added substantially to the anxiety in people's lives.

The army was reorganized along Prussian lines, with Prussian uniforms and "draconian" discipline. The uniforms were tight enough to prevent men from sitting, and kept them from standing up on their own if they fell over; an English observer compared them to the "stiff, wooden machines" of the Seven Years' War. Hair was plaited and set with a "noisesome" paste of wax, lard, and flour, which became malodorous with time. Paul "regarded the waxed Prussian plaits as the expression of the ancien régime against the tousled locks of French freedom". He introduced impractical items such as buckled shoes. According to Cobenzl, over half the officers of the Imperial Guard resigned their commissions. The edicts were the product of Paul's belief that "relaxation in the norms expected of a gentleman would undermine respect for their betters among the populace".

Transfers, demotion, the recall to service of officers in civilian and court posts, appeared not as a vast reform but as an exercise in tyranny. The garrison of the capital lived under a kind of parade-ground terror, and it became common for officers to parade with their affairs wound up and with a stock of ready money lest they were sent off the square straight to Siberia.

Sealed coaches were maintained during every parade to whisk away those who incurred Paul's displeasure. General Alexander Sablukov reported that he had done so himself, and loaned money on three occasions to comrades: "When we mounted guard, we used to put a few hundred roubles in banknotes into our coat pockets so as not to be left penniless if suddenly sent away". Paul occasionally beat men on parade; an entire troop could be transferred to the provinces in an instant, cashiered, or its officers reduced in rank to foot soldiers. Paul took pleasure in his role as a drill sergeant, and brutal punishments—such as flogging with the knout—were inflicted on culprits. Conversely, a soldier on review might find himself promoted on the spot. According to Sablukov, royal military service under Paul was "very unpleasant".

=== Civilian ===
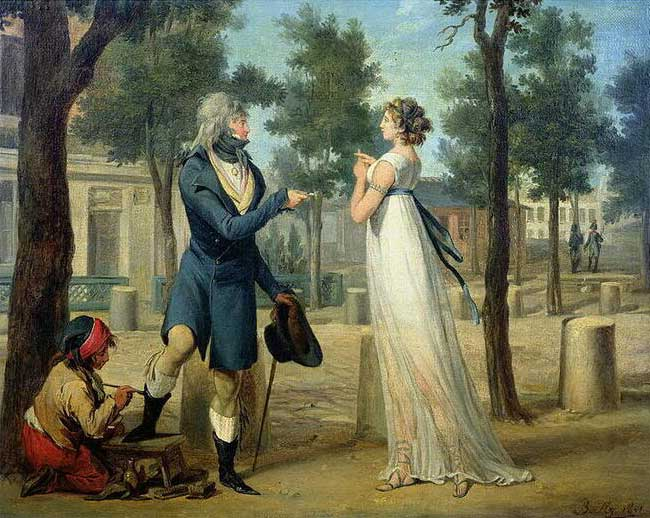
Fashion in 1797 under the French Directory; the round hat and high cravat worn by the man in the center were condemned by Paul.

Paul's domestic policy was unpopular, particularly with the Russian nobility. Changes in dress had begun at Catherine's death; "new uniforms were fitted, sewn, and worn in a matter of hours; frock-coats disappeared or were turned into emergency cloaks by slashing scissors, while even round hats could be folded and pinned to form a tricorn". The latest fashion in women's hairstyles was à la guillotine; like other Parisian fashion, it was expunged. Paul battled "the whole of contemporary male chic", and brandished his horsewhip at pedestrians in the street.

Attacks with shears on people's clothing in the streets recalled Peter I's assaults on traditional caftans and beards, but now anything reminiscent of French as opposed to Russian dress, including associated vocabulary (gilet, pantalon), was suspect. Paul banned certain books, music and foreign travel, much as Catherine had done after 1793 in her understandable response to the French Terror, but the need for such sanctions now seemed unconvincing, as did the introduction of a host of niceties Of etiquette that victimized nobles who under Catherine were beginning to enjoy some degree of security. Demands such as the one that ladies curtsy to the emperor in the street and thus drag their clothes in the mud seemed demeaning. For men, the wrong belt buckle or a step out of place would result in a humiliating beating or banishment.

==== Prostration ====
One of the most unpopular edicts, promulgated in late 1800, dealt with how to behave when encountering the emperor's carriage in the street. Regardless of age, gender, class, or mode of transport, all had to dismount (or alight their conveyance) immediately. The police were especially concerned about implementing the decree. Men had to bow deeply if Paul passed them in the street, and remain bowed until he had passed. Ladies had to prostrate themselves, regardless of the condition of the roads on which they had to kneel. This may have been a means of demonstrating his power. People learned where Paul or his family were likely to be traveling, and avoided those streets if possible to avoid the public prostration (Note: Writer and German consul August von Kotzebue wrote that when travelling through Saint Petersburg, he would be looking for the emperor to have time to alight from his coach.) required by law. Paul reprimanded a nanny who was pushing a baby's stroller for not removing the baby's sunbonnet, removing it himself. (Note: The baby in question was future poet Alexander Pushkin.) "Wallowing in the pomp and circumstance of power", he demanded that his nobility prostrate themselves before him. Those seen wearing forbidden round hats were pursued by the police and, if caught, might be bastinadoed. Three hundred police officers were detailed to uphold the emperor's social decrees. Clothes would be shredded in front of their owners, and shoes confiscated in the street.

Those wishing to hold balls, parties or other social gatherings—including weddings and funerals—had to follow detailed legislation, including receiving the necessary permission to do so from the local police. A police officer would attend the gathering to ensure against any lack of "loyalty, propriety and sobriety". Tailors, hatters, shoemakers and other clothiers had to apply to the quartermaster at Gatchina for instruction on the styles they were allowed to make.

==== French fashions ====
Scholar Lynn Hunt, discussing the fashions of revolutionary France, described the uniform of a "true Republican" as "close-fitting pants of fine cloth, ankle boots, morning coats and round hats". Paul opposed what he saw as "French degeneracy". Everything he banned was suggestive of revolutionary France: clothing (round hats, frock coats, high collars), language (he forbade public use of the words "society", "citizen" and "revolution") or culture (European music and literature were banned), regardless of scientific or intellectual merit. Mention of the Enlightenment was also forbidden, since Paul believed that it had led to the revolution. The press was heavily censored, although Catherine had also censored the press. (Note: Mass book burnings were carried out in 1793 and 1794 of the works of Nikolay Novikov; his print shop was confiscated, and he served 15 years in Shlisselburg Fortress before Paul released him.) Paul was more energetic in his efforts, however, and his decrees "closed down any pretensions of literary liberalism". Banned books included Catherine's Instructions, a series of legal-philosophical musings based on writers such as Montesquieu, Cesare Beccaria and William Blackstone. Books from France were targeted, since they were dated according to the French revolutionary calendar. Booksellers were controlled by the police.

Waistcoats were particularly important to Paul. Dorothea Lieven later said, "the emperor claimed that waistcoats caused the entire French Revolution somehow". (Note: Contemporaries were aware of the "power and of a striking impression that a certain garment can make on an individual"; in his writings, Lord Byron frequently links dress and weaponry.) Clothing was restricted to solid colors. Buildings had to be repainted black and white, with instruction provided for the decoration of their doors. Orders such as these created a "crazy atmosphere" in St. Petersburg during Paul's reign.

Diarist and commentator Filipp Vigel was in Kiev when the emperor's clothing edicts were announced, and recognized their political overtones:

One thing struck me in Kiev—new costumes. In a state of madness, punishing not a stone, as Zhukovskii says about Napoleon, but dress, Paul armed himself against round hats, tailcoats, waistcoats, pantaloons, shoes and boots with cuffs. He prohibited wearing them and ordered to replace [these garments] with single-breasted caftans with a stand-up collar, tricornes, camisoles, small-clothes [short breeches] and jackboots".

In 1797, Paul issued an ukase prohibiting certain items of dress (round hats, top-boots, trousers and laced shoes) and making others (such as the tricorn, powdered queues, buckled shoes and breeches) mandatory. The wearing of square-toed shoes and gaiters was enforced, and men "were forced to lock waistcoats and other ominous garments in their trunks until Paul's death". Any style that was new and fashionable was banned, including trousers, frock coats, round hats, top boots, laced shoes, low collars, tails, waistcoats, and boots. Scissors were taken to the tails of "revolutionary" frock coats. This was a particular attack on the nobility, and "nothing was so odious" for them.

Paul dictated "the only lawfully permissible wear", and his judicial assaults have been described as "tyrannical caprices"; these clothes had been permitted during Catherine's reign. Turned-down coat collars were cut off, and waistcoats were ripped off. Hats were confiscated, and their wearers were interrogated at the nearest guardhouse. His campaign against hats and cravats was probably an expression of his desire for discipline and conformity in civilian dress, similar to what he had imposed upon the army. Paul regulated citizen deportment, coach size and the number of horses that pulled them, according to owner status. He concerned himself with the thickness of mustaches, hair (combed back from the forehead), the depth of women's curtsies, and the angle at which hats were worn. Toupées, bright ribbons, large curls in hair, and sideburns were banned. Paul saw round hats and laced shoes as lower-class apparel. Round hats, high cravats and colorful scarves were banned. No excuses were accepted, and punishment was severe.

Paul recruited secret police, who searched the streets for men in round hats, whose hats were torn from their heads and burnt. They were apparently acceptable if the wearer was in traditional dress. Men with wide lapels had them cut off in the street. (Note: According to J. L. H. Keep, such reports are "apocryphal".) By the end of 1796, Paul was the only person in Russia with legal liberties. He placed the police above the law; they enforced his edicts zealously, guarding citizens against "malevolent influences".

The nobility was influenced by French ideas, and Catherine had generally encouraged this; Paul immediately targeted both, attacking their privileges and banning most liberal ideas and activities. Waltzes were banned as licentious, except in front of him; waltzers in his presence had to ensure that when they faced him, their "every pose must imply the instinct of obeisance to the Emperor".

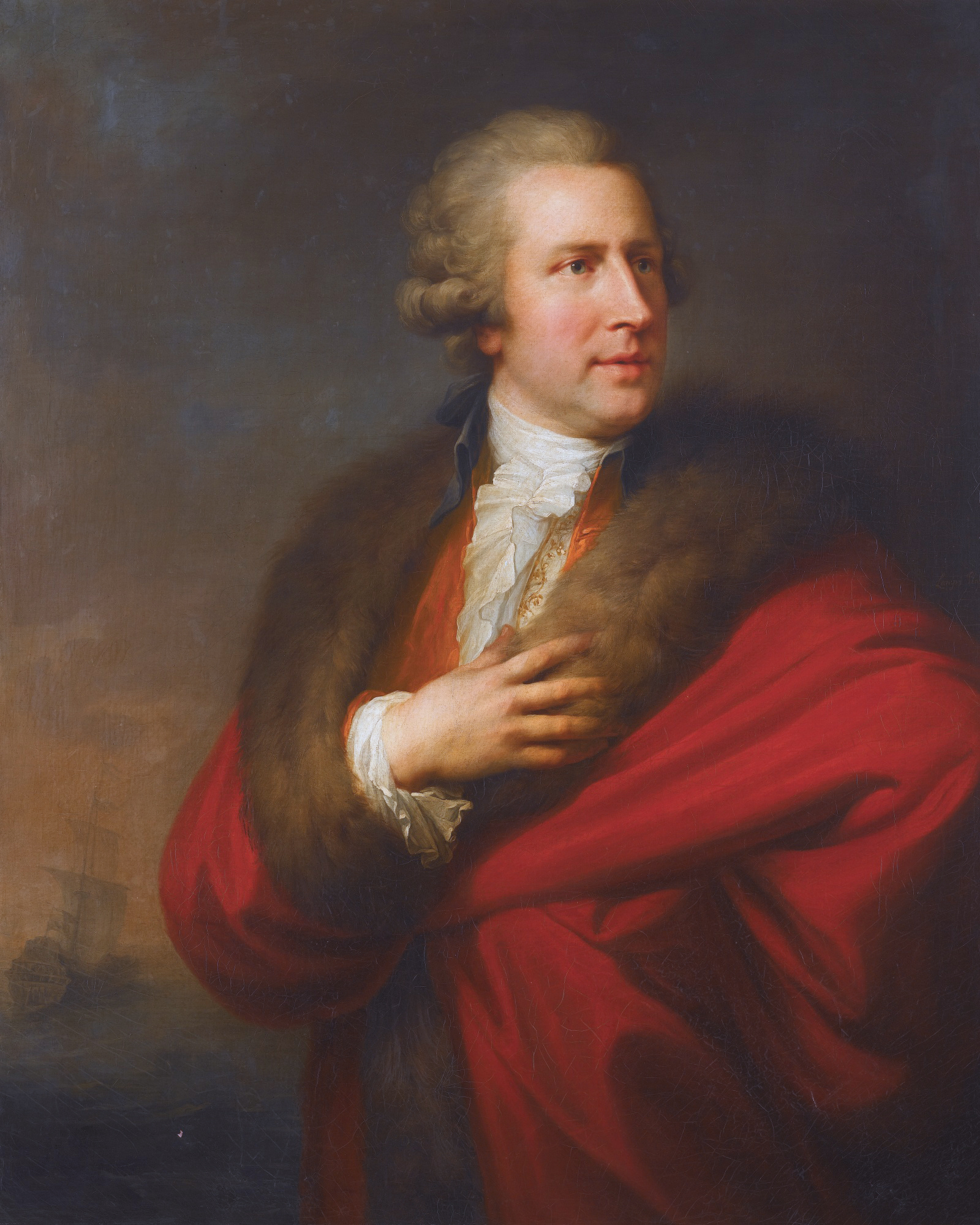
Portrait of Charles Whitworth, ambassador to imperial Russia

Literature and theatre considered influenced by French thinkers was suppressed. Homegrown literature was banned; although the Freemasons were a legitimate body (flourishing under Paul), their publications were proscribed. (Note: Literary historian Anthony Cross wrote, "The history of Russian literature in the age of Paul might seem to be the history of its censorship".) Thirteen words were banned, and some Gallicisms were replaced with Prussianisms; some words were removed, but not replaced. Paul or his censors may not have kept up with what they had banned. Banned words included otechevesto (fatherland), grazhdanin, and obshchestvo.

Paul was partly motivated by the popularity of French fashions during Catherine's reign. His reforms were directed at the aristocracy, whom Catherine had encouraged to imitate that of France at Versailles. Fashion in directoire France was a reaction against the sombre, egalitarian clothes forced on the populace by the Jacobin government. With the Thermidorian Reaction came a return to fancy clothes, especially colourful waistcoats and chin-high cravats. (Note: Cravats became "not merely a clue to a man's profession, but a guide to his social and political convictions".)

Driving, even of troikas, was slow. Balls and dances before the imperial couple, said Polish diplomat Adam Jerzy Czartoryski, were events where "one risked losing his liberty" as in-house spies reported to the emperor or his wife anything which could be construed as a slight against them.

The cultural transition occurred almost overnight. According to Czartoryski, "Never was there any change of scene at a theatre so sudden and so complete as the change of affairs at the accession of Paul. In less than a day, costumes, manners, occupations, all were altered". Biographer E. M. Almedingen wrote that "less than a fortnight after the death of the Empress, a thick grey curtain fell upon the once gay 'Venice of the North'". Russian diplomat Yury Golovkin described Saint Petersburg under Paul as a prison controlled from the Winter Palace, "before which one may not pass, even in the absence of the sovereign, without taking off one's hat"; one could not approach "without showing police passes seven times over". Foreigners, officially exempt from this treatment, usually received it as well since police did not question those whom they stopped; the visiting nephew of British ambassador Charles Whitworth was manhandled like a Russian, and Whitworth changed his headgear to avoid similar treatment.

=== Foreign policy ===
Domestic affairs had primacy for most of Paul's reign and, until 1797, were the sole focus of his activity. (Note: Oxford scholar T. C. W. Blanning writes that "of all the great powers, Russia was the most strident in condemning the French Revolution; of all the great powers, Russia was the last European power to go to war against it".) Paul's "domestic tyranny coincided with a bizarre foreign policy". Early foreign policy had signs of maturity, recalling expeditionary forces from Persia and releasing Polish prisoners. Paul reversed Catherine's policy towards the south by neglecting areas she had confiscated from the Ottoman Empire, and opposed serfs who escaped to Novorossiya being treated as colonists rather than fugitives. One arbitrary edict banned the trade of timber with Britain. Banned items could not enter or leave Russia. Paul's behavior encouraged foreign observers to believe that Russia would sink back into obscurity.

He felt he had been insulted at not being invited to the Congress of Rastatt in 1797—which was "redrawing the map of Germany without consulting him"—and France's seizure of Malta confirmed his anti-French policy. French visitors were only allowed into Russia with a passport from the Bourbons, rather than the French revolutionary government, "proving he would not be a source of revolutionary propaganda". Paul welcomed French émigrés, however, and granted the future king, Louis XVIII, a pension and an estate.

Concerns arose that his foreign policy was becoming erratic, and his planned invasion of India was considered "dangerous and even foolish". When his son heard about the plan, he said that his father had "declared war on common sense". According to James Jenny, Paul's speedy rejection of Britain as an ally against Napoleon made the nobility question his sanity. (Note: Rumours circulated that British agents had had a hand in the conspiracy against Paul. One of Paul's statesmen, Viktor Kochubey, wrote to colleague Semyon Vorontsov: "You will see that the English have bought powerful men among us". The aristocracy, already afraid of the spread of French revolutionary ideas to Russia, opposed conciliation with France. English agents may have fomented dissension.) Opinions varied among Paul's contemporaries whether he was a fool to a hero, "the dupe or the willing creature". (Note: Ragsdale noted in 1973 that foreign researchers did not have access to Soviet archives.) According to Muriel Atkin, Paul's foreign policy was more pragmatic than his other policies or that of his son. Russian scholar Boris Nolde wrote that Paul was proactive in expanding Russian territories, but unable to base his policies on analysis.

== Last years ==
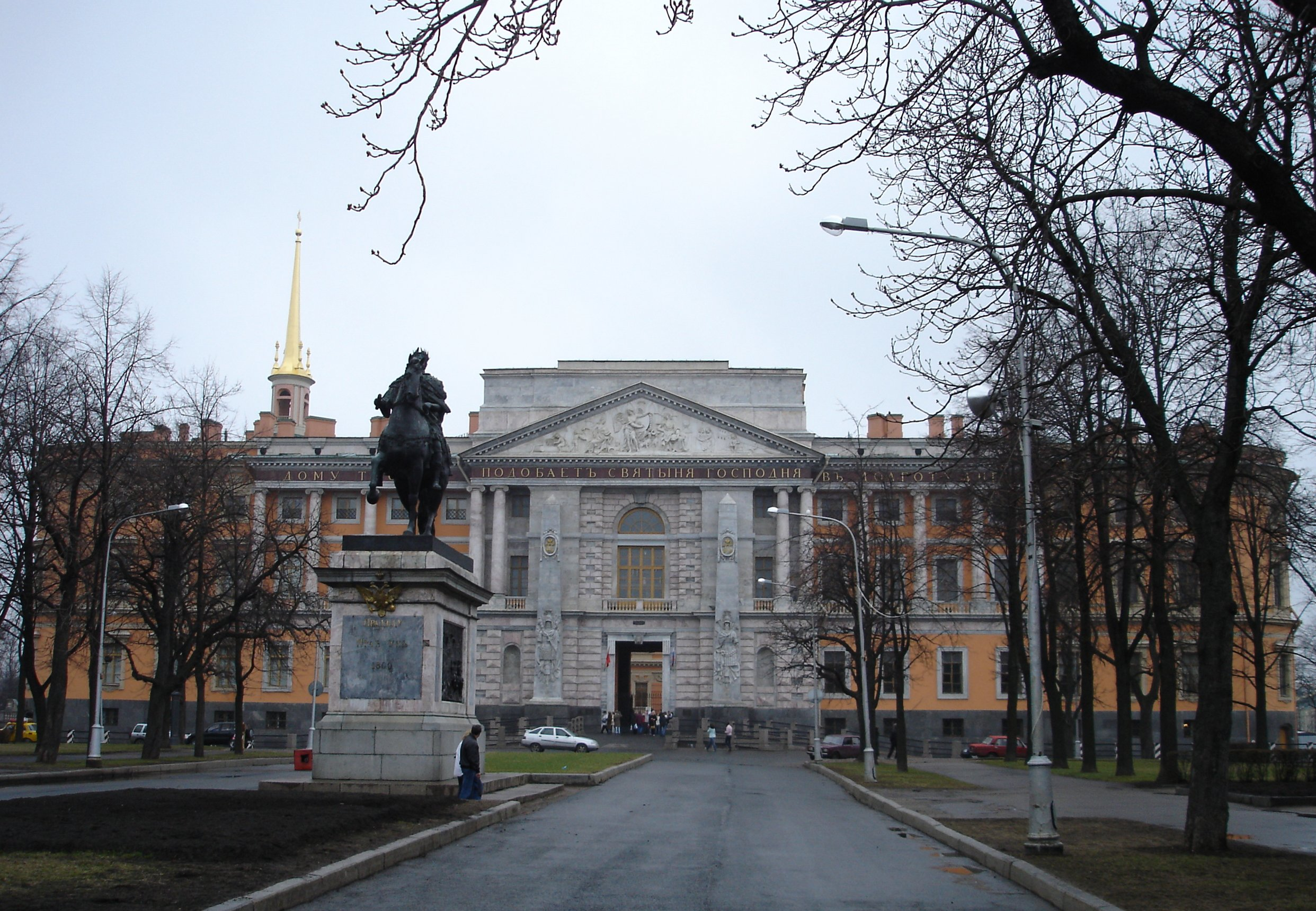
Saint Michael's Castle, where Paul was killed three weeks after moving in

Paul's violent outbursts increased during the last year of his reign, and he seemed to stop taking his minister's advice; "Everyone about him is at a loss what to do. Even Kutaisof is becoming very anxious". His mental state apparently declined in the last few months of his life, illustrated by his intention of invading India and telling European heads of state that to resolve the Napoleonic Wars, they should engage in personal combat. Paul challenged the other European rulers to individual duels early in 1801, saying that they should be "accompanied as equerries, arbiters, and heralds by their most enlightened ministers and most able generals, such as Messieurs Thugut, Pitt, [and] Bernstorff, himself proposing to be accompanied by Generals Pahlen and Kutuzov".

Around this time, he complained about a "buzzing" in his ears. His family and favorites were not spared from his erratic behavior; his barber (now a count) suffered, and his son Constantine and his wife were only allowed to talk to each other in bed at night.

In 1800 Whitworth reported to London that Paul was "literally not in his senses". He told Grenville that he had suspected it for some time, but "since he has come to the throne, his disorder has gradually increased, and now manifests itself in such a manner as to fill everyone with the most obvious alarm". Paul was now increasingly under the influence of his doctor, James Wylie, who "in constant close contact with Paul ... came to realize the extent of the tsar's mental instability".

His policies devolved from political to pathological, increasingly governed by his mood swings rather than analysis. Fearful that the Winter Palace was too accessible for assassins (and his enemies were already inside the palace), he ordered a new fortress built outside the city in 1798. Saint Michael's Castle, surrounded by drawbridges, moats and earthworks, also contained a number of secret underground passages for escape. The castle was completed in 1801, and in February Paul moved his family in. His behavior had worsened by this time; another one of his doctors, John Rogerson, expressed concern about the emperor's health: "The cloud is darkening, the incoherence of his movements increases and becomes more manifest from day to day". Paul's wife, Maria Feodorovna, said that "there is no one who does not daily remark on the disorder of his faculties". Paul's unpredictable behavior and resulting policies were a direct reason for the conspiracy which overthrew him in favor of his son, Alexander, (Note: Scholar Dominic Lieven says that Paul had also attacked the nobility in a more materially-damaging way when he dissolved their provincial assemblies.) and his foreign policy may have convinced Alexander to authorize the deposition.

=== Assassination ===
Paul had offended too many important vested interests and, with Alexander's permission, members of the nobility plotted to remove him. The deposition took place during the evening of 23 March 1801 when, during a struggle, Paul was killed. His death was attributed to apoplexy, which was plausible given the "insensate rages" for which he was notorious.

The aristocracy did not often speak (or act) as a bloc, which prevented them from offering a united resistance. Paul's assassination indicates that there was an unstated boundary beyond which a tsar should not step without the consent of the nobility. Lieven writes that Paul's claim that no one was noble in Russia except he to whom Paul was speaking contributed to his downfall, along with his foreign policy and attacks on the nobility.

== Accession of Alexander I ==
After Paul's assassination and the accession of Alexander I, Paul's mandates were repealed. There were "no tears" at his funeral, and people "genuinely exulted" at the opportunity to wear round hats, cravats and cutaway coats. In her memoirs, Countess Varvara Golovina described seeing a shouting hussar officer riding his horse up and down the Quay with Sphinxes: "'Now we can do anything we like!' This was his idea of liberty!"

There was spontaneous rejoicing by the nobility and bourgeoisie. Paul was apparently loved by the common people, however, and "allegedly more votary candles burned on the grave of Paul than any other Tsar". An Austrian diplomat in St. Petersburg at the time said that "the general joy at the change of regime, most marked in the capital cities and among the military and service nobility, was [...] the normal reaction to the death of every Russian ruler".

Russian media quickly began promoting French, English, German and other European fashions of the day, which changed weekly. Alexander released thousands of people who had been imprisoned or exiled to Siberia due to Paul, reopened printing presses, restored foreign travel and cultural interaction, and reduced censorship. (Note: Not completely; at the time, and for the next century, it was said that Paul had died of a stroke. The full story of the regicide was not published until 1901.)

=== Later events ===
The words "waistcoat", "tailcoat" and "pantaloons" did not re-enter the Dictionary of the Russian Academy for decades. In his 1833 verse novel, poet Alexander Pushkin mentions the strangeness of some words even then: "No pantalony frak, zhilet/Vsekh etikh slow na russkom net" ("But pants, tailcoat, vest/There are no such words in Russian"). (Note: Ivleva notes that Pushkin also associated the waistcoat with French revolutionary ideals.) Empress Alexandra Feodorovna, the wife of Nicholas II, told her husband (who was facing discontent in the State Duma in 1916) that in dealing with his enemies he should be more like "Peter the Great, Ivan the Terrible, Emperor Paul—crush them under you".

== Personality ==
Signs of paranoia emerged when Paul was a young man, particularly towards his mother. Biographer Henri Troyat said that when he found small pieces of glass in his food, the young Paul ran screaming to Catherine's apartment and accused her of trying to kill him. The French correspondent Bérenger reported that Paul publicly and repeatedly questioned his father's death and exhibited "evidence of sinister and dangerous inclinations".

Paul's "odd obsessions" led directly to Russia's involvement in the wars against revolutionary France which had been initiated by Catherine. (Note: Particularly his obsessions with the island of Malta and its ancient order. When Napoleon captured the island in June 1798, Paul "took it as a personal affront".) An absolutist, Paul's personality flaws made him take absolutism "to its logical, and therefore politically irrational, end".

The mental strain of being aware of his uncertain patrilineally and his father's murder combined to make him "quick-tempered, impulsive, inconsistent, and generally high-strung". (Note: One of Paul's tutors wrote, "Paul has an intelligent mind in which there is a kind of machine that hangs by a mere thread; if the thread breaks, the machine begins to spin, and then farewell to reason and intelligence". Years later, Ambassador Whitworth said something similar; although Paul was "endowed with a more than common share of Wit and Penetration, so wanting in Solidity, and consequently so easily drawn aside by Trifles".) He was a "nervous and suspicious eccentric. He was a stubborn, quick-tempered, unpredictable, absolutist, embittered man." "Fear and suspicion made him erratic, totally unreasonable and unpredictable"; Ragsdale ascribes this to Paul's upbringing, which made him feel "exceptionally important and exceptionally insecure".

== Opinions and historiography ==
=== Contemporary opinion ===
Although Paul is generally agreed to have been "with varying degrees of explicitness" mentally abnormal, there is "an undercurrent of suspicion" that this has been artificially influenced by a small number of contemporaries and their memoirs (which historiographers should avoid). Better contemporary sources exist than memoirs, including writings of Paul's intimates (such as his tutors), records of his public appearances, and foreign diplomatic reports. Diplomatic reports and briefings are considered useful sources. There are sufficient complaints in contemporary sources to conclude that people hated what Paul was doing, but he ignored the complaints. Alexander wrote,

No remonstrance is ever tolerated until the damage has already been done. In short, to speak plainly, the happiness of the State counts for nothing in the governing of affairs. There is only one absolute power, which does everything without rhyme or reason. It would be impossible to enumerate to you all the mad things that have been done ... My poor country is in an indescribable state: farmers are harassed, commerce obstructed, and liberty and personal welfare are reduced to nothing. That is the picture of Russia.

Alexander's wife, Elizabeth Alexeievna, also disliked Paul. To her mother she called him widerwartig (disgusting), and he "said so himself. And his wish is generally fulfilled, he is feared and hated." Paul's Grand Marshal, Fyodor Rostopchin, blamed Paul's advisors rather than the emperor. Rostopchin later wrote that he was "surrounded by such people that the most honest would deserve to be hanged without trial", and Paul was "destroying himself and contriving the means of making himself hated". Paul's mental condition may have allowed his assassins to persuade themselves that they were acting in the interests of Russia rather than themselves if they saw the country's interests "threatened by an insane Tsar".

=== Historiography ===
A petty tyrant, with regular outbursts of intense rage, the "salient feature" of his policy was to reverse his mother's policy where he could. Paul "had an unhappy talent for making even his wisest moves appear ill-considered". His problem with the army was focusing on superficial details rather than broad reorganization, which contemporaries called the "Gatchina spirit": "parades and manoeuvres, uniforms and equipment, awards and punishments, in short with the minutiae of army life, and a corresponding neglect of weightier matters likely to prove decisive in war: morale, professional training [and] technical progress". Paul's changes were nether revolutionary nor swiftly imposed, but his policies have been summarized as "instability and capriciousness". His reign was an "embarrassment" for his successors.

Some of his intimates, such as Count Pahlen, may have manipulated Paul and the events around him to create an impression of bizarre behavior to subtly pave the way for the eventual coup; however, "even if Paul was not the monster his detractors claimed he was, it is doubtful he deserves the approving tone which marks some recent writing". Historian David R. Stone says that Paul's edicts about round hats and cravats, for example, were a "small matter that symbolized a larger shortcoming". Paul probably believed that his policies, hated by those at whom they were directed, were improving people's happiness; however, "there is no denying that the man was bizarre and that his conduct was radically imprudent".

Historian John W. Strong says that Paul has traditionally had "the dubious distinction of being known as the worst Tsar in the history of the Romanov dynasty", concluding that such "generalizations [...] are no longer satisfactory". Anatole G. Mazour called Paul "one of the most colourful personalities" of his dynasty. Russian historians have been dismissive of Paul because of his eccentricities, and I. A. Fedosov called him a "crazy despot [who] threatened to discredit the very idea of absolutism". Paul was no more absolutist than Catherine had been, however, and "consensus had to be achieved on her terms". Paul's reign was an object lesson, regardless of his good intentions, in the need for security and calm instead of arbitrary government. Paul's campaign against his mother's legacy demonstrated the dangers of autocracy in irresponsible hands, and the nobility realized that "autocratic power could destroy privileges as well as grant them". A "frivolous petty tyrant", Paul's "anecdotal" brutality made him a caricature. Although his domestic policy may have been rational in intention, its execution was irrational. Professor Bernard Pares called Paul "essentially a tyrant", and historian Lindsey Hughes said that his reign contrasted sharply with that of his "laid back" predecessor.

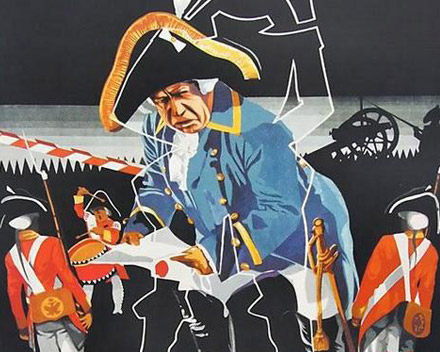
Poster for the 1934 film, Lieutenant Kijé

McGrew, like Rostochpin, wrote that Paul was let down by his subordinates, who were "either venal or incompetent"; he described the tsar as a "small-minded martinet who might order but could never lead". His reign exemplifies the importance of the individual in history in the ease and speed with which Paul dismantled so much of Catherine's work. Marc Raeff wrote that Paul's reign demonstrates the danger of failing to institutionalize bureaucracy, giving it an inherent risk of being at the mercy of a highly personalized style of governance such as his. His reign is "controversial and disputed"; Cobenzl noted that although the emperor had ability and good intentions, his mercurial personality and with inexperience made his approach ineffective. Historian Walther Kirchner described Paul's reforms as "arbitrary and useless", and Rey noted their internal inconsistency.

Other surviving examples of Paul's eccentricities have been accepted by historians as having a kernel of truth. Lieutenant Kijé, a fictional creation on a military recruitment list (the result of a clerical misspelling), was reportedly promoted to general, died and was demoted without the tsar ever seeing him. A living man was written out of existence. (Note: A a 1934 film of the same name by Boris Gusman, scored by Prokofiev, satirized bureaucracy.) Hearing of the non-existent Kijé's untimely death, Paul reportedly replied "that it is a great pity, as he was such a good officer". This "factual life of [a] fictitious lieutenant" was first described by lexicographer Vladimir Dal, who said that he heard it from his father.

== Positive aspects ==
Revisionism began with M. V. Kloökov's 1913 history of Paul's reign, in which he wrote that contemporary memoirs and accounts were biased or otherwise unreliable; according to Kloökov, in Paul's administrative work he should be seen as an enlightened absolutist. (Note: McGrew believes that the temptation to view Paul sympathetically over time stems from his poor upbringing to his assassination; "the discovery that he had ideas, that he was by no means a nonentity, and that his programs related to broadly modernizing tendencies in Russian development" reinforce the attraction.) Muriel Atkin wrote that "if no one has yet claimed that Paul was an exceptionally wise and able man, some historians, at least, have shown that he was neither as foolish nor as mad as the partisans of Catherine and Alexander would have him believe."

Catherine's reign had seen government spending and debt rise dramatically, with hyperinflation and a decline in tax revenue. Her court may have been brilliant on the surface, but

Paul, ignoring brilliance, focusing on what he saw as wrong and how to correct it ... to have responsible people in charge, but it was also imperative to establish institutions, and relations among institutions, which would promote discipline and control.

Paul had reformist instincts, exemplified by his edicts against serfdom, but his ability to follow them stemmed from character traits and antipathy towards Catherine. His reformist inclinations have not been universally accepted, but "McGrew's conclusions do not seem unreasonable"; Jews did not suffer under his reign as they had done previously. Despite the brevity of his reign, he was responsible for significant, often progressive innovations in administration. There was a degree of rehabilitation of Paul's reign during the late 20th century, particularly by Soviet historians. His policy, however, "came less of the fact that he realized the existing order to be inequitable and inadequate than of the fact that he still bore antipathy to his mother, and still cherished wrath against her assistants". Paul avoided progressive policies if they seemed overly similar to his mother's.

The crown became a major employer; the administration of Paul's decrees required a drastic increase in personnel, and he paid well. Although both Catherine and Paul were lavish with personal gifts to supporters, Paul was more generous and "pour[ed] literally millions of roubles in salaries, pensions and land grants" to hundreds of government employees. Whitworth said that Paul's liberalism with money tempered popular dislike of his social policies, and his continuation of those policies while keeping the citizenry onside augured well for his future.

Much of what Paul attacked—laxity in tax collecting and slackness in the civil service, for example—needed reform; he also simplified some aspects of local government and established schools of medicine. "There is no doubt that brusque as Paul's approach was", he had successes tempered with "a measure of the absurd". Paul's regulation of the speed of St Petersburg's troikas benefited the city's pedestrians. He attempted to re-instill discipline into the Russian Army (which had slipped in the latter years of his mother's reign), in addition to centralizing the army's War College. Although Paul's treatment of his army officers verged on brutality, he was admired by the common soldier for his willingness to treat their officers without fear of favor and had "genuine care" for their lot. He was less well-known (or liked) than Catherine, but went further than his mother did to increase the rights of serfs. Paul was popular in the countryside, where landowners respected an emperor who cracked down on corrupt local officials.

McGrew wrote that "much of what Paul intended and did [...] had its praiseworthy side". He restored the Governing Senate, which had fallen into disuse and was plagued by absenteeism, to a functioning court of appeal which adjudicated 12,000 cases during the first year of his reign.

Aspects of Paul's reign have become mythological, and an account of Paul promoting a sergeant so he could guard his sledge is apocryphal. Such exaggerations "illustrate the wealth of myth that for too long has impeded serious historical research" into Paul's reign. (Note: The tale was repeated by German scholar Alfred Vagts: "The Emperor Paul, leaving his palace one day, ordered a sergeant on guard duty to board his sled, saying 'Climb in, lieutenant.' The man protested, 'Sire, I am but a sergeant.' Paul replied, 'Climb in, captain.' Three days later the newly-commissioned officer, by now a lieutenant colonel, caused the emperor some offence and found himself reduced to the ranks as suddenly as he had risen from them.") With the reigns of his mother and eldest son, Paul's has been described by Simon M. Dixon as "the sole key to an understanding of modern Russian history".

His "despotic caprices", says scholar George Vernadsky, have overcast and distracted from the original ideas with which he began his reign. His administration made the first serious effort to limit serfdom, forbidding them to work more than three days on the same estate; (Note: This was eventually codified into the 1832 Svod Zakanov.) in some places, however (such as Ukraine, where serfs only had to work two days), this created confusion and may have increased the serfs' workload. Paul may have been mentally unstable by this time; although he apparently intended the serfs' overall lot to be improved, he made it easier for merchants to purchase them for industry. He mandated that every village install a grain bin to store supplies for the serfs against a harsh winter. (Note: However, the serfs had to contribute financially to the bins' cost, construction and grain.) Paul was the first tsar "for many generations" to legislate in favor of serfs, and this became a blueprint for his successors; after his reign, "whereas all rulers before Paul aided in intensifying the bondage of the serfs, each one thereafter made serious efforts" to help them. He forbade serfs from working on the nobility's estates on Sundays, and imposed a new tax on those estates. His edicts against serfdom were frequently disobeyed, but "proved to be the turning point" in relations between serfs and their lords; however, this was less out of a desire for social reform and more a reaction against the privileges his mother had granted their owners.

== Mental health ==
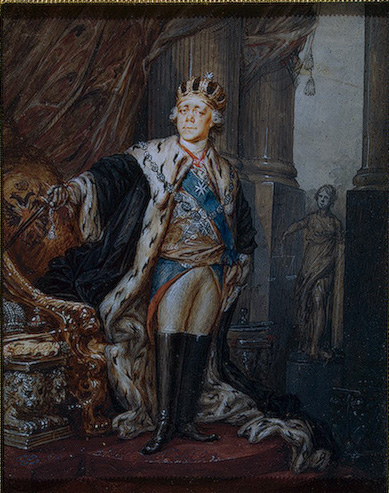
Paul wearing the crown of the Grand Master of the Order of Malta

Speculation began about Paul's mental health with his death; "many opinions can be found to the effect that he was, if not actually insane, then at the very least seriously disturbed", From "this distance, it is, of course, impossible to offer a diagnosis of Paul's problems with any certainty", but Esdaile called them a severe obsessive–compulsive disorder. Insanity has a specific legal and medical meaning, however, particularly in a criminal court. Before OCD and similar conditions were understood, it was suggested that epilepsy might have caused his instability. Paul may have been insane, but "there was a method in his madness" in reaffirming an autocracy of the imperial crown which was continued and strengthened by his successors.

Professor Baron Michel Alexsandrovitch de Taube called him an enigmatic ruler capable of the bizarre (referring to his 1798 claim to the grand mastership of the Knights of Malta). Despite a reign characterized by "some remarkable spastic impulses", Kuckov disputes that Paul was insane; Paul offended so many interest groups, however, that it was a common accusation to make. Esdaile agrees that Paul may have had OCD, but Stone says that "diagnosing mental disorders in historical figures is a dangerous enterprise". It was to the advantage of 19th-century Russian monarchists to emphasize Paul's mental instability to justify Alexander's accession, and the Romanov dynasty as a whole. Instability would account for aspects of his personality such as rigidity, inhibitions, over-conscientiousness and an inability to relax. (Note: Psychologist Mary Spiegel said that this should not be exaggerated: "Most of us have obsessional traits and lead an obsessional way of life; we are preoccupied with clock time and with problems of order and orderliness in our paper subculture ... At their best, the operation of these values gets things done, particularly the routine ones, and makes the world move more smoothly—so to speak, the trains run on time.") According to MacKenzie and Curran, Paul was probably psychotic. Russian scholar Ivar Spector wrote that as a result of his upbringing, Paul was "so physically and mentally broken that many of his contemporaries, as well as later historians, believed him to have been insane".

Duke said that Paul had psychological issues which "made him mad according to some analysts". As a result, "there has been some interesting work on his mental make-up"; V. H. Chizh's 1907 study concluded that Paul was not mentally ill. McGrew agreed that he was politically incompetent and tyrannous, rather than insane. Atkin said that Paul's invasion of India, which has been used as an example of his poor judgment, should be seen differently: "The issue of his mental state, however, will have to be decided based on other evidence. The assumption that his Indian ambitions were mad tells us far more about the double standard". (Note: She notes that Napoleon harboured a similar ambition, seen in him as positive and not insanity.)

At least one contemporary, Baron Andrei Lvovich Nicolai, considered that it was not Paul who was mentally ill "but his government intolerable". Ragsdale wrote that Paul's behavior is suggestive of several mental conditions understood in the 21st century (such as paranoia, obsessive-compulsive disorder, hysterical neurosis, and schizophrenia), but none definitively so. According to the lights of the time, if he had been insane he would have been received the same relatively-humane treatment that his distant cousins and fellow European sovereigns George III, Maria I of Portugal and Christian VII of Denmark did. According to scholar Ole Feldbæk, "In works on Paul I the authors have—sometimes implicitly, but mostly explicitly—expressed their opinion as to whether Paul was mentally unstable or not, and whether his actions were irrational or rational. Paul, I may have been mentally unstable, and he may not. And he may have been exhibiting signs of mental instability during the last period of his reign only."
