= Tuttle (M*A*S*H) =

- M*A*S*H episode
- Episode no.: Season 1 Episode 15
- Directed by: William Wiard
- Written by: Bruce Shelly; David Ketchum
- Production code: J315
- Original air date: January 14, 1973

Guest appearances
- Dennis Fimple; Mary-Robin Redd; James Sikking; Herb Voland

Episode chronology
| ← Previous "Love Story" | Next → "The Ringbanger" |
- M*A*S*H season 1

"Tuttle" is the 15th episode of the television series M*A*S*H. It was first broadcast on January 14, 1973. It was written by Bruce Shelly and David Ketchum and directed by William Wiard. This episode was nominated for a Writers Guild Award.

Guest cast is Dennis Fimple as Sergeant "Sparky" Pryor, Mary-Robin Redd as Sister Theresa, Herb Voland as Brigadier General Crandell Clayton, and James Sikking as a finance officer.

== Plot ==
To create a way of diverting camp supplies to the local orphanage, Hawkeye and Trapper invent the fictional 'Captain Tuttle' (based on Hawkeye's imaginary friend from childhood). With Radar's help, the doctors add more layers to their creation, even slipping a fake personnel file into the camp records, and the deception slowly grows until nearly everyone at the 4077th believes Tuttle is a real person. The situation ultimately climaxes when they obtain 14 months' worth of back pay owed to Tuttle and donate both this money and his future pay to the orphanage. However, matters threaten to spiral out of control when General Clayton decides to award Tuttle a medal for his actions. Hawkeye solves the problem by faking Tuttle's death, stating that he had heroically jumped into a combat zone without his parachute, and says that Tuttle had named the orphanage as the sole beneficiary of his GI insurance. Henry sadly remarks, "He was the best damn OD [Officer of the Day] we ever had!"

As the episode ends, the Swampmen joke with each other about the source of Tuttle's dog tags: the equally fictional Major Murdock.

Captain Tuttle is a parody of Lieutenant Kijé, the subject of a novella by Soviet author Yury Tynyanov. Kijé, who existed only on paper, was supposedly a soldier in the Czar's army. As with Captain Tuttle, the paperwork edifice begins to collapse when Lieutenant Kijé must make a personal appearance. The novella was made into a film, famous for its music by Sergei Prokofiev.

This is the only episode of the series in which the normally unseen character of Sparky actually appears.

In the closing credits, "Captain Tuttle" is credited as playing himself.
