= The Simultaneous Man =

1970 novel by Ralph Blum

- First edition (publ. Little, Brown); Cover artist: Wendell Minor
- Author: Ralph Blum
- Language: English
- Publication date: 1970

The Simultaneous Man is a 1970 science fiction novel by Ralph Blum, where brainwashing and psychosurgery techniques are used to create a copy of the experiences and memories of one person in the body of another.

== Plot summary ==
The book's protagonist is Andrew Horne (nicknamed "Bear"), a Russian-born U.S. scientist, who works at "West Wing" on Project Beta, a secret government mind-control project, which aims to perfect the art of brainwashing until it is possible to completely re-make a person's mind and soul. The Project operates on hopeless cases from psychiatric wards, and "prison-volunteers" who would otherwise be executed.

The Project's first Remake having failed disastrously, it is decided to base the second Remake on the mind of Horne himself. The prison-volunteer chosen for the Remake is a Black soldier, now referred to as Prisvol 233/234, who has killed an officer and been sentenced to death. The project first uses ultrasound to destroy his access to his old memories, and then, having washed the slate clean, exposes him to immersive movie reenactments of Horne's childhood, college days, war service, and entry into the Project. (As this is performed, the reader discovers that Horne himself was on the receiving end of torture and brainwashing in the Korean War, which he fought against by creating a "false self" which he betrays to the enemy, the "Lieutenant Kijé defense"). At the end of the process, 233/234, now known as "Black Bear", is, for all intents and purposes, Andrew Horne in a new body.

However, when Security realizes that Black Bear also has all of Horne's secret knowledge and considers him a security risk, it sets off a chain of events where their mirror image identities will lead both Black Bear and Horne to "East Wing" in Russia.

== See also ==
- The Manchurian Candidate
