= In the Days of Struggle =

1920 film

- Directed by: Ivane Perestiani
- Written by: Ivane Perestiani
- Cinematography: Nikolai Kozlovsky
- Release date: 1920
- Country: Russian Soviet Federative Socialist Republic (Soviet Union)
- Languages: Silent; Russian intertitles

In the Days of Struggle (Russian: В дни борьбы, romanized: V dni borbi) is a 1920 Soviet Russia silent film directed by Ivane Perestiani. It was an early acting role for actor-director Vsevolod Pudovkin as a Red Army officer. The film is considered lost.

== Cast ==
- Andrei Gorchilin
- Vsevolod Pudovkin
- Nina Shaternikova
- Feofan Shipulinsky

== Bibliography ==
- Sargeant, Amy. Vsevolod Pudovkin: Classic Films of the Soviet Avant-garde. I.B.Tauris, 2001.
