= The Ringbanger =

- M*A*S*H episode
- Episode no.: Season 1 Episode 16
- Directed by: Jackie Cooper
- Written by: Jerry Mayer
- Production code: J316
- Original air date: January 21, 1973

Guest appearances
- Leslie Nielsen; Linda Meiklejohn

Episode chronology
← Previous "Tuttle"	Next → "Sometimes You Hear the Bullet"
- M*A*S*H season 1

"The Ringbanger" is the 16th episode of the first season of the TV series M*A*S*H. It originally aired on January 21, 1973 on CBS.

In this episode, Hawkeye and Trapper try to have Colonel Buzz Brighton (Leslie Nielsen), an officer with a high casualty record, sent back to America by convincing him that he is insane.

== Plot ==
Hawkeye and Trapper conspire to take down Colonel Buzz Brighton, a West Pointer who has accumulated twice as many casualties while only gaining half as much ground as other commanders. (This was the first of several such attempts by Hawkeye.) In an effort to have the colonel relieved of command, they convince him that Frank Burns is a homosexual and that Henry Blake is an alcoholic who is having a sordid affair with the promiscuous Margaret Houlihan.

These stories achieve the purpose of rendering Hawkeye and Trapper the only two people in camp Buzz can be sure are trustworthy. A little manipulation and some conveniently timed events add some apparent proof to these claims. For example, when Buzz is drinking with them in the Swamp, they leave a pair of gold high-heeled shoes by Frank's bed. Later, Frank tries to check Buzz's leg to see if it is healing properly, and he is rebuffed by Buzz, who suspects that he has romantic or sexual intentions.

When Margaret becomes suspicious, Hawkeye and Trapper tell her that Buzz is suffering from low self-esteem and hint that he needs intimate contact with a woman to prove he is still a man. While he is alone with Margaret, Hawkeye and Trapper get Henry Blake very drunk, give him a pistol (telling him that he needs to take a firearms qualification test), arrange for him to walk in on Buzz and Margaret, and encourage an angry, drunken response from Henry.

Throughout the episode, they undertake more subtle measures to try to convince him that, among these people he cannot trust, he is going mad. Such measures include switching his tent, leaving him confused about whether it has been there the whole time; and telling him to drink his glass of milk that he so fervently asked for despite his never having asked for a glass of milk. Finally, convinced that there must be something wrong with him, Buzz is shipped back stateside.

In this episode's tag, Hawkeye makes a reference to "the Dick Haymes look." Haymes was a handsome pop singer in the 1940s and '50s, primarily remembered today for his appearance in the 1945 film musical State Fair.

== Themes and criticism ==
In Watching M*A*S*H, Watching America, a sociological examination of the TV series M*A*S*H as an illustration of shifting American values in the 1970s and early 1980s, James H. Wittebols notes the negative treatment of homosexuality in this episode (as Hawkeye convinces Brighton that Frank is gay and sexually interested in him). Wittebols also cites this episode as an example of M*A*S*H using overly gung-ho officers as a way to criticize militarism.

The term "ringbanger" is a corruption of the U.S. military term ringknocker. This is a pejorative term used in the U.S. military, frequently by officers who are not graduates of the federal service academies, to describe graduates of West Point, Annapolis, and Colorado Springs who play on their academy connections for assignments and advancement, convinced that their status as graduates and members of the regular military establishment marks them as superior to graduates of other military academies like the Citadel, Norwich, VMI, Virginia Tech, and Texas A&M; reservists; and mustangs. Here, the term is given a literal meaning, as Buzz taps his class ring on his chair's armrest to tacitly let Hawkeye and Trapper know that "he's a quarterback in this war and (they are) just water boys."
