= Lace (1928 film) =

1928 film

- Directed by: Sergei Yutkevich
- Written by: Yuri Gromov; Mark Kolosov; Vladimir Legoshin; Vladimir Mayakovsky; Sergei Yutkevich
- Cinematography: Yevgeni Shneider
- Production company: Sovkino
- Release date: 1 June 1928
- Running time: 75 minutes
- Country: Soviet Union
- Languages: Silent; Russian intertitles

Lace (Russian: Кружева, romanized: Kruzheva) is a 1928 Soviet silent film directed by Sergei Yutkevich and starring Nina Shaternikova, Konstantin Gradopolov and Boris Tenin. The film is based on the story "Wall-news" (Russian: Стенгаз, romanized: Stengaz) written by Mark Kolosov.

== Plot ==
Komsomol members of a lace factory release their own wall newspaper. Senka the artist draws caricatures of local hooligans, the leader of whom is Petya Vesnukhin. Activist Marusya tries to get Petya out of bad company.

== Cast ==
- Nina Shaternikova as Marusya
- Konstantin Gradopolov as Petka Vesnukhin
- Boris Tenin as Club manager
- Pyotr Savin as Vaska
- A. Shushkin as Senka
- N. Mass as Ganya
- D. Maloletnov
- I. Kaznenkov as Blacksmith
- Boris Poslavsky as The fellow with the guitar
- Fyodor Brest as Boy
- V. Bugayev as Boy
- Espe I. as Watchwoman
- Konstantin Nazarenko as Boy
- Konstantin Rodendorf as Boy

== Bibliography ==
- Christie, Ian & Taylor, Richard. The Film Factory: Russian and Soviet Cinema in Documents 1896-1939. Routledge, 2012.
