= Nina Shaternikova =

Soviet actress (1902–1982)

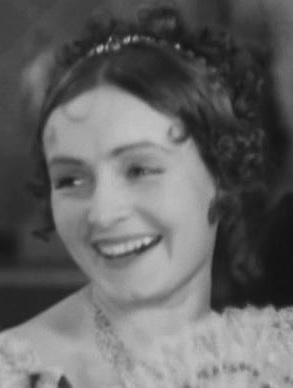
Shaternikova as princess Hellen in Young Pushkin (1936)

Nina Yakovlevna Shaternikova (Russian: Нина Яковлевна Шатерникова; 29 May 1902, Moscow – 27 November 1982, Moscow) was a Soviet stage and film actress.

== Life ==
Her first film role was in the 1919 In the Days of Struggle. She graduated from the Gerasimov Institute of Cinematography in 1923 and then from the Lenfilm actors' studio under Boris Sohn in 1936. She performed in the Leningrad Comedy Theatre from 1937 to 1941 and the National Film Actors' Theatre company from 1945. She died in 1982 and is buried in Moscow at the Vvedenskoye Cemetery.

Shaternikova was married to Sergei Yutkevich, the director of Lace, which she starred in.

== Selected filmography ==
- In the Days of Struggle (1919)
- The Iron Heel (1919)
- Comedienne (1923)
- Lace (1928)
- Lieutenant Kijé (1934)
- Young Pushkin (1937)
- Professor Mamlock (1938)
- The Court of Honor (1948)
- They Have a Motherland (1949)
