= Valentin Litovsky =

Soviet actor (1921–1941)

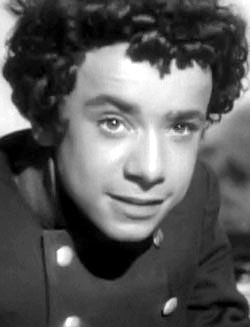
Litovsky as Pushkin

Valentin Osafovich Litovsky (Russian: Валентин Осафович Литовский; 1921, Moscow – 1941, Minsk) was a Soviet actor, starred in the film Young Pushkin. Son of writer Osaf Litovsky.

== Biography ==
He studied at the Moscow school No. 167, later No. 1113.

The actor, who starred in a role — young Alexander Pushkin in movie Young Pushkin, staged by director Abram Naroditsky at the studio Lenfilm in 1936, the centenary of the poet's death.

Valentin wanted to enter the GITIS to become a director, but these plans were interrupted by the war. October 23, 1939 was called Sverdlovsk RVC (Moscow Oblast, Moscow, Sverdlovsk District). In July (according to other sources — in October) 1941, it cuts short the life of the actor in the theater of military operations of World War II, near Minsk.
