= Young Pushkin =

- Ukrainian movie poster
- Directed by: Abram Naroditsky
- Written by: Alexander Slonimsky
- Cinematography: Apollinari Dudko; Aleksandr Sigaev
- Music by: Yuri Kochurov
- Production company: Lenfilm Studio
- Release date: 10 February 1937
- Running time: 85 minutes
- Country: Soviet Union
- Language: Russian

Young Pushkin Russian: Юность поэта, romanized: Yunost poeta is a 1937 Soviet biopic film directed by Abram Naroditsky. It portrays the youth of the Russian poet Alexander Pushkin.

== Cast ==
- Valentin Litovsky as Alexander Pushkin
- L. Mazin as Sergey Komovsky
- Yan Paramonov as Wilhelm Küchelbecker
- Alexander Muruzin as Ivan Pushchin
- Konstantin Smirnov as Mikhail Yakovlev
- Oleg Lipkin as Anton Delvig
- Cheslav Sushkevich as Alexander Gorchakov
- Vladimir Gardin as Mayer, the tutor
- Valentina Ivashova as Natasha
- Nina Shaternikova as Princess
- Alexander Mgebrov as Gavrila Derzhavin, the poet
- Ippolit Novskiy as Count Razumovsky, the Minister of Education
- Alexander Gromov as Foma
- Valentin Yantsat as Alexander Petrovich Kunitsyn, Professor of Law
- Emil Gal as De-Boudrie
- Georgy Kranert as Alexander I of Russia
- Sergey Karnovich-Valois as Aleksey Arakcheyev

== Bibliography ==
- Kevin Bartig. Composing for the Red Screen: Prokofiev and Soviet Film. Oxford University Press, 2013.
