= Lieutenant Kijé (Prokofiev) =

1934 film music and orchestral suite

- Film music and orchestral suite by Sergei Prokofiev
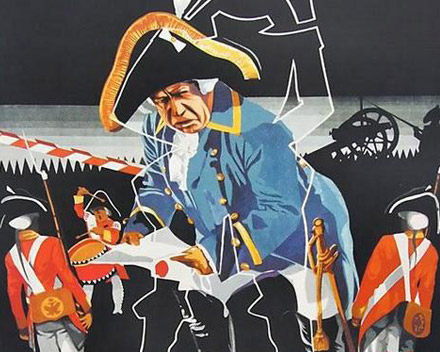
- From the film advertising poster
- Opus: (suite) 60
- Composed: 1933–1934
- Duration: (suite) approx. 20 minutes

Premiere
- Date: (suite) 21 December 1934
- Location: Paris
- Conductor: Sergei Prokofiev

Sergei Prokofiev's Lieutenant Kijé (Russian: Поручик Киже, Poruchik Kizhe) music was originally written to accompany the film of the same name, produced by the Belgoskino film studios in Leningrad in 1933–34 and released in March 1934. It was Prokofiev's first attempt at film music, and his first commission.

In the early days of sound cinema, among the various distinguished composers ready to try their hand at film music, Prokofiev was not an obvious choice for the commission. Based in Paris for almost a decade, he had a reputation for experimentation and dissonance, characteristics at odds with the cultural norms of the Soviet Union. By early 1933, however, Prokofiev was anxious to return to his homeland, and saw the film commission as an opportunity to write music in a more popular and accessible style.

After the film's successful release, the five-movement Kijé suite was first performed in December 1934, and quickly became part of the international concert repertoire. It has remained one of the composer's best-known and most frequently recorded works. Elements of the suite's score have been used in several later films, and in two popular songs of the Cold War era.

== Background ==
=== Expatriate composer ===
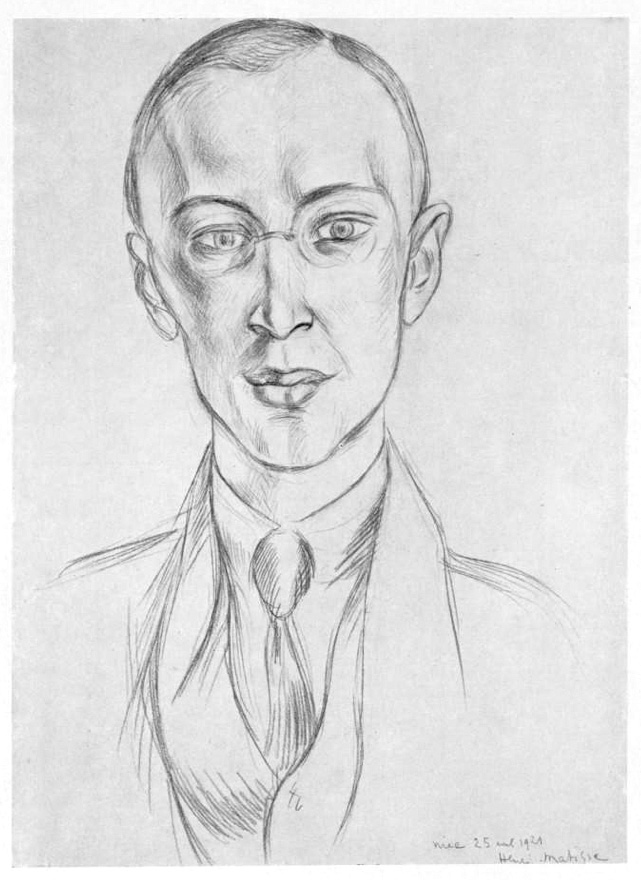
Prokofiev in 1921, drawn by Henri Matisse

Sergei Prokofiev graduated from the Saint Petersburg Conservatory in 1914, having by then acquired an early reputation as an avant-garde composer. His biographer Israel Nestyev asserts that the Second Piano Concerto of 1913 was "Prokofiev's ticket of admission to the highest circles of Russian modernism".

When the First World War broke out in August 1914, Prokofiev avoided military service, possibly because he was the only son of a widow. During the war years he continued to compose; in May 1918, in the period of upheaval following the October Revolution and the beginning of the Civil War, Prokofiev obtained permission from the Bolshevik government to travel abroad, and left for America. His biographers have maintained that he did not "flee the country"; rather that he embarked on a concert tour, which he extended when he became convinced that his career prospects would be better served in America and western Europe. He remained in America until March 1922; he then stayed briefly in the small German town of Ettal before moving to Paris in October 1923.

Rather than treating Prokofiev as a fugitive or exile, the Moscow government chose to consider him as a general ambassador for Soviet culture, and the composer returned the compliment by registering in France as a citizen of the Soviet Union, the new state formed on 30 December 1922 by Russia and the states of the former Russian Empire. Prokofiev expressed support for the political developments in what he still considered his homeland, and was keen to resume contacts there. He was accorded VIP status when he paid his first visit to the Soviet Union in 1927, for a recital tour. Further trips followed, and in 1930 Prokofiev took a flat in Moscow, although Paris remained his principal home. During this period of rapprochement he consciously sought to simplify his musical language into a form that he believed would be consistent with the official Soviet concept of art.

=== Growth of film music ===
In the first years of the silent film era, from the 1890s, films were generally accompanied by live music, often improvised, provided by piano or pump organ. In the early 20th century, larger cinemas began to use orchestras, which would accompany the film with out-of-copyright classical pieces or, increasingly, with original compositions. The score for the 1916 classic The Birth of a Nation, compiled by Joseph Carl Breil from various classical works and some original writing, was a landmark in film music, and inspired notable composers of the day to provide scores for silent films. Among these were the Americans Victor Herbert and Mortimer Wilson, from France Darius Milhaud and Arthur Honegger, and the Germans Gottfried Huppertz and Edmund Meisel.

In 1927 developments in sound technology brought the arrival of "talking pictures". In these, accompanying music was originally recorded on a disc, separately from the film images, but within two years the "Movietone" system enabled sound to be captured on the film itself. Music could now be aligned specifically with the film's on-screen action—the so-called "diegetic" approach. Early pioneers of this method were the Germans Friedrich Hollaender and Karol Rathaus, who provided the music for The Blue Angel (1930) and The Murderer Dimitri Karamazov (1931) respectively. By this time in the Soviet Union, the young Dmitri Shostakovich had already begun his prolific career as a composer of film sound-tracks, with The New Babylon in 1929 and Alone in 1931.

When planning their proposed film Lieutenant Kijé in 1932, the Belgoskino studios of Leningrad (Note: The Belgoskino studios moved to Minsk in 1938, and were renamed Belarusfilm.) asked the expatriate Prokofiev to write the accompanying music. In some respects Prokofiev was a surprising choice; he was at this stage better known abroad than in the Soviet Union, and had acquired a reputation for dissonance. Moreover, his ballet Le pas d'acier had fared badly at Moscow's Bolshoi Theatre in 1929. The composer's first response was to refuse the commission; a member of the production team recalled that Prokofiev "categorically rejected my proposal. His time was scheduled far into the future, he had never written music for film and he didn't know 'what kind of sauce' to put on it." But, attracted by the story, Prokofiev quickly changed his mind and accepted, seeing this first venture into film music as an opportunity to demonstrate his ability to appeal to a mass Soviet audience.

== 1934 film ==
=== Inception ===
Lieutenant Kijé was one of the earliest sound films made in the Soviet Union. The origin of the story was a 1927 screenplay by the critic and novelist Yury Tynyanov, written for the Soviet film director Sergei Yutkevich. This project failed, and Tynyanov recast his script into a novella that was published in January 1928. In the early 1930s, when the Belgoskino studios announced their interest in making the film, Tynyanov produced a second script. The story has been described by Prokofiev's biographer Harlow Robinson as "a satire on the stupidity of royalty and the particularly Russian terror of displeasing one's superior". By his own account Prokofiev was at this time "restive, and afraid of falling into academism"; a later critic thought the Kijé story provided ideal material for this "so-often caustic and witty composer".

=== Plot ===
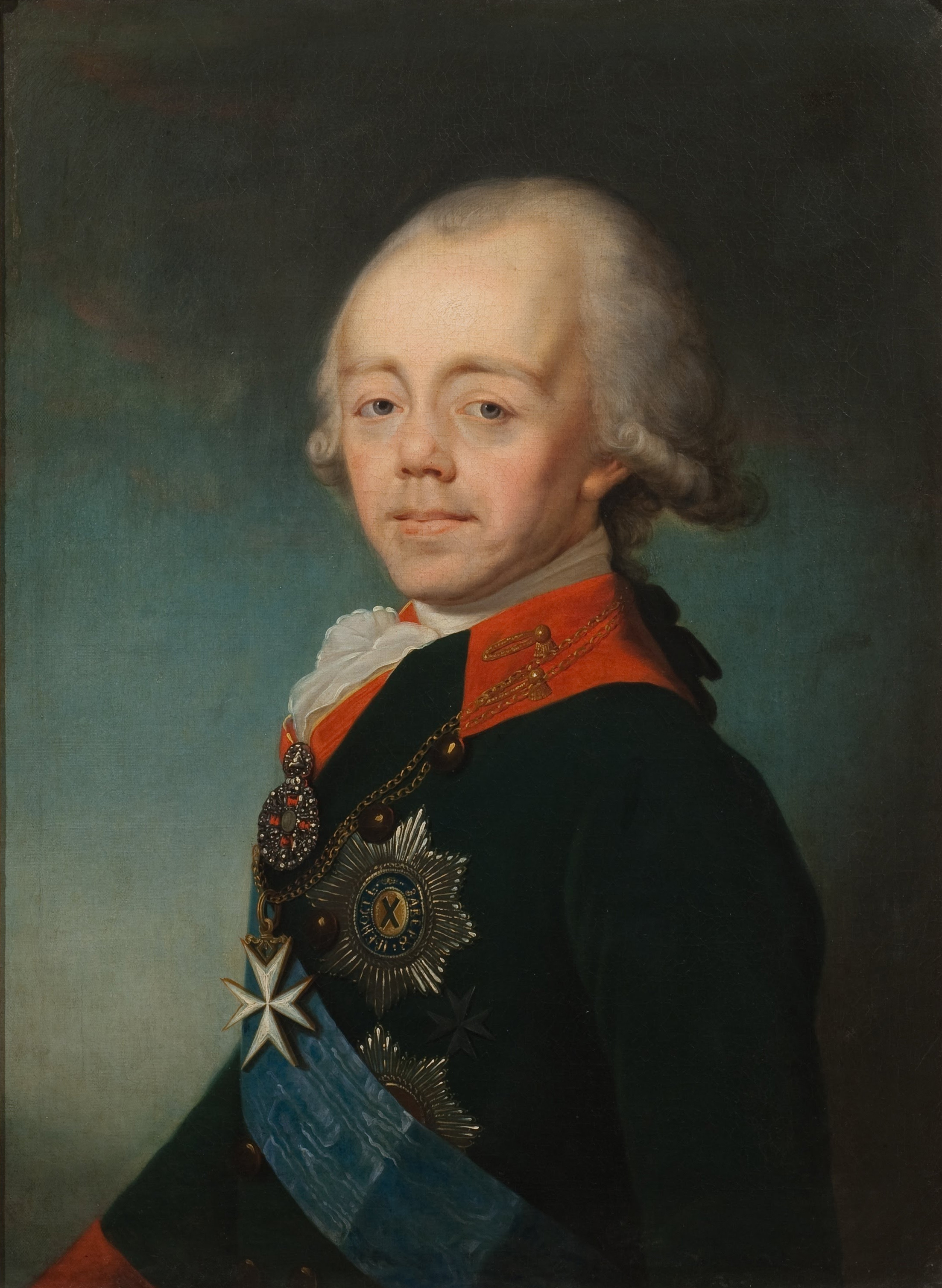
Tsar Paul I

In the Russian Imperial Palace, while Tsar Paul I sleeps, a dalliance between two courtiers ends with a shriek which wakens the tsar. Enraged, he demands that his officials produce the culprit or face banishment for life. Meanwhile, a clerk's slip of the pen while compiling a military duty roster results in the inclusion in the list of a fictitious officer, "Lieutenant Kijé". When the tsar inspects the list he is intrigued by this name, and asks that the officer be presented to him. The court officials are too terrified of the tsar to admit that a mistake has been made, and are in a dilemma until it occurs to them to blame "Kijé" for the nocturnal disturbance. They inform the tsar, who duly orders the imaginary lieutenant flogged and sent to Siberia.

When the real culprit confesses, Kijé is pardoned by the tsar and reinstated in the imperial court with the rank of colonel. The courtiers, in fear of the tsar, are forced to extend their creation's phantom career; thus, he supposedly marries the princess Gagarina, after which the tsar grants him lands and money and promotes him to general and commander of the army. When Paul demands Kijé's immediate presence, the cornered officials announce that "General Kijé" has, unfortunately, died. A lavish funeral is held, with full military honours. The parsimonious tsar demands the return of Kijé's fortune, but is told by the courtiers that Kijé has spent the money on high living—in fact, they have stolen it. The tsar denounces Kijé as a thief, and posthumously demotes him from general to private.

=== Music ===
Despite his lack of experience in composing film music, Prokofiev began his Kijé score confidently, later writing: "I somehow had no doubts whatever about the musical language for the film". He told the producers, "What is important to me is the era, the internal meaning of each event, the personality of each hero", and warned them not to expect mere musical "illustrations". He attended rehearsals and made detailed notes of the action and the acting. The period setting of the film appealed to Prokofiev; Robinson comments that the Kijé score is one of several works, including the Classical Symphony, The Love of Three Oranges, Cinderella, and War and Peace, that show "the composer's fondness for the eighteenth century". The language he chose combined elements of humour and romance with an underlying melancholy—he interpreted the story as more tragic than comic. Prokofiev had heard Ravel's Boléro in Paris, and had been much impressed by the French composer's use of the saxophone, an instrument then rarely used in orchestral compositions outside France but which suited Prokofiev's intentions perfectly. The composer Gerard McBurney has pointed out the "haunting sounds of the tenor saxophone" that punctuate the Kijé music.

The critic Ernest Chapman refers to Prokofiev's "unfailingly witty and melodious score". It comprises only about 15 minutes of music, written as a series of 16 short fragments or leitmotifs which are repeated at appropriate times during the film's duration, to highlight specific moments in the drama. This approach was a departure in film music from the established form of broad symphonic movements, and was described by Prokofiev's biographer Daniel Jaffé as "well ahead of its time ... one of the most celebrated [film scores] of that era".

=== Production and reception history ===
The film, directed by Alexander Feinzimmer, was made at the Belgoskino studios where the music was recorded under the direction of Isaak Dunayevsky. The Moscow premiere was held on 7 March 1934, after which the film was released in London as The Tsar Wants to Sleep and in Paris as Le Lieutenant Nantes. Prokofiev did not rate the film highly, although he was pleased with his music. After the New York release in December 1934, the critic for The New York Times described the film as "calculated to entertain lovers of detail and genuine atmosphere in semi-historical films. Even the introduction of a little slapstick comedy seems quite in keeping with the Russian tradition." Prokofiev's contribution to the film is not acknowledged in this review.

== Suite ==
=== Composition ===
Soon after the film's release, Prokofiev received an invitation from the Moscow Radio Symphony Orchestra to create an orchestral suite from his Kijé film music—probably the first instance of a film score being adapted into a significant musical work. The guiding light behind the invitation was Boris Gusman, the assistant director of the Bolshoi Theatre and a leading film critic. Gusman was a strong supporter of Prokofiev's ambition to rehabilitate himself in the Soviet Union, and had negotiated with the Moscow orchestra for a series of concerts that would showcase the returned composer's talent.

Prokofiev's task was not straightforward; the film's 15 minutes of musical material were fragmentary and scored for a small chamber orchestra. According to Prokofiev's own account, producing the suite was "a devilish job", which, he said, "gave me much more trouble than the music for the film itself, since I had to find the proper form, re-orchestrate the whole thing, polish it up and even combine some of the themes." He wanted the suite to appeal to Soviet audiences hearing concert music for the first time. In an article in Izvestia in 1934 he wrote of such music: "Above all, it must be melodious; moreover the melody must be simple and comprehensible without being repetitive or trivial ... The simplicity should not be an old-fashioned simplicity but a new simplicity". He worked quickly, and had finished the piece by 8 July 1934. Because it was published (Op. 60) by his regular music publisher in Paris, the French transliteration "Kijé" (rather than the American "Kizhe" or any other) was adopted in the work's title. (Note: Prokofiev did not allocate an opus number to the original film score, which he did not publish.)

=== Instrumentation ===
The Kijé suite is scored for: baritone voice (optional) (Note: In the full score, the version with the baritone solo is the original, while the version without the solo is treated as optional, with the former given the correct movement numbers, as found in the full score in the International Music Score Library Project.); piccolo; two flutes; two oboes; two clarinets; two bassoons; tenor saxophone; four horns; cornet; two trumpets; three trombones; tuba; bass drum; snare drum; triangle; cymbals; tambourine; sleigh bells; celesta; piano; harp; and strings.

=== Structure ===
The five movements of the suite are organised and titled as follows (bolded capitals identify specified themes):

==== Birth of Kijé ====
A distant, mournful fanfare (A), played on a cornet representing a bugle, is followed by a brisk military march initiated by a duet for side drum and piccolo. A passage for brass precedes the introduction of a theme or leitmotif (B) associated with the phantom Kijé which, after a reprise of the march and a C major crescendo, is repeated on tenor saxophone, an instrument relatively new to the orchestra at that time. The cornet fanfare then returns to close the movement.

==== Romance ====
The principal theme (C) for this movement is based on an old song, "The little grey dove is cooing", for which Prokofiev provided an optional part for baritone voice. The song theme is developed using a range of instruments, before giving way to a second theme introduced by the tenor saxophone; this in turn is replaced, as the movement draws to its close, with the return of the "little grey dove" tune, now ornamented by birdsong.

==== Kijé's Wedding ====
The movement begins with and is regularly visited by a broad, ceremonial and somewhat pompous melody (D), played on brass and woodwind. In between these formal-sounding statements are a cheerful cornet solo and various elaborations and variations on the Kijé theme, which together give the movement a celebratory feel, both boisterous and sentimental.

==== Troika ====
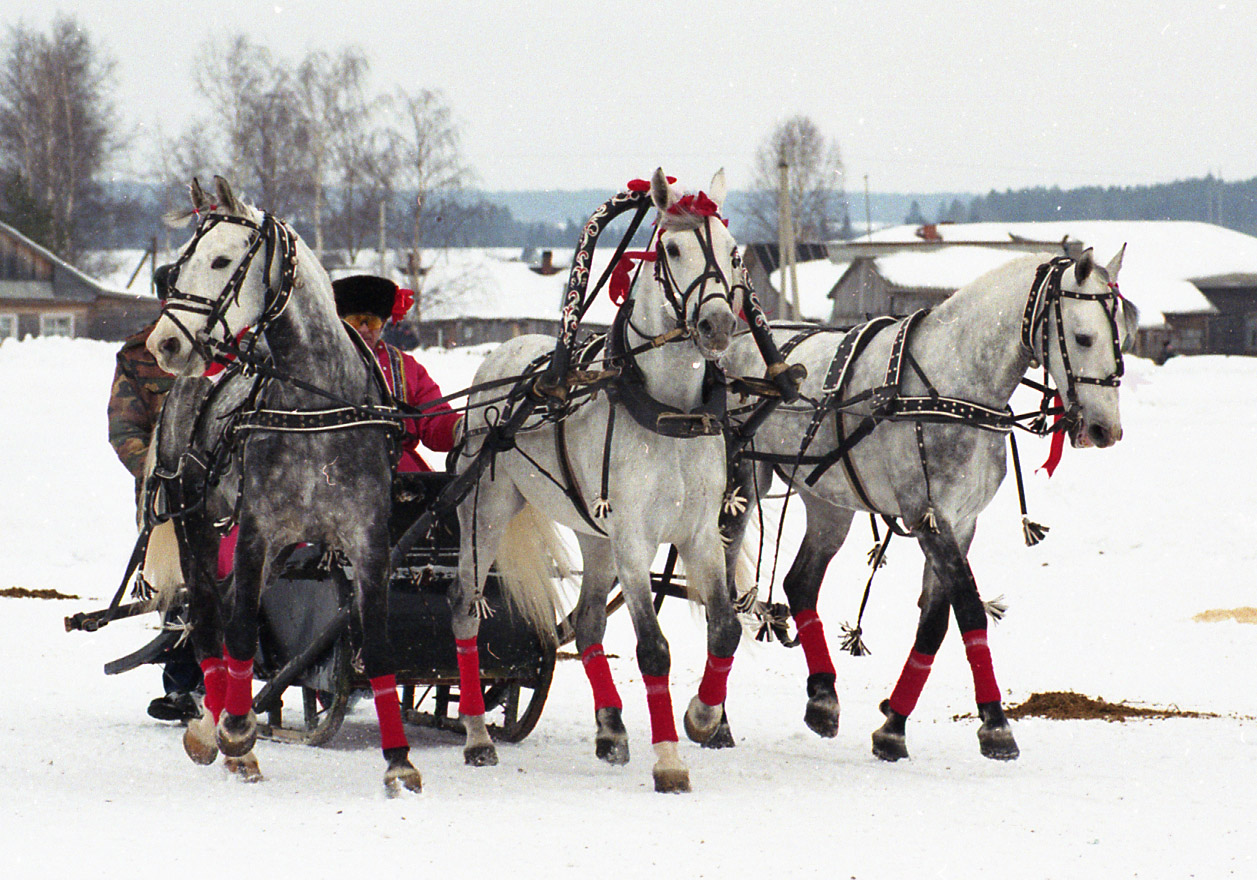
A troika, a traditional Russian sled combination

The principal melody in this movement (E) is taken from an old Hussar song, for which Prokofiev provided an optional baritone part. The melody first appears in a slow and somewhat dissonant statement, after which the pace quickens: sleigh bells, rapid pizzicato strings, and piano combine to give the impression of a fast winter's journey by means of the troika, a traditional Russian three-horse sled. The ride is accompanied at regular intervals by the song theme, which brings the movement to its close with a slow repetition of its final phrase.

==== The Burial of Kijé ====
This final movement is largely a mélange of earlier themes, a series of reminiscences of Kijé's imaginary life. The opening cornet fanfare returns, as does Kijé's leitmotif, together with "The little grey dove", this time intertwined with the wedding music. In what Orrin Howard in a programme note for the Los Angeles Philharmonic describes as "a wistful, touching farewell", the music reaches its conclusion with a distant rendition of the fanfare.

=== Themes ===
(A) Opening fanfare

(B) March

(C) Romance ("The little grey dove")

(D) Wedding

(E) Troika

=== Two Songs, Op. 60bis ===
Prokofiev arranged "The Little Grey Dove" (Romance) and "Troika" for solo voice and piano, published together as Two Songs from Lieutenant Kijé, Op. 60-bis in 1934.

=== Performance, reception and adaptation history ===
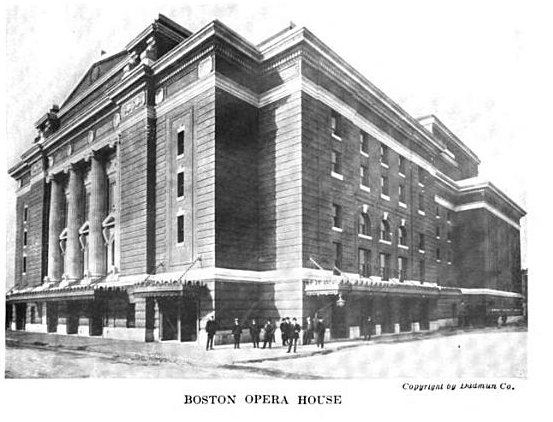
The Boston Opera House, where the 1942 ballet version was first shown

Prokofiev conducted the first performance of the suite in Paris on 21 December 1934. The piece received its American premiere on 14 October 1937, when Serge Koussevitzky conducted the Boston Symphony Orchestra; this performance formed the basis of the first commercial recording of the work, issued in the following year. While Prokofiev was in the United States for the Boston premiere he was greatly sought after by film producers, but although he was flattered and attracted by their offers he never composed a Hollywood film score.

The suite rapidly gained popularity, particularly in the US; the choreographer Michel Fokine used the music in his ballet Russian Soldier, performed at the Boston Opera House on 23 January 1942. A further ballet version, Lieutenant Kijé, was devised for Moscow's Bolshoi Ballet in 1963 by Alexander Lapauri and Olga Tarasova, with Raisa Struchkova in a leading role.

The music critic David Gutman has called the suite "[o]ne of [Prokofiev's] most popular compositions today [and] also one of the most accomplished". Robinson rates the Kijé suite among the composer's greatest compositions, alongside Romeo and Juliet and the Second Violin Concerto as "accessible, simple and melodic". In his Essential Canon of Classical Music (2001), David Dubal remarks on how the Kijé music has thrived in popular culture: "Bits and pieces are used everywhere".

Having begun life as a 1930s film soundtrack, parts of the suite began to appear in later films, such as the British The Horse's Mouth (1958) and Woody Allen's 1975 parody on Russian literature, Love and Death.

In popular music, the "Troika" movement has been adapted several times, beginning in 1952 as "Midnight Sleighride", a jazz band arrangement by Eddie Sauter and Bill Finegan. In 1975 the "Troika" tune was used extensively in Greg Lake's best-selling pop song "I Believe in Father Christmas", and the "Romance" movement formed the basis of the main theme in Sting's 1985 anti-war song "Russians".

=== Recordings ===
The 1938 performance of the suite by Koussevitsky and the Boston Symphony Orchestra, recorded on 78rpm discs, provided the only commercially available recording until the advent of the LP era in the 1950s; a broadcast performance by the Cleveland Orchestra under Fritz Reiner in December 1945 was not issued until many years later. In 1951 Westminster issued Hermann Scherchen's recording of the suite with the Vienna Symphony, since which many recordings of the work have been issued under a variety of labels.

The first stereo recording was by Reiner with the Chicago Symphony Orchestra for RCA (March 1957). A 2008 edition of the Muze survey of recordings lists 19 available versions by orchestras from Eastern and Western Europe, Asia and the US. The version with optional baritone voice has rarely found its way on to disc; Erich Leinsdorf recorded this version twice, with the Philharmonia Orchestra for EMI and with the Boston Symphony Orchestra for RCA. Vladimir Ashkenazy with the Sydney Symphony Orchestra and Andrei Laptev (2010) provide 21st-century examples. A DVD of the Bolshoi Ballet production, featuring Raisa Struchkova and Vladimir Vasiliev, was released in 2007.

== Notes and references ==
=== Sources ===
==== Books ====
- Bartig, Kevin (2013). Composing for the Red Screen: Prokofiev and Soviet Film. Oxford: Oxford University Press. ISBN 978-0-19-996759-9.
- Dubal, David (2001). The Essential Canon of Classical Music. New York: North Point Press. ISBN 978-0-86547-608-0.
- Gable, Christopher (2009). The Words and Music of Sting. Westport, Connecticut: Praeger Publishing. ISBN 978-1-57356-729-9.
- Gutman, David (1988). Prokofiev. London: Alderman. ISBN 978-0-946619-32-0.
- Harvey, Adam (2007). The Soundtracks of Woody Allen. London: McFarland & Company. ISBN 978-0-7864-2968-4.
- Jaffé, Daniel (1998). Sergey Prokofiev. London: Phaidon. ISBN 978-0-7148-3513-6.
- Lee, Douglas (2002). Masterworks of 20th Century Music: The Modern Repertory of the Symphony Orchestra. New York: Routledge. ISBN 978-0-415-93846-4.
- MacDonald, Laurence E. (2013). The Invisible Art of Film Music: A Comprehensive History. New York: The Scarecrow Press. ISBN 978-0-8108-8397-0.
- Morrison, Simon (2009). The People's Artist: Prokofiev's Soviet Years. Oxford: Oxford University Press. ISBN 978-0-19-518167-8.
- Muze classical catalogue 2008. London: Muze Europe Ltd. 2007. ISBN 978-1-900105-39-2.
- Nestyev, Israel V. (1960). Prokofiev. Stanford, California: Stanford University Press. ISBN 978-0-8047-0585-1.
- Nice, David (2003). Prokofiev: From Russia to the West, 1891–1935. New Haven, Connecticut: Yale University Press. ISBN 978-0-300-09914-0.
- Prokofiev, Sergei (1943). Lieutenant Kijé, Suite symphonique, Op. 60. New York: Broude Bros. OCLC 933094309.
- Robinson, Harlow, ed. (1987). Sergei Prokofiev: a biography. New York: Viking Press. ISBN 978-0-67080-419-1.
- Shilfstein, S., ed. (2000). Sergei Prokofiev: Autobiography, Articles, and Reminiscences. Honolulu, Hawaii: University Press of the Pacific. ISBN 978-0-89875-149-9.
- Steen, Michael (2009). The Lives of the Great Composers. London: Icon Books. ISBN 978-1-84046-679-9.
- Yampolski, Mikhail (1998). The Memory of Tiresias: Intertextuality and Film. Berkeley, California: University of California Press. ISBN 978-0-520-08529-9.

==== Newspapers, journals and audio-visual media ====
- Bartig, Kevin (May 2007). "Creating the Lieutenant Kizhe Suite". Three Oranges Journal (13): 22–26. Archived from the original on 2022-12-05.
- Chapman, Ernest (Autumn 1964). "Record Guide". Tempo (70): 26–29. doi:10.1017/S0040298200033040. JSTOR 943939. S2CID 251414502. (subscription required)
- Emerson, Carol (January 2004). "Book review: Nice, David: Prokofiev–a biography". The Russian Review. 63 (1): 155–157. JSTOR 3664707. (subscription required)
- F.F.C.; G.I.C. (Spring 1949). "Prokofieff on Records". Tempo (11): 32–34. JSTOR 944059. (subscription required)
- Gallez, Douglas W. (Spring 1978). "The Prokofiev-Eisenstein Collaboration: "Nevsky" and "Ivan" Revisited". Cinema Journal. 17 (2): 13–35. doi:10.2307/1225488. JSTOR 1225488. (subscription required)
- Hanson, Dion (July–August 1998). "The History of Sound in the Cinema" (PDF). Cinema Technology.
- McNaught, W. (January 1942). "Gramophone Notes". The Musical Times. 83 (1187): 16–17. doi:10.2307/921937. JSTOR 921937. (subscription required)
- Morgan, Kenneth (2010). The Art of Fritz Reiner, Vol 1 (Compact disc liner notes). West Hill Radio Archive.
- Myers, Kurtz (March 1952). "Index of Record Reviews". Notes. 9 (2): 265. JSTOR 890216. (subscription required)
- "Obituary: Raissa Struchkova". The Daily Telegraph. 10 May 2005.
- "Poruchik Kizhe (1934): Czar Paul on Screen Again". The New York Times. 10 December 1934. Archived from the original on 7 May 2016.

==== Online ====
- "Belarus culture". Republic of Belarus.
- Cooke, Mervyn (2001). "Film Music". Grove Music Online (8th ed.). Oxford University Press. doi:10.1093/gmo/9781561592630.article.09647. ISBN 978-1-56159-263-0. (subscription, Wikilibrary access, or UK public library membership required) (subscription required)
- Ginell, Richard S.. Directions in Music – Sauter-Finegan Orchestra at AllMusic
- Hazlewood, Charles (3 May 2014). "Discovering music. Prokofiev: Lieutenant Kijé". BBC Radio 3.
- Howard, Orrin (2015). "Lt. Kijé Suite". The Los Angeles Philharmonic. Archived from the original on 4 March 2016.
- Jaffé, Daniel (13 December 2014). "Prokofiev's score for the film Lieutenant Kijé ahead of its time". Chicago Symphony Orchestra. Archived from the original on 4 March 2016.
- Lieutenant Kijé / Le baiser de la fee. WorldCat. OCLC 608147222.
- McBurney, Gerard (2015). "Prokofieff, Serge: Lieutenant Kijé, Op. 60 – Suite (1934)". Boosey & Hawkes.
- Prokofiev, S.: Lieutenant Kijé Suite / The Love For Three Oranges Suite / The Ugly Duckling (Porter, Laptev, Sydney Symphony, Ashkenazy). WorldCat. OCLC 919578123.
- Redepenning, Dorothea (2001). "Prokofiev, Sergey (Sergeyevich): USA, 1918–22". Grove Music Online. (subscription required)
- Redepenning, Dorothea (2001). "Prokofiev, Sergey (Sergeyevich): Europe, 1922–36". Grove Music Online. (subscription required)
- Redepenning, Dorothea (2001). "Prokofiev, Sergey (Sergeyevich): Contacts with the Soviet Union". Grove Music Online. (subscription required)
- "Review (Shostakovich)". Southern Illinois University, Edwardsville.
- "Russian Soldier". Ballet Theatre Foundation, Inc. Archived from the original on 28 March 2016.
- Steinberg, Michael (October 2015). "Prokofiev: Lieutenant Kijé Suite, Opus 60". San Francisco Symphony. Archived from the original on 16 August 2016.
- "This Day in History". History.com. 24 November 2009.
