= Lieutenant Kijé =

Fictional character

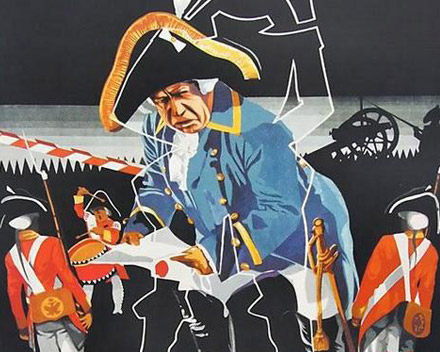
A 1934 poster advertising the Soviet film about Lieutenant Kijé.

Lieutenant Kijé or Kizhe (Russian: Пору́чик Киже́, romanized: Poruchik Kizhe), originally Kizh (Киж), is a fictional character in an anecdote about the reign of Emperor Paul I of Russia, in which the cover-up of a transcription error leads to the creation of a fictional soldier, Kijé, and his rise through the ranks. When Paul asks to meet the now renowned officer, the creators of the hoax are cornered into a final lie that the soldier has died in battle. The story was used as the basis of a novella by Yury Tynyanov published in 1928 and filmed in 1934 with music by Sergei Prokofiev. The plot is a satire on bureaucracy.

== Original version ==
The first appearance of the anecdote is in Vladimir Dahl's "Stories of the time of Paul I" (Russian: Рассказы о временах Павла I), a short piece published in the journal Russkaya Starina in 1870; he reported it as told by his father, Johan Christian von Dahl (1764-1821). In this original version, a clerk miswrites an order promoting several ensigns (praporshchiki) to second lieutenants (podporuchiki): instead of "praporshchiki zh ... - v podporuchiki " ("as to Ensigns (names), [they are promoted to] Second Lieutenants"), he writes "praporshchik Kizh, ... - v podporuchiki " ("Ensign Kizh, (other names) [are promoted to] Second Lieutenants"). The Emperor Paul decides to promote the nonexistent Kizh to first lieutenant (poruchik); he quickly rises through the ranks to staff captain and full captain, and when he is promoted to colonel the emperor commands that Kizh appear before him. Of course no Kizh can be found; the military bureaucrats go through the paper trail and discover the original mistake, but they decide to tell the emperor that Kizh has died. "What a pity," the Emperor says, "he was a good officer."

== Tynyanov version ==
Yury Tynyanov, who had been researching the period for his historical novels Kyukhlya (1925) and Smert Vazir-mukhtara (The death of the ambassador plenipotentiary, 1928), wrote a novella based on Dahl's story that was published in 1928 in Krasnaya Nov No.1. He considerably expanded it, adding several characters (including the historical statesman Aleksey Arakcheyev), and changed the imaginary officer's name from Kizh to Kizhe (using an alternative form of the particle, zhe). In his version, along with the imaginary Kizhe there is another mistake: a Lieutenant Sinyukhaev is wrongly marked as dead. Several sections of the novella are devoted to Sinyukhaev's fruitless attempts to get himself restored (he ends up wandering the roads of Russia, living on the charity of strangers).

Tynyanov further complicates the story by adding a lady-in-waiting who has had a brief affair with an officer who shouts "Guard!" in the courtyard, disturbing the Emperor; when the offender cannot be found, the emperor Paul is told that it was Kizhe, who is accordingly said to be flogged and sent to Siberia (the fact that no actual person is there does not seem to bother anyone). This upsets the lady-in-waiting, but when the emperor changes his mind and has Kizhe returned to the capital and promoted, the lady-in-waiting is able to marry him (there is no groom at the ceremony but it proceeds as scheduled, and she has a child from her brief encounter), and she quite happily lives in his quarters, carrying on affairs, while he is supposedly in the field with his regiment. In the end the emperor, increasingly paranoid and lonely, feels the need to have someone as dependable as Kizhe (who has had a spotless career) near him, promotes him to general, and orders him brought to his palace in Saint Petersburg. Since this is impossible, he is told that Kizhe has died, and the general has a state funeral as the grieving emperor says "Sic transit gloria mundi." The last line of the story reads "And Pavel Petrovich [the emperor Paul] died in March of the same year as General Kizhe — according to official reports, from apoplexy." (In fact, Paul was murdered by a group of dismissed officers, but the royal physician did pronounce it apoplexy.)

== Film ==
The story was made into the 1934 film Lieutenant Kijé, directed by Aleksandr Faintsimmer, which is now remembered primarily for its soundtrack, the first instance of the composer Prokofiev's "new simplicity".

== Parody ==
The story is often parodied in fictional works making fun of bureaucracies, most famously in the form of the M*A*S*H episode "Tuttle", featuring a fictional captain of similar provenance.

== Spelling ==
The conventional romanization of the title is Kizhé (Киже). The usual spelling Kijé corresponds to French pronunciation (IPA: ⟨ʑ⟩), but in many other languages, such as English, German and Spanish, this French spelling often leads to mispronunciation. The Ж sound is a voiced "sh", and sounds like the s in "measure" when said by a speaker of English. (The Russian actor Igor Zhizhikin (Игорь Жижикин) also uses the French transliteration, Jijikine, for his name, leading to similar mispronunciation.)
