= Lieutenant Kijé (film) =

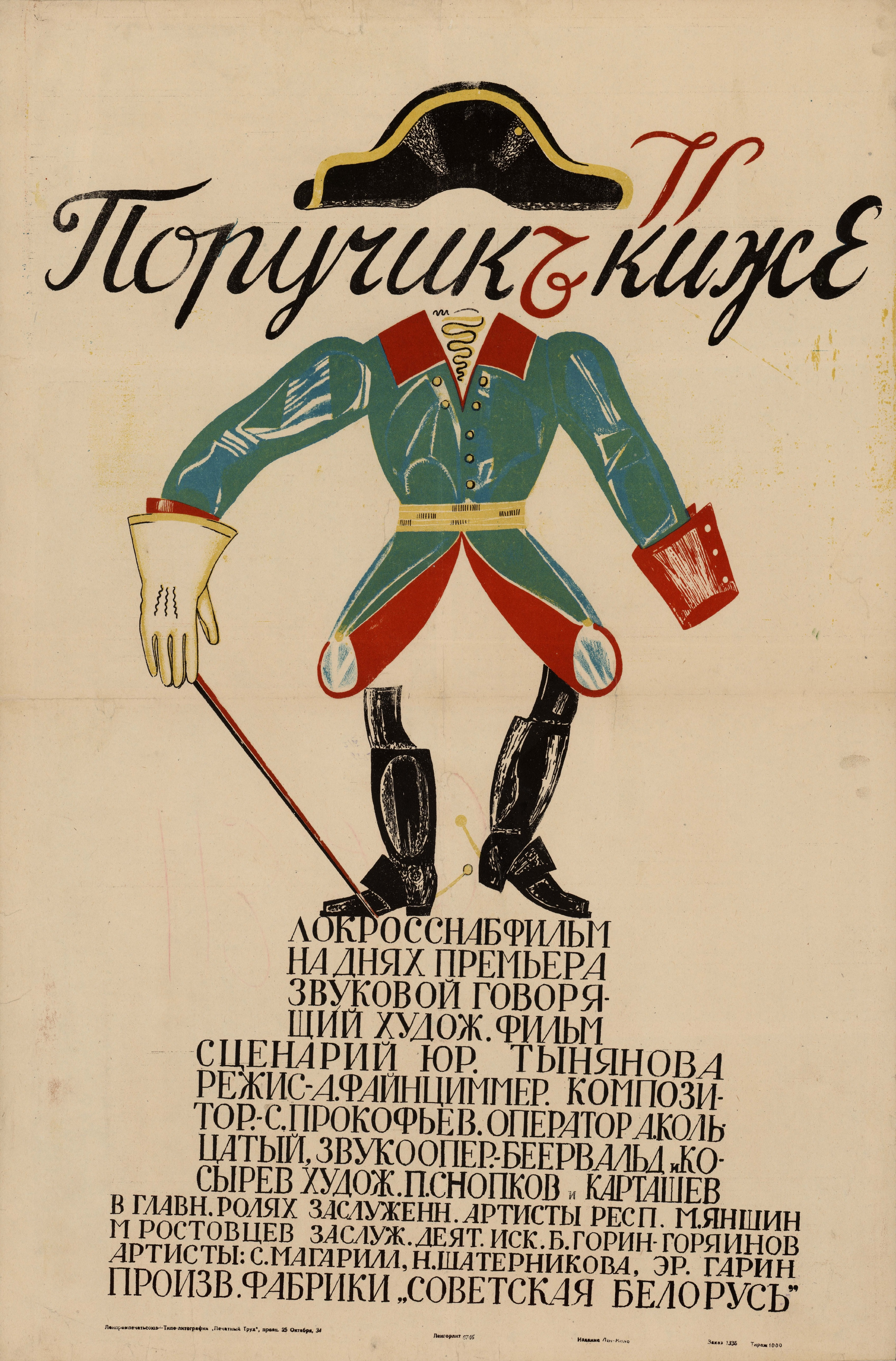
- Film poster
- Directed by: Aleksandr Faintsimmer
- Written by: Yury Tynyanov
- Starring: Mikhail Yanshin
- Cinematography: Arkadi Koltsaty
- Music by: Sergei Prokofiev
- Production company: Belgoskino
- Release date: 9 December 1934
- Running time: 87 minutes
- Country: Soviet Union
- Language: Russian

Lieutenant Kijé (Russian: Поручик Киже, romanized: Poruchik Kizhe) is a 1934 Soviet comedy film directed by Aleksandr Faintsimmer and promoted by Boris Gusman, based on the novella "Lieutenant Kijé" by Yury Tynyanov. The film was released in the United States as The Czar Wants to Sleep. Sergei Prokofiev composed the score; a five-movement suite based on the score quickly became part of the international concert repertoire.

== Plot ==
Set in Saint Petersburg in 1800, the film satirizes the showy absurdities of the rule of Emperor Paul I. His obsession with rigid drill, instant obedience and martinet discipline extends not only to his soldiers but also to his courtiers and even the servants who scrub the palace corridors. A slip of the pen by an army clerk, when drawing up a list of officers for promotion, leads to the creation of a Lieutenant Kijé. Once the document is signed by the Emperor, Kijé takes on an existence of his own. The Emperor's aide cries out when engaged in amorous play with Princess Gagarina's companion, awakening the sleeping Paul. The non-existent Lieutenant Kijé is blamed, flogged in front of the assembled Imperial Guard and sent under escort to a fortress in Siberia. His lack of physical form is explained by his being "a confidential prisoner with no shape". Reprieved by the Emperor at the request of Princess Gagarina, Kijé returns to Saint Petersburg and is rapidly promoted to colonel and then general. In absentia, he marries the lady in waiting. At last, when the Emperor insists on a meeting with his "most faithful servant", General Kijé is reported as having died. The Czar orders a state funeral, not knowing the coffin is empty.

In an ironic twist ending, the Emperor is made to believe that his favorite officer was an embezzler after a note reading "General Kijé spent the money on meals" (deliberately left by the Emperor's aide) is found in the empty state treasury chest. The furious Paul then remembers that it was Kijé who originally disturbed his sleep. The "deceased" is demoted to the rank of private and the Emperor's aide is promoted to the rank of general, embracing Princess Gagarina's companion after the funeral for her disgraced husband is canceled.

== Cast ==
- Mikhail Yanshin as Tsar Pavel I
- Boris Gorin-Goryainov as Count von Pahlen
- Nina Shaternikova as Princess Gagarina
- Sofiya Magarill as Princess Gagarina's companion
- Erast Garin as Adjutant Koblukov
- Mikhail Rostovtsev as Fortress commandant
- Leonid Kmit as Army scribe (uncredited)
- Andrei Kostrichkin as Lieutenant Sinyukhaev (uncredited)
