= Yury Tynyanov =

Soviet writer (1894–1943)

- Ю́рий Никола́евич Тыня́нов
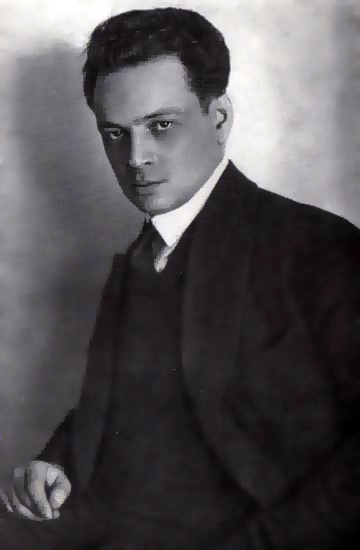
- Born: Yury Nasonovich Tynyanov; October 18, 1894; Rezhitsa, Russian Empire
- Died: December 20, 1943 (aged 49); Moscow, USSR
- Resting place: Vagankovo Cemetery, Moscow
- Education: Petrograd State University
- Occupations: Writer, screenwriter, translator, literary critic, scholar
- Spouse: Liya Abelevna Zilber (m. 1916)
- Children: 1
- Writing career
- Language: Russian
- Years active: 1921 - 1943
- Notable work: Lieutenant Kijé

Yury Nikolaevich Tynyanov (Russian: Ю́рий Никола́евич Тыня́нов, IPA: [ˈjʉrʲɪj nʲɪkɐˈlajɪvʲɪtɕ tɨˈnʲænəf]; October 18, 1894 – December 20, 1943) was a Soviet writer, literary critic, translator, scholar and screenwriter. He was an authority on Pushkin and an important member of the Russian Formalist school.

Born in a Jewish community in the Russian Empire in modern-day Latvia, he moved to Saint Petersburg where he completed his education. During the 1920s in the Soviet Union, he published numerous novels, works, and movie scripts, as well as working as a translator. However, his health declined during the 1930s and he died in 1943 from multiple sclerosis.

== Early life and education ==
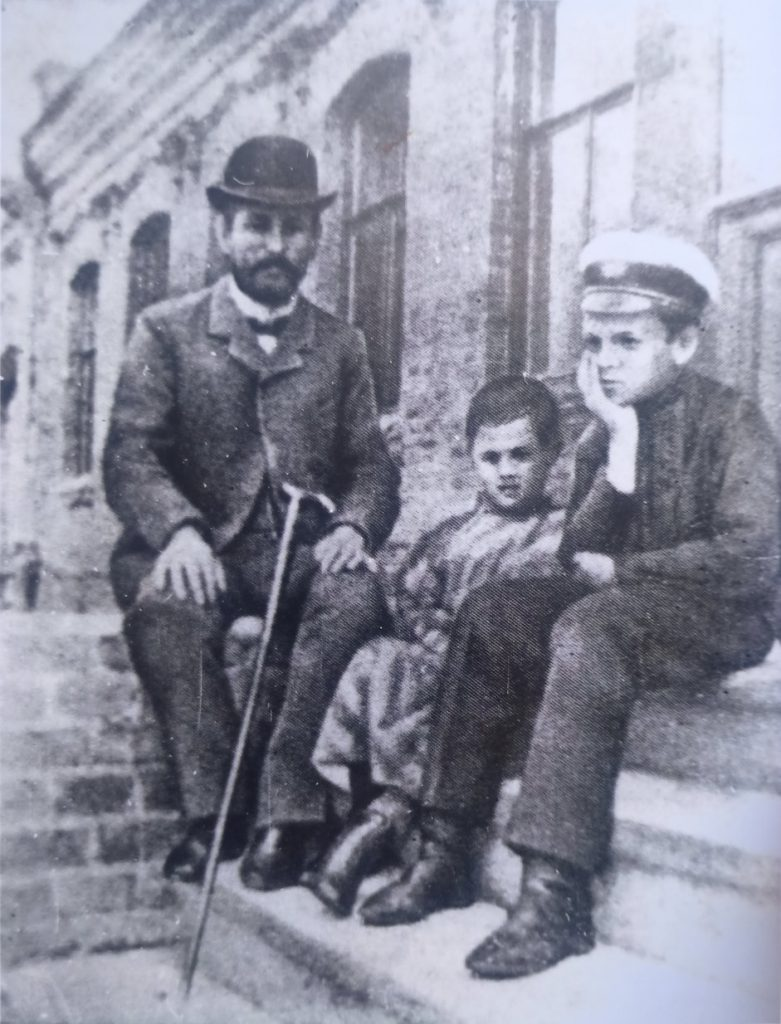
Yury Tynyanov as a child (middle) with his older brother Lev and his father

Yury Nikolaevich Tynyanov was born on 18 October 1894 in Rezhitsa, Vitebsk Governorate, Russian Empire - modern day Latvia. Tynyanov was born in a Jewish community, but would go on to have little connections with his Jewish heritage. His father, Nikolai Arkadyevich Tynyanov, was a doctor while his mother, Sofya Borisovna Tynyanova (née Epshtein), was a co-owner of a tannery.

At age nine in 1904, Tynyanov attended the Pskov Provincial Gymnasium after he passed the entrance exams. With his brother, Tynyanov lived primarily in Pskov when he was attending the school, returning to Rezhitsa during the holidays via train to see his mother and sister, Lydia. He graduated in 1912 with a silver medal. Tynyanov then entered the Faculty of History and Philology of Saint Petersburg University.

In 1916, he married Liya Abelevna Zilber, the elder sister of his friend and well-known Russian author Veniamin Kaverin. During his time in university, Tynyanov frequented the Pushkin seminar held by a venerable literary academic, Semyon Vengerov.

=== Russian Civil War ===
When the February Revolution began in 1917, Tynyanov was in Petrograd with his wife and daughter, Inna Yuryevna Tynyanov. Liya and Inna went back to Pskov, while Tynyanov remained in Petrograd to continue his studies. In summer 1918, he went to Yaroslavl to visit his parents who been living in the city since 1915. The Yaroslavl Uprising and subsequent bombing by the Bolsheviks, destroyed parts of Yaroslavl, including Tynayanov's library where he collected books since his time in Pskov and his diploma work on Küchelbecker. To see his wife and daughter, he crossed into lands occupied by Germans.

During the Civil War, he worked in several jobs. Along with his university studies, he began teaching literature at a school. He also lectured at the House of Arts and the House of Writers. He also served as a French translator and head of the Information Department of the Petrograd Bureau of the Commintern. In 1919, he graduated from university and found employment at the Department of Russian Literature.

== Career ==
In 1921, Tynyanov became a professor at the Petrograd Institute of Art History at the age of 27. During this time, he also began teaching 18th- to 20th-century Russian poetry and was a member of the Society for the Study of Poetic Language. In 1921, he published his first book titled Dostoevsky and Gogol, where he compared the works of Dostoevsky and Gogol. In 1925, Tynyanov released his first novel called Kukhlya. In 1927, he published another piece of historical fiction titled The Death of Vazir-Mukhtar. Archaists and Innovators was released in 1929.

Aside from writing novels, Tynyanov wrote the scripts for the movies The Overcoat (1926), Asya (1928) and The Club of the Big Deed (1927) in collaboration with Y.G. Oksman. As a translator, he translated the poems of Heinrich Heine from German to Russian.

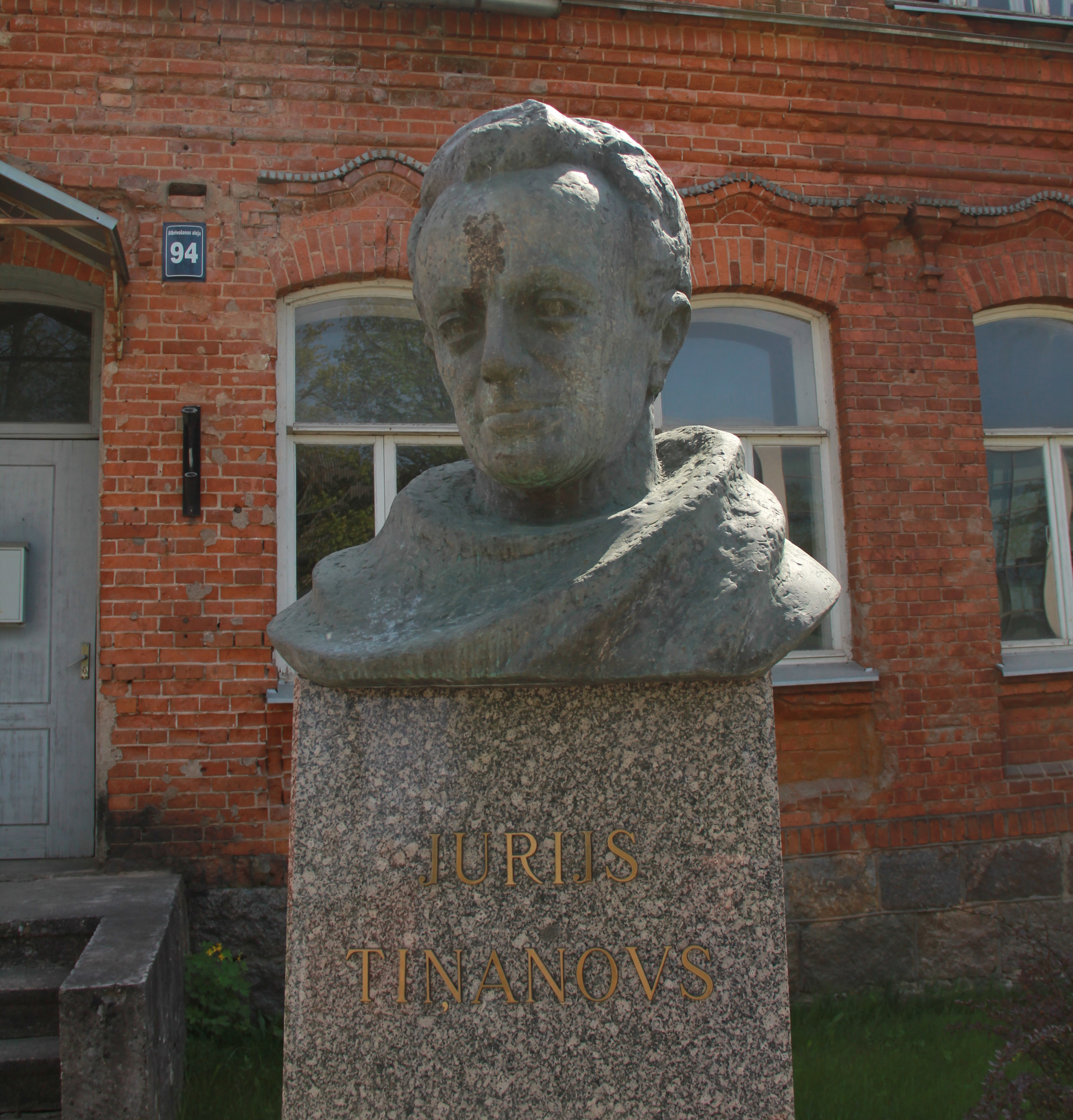
Bust of Tynyanov near his childhood home in Rēzekne, Latvia, 2016

=== Later life and death ===
During the 1930s, Tynyanov slowly developed symptoms of multiple sclerosis. In 1932, he began to write his monograph Pushkin. However, multiple sclerosis began to take its toll. He then required a cane to walk. By 1940, Tynyanov had lost his ability to walk. Nevertheless, he continued writing on Pushkin and finished the work's third part in 1943. Tynyanov died on 20 December 1943 in Moscow, aged 49.

== Legacy ==
On 28 May 1981, a museum dedicated to Tynyanov opened in his hometown in Rezekne Secondary School No.6. The museum was supported by Tynyanov's friend Veniamin Aleksandrovich Kaverin, his sister Lydia and his daughter Inna. The museum continues to operate in Latvia.

== Major works ==
In 1928, together with Roman Jakobson, Tynyanov wrote a famous manifesto titled Problems in the Study of Language and Literature. It was published in the same year in the journal Novyji LEF, which was associated with the Russian Futurists, a movement closely tied to Russian Formalism. The short article could be summarised in the following manner:

1. Literary and linguistic science has to have a precise theoretical basis and accurate terminology. Jakobson and Tynyanov criticize their contemporary scholars for haphazardly combining new methodologies with outdated ones, especially the application of psychological literary analysis. However, analysis should not be neglected in favor of narrow formalistic approaches purely relying on classification and nomenclature.
2. The history of literature involves a complex of specific structural laws that need to be elucidated to enable comparison between literary history and other historical "series."
3. The evolution of literature must be studied systematically and intrinsically. Extraliterary sources may only be used when considered functionally.
4. Saussure's distinction between synchrony and diachrony made synchronic analysis a useful tool for linguistics and literary history prior to the publication of the manifesto, as it showed the systemicity of language and literature at each individual moment of their existence. However, Jakobson and Tynyanov argue that recent developments have made pure synchronism impossible. The past and future aspects of any system are inseparable structural elements of itself. Evolution is thus systemic.
5. Examining a synchronic literary system does not merely entail amassing disconnected bits of information about chronologically co-existing phenomena. Instead, phenomena within a given epoch have to be hierarchically related to each other.
6. Saussure's distinction between langue and parole, as well as the analysis of their mutual relationship, should be extended from linguistics to literary studies.
7. Analyzing the structural laws of literature and language, including their evolution, yields a limited typology of structural types.
8. Although intrinsic analysis should be the focus, the immanent laws of literary and linguistic evolution can only be fully illuminated by correlating literary/linguistic history to other historical series. This "system of systems," i.e., the correlation of several historical processes of change taken as a whole, has its own structural laws that remain to be investigated.

Tynyanov also wrote historical novels in which he applied his theories. His other notable works included popular biographies of Alexander Pushkin and Wilhelm Küchelbecker as well as translations of Heinrich Heine and other authors.

== Selected bibliography ==
=== In English ===
Works by Yury Tynyanov

- Formalist theory, translated by L.M. O'Toole and Ann Shukman (1977)
- Death of the Vazir-Mukhtar, translated by Susan Causey (edited by Vera Tsareva-Brauner), Look Multimedia (2018)
- The Death of Vazir-Mukhtar, translated by Anna Kurkina Rush and Christopher Rush, Columbia University Press, 2021 (The Russian Library)
- Lieutenant Kijé / Young Vitushishnikov: Two Novellas (Eridanos Library, No. 20), translated by Mirra Ginsburg (1990)
- Lieutenant Kizhe, translated by Nicolas Pasternak Slater, Look Multimedia (2021)
- "Permanent Evolution: Selected Essays on Literature, Theory and Film" translated and edited by Ainsley Morse & Philip Redko (2019, Academic Studies Press)

Works edited by Yury Tynyanov

- Russian Prose, edited by Boris Mikhailovich Eikhenbaum and Yury Tynyanov, translated by Ray Parrot (1985)

=== In Russian ===
Novels:

- Кюхля, 1925
- Смерть Вазир-Мухтара, 1928
- Пушкин, 1936

Novellas and stories:

- Подпоручик Киже, 1927
- Восковая персона, 1930
- Малолетный Витушишников, 1933
- Гражданин Очер

On Pushkin and his era:

- Архаисты и Пушкин, 1926
- Пушкин, 1929
- Пушкин и Тютчев, 1926
- О "Путешествии в Арзрум", 1936
- Безыменная любовь, 1939
- Пушкин и Кюхельбекер, 1934
- Французские отношения Кюхельбекера, 1939

1. Путешествие Кюхельбекера по Западной Европе в 1820 – 1821 гг.
2. Декабрист и Бальзак.

- Сюжет "Горя от ума", 1943
