= Moscow City Duma District 12 =

Moscow City Duma electoral constituency

- Moscow City Duma constituency
- Deputy: Aleksey Lisovenko; United Russia
- Administrative Okrug: North-Eastern
- Districts: Babushkinsky, Losinoostrovsky, Yaroslavsky
- Voters: 166,689 (2024)

Moscow City Duma District 12 is one of 45 constituencies in Moscow City Duma. Currently the district covers parts of North-Eastern Moscow.

The district has been represented since 2024 by United Russia deputy Aleksey Lisovenko, a former State Duma member, who succeeded retiring one-term United Russia incumbent and park director Igor Buskin, redistricted there from District 13.

== Boundaries ==
District boundaries from 2014 to 2024

1993–1997: Bogorodskoye, Metrogorodok, Preobrazhenskoye, Sokolniki
The district covered parts of Eastern Moscow.

1997–2001: Bogorodskoye, Metrogorodok, Preobrazhenskoye, Sokolniki, TEOS Sokolniki Park
The district was unchanged with Sokolniki Park being elevated to a separate administrative division status.

2001–2005: Bogorodskoye, Metrogorodok, Preobrazhenskoye, Sokolniki, part of Sokolinaya Gora, TEOS Sokolniki Park (Note: merged with Sokolniki District in 2002)
The district continued to cover parts of Eastern Moscow and gained part of Sokolinaya Gora from District 14.

2005–2009: Akademichesky, Cheryomushki, Konkovo, Tyoply Stan, Yasenevo, Zyuzino
The district was completely reconfigured as it was placed into South-Western Moscow, overlapping the then-eliminated State Duma Cheryomushki constituency.

2009–2014: Biryuleyovo Zapadnoye, Chertanovo Tsentralnoye, Chertanovo Yuzhnoye, Severnoye Butovo, Yuzhnoye Butovo
The district was rearranged prior to the 2009 election, after the number of constituencies was increased from 15 to 17. The district was based in South-Western and Southern Moscow, which were previously a part of District 11.

2014–2024: Severnoye Medvedkovo, Sviblovo, Yuzhnoye Medvedkovo
The district was completely rearranged in the 2014 redistricting as it was moved to cover outer parts of North-Eastern Moscow.

2024–present: Babushkinsky, Losinoostrovsky, Yaroslavsky
During the 2023–24 Moscow redistricting the former district was renumbered District 11. In its new configuration the district took the entirety of former District 13.

== Members elected ==
Election	Member	Party
1993	Valentina Prisyazhnyuk	Independent
1997	Valentina Prisyazhnyuk	Independent
2001	Valentina Prisyazhnyuk	Yabloko
2005	Aleksandr Semennikov	United Russia
2009	Oleg Bocharov (Note: appointed Director of Moscow Department of Science, Industrial Policy, and Entrepreneurship in September 2014)	United Russia
2014	Aleksey Shaposhnikov	United Russia
2019	Aleksey Shaposhnikov	Independent
2024	Aleksey Lisovenko	United Russia

== Election results ==
=== 2001 ===
Summary of the 16 December 2001 Moscow City Duma election in District 12
Candidate	Party	Votes	%
Valentina Prisyazhnyuk (incumbent)	Yabloko	31,512	54.96%
Andrey Kassirov	Communist Party	10,703	18.67%
Tatyana Aristova	Independent	7,145	12.46%
against all		6,435	11.22%
Total		57,902	100%

=== 2005 ===
Summary of the 4 December 2005 Moscow City Duma election in District 12
Candidate	Party	Votes	%
Aleksandr Semennikov (incumbent) (Note: redistricted from District 27)	United Russia	61,014	37.88%
Mikhail Gromov	Independent	27,269	16.93%
Igor Nikulin	Rodina	25,397	15.77%
Dmitry Katayev (incumbent) (Note: redistricted from District 25)	Yabloko-United Democrats	22,602	14.03%
Tatyana Voyevodina	Independent	10,459	6.49%
Sergey Gulyaykin	Liberal Democratic Party	5,816	3.61%
Total		161,088	100%

=== 2009 ===
Summary of the 11 October 2009 Moscow City Duma election in District 12
Candidate	Party	Votes	%
Oleg Bocharov (incumbent) (Note: redistricted from District 11)	United Russia	92,226	71.28%
Nikolay Taranyov	Communist Party	15,577	12.04%
Vladimir Zhirnov	A Just Russia	10,649	8.23%
Ravil Ishmuratov	Liberal Democratic Party	6,474	5.00%
Total		129,394	100%

=== 2014 ===
Summary of the 14 September 2014 Moscow City Duma election in District 12
Candidate	Party	Votes	%
Aleksey Shaposhnikov	United Russia	16,801	52.13%
Yevgeny Marchenko	Communist Party	5,590	17.35%
Vladimir Khodakov	Yabloko	3,286	10.20%
Aleksandr Sapronov	Liberal Democratic Party	2,010	6.24%
Tatyana Fokina	A Just Russia	1,875	5.82%
Lidia Tafintseva	Independent	1,607	4.99%
Total		32,227	100%

=== 2019 ===
Summary of the 8 September 2019 Moscow City Duma election in District 12
Candidate	Party	Votes	%
Aleksey Shaposhnikov (incumbent)	Independent	14,227	40.83%
Aleksandr Yefimov	Communist Party	13,087	37.56%
Maksim Yefimov	Liberal Democratic Party	2,613	7.50%
Nikita Yankovoy	A Just Russia	2,358	6.77%
Pavel Trofimov	Communists of Russia	1,463	4.20%
Total		34,842	100%

=== 2024 ===
Summary of the 6–8 September 2024 Moscow City Duma election in District 12
Candidate	Party	Votes	%
Aleksey Lisovenko	United Russia	29,644	43.27%
Anton Korytov	Communist Party	10,114	14.76%
Daniil Ponizov	New People	7,191	10.50%
Yevgeny Rybin	Liberal Democratic Party	6,505	9.49%
Aleksandr Polyakov	Independent	5,378	7.85%
Denis Romashkin	Independent	4,338	6.33%
Leonid Zavaritsky	Communists of Russia	4,293	6.27%
Maksim Fitkhulin	Independent	1,020	1.49%
Total		68,514	100%
