= Moscow City Duma District 22 =

Moscow City Duma electoral constituency

- Moscow City Duma constituency
- Deputy: Maksim Rudnev; United Russia
- Administrative Okrug: South-Eastern
- Districts: Kuzminki, part of Lyublino
- Voters: 159,531 (2024)

Moscow City Duma District 22 is one of 45 constituencies in Moscow City Duma. Currently the district covers parts of South-Eastern Moscow.

The district has been represented since 2024 by United Russia deputy Maksim Rudnev, a party official, who succeeded retiring one-term incumbent and My Moscow faction leader Yelena Nikolayeva after Nikolayeva was redistricted from District 23.

== Boundaries ==
District boundaries from 2014 to 2024

1993–2001: Brateyevo, Orekhovo-Borisovo Yuzhnoye, Zyablikovo
The district covered outer parts of Southern Moscow.

2001–2005: part of Brateyevo, Orekhovo-Borisovo Yuzhnoye, Zyablikovo
The district continued to cover outer parts of Southern Moscow but cede part of Brateyevo to District 21.

2005–2014: constituency abolished
Prior to the 2005 election the number of constituencies was reduced to 15, so the district was eliminated.

2014–2024: Kapotnya, part of Lyublino, part of Maryino
The district was created prior to the 2014 election, after Moscow City Duma had been expanded from 35 to 45 seats. It covers parts of South-Eastern Moscow.

2024–present: Kuzminki, part of Lyublino
During the 2023–24 Moscow redistricting most of the former district was put into District 20 (Kapotnya, part of Lyublino, small part of Maryino), while most of Maryino was put into District 21. In its new configuration the district retained only part of Maryino and took most of former District 23 (western Maryino and Kuzminki).

== Members elected ==
Election	Member	Party
1993	Yevgeny Balashov	Moscow Civic Union
1997	Yevgeny Balashov	Independent
2001	Yevgeny Balashov	Independent
2005	Constituency eliminated	
2009	Constituency eliminated	
2014	Inna Svyatenko	United Russia
2019	Inna Svyatenko	Independent
2024	Maksim Rudnev	United Russia

== Election results ==
=== 2001 ===
Summary of the 16 December 2001 Moscow City Duma election in District 22
Candidate	Party	Votes	%
Yevgeny Balashov (incumbent)	Independent	37,877	58.94%
Vladimir Gavrilov	Communist Party	12,296	19.13%
against all		10,687	16.63%
Total		65,396	100%

=== 2014 ===
Summary of the 14 September 2014 Moscow City Duma election in District 22
Candidate	Party	Votes	%
Inna Svyatenko	United Russia	18,158	55.67%
Vladimir Volkov	Communist Party	5,828	17.87%
Marina Karavayeva	Yabloko	3,203	9.82%
Aleksandr Vlasov	Liberal Democratic Party	3,045	9.34%
Valery Solyanin	A Just Russia	1,335	4.09%
Total		32,617	100%

=== 2019 ===
Summary of the 8 September 2019 Moscow City Duma election in District 22
Candidate	Party	Votes	%
Inna Svyatenko (incumbent)	Independent	15,190	44.93%
Dmitry Sarayev	Communist Party	11,018	32.59%
Anton Yegorov	Liberal Democratic Party	2,475	7.32%
Dmitry Monastyrev	A Just Russia	1,849	5.47%
Vladimir Badmayev	Communists of Russia	1,809	5.35%
Total		33,809	100%

=== 2024 ===
Summary of the 6–8 September 2024 Moscow City Duma election in District 22
Candidate	Party	Votes	%
Maksim Rudnev	United Russia	32,155	49.48%
Yelena Gulicheva	Communist Party	9,024	13.89%
Vladimir Obozny	A Just Russia – For Truth	7,231	11.13%
Darya Averkina	New People	6,577	10.12%
Yegor Velichko	Liberal Democratic Party	5,686	8.75%
Yelena Gulina	Independent	4,289	6.60%
Total		64,984	100%
