= Moscow City Duma District 11 =

Moscow City Duma electoral constituency

- Moscow City Duma constituency
- Deputy: Aleksey Shaposhnikov; United Russia
- Administrative Okrug: North-Eastern
- Districts: Severnoye Medvedkovo, Sviblovo, Yuzhnoye Medvedkovo
- Voters: 164,413 (2024)

Moscow City Duma District 11 is one of 45 constituencies in Moscow City Duma. Currently the district covers outer parts of North-Eastern Moscow.

The district has been represented since 2024 by Moscow City Duma Chairman and United Russia deputy Aleksey Shaposhnikov, who was redistricted from District 12.

== Boundaries ==
District boundaries from 2014 to 2024

1993–2001: Butyrsky, Marfino, Otradnoye, Yuzhnoye Medvedkovo
The district covered parts of North-Eastern Moscow.

2001–2005: Butyrsky, Marfino, part of Otradnoye, Yuzhnoye Medvedkovo
The district continued to cover parts of North-Eastern Moscow but lost part of Otradnoye from District 8.

2005–2009: Biryuleyovo Zapadnoye, Chertanovo Severnoye, Chertanovo Tsentralnoye, Chertanovo Yuzhnoye, Kotlovka, Nagorny, Severnoye Butovo, Yuzhnoye Butovo
The district was completely reconfigured as it was placed into South-Western and Southern Moscow, overlapping the then-eliminated State Duma Chertanovo constituency.

2009–2014: Biryuleyovo Vostochnoye, Brateyevo, Orekhovo-Borisovo Severnoye, Orekhovo-Borisovo Yuzhnoye, Zyablikovo
The district was rearranged prior to the 2009 election, after the number of constituencies was increased from 15 to 17. The district was based in Southern Moscow, which was previously a part of District 10.

2014–2024: Altufyevsky, Marfino, Otradnoye
The district was completely rearranged in the 2014 redistricting as it was moved to cover parts of North-Eastern Moscow.

2024–present: Severnoye Medvedkovo, Sviblovo, Yuzhnoye Medvedkovo
During the 2023–24 Moscow redistricting the former district was renumbered District 10. In its new configuration the district took the entirety of former District 12.

== Members elected ==
Election	Member	Party
1993	Aleksandr Krutov	Citizens for People's Power
1997	Aleksandr Krutov	Constitutional Democratic Party
2001	Aleksandr Krutov	Independent
2005	Oleg Bocharov	United Russia
2009	Stepan Orlov	United Russia
2014	Nikolay Zubrilin	Communist Party
2019	Nikolay Zubrilin	Communist Party
2024	Aleksey Shaposhnikov	United Russia

== Election results ==
=== 2001 ===
Summary of the 16 December 2001 Moscow City Duma election in District 11
Candidate	Party	Votes	%
Aleksandr Krutov (incumbent)	Independent	21,020	37.52%
Andrey Babushkin	Yabloko	15,052	26.87%
Nikolay Zubrilin	Independent	9,451	16.87%
against all		8,472	15.12%
Total		56,602	100%

=== 2005 ===
Summary of the 4 December 2005 Moscow City Duma election in District 11
Candidate	Party	Votes	%
Oleg Bocharov (incumbent) (Note: redistricted from District 24)	United Russia	106,108	61.65%
Yevgeny Volkov	Communist Party	28,439	16.52%
Sergey Kuranov	Independent	14,444	8.39%
Anzhelika Goryunova	Liberal Democratic Party	12,888	7.49%
Total		172,107	100%

=== 2009 ===
Summary of the 11 October 2009 Moscow City Duma election in District 11
Candidate	Party	Votes	%
Stepan Orlov (incumbent) (Note: redistricted from District 10)	United Russia	129,559	74.46%
Sergey Timokhov	Communist Party	16,152	9.28%
Larisa Gorchakova	A Just Russia	11,455	6.58%
Maksim Pershin	Liberal Democratic Party	6,816	3.92%
Yevgeny Ageyev	Independent	5,283	3.04%
Total		173,987	100%

=== 2014 ===
Summary of the 14 September 2014 Moscow City Duma election in District 11
Candidate	Party	Votes	%
Nikolay Zubrilin	Communist Party	10,466	32.41%
Andrey Babushkin	Yabloko	9,026	27.95%
Igor Siliverstov	A Just Russia	6,767	20.95%
Vadim Savateyev	Liberal Democratic Party	4,738	14.67%
Total		32,296	100%

=== 2019 ===
Summary of the 8 September 2019 Moscow City Duma election in District 11
Candidate	Party	Votes	%
Nikolay Zubrilin (incumbent)	Communist Party	15,775	43.12%
Yevgeny Nifantyev	Independent	12,167	33.26%
Yevgeny Rybin	Liberal Democratic Party	4,593	12.55%
Aleksandr Luchin	A Just Russia	2,715	7.42%
Total		36,585	100%

=== 2024 ===
Summary of the 6–8 September 2024 Moscow City Duma election in District 11
Candidate	Party	Votes	%
Aleksey Shaposhnikov (incumbent) (Note: redistricted from District 12)	United Russia	40,192	57.20%
Yevgeny Stepkin	Liberal Democratic Party	7,145	10.17%
Dmitry Bolotnikov	Communist Party	5,831	8.30%
Aleksandr Boldin	Communists of Russia	5,103	7.26%
Andrey Khrenov	Independent	4,706	6.70%
Arseny Chzhan	New People	3,789	5.39%
Timur Galeyev	A Just Russia – For Truth	3,457	4.92%
Total		70,260	100%
