= Moscow City Duma District 21 =

Moscow City Duma electoral constituency

- Moscow City Duma constituency
- Deputy: Inna Svyatenko; United Russia
- Administrative Okrug: South-Eastern
- Districts: part of Maryino
- Voters: 156,832 (2024)

Moscow City Duma District 21 is one of 45 constituencies in Moscow City Duma. Currently, the district covers most of Maryino in South-Eastern Moscow.

The district has been represented since 2024 by Senator Inna Svyatenko, a United Russia six-term member, who was redistricted from District 22.

== Boundaries ==
District boundaries from 2014 to 2024

1993–1997: Moskvorechye-Saburovo, Nagatino-Sadovniki, Nagorny, Tsaritsyno
The district covered parts of Southern Moscow.

1997–2001: Chertanovo Yuzhnoye, Moskvorechye-Saburovo, Tsaritsyno
The district continued to cover parts of Southern Moscow, however, it was moved southwards, ceding Nagorny and Nagatino-Sadovniki to District 20 and Nagorny District to District 24, while gaining Chertanovo Yuzhnoye from District 24.

2001–2005: part of Brateyevo, Chertanovo Yuzhnoye, Moskvorechye-Saburovo, Tsaritsyno
The district continued to cover parts of Southern Moscow and gained part of Brateyevo from District 22.

2005–2014: constituency abolished
Prior to the 2005 election the number of constituencies was reduced to 15, so the district was eliminated.

2014–2024: part of Ryazansky, part of Vykhino-Zhulebino
The district was created prior to the 2014 election, after Moscow City Duma had been expanded from 35 to 45 seats. It covers parts of South-Eastern Moscow.

2024–present: part of Maryino
During the 2023–24 Moscow redistricting the district was eliminated and split between districts 20 (Vykhino-Zhulebino) and 23 (Ryazansky District). In its new configuration the district is confined to Maryino, covering most of the raion, which was previously divided between district 22 and 25. It is the only Moscow City Duma district, covering only one raion.

== Members elected ==
Election	Member	Party
1993	Svetlana Zhuravleva	Independent
1997	Stepan Orlov	Independent
2001	Stepan Orlov	Independent
2005	Constituency eliminated	
2009	Constituency eliminated	
2014	Andrey Klychkov (Note: appointed acting Governor of Oryol Oblast in October 2017)	Communist Party
2019	Leonid Zyuganov	Communist Party
2024	Inna Svyatenko	United Russia

== Election results ==
=== 2001 ===
Summary of the 16 December 2001 Moscow City Duma election in District 21
Candidate	Party	Votes	%
Stepan Orlov (incumbent)	Independent	40,527	53.14%
Mikhail Virin	Independent	8,006	10.50%
Vladimir Yemelyanov	Independent	6,189	8.12%
Svetlana Nosova	Independent	6,162	8.08%
Vladimir Mashkin	Independent	3,537	4.64%
Konstantin Morozov	Independent	1,530	2.01%
against all		8,827	11.57%
Total		77,246	100%

=== 2014 ===
Summary of the 14 September 2014 Moscow City Duma election in District 21
Candidate	Party	Votes	%
Andrey Klychkov	Communist Party	13,968	37.32%
Vladimir Zotov	United Russia	12,037	32.16%
Valery Katkov	A Just Russia	5,051	13.50%
Svetlana Rodionova	Yabloko	3,035	8.11%
Aleksey Balabutkin	Independent	1,462	3.91%
Artyom Lipagin	Liberal Democratic Party	858	2.29%
Total		37,427	100%

=== 2019 ===
Summary of the 8 September 2019 Moscow City Duma election in District 21
Candidate	Party	Votes	%
Leonid Zyuganov	Communist Party	17,233	57.40%
Vera Shevchenko	Independent	5,362	17.86%
Yekaterina Borodina	A Just Russia	3,173	10.57%
Andrey Shakh	Liberal Democratic Party	2,767	9.22%
Total		30,021	100%

=== 2024 ===
Summary of the 6–8 September 2024 Moscow City Duma election in District 21
Candidate	Party	Votes	%
Inna Svyatenko (incumbent) (Note: redistricted from District 22)	United Russia	40,036	59.15%
Dmitry Bondar	New People	10,436	15.42%
Aleksandr Pankov	Liberal Democratic Party	8,336	12.32%
Yury Nabiyev	A Just Russia – For Truth	6,800	10.05%
Giorgi Margaryan	Independent	2,070	3.06%
Total		67,685	100%
