= Moscow City Duma District 1 =

Moscow City Duma electoral constituency

- Moscow City Duma constituency
- District boundaries since 2014
- Deputy: Andrey Titov; United Russia
- Administrative Okrug: Zelenograd
- Districts: Kryukovo, Matushkino, Savyolki, Silino, Staroye Kryukovo
- Voters: 186,703 (2024)

Moscow City Duma District 1 is one of 45 constituencies in Moscow City Duma. Currently the constituency covers all of Zelenograd.

The district has been represented since 2019 by United Russia member Andrey Titov, a businessman, who succeeded retiring five-term United Russia incumbent and Federation Council member Zinaida Dragunkina.

== Boundaries ==
1993–1997: Meshchansky, Presnensky, Tverskoy
The district covered northern parts of Central Moscow.

1997–2005: Arbat, Khamovniki, Presnensky, Yakimanka
The district was reconfigured to cover western parts of Central Moscow, losing Meshchansky and Tverskoy district to District 2 and gaining Arbat, Khamovniki and Yakimanka from District 3.

2005–2014: Arbat, Basmanny, Khamovniki, Krasnoselsky, Meshchansky, Presnensky, Tagansky, Tverskoy, Yakimanka, Zamoskvorechye
The district was reconfigured as it was expanded to cover the entirety of Central Moscow, overlapping the then-eliminated State Duma Central constituency.

2014–present: Kryukovo, Matushkino, Savyolki, Silino, Staroye Kryukovo
The district was completely rearranged in the 2014 redistricting as it was moved to the entirety of Zelenograd.

== Members elected ==
Election	Member	Party
1993	Mikhail Moskvin-Tarkhanov	Choice of Russia
1997	Sergey Goncharov	Independent
2001	Sergey Goncharov	Independent
2005	Inna Svyatenko	United Russia
2009	Inna Svyatenko	United Russia
2014	Zinaida Dragunkina	United Russia
2019	Andrey Titov	Independent
2024	Andrey Titov	United Russia

== Election results ==
=== 2001 ===
Summary of the 16 December 2001 Moscow City Duma election in District 1
Candidate	Party	Votes	%
Sergey Goncharov (incumbent)	Independent	24,849	48.63%
Natalia Borodina	Yabloko	11,550	22.61%
Sergey Bocharov	Independent	6,527	12.77%
Pavel Tertsiyev	Liberal Democratic Party	809	1.58%
against all		5,960	11.66%
Total		51,554	100%

=== 2005 ===
Summary of the 4 December 2005 Moscow City Duma election in District 1
Candidate	Party	Votes	%
Inna Svyatenko (incumbent) (Note: redistricted from District 3)	United Russia	68,657	41.68%
Yelena Lukyanova	Communist Party	42,660	25.90%
Yury Novikov	Independent	30,016	18.22%
Aleksandr Russky	Independent	7,836	4.76%
Aleksey Folvarkov	Liberal Democratic Party	5,651	3.43%
Total		164,737	100%

=== 2009 ===
Summary of the 11 October 2009 Moscow City Duma election in District 1
Candidate	Party	Votes	%
Inna Svyatenko (incumbent)	United Russia	112,578	66.33%
Aleksandr Pavlov	Communist Party	26,647	15.70%
Natalia Borodina	A Just Russia	13,255	7.81%
Sergey Basalay	Liberal Democratic Party	7,552	4.45%
Nikolay Seleznev	Independent	4,925	2.90%
Total		169,717	100%

=== 2014 ===
Summary of the 14 September 2014 Moscow City Duma election in District 1
Candidate	Party	Votes	%
Zinaida Dragunkina	United Russia	19,050	44.15%
Grigory Goncharuk	Communist Party	6,404	14.84%
Artur Aleksanyan	Civic Platform	5,775	13.38%
Aleksandr Venediktov	A Just Russia	5,107	11.84%
Aleksandr Butuzov	Liberal Democratic Party	3,340	7.74%
Maksim Bolotin	Yabloko	1,995	4.62%
Total		43,149	100%

=== 2019 ===
Summary of the 8 September 2019 Moscow City Duma election in District 1
Candidate	Party	Votes	%
Andrey Titov	Independent	16,136	38.76%
Ivan Ulyanchenko	Communist Party	14,165	34.03%
Svetlana Nikitushkina	A Just Russia	3,403	8.17%
Olga Zhagina	Communists of Russia	3,332	8.00%
Vyacheslav Milovanov	Liberal Democratic Party	3,156	7.58%
Total		41,631	100%

=== 2024 ===
Summary of the 6–8 September 2024 Moscow City Duma election in District 1
Candidate	Party	Votes	%
Andrey Titov (incumbent)	United Russia	39,271	49.96%
Olga Sorokina	New People	12,389	15.76%
Ivan Ulyanchenko	Communist Party	8,613	10.96%
Olga Vasilyeva	A Just Russia – For Truth	7,223	9.19%
Dmitry Baranov	Liberal Democratic Party	6,896	8.77%
Sergey Ulyanov	Communists of Russia	4,192	5.33%
Total		78,606	100%
