= Moscow City Duma District 3 =

Moscow City Duma electoral constituency

- Moscow City Duma constituency
- Deputy: Anton Shkaplerov; United Russia
- Administrative Okrug: North-Western
- Districts: part of Mitino, part of Pokrovskoye-Streshnevo, part of Severnoye Tushino, Yuzhnoye Tushino
- Voters: 171,876 (2024)

Moscow City Duma District 3 is one of 45 constituencies in Moscow City Duma. Currently the district covers parts of North-Western Moscow.

The district has been represented since 2024 by United Russia deputy Anton Shkaplerov, an active cosmonaut, who succeeded retiring one-term A Just Russia – For Truth incumbent Aleksandr Solovyov.

== Boundaries ==
District boundaries from 2014 to 2024

1993–1997: Arbat, Khamovniki, Yakimanka, Zamoskvorechye
The district covered southern parts of Central Moscow.

1997–2005: Pechatniki, Tagansky, Yuzhnoportovy, Zamoskvorechye
The district retained only Zamoskvorechye, losing the rest of its territory to District 1, as the district was moved eastwards to grab Taganski District (District 2), Yuzhnoportovy District (District 17) and Pechatniki (District 19).

2005–2009: Beskudnikovsky, Dmitrovsky, Khovrino, Levoberezhny, Molzhaninovsky, Vostochnoye Degunino, Zapadnoye Degunino, Zelenograd
The district was completely reconfigured as it was placed into Northern Moscow and Zelenograd, overlapping the then-eliminated State Duma Sheremetyevo constituency.

2009–2014: Beskudnikovsky, Dmitrovsky, Khovrino, Vostochnoye Degunino, Zapadnoye Degunino, Zelenograd
The district was slightly reconfigured as Levoberezhny was redistricted to District 2 and Molzhaninovsky – to District 17.

2014–2024: Mitino, Pokrovskoye-Streshnevo, part of Shchukino
The district was completely rearranged in the 2014 redistricting as it was moved to cover parts of North-Western Moscow.

2024–present: part of Mitino, part of Pokrovskoye-Streshnevo, part of Severnoye Tushino, Yuzhnoye Tushino
During the 2023–24 Moscow redistricting the district retained just parts of Mitino, Pokrovskoye-Streshnevo, losing western and northern Mitino to District 2, most of Pokrovskoye-Streshnevo and Shchukino – to District 4. In exchange, the district gained Yuzhnoye Tushino and southern half of Severnoye Tushino from District 2.

== Members elected ==
| Election | Member | Party |
|---|---|---|
| 1993 | Sergey Goncharov | Independent |
| 1997 | Nikolay Moskovchenko | Independent |
| 2001 | Inna Svyatenko | Independent |
| 2005 | Viktor Ivanov | United Russia |
| 2009 | Viktor Ivanov | United Russia |
| 2014 | Valery Skobinov | United Russia |
| 2019 | Aleksandr Solovyov | A Just Russia |
| 2024 | Anton Shkaplerov | United Russia |

== Election results ==
=== 2001 ===
Summary of the 16 December 2001 Moscow City Duma election in District 3
| Candidate | Party | Votes | % |
|---|---|---|---|
| Inna Svyatenko | Independent | 18,262 | 30.13% |
| Aleksandr Shabalov | Independent | 15,016 | 24.77% |
| Igor Shapovalov | Independent | 7,208 | 11.89% |
| Vladimir Rodionov | Independent | 5,225 | 8.62% |
| Maksim Tretyukhin | Anarchists | 1,888 | 3.11% |
| Oleg Chirkov | Independent | 1,766 | 2.91% |
| against all | | 8,735 | 14.41% |
| Total | | 61,194 | 100% |

=== 2005 ===
Summary of the 4 December 2005 Moscow City Duma election in District 3
| Candidate | Party | Votes | % |
|---|---|---|---|
| Viktor Ivanov (incumbent) (Note: redistricted from District 5) | United Russia | 53,630 | 37.50% |
| Pyotr Miloserdov | Communist Party | 25,918 | 18.12% |
| Zhanna Nemtsova | Independent | 13,140 | 9.19% |
| Lyudmila Lipina | Liberal Democratic Party | 12,044 | 8.42% |
| Andrey Morozov | Russian Party of Life | 11,997 | 8.39% |
| Boris Berdnik | Agrarian Party | 11,431 | 7.99% |
| Vladimir Morozov | Independent | 4,755 | 3.32% |
| Total | | 143,022 | 100% |

=== 2009 ===
Summary of the 11 October 2009 Moscow City Duma election in District 3
| Candidate | Party | Votes | % |
|---|---|---|---|
| Viktor Ivanov (incumbent) | United Russia | 66,626 | 54.18% |
| Sergey Nikitin | Communist Party | 19,212 | 15.62% |
| Viktor Fedoruk | A Just Russia | 12,313 | 10.01% |
| Andrey Vlasov | Liberal Democratic Party | 10,838 | 8.81% |
| Vladimir Morozov | Independent | 7,870 | 6.40% |
| Total | | 122,980 | 100% |

=== 2014 ===
Summary of the 14 September 2014 Moscow City Duma election in District 3
| Candidate | Party | Votes | % |
|---|---|---|---|
| Valery Skobinov (incumbent) (Note: redistricted from District 17) | United Russia | 17,729 | 51.07% |
| Yury Anashkin | Independent | 5,490 | 15.81% |
| Dmitry Sarayev | Communist Party | 4,861 | 14.00% |
| Albert Arzumanyan | Yabloko | 2,149 | 6.19% |
| Vladimir Demidko | A Just Russia | 1,925 | 5.54% |
| Daniil Belov | Liberal Democratic Party | 1,519 | 4.38% |
| Total | | 34,718 | 100% |

=== 2019 ===
Summary of the 8 September 2019 Moscow City Duma election in District 3
| Candidate | Party | Votes | % |
|---|---|---|---|
| Aleksandr Solovyov | A Just Russia | 13,578 | 34.95% |
| Sabina Tsvetkova | Independent | 12,795 | 32.94% |
| Leonid Voskresensky | Communists of Russia | 8,010 | 20.62% |
| Yury Shevchenko | Liberal Democratic Party | 2,792 | 7.19% |
| Total | | 38,846 | 100% |

=== 2024 ===
Summary of the 6–8 September 2024 Moscow City Duma election in District 3
| Candidate | Party | Votes | % |
|---|---|---|---|
| Anton Shkaplerov | United Russia | 35,632 | 51.95% |
| Gennady Goncharov | Independent | 8,502 | 12.40% |
| Dmitry Lesnyak | Liberal Democratic Party | 6,360 | 9.27% |
| Vladislav Sultanov | New People | 4,898 | 7.14% |
| Andrey Gulko | A Just Russia – For Truth | 4,139 | 6.03% |
| Roman Ustyuzhanin | Communist Party | 4,113 | 6.00% |
| Dmitry Frolov | Communists of Russia | 3,353 | 4.89% |
| Anatoly Udaltsov | Independent | 1,557 | 2.27% |
| Total | | 68,586 | 100% |
