= Moscow City Duma District 7 =

Moscow City Duma electoral constituency

- Moscow City Duma constituency
- Deputy: Darya Borisova; United Russia
- Administrative Okrug: Northern
- Districts: Aeroport, part of Khoroshyovsky, Koptevo, Sokol, Voykovsky
- Voters: 186,903 (2024)

Moscow City Duma District 7 is one of 45 constituencies in Moscow City Duma. Currently the district covers inner parts of Northern Moscow.

The district has been represented since 2024 by United Russia deputy Darya Borisova, a patriotic education centre director, who succeeded retiring one-term Yabloko incumbent and foreign agent Darya Besedina, redistricted there from District 8.

== Boundaries ==
District boundaries from 2014 to 2024

1993–1997: Aeroport, Khoroshyovsky, Sokol, Voykovsky
The district covered inner parts of Northern Moscow.

1997–2001: Aeroport, Khoroshyovsky, Shchukino, Sokol
The district lost Voykovsky District to District 4 and gained Shchukino in North-Western Moscow from District 33.

2001–2005: Aeroport, Khoroshyovsky, Shchukino, Sokol, part of Pokrovskoye-Streshnevo
The district continued to cover outer parts of Northern and North-Western Moscow and gained part of Pokrovskoye-Strehnevo from District 34.

2005–2014: Ivanovskoye, Kosino-Ukhtomsky, Novogireyevo, Novokosino, Perovo, Sokolinaya Gora, Veshnyaki
The district was completely reconfigured as it was placed into Eastern Moscow, overlapping the then-eliminated State Duma Perovo constituency.

2014–2024: part of Beskudnikovsky, Dmitrovsky, Vostochnoye Degunino, part of Zapadnoye Degunino
The district was completely rearranged in the 2014 redistricting as it was moved to cover outer parts of Northern Moscow.

2024–present: Aeroport, part of Khoroshyovsky, Koptevo, Sokol, Voykovsky
During the 2023–24 Moscow redistricting all of the former district was renumbered District 6. In its new configuration the district took all of former District 8 as well as a small part of Khoroshyovsky District from District 9.

== Members elected ==
Election	Member	Party
1993	Galina Khovanskaya (Note: elected to State Duma in December 2003)	Choice of Russia
1997	Galina Khovanskaya	Yabloko
2001	Galina Khovanskaya	Yabloko
2005	Vera Stepanenko	United Russia
2009	Vera Stepanenko	United Russia
2014	Nadezhda Perfilova	Independent
2019	Nadezhda Perfilova	Independent
2024	Darya Borisova	United Russia

== Election results ==
=== 2001 ===
Summary of the 16 December 2001 Moscow City Duma election in District 7
Candidate	Party	Votes	%
Galina Khovanskaya (incumbent)	Yabloko	30,608	49.10%
Sergey Nikitin	Communist Party	15,708	25.20%
Andrey Kuznetsov	Independent	7,014	11.25%
against all		7,278	11.67%
Total		62,987	100%

=== 2004 ===
The results of the by-election were invalidated due to against all line receiving most votes, another by-election was not scheduled as 2005 election was due to be held in less than a year.

Summary of the 14 March 2004 Moscow City Duma by-election in District 7
Candidate	Party	Votes	%
Aleksandr Kidyayev	United Russia	21,651	19.97%
Vladimir Ulas	Communist Party	19,820	18.28%
Yury Zhukov	Independent	17,064	15.74%
Aleksey Orlov	Independent	15,301	14.11%
Andrey Svintsov	Liberal Democratic Party	2,384	2.20%
against all		27,740	25.58%
Total		108,423	100%

=== 2005 ===
Summary of the 4 December 2005 Moscow City Duma election in District 7
Candidate	Party	Votes	%
Vera Stepanenko (incumbent) (Note: redistricted from District 15)	United Russia	43,839	30.32%
Sergey Loktionov (incumbent) (Note: redistricted from District 16)	Independent	41,990	29.05%
Andrey Kochanov	Communist Party	18,753	12.97%
Yelena Bogoroditskaya	Independent	9,906	6.85%
Leonid Kolosov	Independent	8,116	5.61%
Maksim Sadkovsky	Liberal Democratic Party	6,522	4.51%
Arkady Muravyev	Agrarian Party	5,896	4.08%
Total		144,565	100%

=== 2009 ===
Summary of the 11 October 2009 Moscow City Duma election in District 7
Candidate	Party	Votes	%
Vera Stepanenko (incumbent)	United Russia	67,156	54.04%
Aleksandr Potapov	Communist Party	21,784	17.53%
Yevgeny Subbotin	A Just Russia	14,413	11.60%
Viktor Podobedov	Liberal Democratic Party	9,476	7.63%
Aleksey Abramov	Independent	5,810	4.68%
Total		124,273	100%

=== 2014 ===
Summary of the 14 September 2014 Moscow City Duma election in District 7
Candidate	Party	Votes	%
Nadezhda Perfilova	Independent	16,257	45.85%
Pyotr Zvyagintsev	Communist Party	7,481	21.10%
Aleksandr Dunyashev	Independent	2,613	7.37%
Svetlana Potapova	Civilian Power	2,321	6.55%
Vladimir Samoshin	Yabloko	2,282	6.44%
Aleksandr Molochko	Liberal Democratic Party	1,578	4.45%
Vladimir Khomyakov	A Just Russia	1,557	4.39%
Total		35,456	100%

=== 2019 ===
Summary of the 8 September 2019 Moscow City Duma election in District 7
Candidate	Party	Votes	%
Nadezhda Perfilova (incumbent)	Independent	12,909	35.75%
Pyotr Zvyagintsev	Communist Party	12,772	35.37%
Anton Verbenkin	Liberal Democratic Party	3,371	9.34%
Pavel Kushakov	A Just Russia	3,132	8.67%
Yelena Lugovskaya	Communists of Russia	2,686	7.44%
Total		36,106	100%

=== 2024 ===
Summary of the 6–8 September 2024 Moscow City Duma election in District 7
Candidate	Party	Votes	%
Darya Borisova	United Russia	30,378	46.67%
Anastasia Rotkova	Communist Party	8,441	12.97%
Andrey Pangayev	The Greens	7,272	11.17%
Anatoly Farafonov	New People	6,259	9.62%
Dmitry Matyushenkov	Liberal Democratic Party	5,214	8.01%
Mikhail Timkov	A Just Russia – For Truth	4,051	6.22%
Igor Stepanov	Independent	3,448	5.30%
Total		65,095	100%
