= Moscow City Duma District 32 =

Moscow City Duma electoral constituency

- Moscow City Duma constituency
- Deputy: Aleksandr Semennikov; United Russia
- Administrative Okrug: South-Western
- Districts: Severnoye Butovo, Yasenevo
- Voters: 171,905 (2024)

Moscow City Duma District 32 is one of 45 constituencies in Moscow City Duma. Currently the constituency covers outer parts of South-Western Moscow.

The district has been represented since 2024 by United Russia faction leader Aleksandr Semennikov, a six-term member, who was redistricted from District 34.

== Boundaries ==
District boundaries from 2014 to 2024

1993–2005: Filyovsky Park, Krylatskoye, Kuntsevo
The district covered northern parts of Western Moscow.

2005–2014: constituency abolished
Prior to the 2005 election the number of constituencies was reduced to 15, so the district was eliminated.

2014–2024: Danilovsky, Donskoy, Nagatino-Sadovniki, parts of Nagatinsky Zaton
The district was created prior to the 2014 election, after Moscow City Duma had been expanded from 35 to 45 seats. It covered inner central parts of Southern Moscow.

2024–present: Severnoye Butovo, Yasenevo
During the 2023–24 Moscow redistricting most of the territory of the old district became District 30, except for part of Nagatinsky Zaton which was united with the rest of the raion in District 27. In its new configuration the district was created from most of District 34 (Yasenevo and Severnoye Butovo), as well as gaining the rest of Severnoye Butovo from former District 33.

== Members elected ==
Election	Member	Party
1993	Yury Yemelyanov	Moscow Civic Union
1997	Yevgeny Bunimovich	Yabloko
2001	Yevgeny Bunimovich	Yabloko
2005	Constituency eliminated	
2009	Constituency eliminated	
2014	Tatyana Lomakina	United Russia
2019	Olga Melnikova	Independent
2024	Aleksandr Semennikov	United Russia

== Election results ==
=== 2001 ===
Summary of the 16 December 2001 Moscow City Duma election in District 32
Candidate	Party	Votes	%
Yevgeny Bunimovich (incumbent)	Yabloko	18,905	33.47%
Aleksandr Muzyka	Independent	10,848	19.21%
Dmitry Prokhorov	Workers Party	8,720	15.44%
Gleb Smyslov	Independent	4,612	8.17%
Aleksandr Romanovich	Million Friends	3,184	5.64%
against all		8,561	15.16%
Total		56,930	100%

=== 2014 ===
Summary of the 14 September 2014 Moscow City Duma election in District 32
Candidate	Party	Votes	%
Tatyana Lomakina	United Russia	12,036	35.98%
Kirill Goncharov	Yabloko	7,944	23.75%
Roman Dyachkov	Communist Party	4,326	12.93%
Anatoly Pochukayev	Rodina	2,927	8.75%
Boris Chernyshov	Liberal Democratic Party	1,828	5.47%
Sergey Zhuravsky	A Just Russia	1,807	5.40%
Tatyana Shinkarenko	Independent	1,510	4.51%
Total		33,448	100%

=== 2019 ===
Summary of the 8 September 2019 Moscow City Duma election in District 32
Candidate	Party	Votes	%
Olga Melnikova	Independent	12,119	36.48%
Klim Likhachev	Communist Party	11,679	35.16%
Vladimir Bernev	Liberal Democratic Party	2,192	6.60%
Vladimir Zalishchak	A Just Russia	2,192	6.60%
Sergey Padalka	The Greens	2,155	6.49%
Denis Kulikov	Communists of Russia	1,665	5.01%
Total		33,221	100%

=== 2024 ===
Summary of the 6–8 September 2024 Moscow City Duma election in District 32
Candidate	Party	Votes	%
Aleksandr Semennikov (incumbent) (Note: redistricted from District 34)	United Russia	35,656	49.50%
Yevgeny Kopayev	New People	10,377	14.40%
Vitaly Naumenko	Liberal Democratic Party	7,960	11.05%
Margarita Ivanova	Communist Party	6,943	9.64%
Roksana Tumanova	A Just Russia – For Truth	6,683	9.28%
Oksana Yelizarova	Communists of Russia	4,380	6.08%
Total		72,039	100%
