= Moscow City Duma District 20 =

Moscow City Duma electoral constituency

- Moscow City Duma constituency
- Deputy: Leonid Zyuganov; Communist Party
- Administrative Okrug: South-Eastern
- Districts: Kapotnya, part of Lyublino, part of Maryino, part of Vykhino-Zhulebino
- Voters: 155,226 (2024)

Moscow City Duma District 20 is one of 45 constituencies in Moscow City Duma. Currently the district covers outer parts of South-Eastern Moscow.

The district has been represented since 2024 by Communist Leonid Zyuganov, a three-term member, who was redistricted from District 21.

== Boundaries ==
District boundaries from 2014 to 2024

1993–1997: Danilovsky, Donskoy, Nagatinsky Zaton
The district covered inner parts of Southern Moscow.

1997–2005: Danilovsky, Donskoy, Nagatino-Sadovniki, Nagatinsky Zaton, TEOS ZiL (Note: merged into Danilovsky District in 2002)
The district continued to cover inner parts of Southern Moscow, gaining Nagatino-Sadovniki from District 21.

2005–2014: constituency abolished
Prior to the 2005 election the number of constituencies was reduced to 15, so the district was eliminated.

2014–2024: Kosino-Ukhtomsky, Nekrasovka, Novokosino, parts of Veshnyaki, part of Vykhino-Zhulebino
The district was created prior to the 2014 election, after Moscow City Duma had been expanded from 35 to 45 seats. It is based South-Eastern and Eastern Moscow, covering mostly raions outside the Moscow Ring Road.

2024–present: Kapotnya, part of Lyublino, part of Maryino, part of Vykhino-Zhulebino
During the 2023–24 Moscow redistricting most of the former district was put into District 19, except for Novokosino, which was redistricted into District 18. In its new configuration the district took almost all of former District 22 and part of Vykhino-Zhulebino from District 21.

== Members elected ==
Election	Member	Party
1993	Valery Sevostyanov	Choice of Russia
1997	Andrey Voykov	Independent
2001	Mikhail Antontsev	Independent
2005	Constituency eliminated	
2009	Constituency eliminated	
2014	Andrey Shibayev	Rodina
2019	Yevgeny Stupin (Note: expelled in May 2024)	Communist Party
2024	Leonid Zyuganov	Communist Party

== Election results ==
=== 2001 ===
Summary of the 16 December 2001 Moscow City Duma election in District 20
Candidate	Party	Votes	%
Mikhail Antontsev	Independent	29,899	44.74%
Mark Vasilyev	Independent	9,237	13.82%
Vladimir Rabinkov	Yabloko	7,773	11.63%
Yury Kaminsky	Independent	5,890	8.81%
against all		11,601	17.36%
Total		68,456	100%

=== 2014 ===
Summary of the 14 September 2014 Moscow City Duma election in District 20
Candidate	Party	Votes	%
Andrey Shibayev	Rodina	17,009	50.86%
Aleksandr Timchenko	Communist Party	6,379	19.08%
Yevgeny Korsakov	Liberal Democratic Party	2,679	8.01%
Aleksandr Molokhov	Yabloko	2,620	7.83%
Aleksandr Pavlenko	A Just Russia	2,356	7.05%
Vitaly Shulmin	Independent	1,201	3.59%
Total		33,440	100%

=== 2019 ===
Summary of the 8 September 2019 Moscow City Duma election in District 20
Candidate	Party	Votes	%
Yevgeny Stupin	Communist Party	17,496	45.03%
Maksim Shingarkin	Rodina	8,512	21.91%
Valery Danilovtsev	A Just Russia	4,137	10.65%
Viktor Bukreyev	Liberal Democratic Party	3,664	9.43%
Dmitry Zakharov	Communists of Russia	3,112	8.01%
Total		38,858	100%

=== 2024 ===
Summary of the 6–8 September 2024 Moscow City Duma election in District 20
Candidate	Party	Votes	%
Leonid Zyuganov (incumbent) (Note: redistricted from District 21)	Communist Party	21,353	33.07%
Aleksandr Lomachenko	United Russia	17,193	26.63%
Gennady Roshchupkin	Liberal Democratic Party	9,817	15.21%
Konstantin Mineyev	New People	9,366	14.51%
Ilia Burlyayev	A Just Russia – For Truth	6,788	10.51%
Total		64,562	100%
