= Moscow City Duma District 25 =

Moscow City Duma electoral constituency

- Moscow City Duma constituency
- Deputy: Yevgeny Selivyorstov; United Russia
- Administrative Okrug: Southern
- Districts: Brateyevo, part of Moskvorechye-Saburovo, Zyablikovo
- Voters: 156,266 (2024)

Moscow City Duma District 25 is one of 45 constituencies in Moscow City Duma. Currently the district covers outer parts of Southern Moscow.

The district has been represented since 2024 by United Russia deputy Yevgeny Selivyorstov, a former City Housing Inspection deputy head, who succeeded retiring three-term United Russia incumbent Kirill Shchitov from District 26.

== Boundaries ==
District boundaries from 2014 to 2024

1993–2001: Akademichesky, Gagarinsky, Lomonosovsky
The district covered inner parts of South-Western Moscow.

2001–2005: Akademichesky, part of Cheryomushki, Gagarinsky, Lomonosovsky
The district continued to cover inner parts of South-Western Moscow as well as gaining part of Cheryomushki from District 26.

2005–2014: constituency abolished
Prior to the 2005 election the number of constituencies was reduced to 15, so the district was eliminated.

2014–2024: part of Maryino, Pechatniki
The district was created prior to the 2014 election, after Moscow City Duma had been expanded from 35 to 45 seats. It covers parts of South-Eastern Moscow along the Moskva River.

2024–present: Brateyevo, part of Moskvorechye-Saburovo, Zyablikovo
During the 2023–24 Moscow redistricting the district was split between districts 21 (Maryino) and 24 (Pechatniki). In its new configuration the district covers the most of former District 26 (Brateyevo, Zyablikovo) and part of Moskvorechye-Saburovo from former District 28.

== Members elected ==
Election	Member	Party
1993	Dmitry Katayev	Choice of Russia
1997	Dmitry Katayev	Independent
2001	Dmitry Katayev	Union of Right Forces
2005	Constituency eliminated	
2009	Constituency eliminated	
2014	Lyudmila Stebenkova	United Russia
2019	Lyudmila Stebenkova	Independent
2024	Yevgeny Selivyorstov	United Russia

== Election results ==
=== 2001 ===
Summary of the 16 December 2001 Moscow City Duma election in District 25
Candidate	Party	Votes	%
Dmitry Katayev (incumbent)	Union of Right Forces	16,006	30.43%
Andrey Shcherbina	Independent	10,412	19.80%
Vladimir Rodin	Communist Party	10,200	19.39%
Sergey Mikhin	Independent	4,460	8.48%
Sergey Zagraevsky	Independent	1,958	3.72%
Vladimir Kishinets	Independent	1,805	3.43%
against all		6,266	11.91%
Total		52,853	100%

=== 2014 ===
Summary of the 14 September 2014 Moscow City Duma election in District 25
Candidate	Party	Votes	%
Lyudmila Stebenkova (incumbent) (Note: redistricted from District 8)	United Russia	16,701	52.93%
Yekaterina Yengalycheva	Communist Party	5,244	16.62%
Anton Antonov-Ovseyenko	Yabloko	2,358	7.47%
Oleg Ananyev	Independent	2,355	7.46%
Natalya Meshcheryakova	A Just Russia	2,303	7.30%
Sergey Kozadayev	Liberal Democratic Party	1,588	5.03%
Total		31,553	100%

=== 2019 ===
Summary of the 8 September 2019 Moscow City Duma election in District 25
Candidate	Party	Votes	%
Lyudmila Stebenkova (incumbent)	Independent	11,600	37.32%
Andrey Oryol	Communist Party	10,488	33.74%
Denis Merkulov	Liberal Democratic Party	2,967	9.55%
Sergey Smirnov	Civilian Power	1,945	6.26%
Dmitry Rakitin	Communists of Russia	1,344	4.32%
Vladislav Kotsyuba	A Just Russia	887	2.85%
Stanislav Polishchuk	Independent	642	2.07%
Total		31,083	100%

=== 2024 ===
Summary of the 6–8 September 2024 Moscow City Duma election in District 25
Candidate	Party	Votes	%
Yevgeny Selivyorstov	United Russia	35,297	51.85%
Nikolay Sergeyev	Communist Party	8,298	12.19%
Valeria Khlynova	New People	7,677	11.28%
Anastasia Afanasyeva	Communists of Russia	6,578	9.66%
Larisa Senina	Independent	5,226	7.68%
Yelena Skorokhodova	A Just Russia – For Truth	4,977	7.31%
Total		68,075	100%
