= Moscow City Duma District 34 =

Moscow City Duma electoral constituency

- Moscow City Duma constituency
- Deputy: Yekaterina Razzakova; United Russia
- Administrative Okrug: South-Western
- Districts: Cheryomushki, Obruchevsky, Zyuzino
- Voters: 182,448 (2024)

Moscow City Duma District 34 is one of 45 constituencies in Moscow City Duma. Currently the district covers parts of South-Western Moscow.

The district has been represented since 2024 by United Russia deputy Yekaterina Razzakova, a community activist and municipal deputy, who succeeded retiring two-term United Russia incumbent Olga Sharapova, (Note: member of My Moscow faction in 2014–2019) redistricted there from District 36.

== Boundaries ==
District boundaries from 2014 to 2024

1993–1997: Kurkino, Mitino, Pokrovskoye-Streshnevo, Severnoye Tushino, Yuzhnoye Tushino
The district covered most of North-Western Moscow.

1997–2001: Kurkino, Pokrovskoye-Streshnevo, Severnoye Tushino, Yuzhnoye Tushino
The district continued to cover most of North-Western Moscow but ceded Mitino to District 35.

2001–2005: Kurkino, parts of Mitino, parts of Pokrovskoye-Streshnevo, Severnoye Tushino, Yuzhnoye Tushino
The district continued to cover most of North-Western Moscow and gained parts of Mitino, previously ceded to District 35, but in exchange lost parts of Pokrovskoye-Streshnevo to District 7.

2005–2014: constituency abolished
Prior to the 2005 election the number of constituencies was reduced to 15, so the district was eliminated.

2014–2024: parts of Severnoye Butovo, Yasenevo, parts of Zyuzino
The district was created prior to the 2014 election, after Moscow City Duma had been expanded from 35 to 45 seats. It covers parts of South-Western Moscow.

2024–present: Cheryomushki, Obruchevsky, Zyuzino
During the 2023–24 Moscow redistricting most of the territory of the old district became District 32 (Yasenevo and Severnoye Butovo). In its new configuration the district retained only Zyuzino (taking the rest of the raion from District 31) and is a clear successor to former District 36.

== Members elected ==
Election	Member	Party
1993	Yevgeny Proshechkin	Choice of Russia
1997	Konstantin Solovyev	Independent
2001	Valery Skobinov	Independent
2005	Constituency eliminated	
2009	Constituency eliminated	
2014	Aleksandr Semennikov	United Russia
2019	Aleksandr Semennikov	Independent
2024	Yekaterina Razzakova	United Russia

== Election results ==
=== 2001 ===
Summary of the 16 December 2001 Moscow City Duma election in District 34
Candidate	Party	Votes	%
Valery Skobinov	Independent	20,207	32.88%
Aleksandr Volodin	Independent	8,451	13.75%
Galina Leskova	Independent	6,992	11.38%
Vladimir Pomazanov	Communist Party	6,036	9.82%
Oleg Oreshkin	Independent	5,556	9.04%
Yevgeny Proshechkin	Union of Right Forces	3,512	5.71%
Rim Shakirov	Independent	1,471	2.39%
against all		7,092	11.54%
Total		62,029	100%

=== 2014 ===
Summary of the 14 September 2014 Moscow City Duma election in District 34
Candidate	Party	Votes	%
Aleksandr Semennikov	United Russia	13,913	42.04%
Vladimir Kochetkov	A Just Russia	7,034	21.25%
Gennady Zhivotov	Communist Party	5,424	16.39%
Georgy Ogorodnikov	Yabloko	3,358	10.15%
Anton Yurikov	Liberal Democratic Party	2,209	6.67%
Total		33,094	100%

=== 2019 ===
Summary of the 8 September 2019 Moscow City Duma election in District 34
Candidate	Party	Votes	%
Aleksandr Semennikov (incumbent)	Independent	11,888	36.43%
Yulia Gladkova	Communist Party	11,314	34.67%
Maksim Chirkov	A Just Russia	4,157	12.74%
Anton Yurikov	Liberal Democratic Party	2,106	6.45%
Aleksandr Filatov	Communists of Russia	2,071	6.35%
Total		32,631	100%

=== 2024 ===
Summary of the 6–8 September 2024 Moscow City Duma election in District 34
Candidate	Party	Votes	%
Yekaterina Razzakova	United Russia	36,424	52.03%
Dmitry Shumkin	New People	9,274	13.25%
Andrey Nesterenko	Liberal Democratic Party	7,466	10.66%
Andrey Seleznyov	Communist Party	6,603	9.43%
Roman Khudyakov	A Just Russia – For Truth	5,832	8.33%
Aleksandr Baklanov	Communists of Russia	4,356	6.22%
Total		70,009	100%
