= Moscow City Duma District 23 =

Moscow City Duma electoral constituency

- Moscow City Duma constituency
- Deputy: Arkady Korolkov; United Russia
- Administrative Okrug: South-Eastern
- Districts: Lefortovo, Nizhegorodsky, Ryazansky
- Voters: 158,942 (2024)

Moscow City Duma District 23 is one of 45 constituencies in Moscow City Duma. Currently the district covers inner parts of South-Eastern Moscow.

The district has been represented since 2024 by United Russia deputy Arkady Korolkov, a retired Guards Colonel, who succeeded one-term Communist incumbent Pavel Tarasov from District 24 after Tarasov was disqualified due to his administrative conviction.

== Boundaries ==
District boundaries from 2014 to 2024

1993–1997: Biryulyovo Vostochnoye, Biryulyovo Zapadnoye, Orekhovo-Borisovo Severnoye
The district covered outer parts of Southern Moscow.

1997–2005: Biryulyovo Vostochnoye, Biryulyovo Zapadnoye, Orekhovo-Borisovo Severnoye, TEOS Tsaritsyno Park (Note: merged with Biryulyovo Vostochnoye District in 2002)
The district was unchanged with Tsaritsyno Park being elevated to a separate administrative division status.

2005–2014: constituency abolished
Prior to the 2005 election the number of constituencies was reduced to 15, so the district was eliminated.

2014–2024: Kuzminki, parts of Lyublino, parts of Ryazansky
The district was created prior to the 2014 election, after Moscow City Duma had been expanded from 35 to 45 seats. It covers parts of South-Eastern Moscow.

2024–present: Lefortovo, Nizhegorodsky, Ryazansky
During the 2023–24 Moscow redistricting the district retained only Ryazansky District, while Kuzminki and part of Lyublino became separate District 22. In its new configuration the district covers the half of former District 24 (Lefortovo and Nizhegorodsky District) as well as taking part of Ryazansky District from District 21.

== Members elected ==
| Election | Member | Party |
|---|---|---|
| 1993 | Anatoly Stankov | Independent |
| 1997 | Viktor Dvurechenskikh (Note: appointed Chairman of Accounts Chamber of Moscow in February 2000) | Independent |
| 2001 | Yury Popov | Independent |
| 2005 | Constituency eliminated | |
| 2009 | Constituency eliminated | |
| 2014 | Vladimir Platonov | United Russia |
| 2019 | Yelena Nikolayeva | Independent |
| 2024 | Arkady Korolkov | United Russia |

== Election results ==
=== 2001 ===
Summary of the 16 December 2001 Moscow City Duma election in District 23
| Candidate | Party | Votes | % |
|---|---|---|---|
| Yury Popov | Independent | 20,450 | 32.27% |
| Oleg Sotnikov | Independent | 11,093 | 17.51% |
| Vladimir Belyayev | Social Democratic Party | 6,332 | 9.99% |
| Nikolay Taranev | Independent | 6,108 | 9.64% |
| Aleksandr Kapustin | Independent | 3,341 | 5.27% |
| Natalya Obletsova | Independent | 3,176 | 5.01% |
| Sergey Novikov | Independent | 2,756 | 4.35% |
| Artur Savelov | Independent | 1,241 | 1.96% |
| against all | | 7,177 | 11.33% |
| Total | | 64,661 | 100% |

=== 2014 ===
Summary of the 14 September 2014 Moscow City Duma election in District 23
| Candidate | Party | Votes | % |
|---|---|---|---|
| Vladimir Platonov | United Russia | 14,201 | 48.62% |
| Yelena Gulicheva | Communist Party | 5,935 | 20.32% |
| Sergey Shishkin | A Just Russia | 3,659 | 12.53% |
| Yury Novikov | Liberal Democratic Party | 2,496 | 8.55% |
| Yevgeny Prochik | Yabloko | 1,832 | 6.27% |
| Total | | 29,207 | 100% |

=== 2019 ===
Summary of the 8 September 2019 Moscow City Duma election in District 23
| Candidate | Party | Votes | % |
|---|---|---|---|
| Yelena Nikolayeva | Independent | 12,119 | 40.64% |
| Yelena Gulicheva | Communist Party | 10,782 | 36.16% |
| Georgy Pomerantsev | Liberal Democratic Party | 2,694 | 9.03% |
| Anton Bulatov | Communists of Russia | 2,183 | 7.32% |
| Total | | 29,820 | 100% |

=== 2014 ===
Summary of the 6–8 September 2024 Moscow City Duma election in District 23
| Candidate | Party | Votes | % |
|---|---|---|---|
| Arkady Korolkov | United Russia | 35,567 | 55.52% |
| Aleksandra Andreyeva | Independent | 8,529 | 13.31% |
| Viktoria Skrylnikova | New People | 8,109 | 12.66% |
| Vyacheslav Dushenko | A Just Russia – For Truth | 6,662 | 10.40% |
| Samson Sholademi | Liberal Democratic Party | 5,151 | 8.04% |
| Total | | 64,056 | 100% |
