= Moscow City Duma District 35 =

Moscow City Duma electoral constituency

- Moscow City Duma constituency
- Deputy: Anatoly Petrukovich; United Russia
- Administrative Okrug: South-Western
- Districts: Akademichesky, Gagarinsky, Kotlovka, Lomonosovsky
- Voters: 187,983 (2024)

Moscow City Duma District 35 is one of 45 constituencies in Moscow City Duma. Currently the district covers inner parts of South-Western Moscow.

The district has been represented since 2024 by United Russia deputy Anatoly Petrukovich, a Russian Space Research Institute director, who flipped an open seat left by one-term Yabloko incumbent Vladimir Ryzhkov as Ryzhkov resigned in January 2024.

== Boundaries ==
District boundaries from 2014 to 2024

1993–1997: Zelenograd
The district covered the entirety of Zelenograd. With just over 132 thousand voters it was the smallest constituency in Moscow, deviating from the average district by 32.9% in population.

1997–2001: Kryukovo, Mitino, Raion 1, Raion 2, Raion 3, Raion 4, TEOS Zelenogradskaya
The district continued to cover the entirety of Zelenograd and gained Mitino from District 34.

2001–2005: Kryukovo, parts of Mitino, Raion 1, Raion 2, Raion 3, Raion 4, TEOS Zelenogradskaya (Note: eliminated in 2002)
The district continued to cover the entirety of Zelenograd but ceded eastern half of Mitino back to District 34.

2005–2014: constituency abolished
Prior to the 2005 election the number of constituencies was reduced to 15, so the district was eliminated.

2014–2024: Konkovo, Tyoply Stan
The district was created prior to the 2014 election, after Moscow City Duma had been expanded from 35 to 45 seats. It covers parts of South-Western Moscow.

2024–present: Akademichesky, Gagarinsky, Kotlovka, Lomonosovsky
During the 2023–24 Moscow redistricting the territory of the old district became District 33. In its new configuration the district is a clear successor to former District 37, also gaining Kotlovka from District 36.

== Members elected ==
Election	Member	Party
1993	Aleksandr Gromyko	Party of Russian Unity and Accord
1997	Zinaida Dragunkina (Note: appointed to the Federation Council in October 2005)	Independent
2001	Zinaida Dragunkina	Independent
2005	Constituency eliminated	
2009	Constituency eliminated	
2014	Renat Layshev	Independent
2019	Natalia Metlina	Independent
2024	Anatoly Petrukovich	United Russia

== Election results ==
=== 2001 ===
Summary of the 16 December 2001 Moscow City Duma election in District 35
Candidate	Party	Votes	%
Zinaida Dragunkina (incumbent)	Independent	24,152	37.63%
Fyodor Zheleznov	Independent	17,293	26.94%
Aleksey Nemeryuk	Independent	9,550	14.88%
against all		11,063	17.24%
Total		64,594	100%

=== 2014 ===
Summary of the 14 September 2014 Moscow City Duma election in District 35
Candidate	Party	Votes	%
Renat Layshev	Independent	13,771	36.89%
Sergey Vasilyev	A Just Russia	8,579	22.98%
Olga Anokhina	Communist Party	6,393	17.93%
Valery Borshchyov	Yabloko	5,420	14.52%
Arseny Ustinov	Independent	1,126	3.02%
Sergey Parashchenko	Liberal Democratic Party	869	2.33%
Total		37,326	100%

=== 2019 ===
Summary of the 8 September 2019 Moscow City Duma election in District 35
Candidate	Party	Votes	%
Natalia Metlina	Independent	13,285	35.03%
Sergey Vasilyev	A Just Russia	10,754	28.36%
Dmitry Agranovsky	Communist Party	4,485	11.83%
Vladimir Ryazanov	Communists of Russia	3,021	7.97%
Sergey Malakhov	Independent	2,866	7.56%
Mikhail Monakhov	Liberal Democratic Party	2,204	5.81%
Total		37,922	100%

=== 2024 ===
Summary of the 6–8 September 2024 Moscow City Duma election in District 35
Candidate	Party	Votes	%
Anatoly Petrukovich	United Russia	30,650	44.97%
Aleksandr Kondratenko	Communist Party	10,586	15.53%
Olga Sabirova	New People	10,063	14.77%
Maksim Chirkov	A Just Russia – For Truth	8,017	11.76%
Gleb Trubin	Liberal Democratic Party	5,299	7.78%
Sergey Antonov	Communists of Russia	3,468	5.09%
Total		68,151	100%
