= Moscow City Duma =

Regional parliament of Moscow, Russia

Coordinates: 55.764503°N 37.61722°E

Moscow City Duma Московская городская дума
- 8th legislature
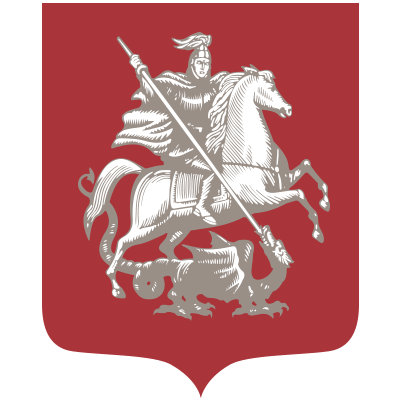

Type
- Type: Unicameral

History
- Founded: 1993
- Preceded by: Moscow City Council

Leadership
- Chairman: Aleksei Shaposhnikov, United Russia since 24 September 2014
- Vice chairmen: Lyudmila Guseva, United Russia; Stepan Orlov, United Russia since 18 September 2024

Structure
- Seats: 45
- Political groups: Government (38); United Russia (38); Support (7); CPRF (3); SR (1); New People (1); Independent (2)
- Length of term: 5 years

Elections
- Voting system: Plurality voting
- Last election: 6–8 September 2024
- Next election: 2029

Meeting place
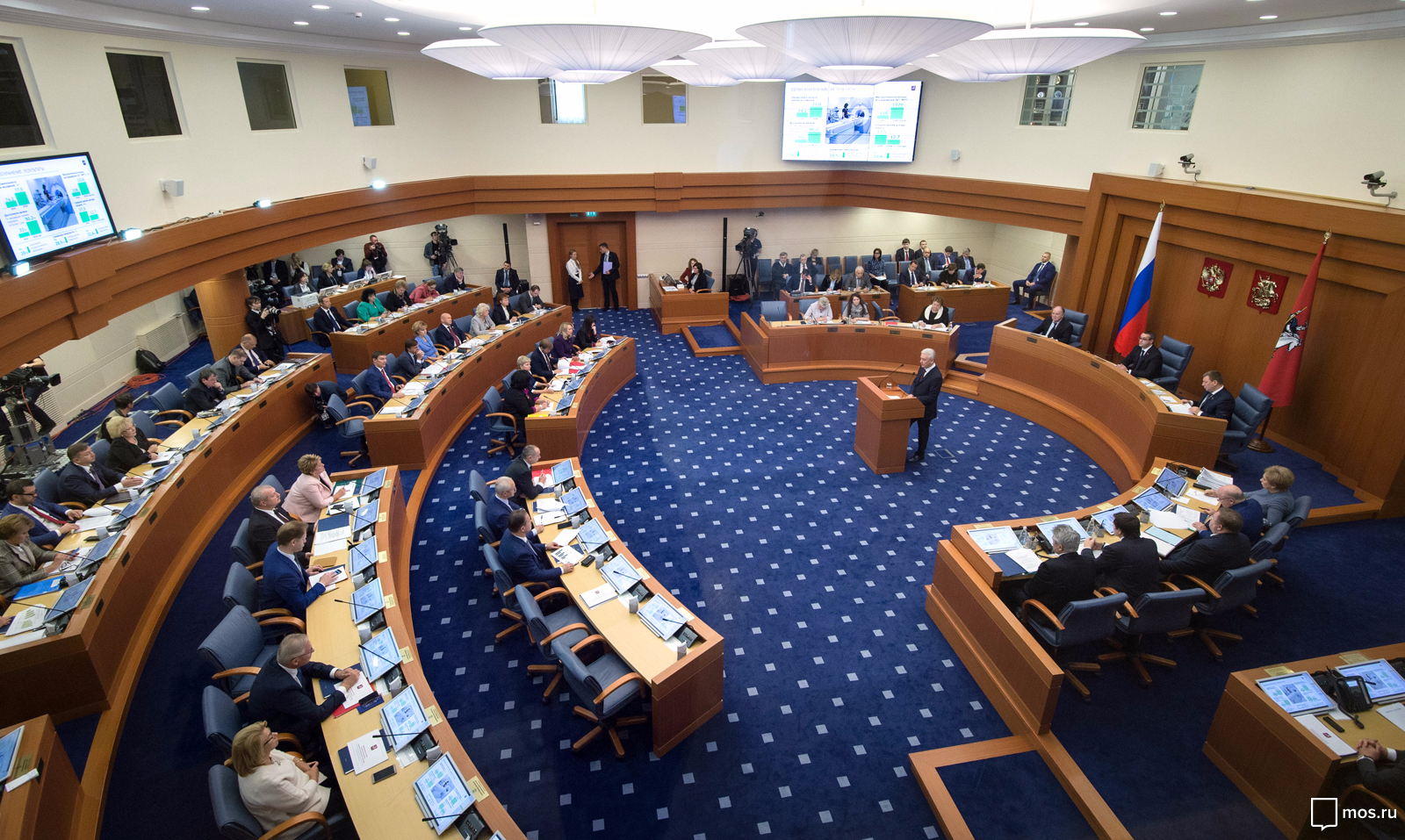
- 15/29 Strastnoy Boulevard, Moscow

Website
- duma.mos.ru/en/

The Moscow City Duma (Russian: Московская городская дума, romanized: Moskovskaya gorodskaya duma, commonly abbreviated to Мосгордума, Mosgorduma) is the regional parliament (city duma) of Moscow, a federal subject and the capital city of Russia. As Moscow is one of three federal cities, (Note: Including Sevastopol which is internationally recognized as part of Ukraine.) the city duma's legislation can only be overridden by the mayor and the federal government.

== History ==
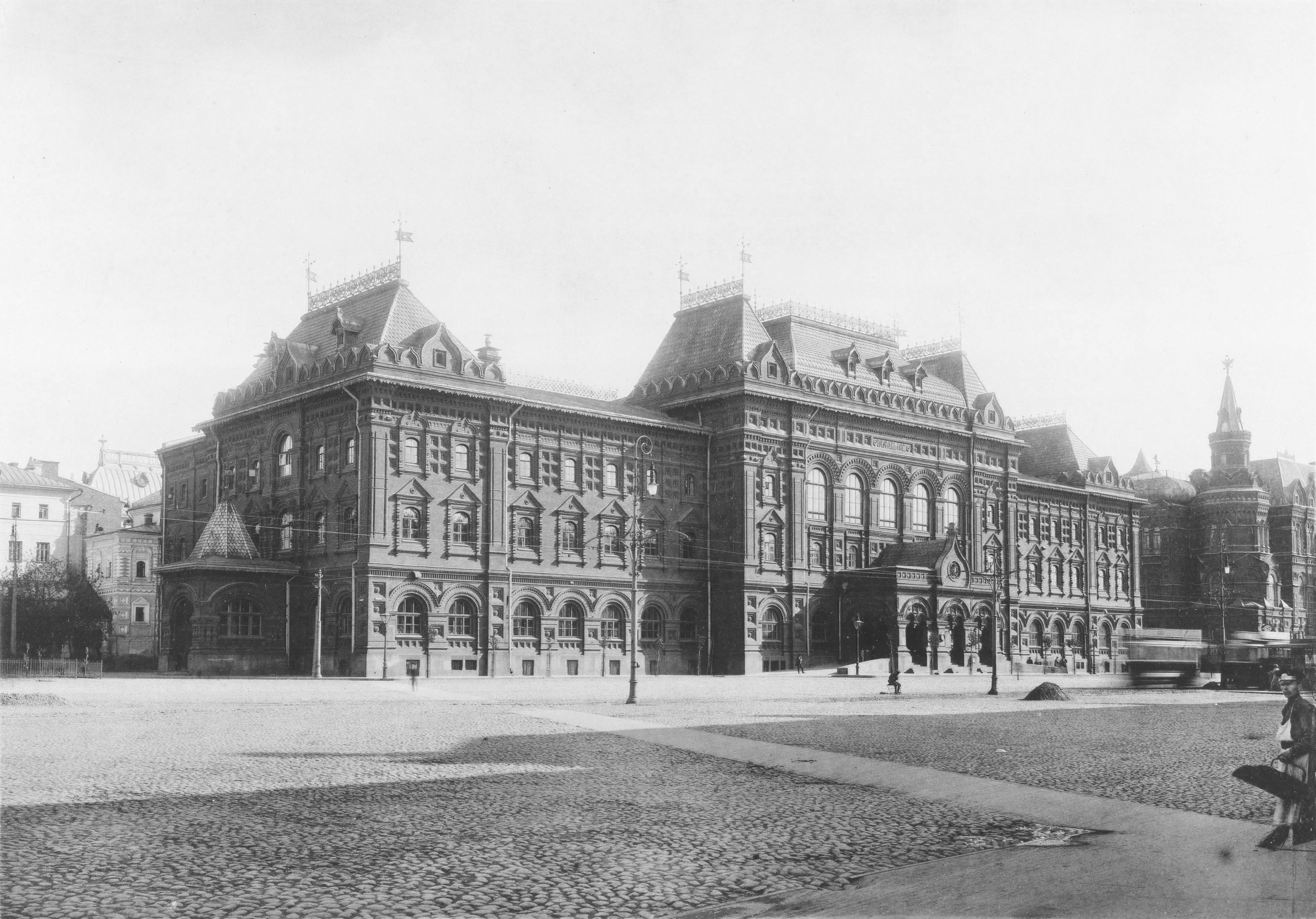
Old building of the Moscow City Duma

The original municipal legislature was established in 1785.

In 1917, the Mossoviet was established as a parallel administration in the city following the February Revolution. After the October Revolution where the Bolsheviks seized power, it was established as the city administration and replaced the Moscow City Duma.

On November 5, 1991, the Moscow City Council (Mossovet) adopted a resolution "On the Formation of the Moscow City Duma (Small Council)," to which a significant portion of the Moscow City Council’s powers was delegated. This decision served as a step toward establishing a system of professional parliamentary activity in Moscow..

The modern era of the Moscow City Duma began with decree of the President of Russia No. 1738, dated October 24, 1993, "On Supporting Measures Taken by the Government of Moscow and the Moscow Regional Council of People's Deputies to Reform State Power and Local Self-Government Bodies in the City of Moscow and the Moscow Oblast". This decree introduced a "Provisional Regulation on the System of State Power Bodies in Moscow", which defined the Duma’s operational procedures. Subsequently, an order by the Mayor of Moscow (No. 710-RM, dated December 8, 1993, "On Ensuring the Activities of the Moscow City Duma in Accordance with the Legislation of the Russian Federation") recommended a set of interim rules of procedure for the Duma. In January 1994, the Moscow City Duma adopted permanent rules of procedure governing its operations. In June 1995, the Duma adopted the Charter of the city of Moscow, which established that the source of power lies with the city's residents—those possessing the right to vote—who exercise this power either directly or through Moscow's state power and local self-government bodies. The Charter enshrined the principles for organizing local self-government, delineated the respective powers and responsibilities of the representative and executive branches, and defined the principles of Moscow’s territorial organization.

On July 13, 2001, the Moscow City Duma approved a new version of the Charter, necessitated by the enactment of Federal Law No. 184-FZ (dated October 6, 1999)—"On General Principles for the Organization of Legislative (Representative) and Executive State Power Bodies of the Subjects of the Russian Federation" as well as other federal laws regulating the organization and activities of authorities within the constituent entities of the Russian Federation. New versions of the Regulations were adopted on February 11, 1998, June 19, 2002, and November 16, 2005.

== Composition ==
The Moscow City Duma consists of 45 deputies who are elected for five-year terms from single-member districts.

From 1993 to 2001, the deputies were elected by single-member districts. From 2005 to 2009, 20 deputies were elected on party lists, and 15 from single-seat districts. From 2009 to 2014, 18 deputies were elected on party lists, and 17 from single-member districts. Since 2014, all 45 deputies are elected from single-member districts.

The last election was held in 2024.

== Electoral districts ==
Electoral districts for the 2014 and 2019 elections

== Latest election ==
Party	%	Seats	+/-
United Russia		38	New
Communist Party of the Russian Federation		3	▼10
A Just Russia – For Truth		1	▼2
New People		1	New
Liberal Democratic Party of Russia		0	Steady
Communists of Russia		0	Steady
The Greens		0	Steady
Independents		2	▼24
Registered voters/turnout	40.32		

== List of elections ==
- 12 December 1993
- 14 December 1997
- 16 December 2001
- 4 December 2005
- 11 October 2009
- 14 September 2014
- 8 September 2019
  - By-elections in 2021-2023
- 6–8 September 2024

== List of chairmen ==
No.	Portrait	Name	Term start	Term end	Convocation	Political party
1		Vladimir Platonov (born 1954)	11 July 1994	24 September 2014	I	Choice of Russia
1		Vladimir Platonov (born 1954)	11 July 1994	24 September 2014	II	Choice of Russia
1		Vladimir Platonov (born 1954)	11 July 1994	24 September 2014	III	Union of Right Forces
1		Vladimir Platonov (born 1954)	11 July 1994	24 September 2014	IV	United Russia
1		Vladimir Platonov (born 1954)	11 July 1994	24 September 2014	V	United Russia
2		Aleksei Shaposhnikov (born 1973)	24 September 2014	Incumbent	VI	United Russia
2		Aleksei Shaposhnikov (born 1973)	24 September 2014	Incumbent	VII	United Russia
2		Aleksei Shaposhnikov (born 1973)	24 September 2014	Incumbent	VIII	United Russia

== List of deputies ==
4th convocation (2005–2009)

District	Member	Party
1	Inna Svyatenko	United Russia
2	Igor Antonov	United Russia
3	Viktor Ivanov	United Russia
4	Valery Shaposhnikov	United Russia
5	Tatyana Portnova	United Russia
6	Andrey Metelsky	United Russia
7	Vera Stepanenko	United Russia
8	Mikhail Antontsev	United Russia
9	Sergey Turta	United Russia
10	Stepan Orlov	United Russia
11	Oleg Bocharov	United Russia
12	Aleksandr Semennikov	United Russia
13	Vladimir Platonov	United Russia
14	Yevgeny Gerasimov	United Russia
15	Valery Skobinov	United Russia
party list	Mikhail Moskvin-Tarkhanov	United Russia
party list	Igor Protopopov	United Russia
party list	Aleksandr Krutov	United Russia
party list	Tatyana Potyayeva	United Russia
party list	Igor Yeleferenko	United Russia
party list	Mikhail Buyanov	United Russia
party list	Lyudmila Stebenkova	United Russia
party list	Andrey Kovalyov	United Russia
party list	Irina Velikanova	United Russia
party list	Sergey Goncharov	United Russia
party list	Anton Paleyev	United Russia
party list	Aleksandr Milyavsky	United Russia
party list	Aleksandr Kovalev	United Russia
party list	Nikolay Gubenko	Communist Party
party list	Vladimir Ulas (Note: resigned in December 2007 after being elected to the State Duma)	Communist Party
party list	Sergey Nikitin	Communist Party
party list	Vladimir Lakeev	Communist Party
party list	Viktor Trifonov (Note: replaced Vladimir Ulas in January 2008)	Communist Party
party list	Ivan Novitsky	Yabloko-United Democrats
party list	Ivan Novitsky	United Russia (Note: since September 2007)
party list	Yevgeny Bunimovich	Yabloko-United Democrats
party list	Sergey Mitrokhin	Yabloko-United Democrats

5th convocation (2009–2014)

District	Member	Party
1	Inna Svyatenko	United Russia
2	Igor Antonov	United Russia
3	Viktor Ivanov	United Russia
4	Valery Shaposhnikov	United Russia
5	Tatyana Portnova	United Russia
6	Andrey Metelsky	United Russia
7	Vera Stepanenko	United Russia
8	Lyudmila Stebenkova	United Russia
9	Sergey Turta	United Russia
10	Mikhail Antontsev	United Russia
11	Stepan Orlov	United Russia
12	Oleg Bocharov (Note: resigned in September 2014 after being appointed as Director of Moscow Department of Science, Industrial Policy, and Entrepreneurship)	United Russia
13	Anton Paleyev	United Russia
14	Vladimir Platonov	United Russia
15	Aleksandr Milyavsky	United Russia
16	Yevgeny Gerasimov	United Russia
17	Valery Skobinov	United Russia
party list	Kirill Shchitov	United Russia
party list	Ivan Novitsky	United Russia
party list	Igor Protopopov	United Russia
party list	Aleksandr Krutov	United Russia
party list	Viktor Kruglyakov	United Russia
party list	Pyotr Ivanovsky	United Russia
party list	Mikhail Tishin	United Russia
party list	Anatoly Petrov	United Russia
party list	Sergey Zverev	United Russia
party list	Irina Velikanova	United Russia
party list	Mikhail Moskvin-Tarkhanov	United Russia
party list	Aleksandr Semennikov	United Russia
party list	Aleksey Ryabinin (Note: resigned in September 2014)	United Russia
party list	Sergey Goncharov	United Russia
party list	Viktor Seliverstov (Note: resigned in March 2012 after being appointed to the Presidential Administration of Russia)	United Russia
party list	Vyacheslav Sivko (Note: replaced Viktor Seliverstov in March 2012)	United Russia
party list	Nikolay Gubenko	Communist Party
party list	Vadim Kumin (Note: resigned in December 2011 after being elected to the State Duma)	Communist Party
party list	Andrey Klychkov	Communist Party
party list	Vladimir Svyatoshenko (Note: replaced Vadim Kumin in December 2011)	Communist Party

6th convocation (2014–2019)

District	Member	Party	Faction
1	Zinaida Dragunkina	United Russia	United Russia
2	Olga Yaroslavskaya	Independent	My Moscow
3	Valery Skobinov	United Russia	United Russia
4	Yevgeny Gerasimov	United Russia	United Russia
5	Oleg Soroka	United Russia	United Russia
6	Nadezhda Babkina	United Russia	United Russia
7	Nadezhda Perfilova	Independent	My Moscow
8	Leonid Zyuganov	Communist Party	Communist Party
9	Irina Ilyicheva	United Russia	United Russia
10	Larisa Kartavtseva	Independent	My Moscow
11	Nikolay Zubrilin	Communist Party	Communist Party
12	Aleksey Shaposhnikov	United Russia	United Russia
13	Tatyana Portnova	United Russia	United Russia
14	Valery Telichenko	United Russia	United Russia
15	Andrey Metelsky	United Russia	United Russia
16	Anton Molev	Independent	My Moscow
17	Aleksandr Smetanov	United Russia	United Russia
18	Irina Nazarova	Independent	My Moscow
19	Viktor Kruglyakov	United Russia	United Russia
20	Andrey Shibayev	Rodina	Rodina
21	Andrey Klychkov (Note: resigned in October 2017 after being appointed as acting Governor of Oryol Oblast)	Communist Party	Communist Party
21	vacant (since October 5, 2017)		
22	Inna Svyatenko	United Russia	United Russia
23	Vladimir Platonov	United Russia	United Russia
24	Zoya Zotova	United Russia	United Russia
25	Lyudmila Stebenkova	United Russia	United Russia
26	Kirill Shchitov	United Russia	United Russia
27	Stepan Orlov	United Russia	United Russia
28	Mikhail Antontsev	United Russia	United Russia
29	Nina Minko	Independent	My Moscow
30	Aleksey Mishin	Independent	My Moscow
31	Sergey Zverev	United Russia	United Russia
32	Tatyana Lomakina	United Russia	United Russia
33	Lyudmila Guseva	United Russia	United Russia
34	Aleksandr Semennikov	United Russia	United Russia
35	Renat Layshev	Independent	My Moscow
36	Olga Sharapova	Independent	My Moscow
37	Nikolay Gubenko	Communist Party	Communist Party
38	Mikhail Balakin	Liberal Democratic Party	Independent
39	Anton Paleyev	United Russia	United Russia
40	Aleksandr Milyavsky	United Russia	United Russia
41	Pavel Poselyonov	United Russia	United Russia
42	Tatyana Batysheva	United Russia	United Russia
43	Vera Shastina	United Russia	United Russia
44	Yelena Shuvalova	Communist Party	Communist Party
45	Yaroslav Kuzminov	Independent	My Moscow

7th convocation (2019–2024)

District	Member	Party	Faction
1	Andrey Titov	Independent	United Russia
2	Dmitry Loktev	Communist Party	Independent
3	Aleksandr Solovyov	A Just Russia	A Just Russia
4	Mariya Kiselyova	Independent	My Moscow
5	Roman Babayan	Independent	My Moscow
6	Yevgeny Bunimovich	Yabloko	Yabloko
7	Nadezhda Perfilova	Independent	United Russia
8	Darya Besedina	Independent	Yabloko
9	Andrey Medvedev	Independent	Independent
10	Larisa Kartavtseva	Independent	United Russia
11	Nikolay Zubrilin	Communist Party	Communist Party
12	Aleksey Shaposhnikov	Independent	United Russia
13	Igor Buskin	Independent	United Russia
14	Maksim Kruglov	Yabloko	Yabloko
15	Sergey Savostyanov	Communist Party	Communist Party
16	Mikhail Timonov	A Just Russia	A Just Russia
17	Viktor Maksimov	Communist Party	Communist Party
18	Yelena Yanchuk	Communist Party	Communist Party
19	Yelena Kats (Note: elected in 2021)	United Russia	United Russia
20	Yevgeny Stupin	Communist Party	Independent
21	Leonid Zyuganov	Communist Party	Communist Party
22	Inna Svyatenko	Independent	United Russia
23	Yelena Nikolayeva	Independent	My Moscow
24	Pavel Tarasov	Communist Party	Communist Party
25	Lyudmila Stebenkova	Independent	United Russia
26	Kirill Shchitov	Independent	United Russia
27	Stepan Orlov	Independent	United Russia
28	Yelena Samyshina	Independent	United Russia
29	Oleg Artemyev	Independent	United Russia
30	Margarita Rusetskaya	Independent	United Russia
31	Lyubov Nikitina	Communist Party	Communist Party
32	Olga Melnikova	Independent	United Russia
33	Lyudmila Guseva	Independent	United Russia
34	Aleksandr Semennikov	Independent	United Russia
35	Natalia Metlina	Independent	My Moscow
36	Olga Sharapova	Independent	United Russia
37	Vladimir Ryzhkov (Note: elected in 2021)	Yabloko	Yabloko
38	Aleksandr Kozlov	Independent	United Russia
39	Valery Golovchenko	Independent	My Moscow
40	Tatyana Batysheva	Independent	United Russia
41	Yevgeny Gerasimov	Independent	United Russia
42	Yekaterina Yengalycheva	Communist Party	Communist Party
43	Sergey Mitrokhin	Yabloko	Yabloko
44	Yelena Shuvalova	Communist Party	Independent
45	Magomet Yandiev	A Just Russia	A Just Russia

8th convocation (2024–2029)

District	Member	Party	Faction
1	Andrey Titov	United Russia	United Russia
2	Olga Zaitseva	United Russia	United Russia
3	Anton Shkaplerov	United Russia	United Russia
4	Mariya Kiselyova	United Russia	United Russia
5	Milena Avimskaya	United Russia	United Russia
6	Nadezhda Perfilova	United Russia	United Russia
7	Darya Borisova	United Russia	United Russia
8	Andrey Medvedev	United Russia	United Russia
9	Larisa Kartavtseva	United Russia	United Russia
10	Nikolay Zubrilin	Communist Party	Communist Party
11	Aleksey Shaposhnikov	United Russia	United Russia
12	Aleksey Lisovenko	United Russia	United Russia
13	Aleksandr Sapronov	United Russia	United Russia
14	Sabina Tsvetkova	United Russia	United Russia
15	Pyotr Potapov	Independent	Liberal Democratic Party
16	Yelena Yamshchikova	A Just Russia	A Just Russia
17	Vyacheslav Arbuzov	Communist Party	Communist Party
18	Lyudmila Mitryuk	United Russia	United Russia
19	Maya Bulayeva	United Russia	United Russia
20	Leonid Zyuganov	Communist Party	Communist Party
21	Inna Svyatenko	United Russia	United Russia
22	Maksim Rudnev	United Russia	United Russia
23	Arkady Korolkov	United Russia	United Russia
24	Lyudmila Stebenkova	United Russia	United Russia
25	Yevgeny Selivyorstov	United Russia	United Russia
26	Stepan Orlov	United Russia	United Russia
27	Aleksandr Likhanov	United Russia	United Russia
28	Oleg Artemyev	United Russia	United Russia
29	Aleksey Kuchmin	United Russia	United Russia
30	Olga Melnikova	United Russia	United Russia
31	Lyudmila Guseva	United Russia	United Russia
32	Aleksandr Semennikov	United Russia	United Russia
33	Natalia Metlina	United Russia	United Russia
34	Yekaterina Razzakova	United Russia	United Russia
35	Anatoly Petrukovich	United Russia	United Russia
36	Aleksandr Kozlov	United Russia	United Russia
37	Valery Golovchenko	United Russia	United Russia
38	Maria Voropayeva (Note: resigned in September 2026 after being elected to the State Duma)	Independent	Liberal Democratic Party
38	TBD	TBD	TBD
39	Rodion Gazmanov	United Russia	United Russia
40	Tatyana Batysheva	United Russia	United Russia
41	Yevgeny Gerasimov	United Russia	United Russia
42	Irina Slutskaya	United Russia	United Russia
43	Svetlana Akulova	United Russia	United Russia
44	Aleksandr Davankov	New People	New People
45	Maksim Dzhetygenov	United Russia	United Russia

== See also ==
- Government of Moscow
- Administrative divisions of Moscow
- Charter of the city of Moscow
