= 1997 Moscow City Duma election =

1997 local government elections in Moscow, Russia

- 14 December 1997
- All 35 seats in the Moscow City Duma; 18 seats needed for a majority
- Turnout: 30.24% ▼22.30pp
Party	Seats
Pro-Administration	14
Democratic Majority (Pro-Administration)	12
Democratic Majority (Independent)	4
Independent	3
Opposition	2
This lists parties that won seats. See the complete results below.
Chairman of the City Duma before	Chairman of the City Duma after
Vladimir Platonov; Choice of Russia	Vladimir Platonov; Independent

The 1997 Moscow City Duma election was held December 14 of that year to the Moscow City Duma, the city's unicameral parliament (city council). The inaugural election for municipal councils in Moscow's raions was held on the same day.

Participating in the election were 28 associations and four electoral blocs.

== Background ==
In 1995, the deputies refused to schedule new elections and instead extended their term for a further two years. This provoked a two-year court case that ended in the summer of 1997 with a ruling that the Duma had acted illegally in extending its powers.

== Campaign ==
The "Nikolai Gonchar" bloc was the only bloc that adopted a platform critical of the way Mayor Yury Luzhkov ran the city. Among posters were "In this city, there should be a separation of powers, but the present Moscow City Duma is nothing but a pie with no filling". The bloc, which was set up by the "Our City" movement, the Moscow Association of Councils of Territorial and Social Self-Government, and the Moscow branch of the Democratic Party of Russia, included 33 candidates. The "My Moscow" bloc (CPRF, APR, ROS, Spiritual Heritage and People's Alliance) campaign stressed that "Muscovites support the Mayor's actions" and focused on solving the city's ecological and transportation problems.

Some days before the voting the city hall-owned newspaper Tverskaya 13 published a list of 35 candidates that were endorsed by the mayor. They won in all but 9 districts. The "Luzhkov list" had a partial overlap with a joint "democratic majority" list backed by NDR, DVR and Yabloko parties.

A total of 357 candidates ran in the election, of them 225 unaffiliated, 28 members of the outgoing City Duma and 59 women.

== Results ==
Party affiliation:
Independent (26)
Democratic Choice of Russia (3)
Yabloko (3)
Party of Constitutional Democrats (1)
Our Home – Russia (1)
"For Justice" bloc (1)

Elected deputies by district
District	Winner	Luzhkov	Democrat
1st	Sergey Goncharov (inc.)	No	No
2nd	Mikhail Moskvin-Tarkhanov (inc.)	Yes	Yes
3rd	Nikolay Moskovchenko (inc.)	No	No
4th	Igor Antonov	No	No
5th	Sergey Osadchy (inc.)	Yes	No
6th	Irina Rukina (inc.)	Yes	Yes
7th	Galina Khovanskaya (inc.)	Yes	Yes
8th	Vladimir Vasilyev	Yes	No
9th	Yury Sharandin	Yes	No
10th	Ivan Novitsky (inc.)	Yes	Yes
11th	Aleksandr Krutov (inc.)	Yes	Yes
12th	Valentina Prisyazhnyuk (inc.)	Yes	No
13th	Vitaly Kovalevsky (inc.)	No	Yes
14th	Irina Osokina	No	Yes
15th	Oleg Muzyrya	Yes	No
16th	Sergey Loktionov	Yes	No
17th	Lyudmila Stebenkova (inc.)	Yes	Yes
18th	Gennady Lobok	Yes	No
19th	Igor Lisinenko	Yes	No
20th	Andrey Voykov	Yes	No
21st	Stepan Orlov	Yes	Yes
22nd	Yevgeny Balashov (inc.)	Yes	Yes
23rd	Viktor Dvurechenskikh	Yes	No
24th	Oleg Bocharov	Yes	No
25th	Dmitry Katayev (inc.)	No	Yes
26th	Mikhail Vyshegorodtsev	Yes	No
27th	Andrey Shirokov	Yes	No
28th	Vladimir Plotnikov (inc.)	Yes	Yes
29th	Vladimir Platonov (inc.)	Yes	Yes
30th	Alevtina Nikitina (inc.)	Yes	Yes
31st	Yury Zagrebnoy	No	No
32nd	Yevgeny Bunimovich	No	Yes
33rd	Vladimir Katushenok (inc.)	Yes	Yes
34th	Konstantin Solovyov	No	No
35th	Zinaida Dragunkina	Yes	No
