= Aleksey Ryabinin =

Russian entrepeneur

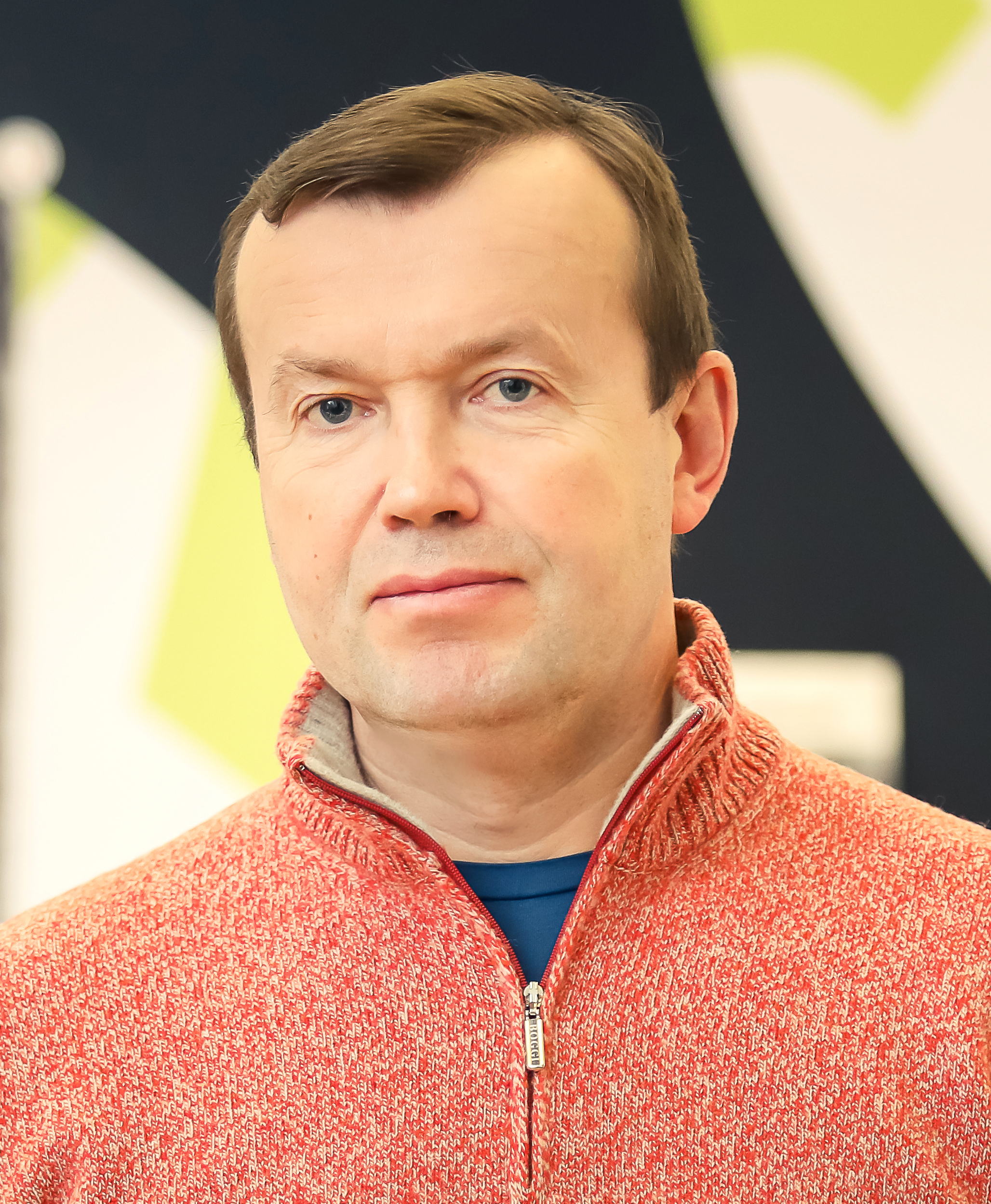
- Born: April 3, 1970 (age 56); Murom, Vladimir Oblast
- Occupations: economist, politician, writer

Aleksey Valerievich Ryabinin (Russian: Алексей Валерьевич Рябинин, born April 3, 1970) is a Russian Public Ombudsman for Copyright and Intellectual Property. Russian economist, politician and writer. Member of the Moscow City Parliament (2009–2014), a member of Russian Journalist Union.

== Biography ==
Aleksey Ryabinin was born on April 3, 1970, in Murom, Vladimir Region. In 1993 he graduated from Moscow Institute of Physics and Technology. In 1996 Ryabinin graduated as PhD in economics.

In 1998–2009 – CEO in Institute of Industrial Economics and Management (Moscow, Russia). Chief editor of journal "Russian Industrial Politics".

In 2009–2015 – a Member of the Moscow City Parliament, a Head of Committee of Economics and Science.

Since 2015 – a Member of Council of "Business Russia Association" ("Деловая Россия"), a Head of Committee of Publishing. Public Ombudsman for Copyright and Intellectual Property.

A member of Russian Journalist Union and International Federation of Journalists.

== Public and scientific activities ==
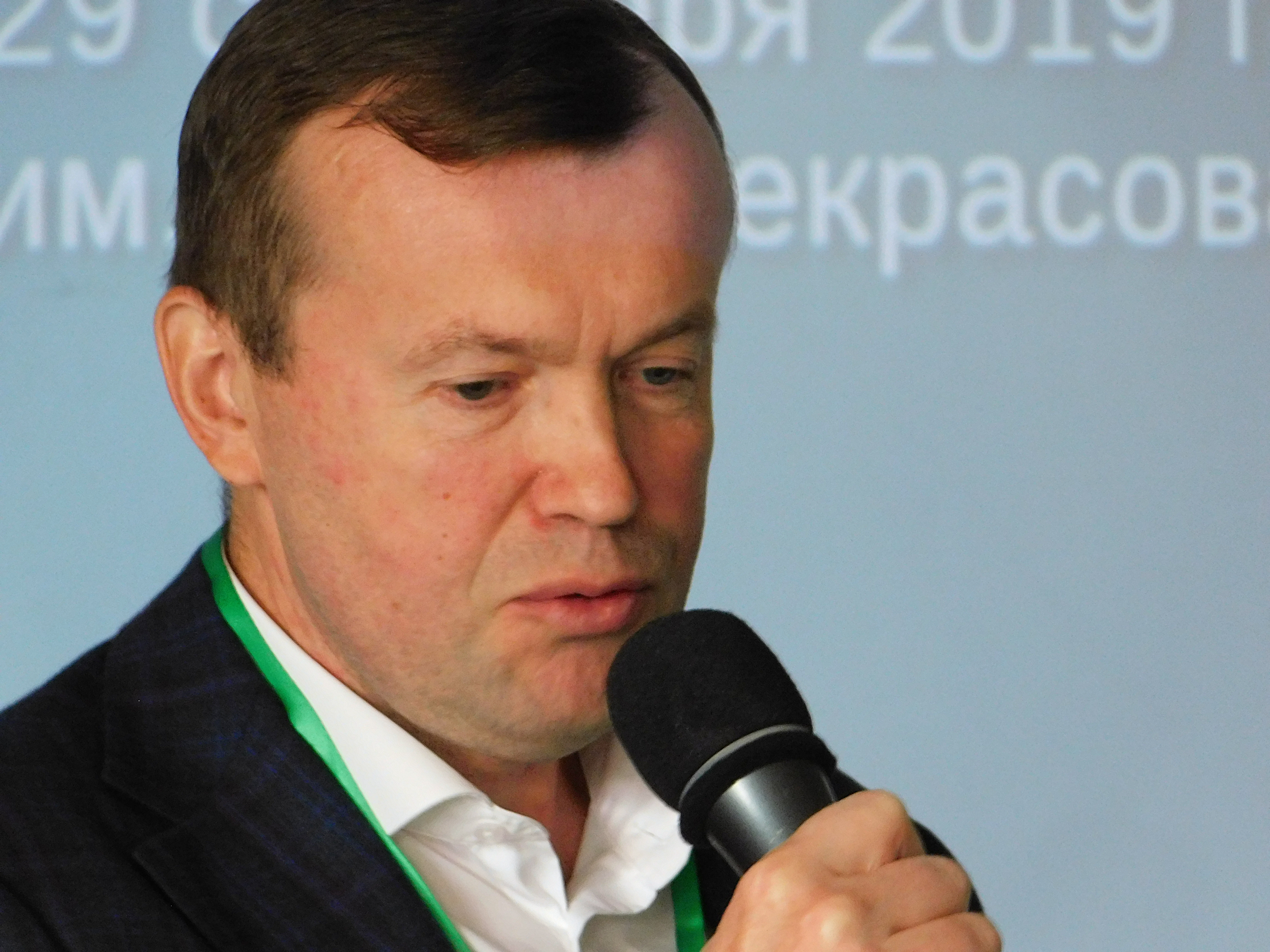
A.Ryabinin at Moscow Wiki-Conference 2019

Aleksey Ryabinin is the author of many articles about economic development, industrial and scientific progress and innovations. Chairman of the editorial board of scientific journals "Industrial Policy in the Russian Federation" (since 2007) and "The Municipalities in the Russian Federation". The work of A.Ryabinin on labor relations and social partnership (2002) is included as a compulsory literature of the course on labor law at the Russian Universities. In the monograph "The Development of the Scientific and Technical Potential of Moscow" (2012) A.Ryabinin, as noted by other researchers, proved that abandoning the movement towards a new urban economy and investing in the technological development of Moscow in the future may lead to a narrowing of the "window of opportunity" for development. In 2001–2002, under the general editorship of A.Ryabinin, the two-volume scientific encyclopedia "All Russia" on settlements and regions of the Russian Federation was published.

Alexey Ryabinin was elected as a deputy of the Moscow municipal parliament (2004 and 2008) and a deputy of the Moscow City Parliament (2009). Member of the Board of Business Russia Association. Ombudsman for Copyright and Intellectual Property, Member of the Russian Philosophical Society. Central Council Member of the Russian Society of Innovators and Inventors, Member of the Union of Journalists of Russia.

== Literary works ==
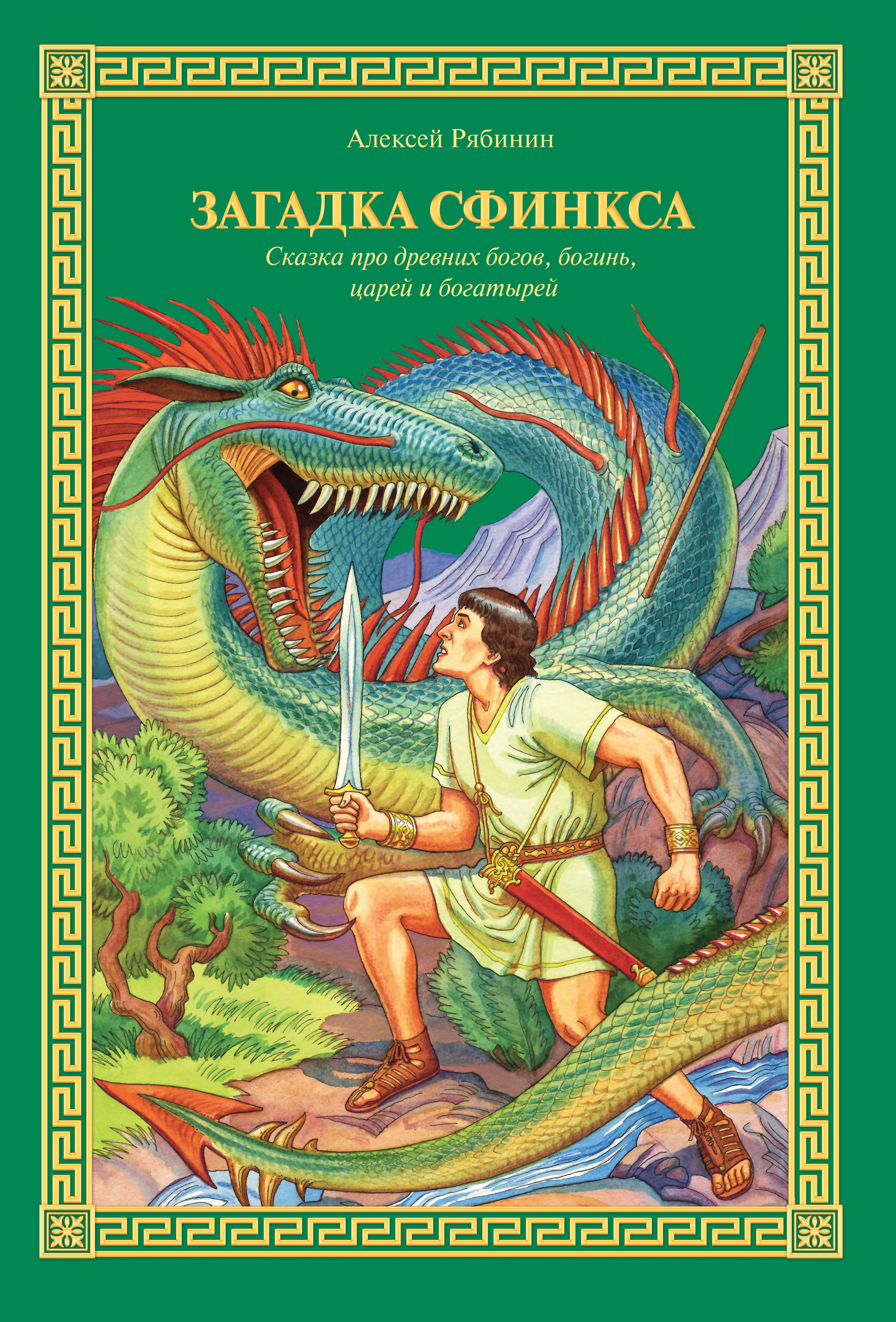
"Riddle of the Sphinx"

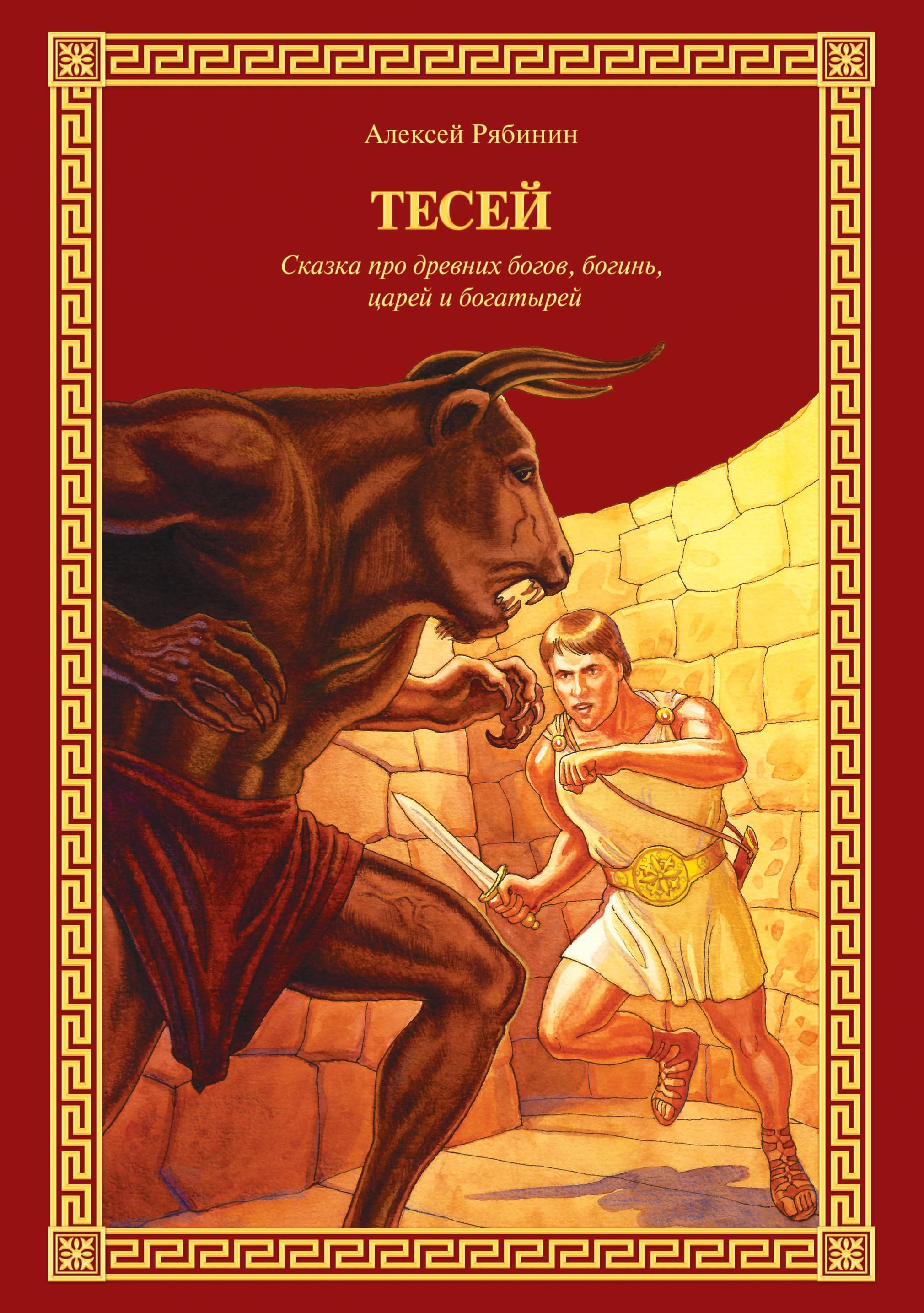
"Theseus" (A.Ryabinin)

Aleksey Ryabinin is the author of several books for children. "Riddle of the Sphinx", "Theseus", "Apple of Discord". The books written on the plots of Ancient Greek mythology.

In 2017 his book for children "The Apple of Discord" was published, in which the ancient myths and legends about the history of the Trojan War were retold in an accessible form. The book received numerous positive reviews. It was compared with the books of Russian classics as "a new interpretation of the ancient Greek cultural heritage in the context of the challenges of the 21st century". The fascination of presentation and ease of reading were noted. At the beginning of 2018, the book "The Apple of Discord" was awarded the Ernest Hemingway Literary Prize for 2017 in the nomination "Children's Prose". In 2018 Aleksey Ryabinin published his second book in the genre of ancient mythology for children, "Theseus", about the adventures of one of the central figures of ancient mythology – Theseus. The book also received positive reviews in the press. In 2019 another children's book published on the theme of ancient mythology – "Riddle of the Sphinx".

Several theatrical shows came out from Ryabinin's books, which received good reviews in the press.

In 2019 Russian Academy of Theatre Arts and Astrakhan Theater released his play of the "Game of the Gods" (A.Ryabinin and E.Isaeva). The play received the prize of modern drama of the Ministry of Culture of Russia.

The characters of Ryabinin's books are the heroes of ancient mythology Theseus, Oedipus, Diomedes, Athena, Zeus, Dionysus, Antigone and many others.
