= Moscow City Duma District 24 =

Moscow City Duma electoral constituency

- Moscow City Duma constituency
- Deputy: Lyudmila Stebenkova; United Russia
- Administrative Okrug: South-Eastern
- Districts: Pechatniki, Tekstilshchiki, Yuzhnoportovy
- Voters: 156,227 (2024)

Moscow City Duma District 24 is one of 45 constituencies in Moscow City Duma. Currently the district covers inner parts of South-Eastern Moscow.

The district has been represented since 2024 by United Russia deputy Lyudmila Stebenkova, an eight-term member, who was redistricted from District 25.

== Boundaries ==
District boundaries from 2014 to 2024

1993–1997: Chertanovo Severnoye, Chertanovo Tsentralnoye, Chertanovo Yuzhnoye
The district covered all three raions of Chertanovo in Southern Moscow.

1997–2005: Nagorny, Chertanovo Severnoye, Chertanovo Tsentralnoye
The district continued to cover parts of Southern Moscow, switching Chertanovo Yuzhnoye for Nagorny District with District 21.

2005–2014: constituency abolished
Prior to the 2005 election the number of constituencies was reduced to 15, so the district was eliminated.

2014–2024: Lefortovo, Nizhegorodsky, Tekstilshchiki, Yuzhnoportovy
The district was created prior to the 2014 election, after Moscow City Duma had been expanded from 35 to 45 seats. It covers inner parts of South-Eastern Moscow.

2024–present: Pechatniki, Tekstilshchiki, Yuzhnoportovy
During the 2023–24 Moscow redistricting the district was split in half, losing Lefortovo and Nizhegorodsky District to District 23; in return it gained Pechatniki from the former District 25.

== Members elected ==
Election	Member	Party
1993	Anatoly Korotich	Choice of Russia
1997	Oleg Bocharov	Our Home – Russia
2001	Oleg Bocharov	Independent
2005	Constituency eliminated	
2009	Constituency eliminated	
2014	Zoya Zotova	United Russia
2019	Pavel Tarasov	Communist Party
2024	Lyudmila Stebenkova	United Russia

== Election results ==
=== 2001 ===
Summary of the 16 December 2001 Moscow City Duma election in District 24
Candidate	Party	Votes	%
Oleg Bocharov (incumbent)	Independent	47,516	80.24%
Aleksandr Strizhanov	Independent	5,025	8.49%
against all		5,596	9.45%
Total		60,057	100%

=== 2014 ===
Summary of the 14 September 2014 Moscow City Duma election in District 24
Candidate	Party	Votes	%
Zoya Zotova	United Russia	15,922	40.42%
Pavel Tarasov	Communist Party	10,314	26.18%
Vladimir Zotov	A Just Russia	5,163	13.11%
Tatyana Ovcharenko	Yabloko	3,434	8.72%
Roman Protasov	Liberal Democratic Party	1,917	4.87%
Sergey Kim	Independent	1,270	3.22%
Total		39,396	100%

=== 2019 ===
Summary of the 8 September 2019 Moscow City Duma election in District 24
Candidate	Party	Votes	%
Pavel Tarasov	Communist Party	15,603	38.99%
Igor Dyagilev	Independent	13,241	33.08%
Nikolay Sheremetyev	Liberal Democratic Party	3,105	7.76%
Anton Tarasov	Independent	2,975	7.43%
Yekaterina Abramenko	A Just Russia	2,565	6.41%
Aleksey Balabutkin	Communists of Russia	1,095	2.74%
Total		40,023	100%

=== 2024 ===
Summary of the 6–8 September 2024 Moscow City Duma election in District 24
Candidate	Party	Votes	%
Lyudmila Stebenkova (incumbent) (Note: redistricted from District 25)	United Russia	31,735	50.06%
Anton Malyshev	New People	10,697	16.87%
Sergey Bagyan	Liberal Democratic Party	5,462	8.62%
Eduard Lyutikov	Communist Party	5,042	7.95%
Konstantin Butyrev	A Just Russia – For Truth	3,791	5.98%
Viktoria Mentyukova	Communists of Russia	3,358	5.30%
Aleksandr Vlasov	The Greens	3,298	5.20%
Total		63,400	100%
