= Charter of the city of Moscow =

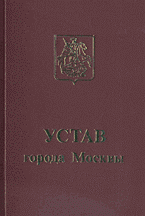

Overview
- Original title: Устав города Москвы
- Jurisdiction: Federal city of Moscow
- Ratified: 28 June 1995
- Date effective: 1 August 1995
- Head of state: Mayor
- Chambers: Unicameral (Moscow City Duma)

Full text
- Устав города Москвы at Wikisource

The Charter of the City of Moscow (Russian: Устав города Москвы) is the basic law of the federal city and capital of Russia, Moscow. In the hierarchy of normative acts of the city, the charter has supreme legal force: other city laws and other regulations should not contradict the charter, and in the case of such a conflict, the charter is the supreme.

== History ==
Preparation of the Charter of Moscow began even before the adoption of the current Constitution of the Russian Federation in December 1993.

The Decree of the Supreme Soviet of the Russian Federation on April 15, 1993 № 4803-I, which give effect to the Russian Federation Law "On the status of the capital of the Russian Federation", contained instructions

Council of People's Deputies of the city of Moscow to draft the charter of the city of Moscow, within three months from the date of enactment of the Law of the Russian Federation "On the status of the capital of the Russian Federation".

In order dated September 10, 1993 № 5707-I Supreme Soviet approved the special provisions on the procedure for agreeing on a draft charter of the city of Moscow, its amendments and additions to the Supreme Soviet of the Russian Federation and the President of the Russian Federation determines the order to harmonize the provisions of the Charter relating to the implementation functions of the capital Moscow Russia, with federal authorities.

Also in the Presidential Decree of 10 December 1993 N 2125 "On general principles of administrative-territorial division and organization of local government in Moscow" contained the phrase "... prior to the adoption of the Charter of the City of Moscow."

After the adoption of the 1993 Constitution, the Charter of the preparation work has intensified. January 10, 1994 Moscow Mayor shall issue an order number 15-RM "On the extension of the draft Charter of the City of Moscow", which approved the composition of the working committee for the preparation of the Charter and invited the Commission to submit to the Moscow Government draft statute by July 1994

Shakhnovskii was appointed head of the commission while managing director of Moscow City Administration, later - one of the owners of NK "YUKOS"; Deputy Head - AV Petrov, then Deputy Premier of the Government of Moscow, and then (to 2008) - Deputy Mayor of Moscow, plenipotentiary representative of Mayor in the Moscow City Duma, which in 2006 became the first honorary award Mosgordumy "For merits in the development of legislation and parliamentary system", including, and active participation in the development of the Charter of the city. The Commission consisted mainly of officials of city and regional levels, but were among its members and prominent lawyers - experts in constitutional law professor SA Avakyan and VV Lazarev.

Draft Statutes of the city charter was developed, and on March 15, 1995 Moscow City Council adopted Resolution №18 "On the order of adoption of the Charter of the City of Moscow", which established that the charter must be submitted to the Moscow City Duma, up to March 22, 1995, and the beginning the draft in the first reading to be held March 29, 1995 was set a monthly deadline for amendments to the basis adopted in the first reading the draft and after the draft Charter as a basis in the first reading, it was decided to conduct a citywide discussion of the main provisions of the draft.

The draft was adopted in the first reading of the draft was published for discussion in the official citywide Moscow newspaper "Tver, 13», № 17 dated April 27, 1995.

On June 28, 1995 Moscow City Duma adopted in the final reading Moscow Law "Charter of the City of Moscow", which is on the same day was signed Yuri Luzhkov.

On July 7, 1995 Moscow City Council adopted Resolution № 44 "On introduction of the Charter of the City of Moscow", which states that the Charter entered into force on August 1, 1995.

== Literature ==
- Петров А.В.; Денисов Г.И.; Лебедев Д.А.; Балытников В.В.; Карташов И.М. (2002). Комментарий к Уставу города Москвы. М.: НОРМА. ISBN 5-89123-651-6.
