= Yabloko-United Democrats =

Political coalition in Russia

Yabloko — United Democrats Яблоко — Объединённые демократы
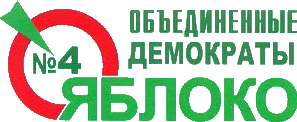
- Leader: Grigory Yavlinsky; Nikita Belykh
- №1 in Party List: Ivan Novitsky
- Founded: September 25, 2005
- Dissolved: December 4, 2005
- Headquarters: 31/2nd building, Pyatnitskaya Street, Moscow, Russia. 119017
- Ideology: Social liberalism Liberal conservatism Green politics Pro-Europeanism
- Political position: Centre-left to Centre-right
- Member parties: Yabloko; Union of Right Forces; Party of Soldiers' Mothers; Union of Greens of Russia
- Colours: Green; Blue
- Slogan: "Freedom and justice!" (Russian: "Свобода и справедливость!")
- Seats in the Moscow City Duma 4th Convocation (2005–2009): 3 / 35

Website
- yabloko.ru (Yabloko) sps.ru (Union of Right Forces)

The Yabloko — United Democrats (Russian: Яблоко — Объединённые демократы; Yabloko — Obyedinonnyye demokraty) was a coalition between Yabloko party and the Union of Right Forces. They were formed initially for the Moscow municipal elections on December 4, 2005.

During the campaign, the coalition declared its opposition to the policies of President Vladimir Putin and called for the restoration of political and media freedoms, curtailed by the Putin administration. Yabloko-United Democrats won 11% of the vote and became one of only three parties (along with United Russia and the Communist Party) to enter the new Moscow City Duma. Its deputies in the Duma are Yevgeny Bunimovich (Yabloko), Sergey Mitrokhin (Yabloko) and Ivan Novitsky (Union of Right Forces).

== Electoral results ==
=== Moscow City Duma elections ===
Election	Lead candidate	Performance					Rank	Government
Election	Lead candidate	Votes	%	± pp	Seats	+/–	Rank	Government
2005	Ivan Novitsky	266,295	11.11%	New	3 / 35	New	▲3rd	Minority
