= Vladimir Ulas =

Russian politician

- Владимир Улас
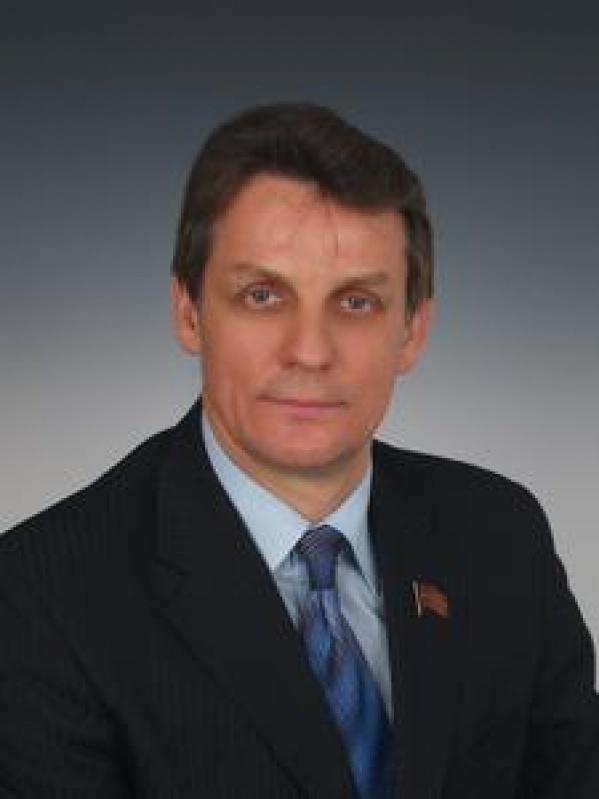
- Ulas, c. 2005

Member of the State Duma
- In office 2007–2011

Personal details
- Born: Vladimir Dmitrievich Ulas; 13 April 1960 (age 65); Baranovichi, Byelorussian SSR, Soviet Union
- Political party: Communist Party of the Russian Federation

Vladimir Dmitrievich Ulas (Russian: Владимир Дмитриевич Улас; born 1960, Baranovichi, Byelorussian SSR) is a Russian politician from the Communist Party of the Russian Federation and a colonel in the Russian Air Force. The head of the Communist Party of the Russian Federation's Moscow committee since 2004. He was elected as a representative of the State Duma in 2007.

== Military training ==
Ulas graduated from with a Gold Medal from the Higher Military Aviation Engineering College in Riga in 1982, after which he went on to study at the Faculty of Computational Mathematics and Cybernetics of Moscow State University. Between 1985 - 2004 Ulas was teaching science at the Air Force Engineering Academy. In 1999 Vladimir Ulas was awarded the rank of colonel in the Armed Forces of Russia.

== Political career ==
Ulas joined the Communist Party of the Soviet Union in 1981. After the fall of the Soviet Union in 1991 when the Communist Party was banned by Boris Yeltsin, Ulas became a prominent member of Gennady Ziuganov's new Communist Party of the Russian Federation. In July 2004 he was elected first secretary of the Party's Moscow City Committee, and in 2005 he was elected deputy of the Moscow City Duma. Since 2007 he is a member of the State Duma, he was elected to the 5th State Duma.

In 2011 he became permanent expert of the information and analytical portal "Communists of the capital".
