= Evgeny Bunimovich =

Russian poet

- Евгений Бунимович
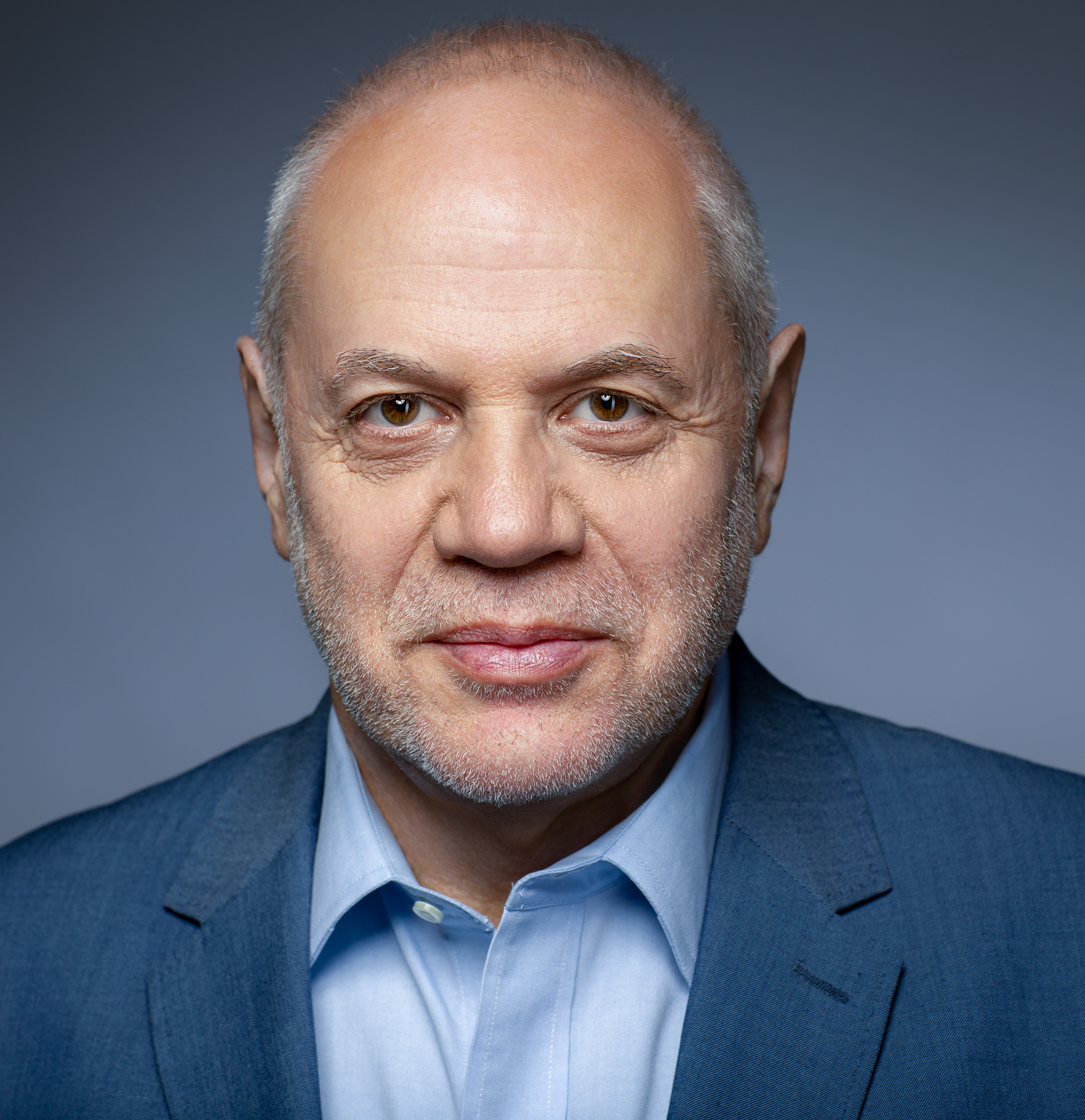
- Bunimovich in 2019

Member of Moscow City Duma
- In office 8 September 2019 – 1 August 2024
- Preceded by: Nadezhda Babkina
- In office 14 December 1997 – 1 September 2009

Personal details
- Born: 27 May 1954 (age 72) Moscow, Soviet Union
- Party: Yabloko
- Education: Moscow State University
- Occupation: Poet, publicist, politician, human right activist
- Awards: Ordre des Palmes académiques Honoured Teacher of Russia; Presidential Letter of Gratitude; Moscow Account

Evgeny Abramovich Bunimovich (Russian: Евгений Абрамович Бунимович; born 27 May 1954) is a Russian Poet, teacher, journalist, human rights activist and public figure. Deputy of the Moscow City Duma of the II, III, IV, VII convocations, Chairman of the Education Commission, Commissioner for Children's Rights in Moscow (2009-2019). He is a member of the political committee of the Yabloko party.

== Biography ==
Born in Moscow. His father, Abram Bunimovich was a Professor of Moscow State University. His mother was mathematics teacher Raisa Bunimovich. His brother is a Doctor of Physical and Mathematical Sciences Leonid Bunimovich, and has lived in the USA since the early 1990s.

In 1970 he graduated from Moscow Physics and Mathematics School No. 2 (now - Lyceum "Second School"). In 1975 he graduated from the Mechanics and Mathematics Department of Lomonosov Moscow State University. Candidate of Pedagogical Sciences (Dissertation topic "Methodological system for studying probabilistic-statistical material in basic school", 2004). From 1976 to 2007 he worked as a mathematics teacher, head of the Department of Mathematics, Physics, Computer Science of Experimental Gymnasium No. 710 of the USSR Academy of Pedagogical Sciences. From 1986 to 2001 he was a Vice-President of the Russian Association of Mathematics Teachers. From 2002 to 2006 he was a member of the Presidium of the Federal Expert Council on Education. Since 2012 he is member of the Federal Scientific and Methodological Council for the State Final Attestation (GIA) in Mathematics.

Editor-in-chief of the scientific and methodological journals "Mathematics at School", "Mathematics for Schoolchildren" (since 2009), and the electronic journal "Fractal" (2012-2016). Author of many school textbooks, problem books, and teaching aids on mathematics, as well as articles on education and upbringing. Initiator of the inclusion of the probability-statistical line in the school mathematics curriculum in the country.

Honoured Teacher of Russia (1995), laureate of the Russian Federation Government Prize in Education (2006).

In 1997, was elected to the Moscow City Duma (Yabloko-United Democrats faction), starting the election campaign after a personal conversation with Grigory Yavlinsky. By his own admission, he went into politics under the influence of Yuri Shchekochikhin, with whom he was friends.

From 1997 to 2009 and from 2019 to 2024 he served as Deputy of the Moscow City Duma of the II, III, IV, VII convocations. From 1997 to 2001 he was Coordinator for Culture, Art and Education of the Moscow City Duma. From 2001 to 2009 he served as Chairman of the Commission on Science and Education of the Moscow City Duma, Deputy. Chairman of the Commission on Culture of the Moscow City Duma. From 2019 to 2024 he was Chairman of the Commission on Education of the Moscow City Duma.

One of the authors of Moscow laws on the development of education, on vocational education, on the education of children with disabilities, on the protection of historical and cultural monuments, on a barrier-free environment for the disabled, etc. Initiator of the Days of Historical and Cultural Heritage in Moscow (since 2000). Initiator of the creation of the Human Rights Commission under the Mayor of Moscow (2004), and then the adoption of the Law on the Human Rights Commissioner in Moscow and the creation of a corresponding structure (2009).

From 2009 to 2019 he was the Commissioner for Children's Rights in Moscow.

From 2012 to 2015 he was the Chairman of the Coordination Council of the Commissioners for Children's Rights of the Central Federal District of the Russian Federation. From 2012 to 2018 he was a Member of the Expert Council under the Government of the Russian Federation.

From 2018 to 2021 he was a member of the Council under the President of the Russian Federation for the implementation of state policy in the field of family and child protection.
