= Aleksei Shaposhnikov (politician) =

Russian politician

- Алексей Шапошников

Chairman of the Moscow City Duma
- Incumbent
- Assumed office 24 September 2014
- President: Vladimir Putin
- Governor: Sergey Sobyanin
- Preceded by: Vladimir Platonov

Personal details
- Born: Aleksei Valerievich Shaposhnikov; June 16, 1973 (age 53) Moscow, Russian SFSR, Soviet Union
- Citizenship: Soviet; Russian
- Party: United Russia
- Education: Moscow State Law Academy
- Occupation: Politician

Aleksei Valerievich Shaposhnikov (Russian: Алексей Валерьевич Шапошников; born 16 June 1973) is a Russian politician who has served as the chairman of the Moscow City Duma since 2014.

== Biography ==
Aleksei Valerievich Shaposhnikov was born on 16 June 1973 in Moscow. Father — Valery Shaposhnikov, Moscow City Duma Deputy 4-th and 5-th convocations.

== Chairman of the Moscow City Duma ==
During the elections to the Moscow city Duma 6-th convocation, held in September 2014, ran from Moscow branch of the party "United Russia", and this time won the election in his single-mandate constituency № 12. On September 24 the first meeting of the Duma 6-th convocation deputies adopted a resolution "On election of the Chairman of the Moscow city Duma", and A. V. Shaposhnikov was elected to this position (according to the regulations, he will lead the work of the Council during the whole validity term of its powers). In his speech after his election as the new speaker promised that the Moscow city Duma will be encouraged to debate different political forces, and representatives of all factions will be heard.

== Controversy ==
=== Election errors ===
On 26 December 2018 deputy Elena Shuvalova during the meeting of the Moscow City Duma noticed that the voting system is registering the votes of the deputies incorrectly. Deputy Shuvalova noted that there were 36 votes registered in the system while she could only count 26 deputies on the floor. In reply to her request to count the deputies chairman Shaposhnikov noted that there is a "special system which counts the deputies on the floor" and "he fully trusts it". In response that it's working incorrectly, he noted that the system fully supports the legislative work of the Duma. The official video recording provided by the City Duma did not show the actual deputies on the floor.

=== Sanctions ===
Due to the ongoing Russo–Ukrainian War, Shaposhnikov was placed under European Union and Swiss sanctions list in December 2023.

== Electoral history ==
2014 Moscow City Duma election (12th constituency)
Candidate	Votes	%
Alexei Shaposhnikov	16,801	50.65%
Evgenii Marchenko	5,590	16.85%
Vladimir Khodakov	3,286	9.91%
Aleksandr Sapranov	2,010	6.06%
Tatiana Fokina	1,875	5.65%
Lidia Tafintseva	1,607	4.84%

2019 Moscow City Duma election (12th constituency)
Candidate	Party	Votes	%
Alexei Shaposhnikov	United Russia	14,227	42.16%
Alexander Efimov	CPRF	13,087	38.78%
Maxim Efimov	LDPR	2,613	7.74%
Nikita Yankovoy	A Just Russia	2,358	6.98%
Pavel Trofimov	Communists of Russia	1,463	4.34%
