= Inna Svyatenko =

Russian politician (born 1967)

- Инна Святенко
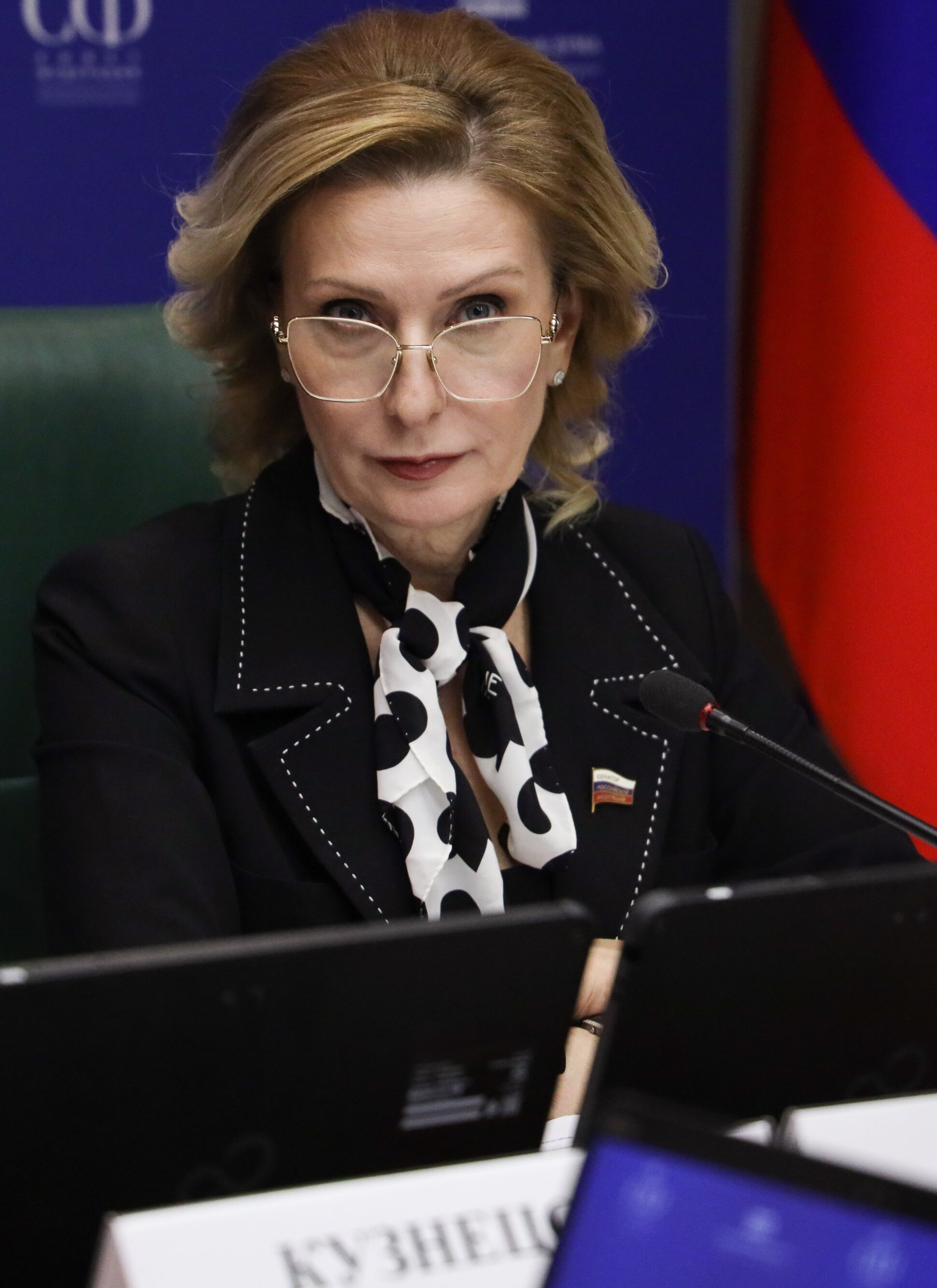

Russian Federation Senator from Moscow
- Incumbent
- Assumed office 19 September 2019 Serving with Vladimir Kozhin
- Preceded by: Zinaida Dragunkina

Chair of the Federation Council Committee on Social Policy
- Incumbent
- Assumed office 30 January 2020
- Preceded by: Valeriy Ryazanskiy

Member of the Moscow City Duma
- In office 16 December 2001 – 19 September 2019

Personal details
- Born: Inna Svyatenko; 6 September 1967 (age 59) Taganrog, Russian SFSR, Soviet Union (now Russia)
- Party: United Russia
- Education: Moscow State University, Russian Presidential Academy of National Economy and Public Administration

Inna Yuryevna Svyatenko (Russian: Инна Юрьевна Святенко; born 6 September 1967) is a Russian politician, who serves as Russian Federation Senator from Moscow since 2019. She previously served as a member of the Moscow City Duma from 2001 to 2019.

== Biography ==
Svyatenko was born on 6 September 1967 in Taganrog. Her father is Yuri Rodionov, then a military general and went on to become a member of the State Duma.

In 1989, she graduated from the MSU Faculty of Computational Mathematics and Cybernetics. In 2003, she also got a degree from the Russian Presidential Academy of National Economy and Public Administration.

In 1989, Svyatenko began working at the Zhukovsky – Gagarin Air Force Academy where she later became a docent.

Following the fall of the communist system, she became politically active. Svyatenko campaigned for the Unity party, becoming Secretary of its Moscow branch's Expert Council, responsible for socio-political affairs. She successfully ran for a seat on the Moscow City Duma in 2001, upon the Unity party's merger into United Russia. She was re-elected in 2005, 2009, 2014 and 2019.

On 19 September 2019, she City Duma appointed her as one of Moscow's two representatives on the Federation Council. In 30 January 2020, she became the chair of the council's Committee on Social Policy. In February 2022, she effectively voted to recognise the independence of the Donetsk and Lugansk people's republics from Ukraine, for which she was placed under sanctions by the United States, Canada, the European Union, Switzerland, Australia, New Zealand and Ukraine itself.
