= Maryino District =

- District
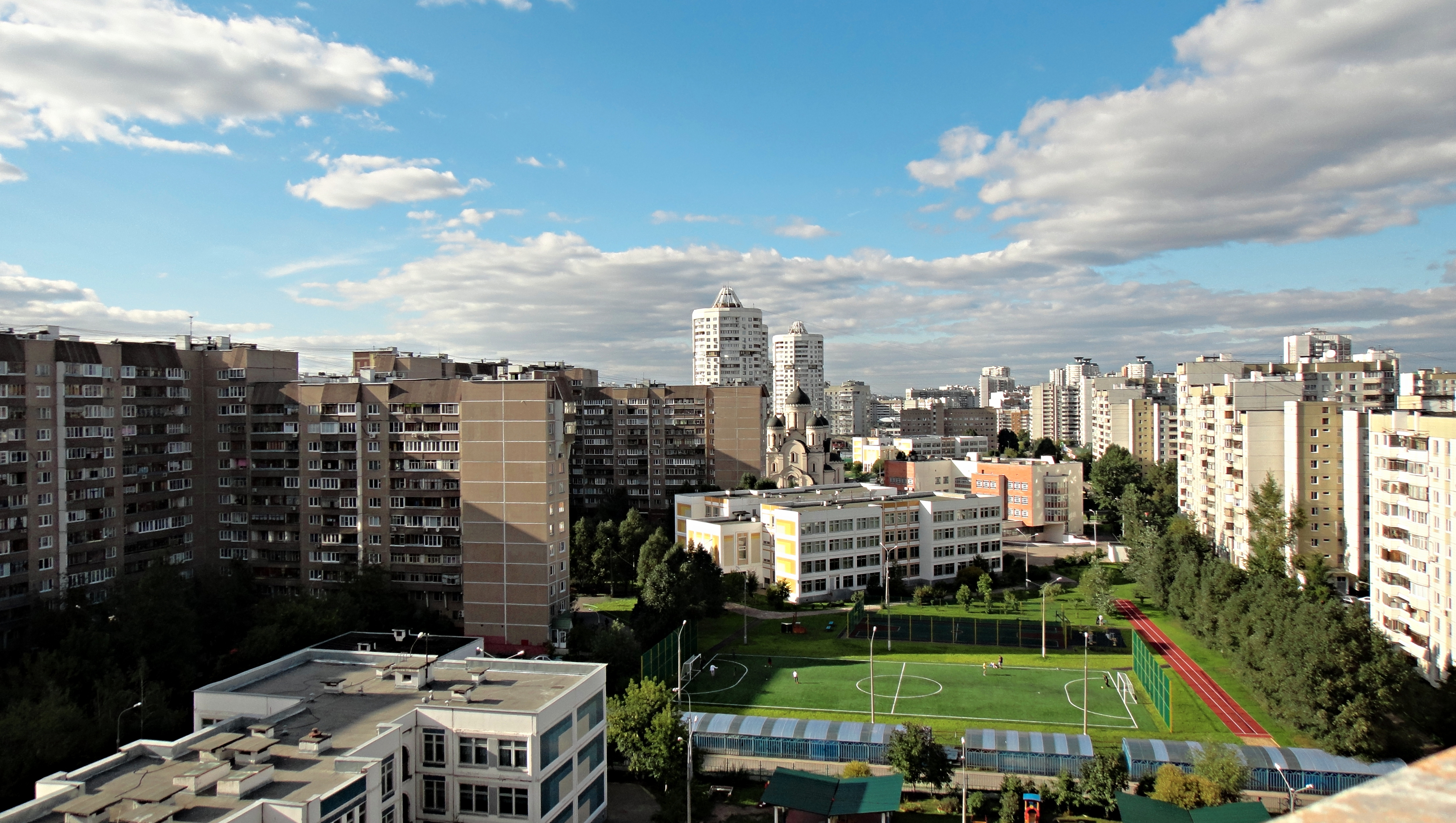
- Residential buildings, Maryino District

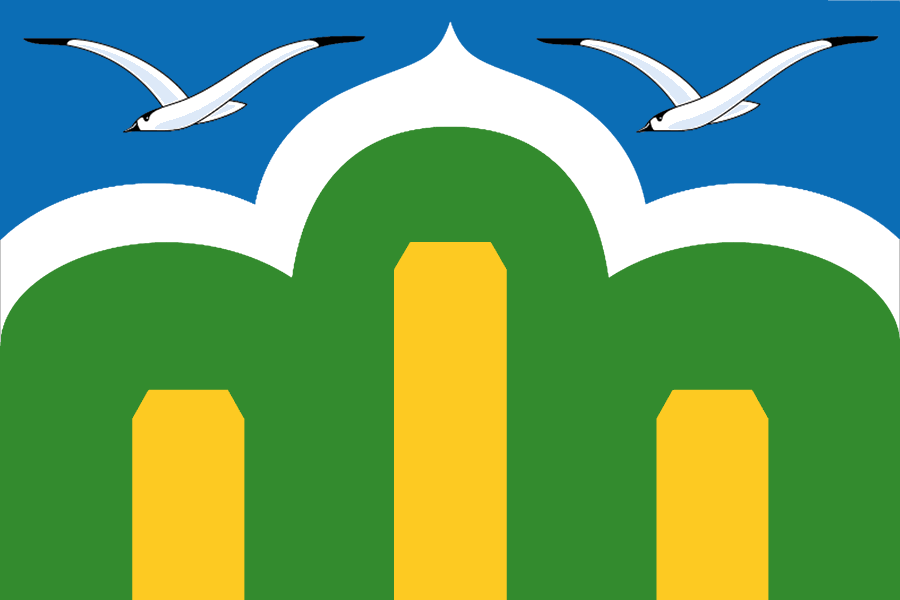
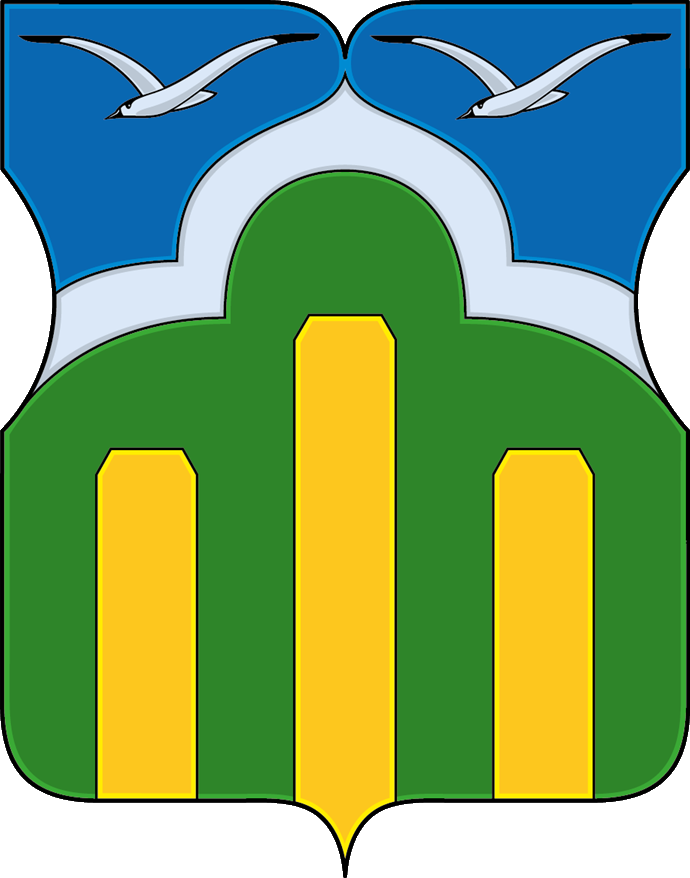
- Flag Coat of arms
- Location of Maryino District in the City of Moscow
- Coordinates: 55°38′59″N 37°44′33″E
- Country: Russia
- Federal subject: Moscow

Area
  - Total: 11.917 km^{2} (4.601 sq mi)

Population
  - Estimate (2017): 252,597
- Time zone: UTC+
- OKTMO ID: 45390000
- Website: http://marino.mos.ru/

Maryino (Russian: район Марьино) is a district of South-Eastern Administrative Okrug of the federal city of Moscow, Russia. Its area is 11.917 square kilometres (4.601 mi^{2}). Population: 252,597 (2017 est.); 247,479 (2010 census); 206,388 (2002 census). It is the most populated district of Moscow.

== History ==
In the early 12th–13th centuries, the area of the modern district was where the village of Maryino stood near Chaginskoye Marshes. The district's name dates back to that village, which itself was called after Mariya Yaroslavna, mother of Tsar Ivan III, who founded the village.

The first settlers appeared in these places back in the 12th century. From that time, the burial mounds of the Vyatichi Slavs and the remains of the settlement have survived. Moreover, the name of the Goledyanka river gives reason to assume that before the Slavs the Golyad Baltic tribe lived here.

On the territory of the district there, is a monument of the late Middle Ages (XIV-XVII centuries) that requires research - a settlement in the former Maryina village.

The Maryino district was named after the village of Maryino, which was previously located on its outskirts, apparently named after Princess Maria Yaroslavna, the mother of Ivan III, who organized the settlement. The village was located in the north-west of the current district, at the intersection of Pererva and Podolskaya streets, and was part of the Kolomna state volost.

The scribe book of 1644, in which Maryino was first mentioned, shows 9 courtyards in the village. In the middle of the 19th century. There were 31 people in the village.

Between 1892 and 1898, Lyublino Aeration Fields, a gigantic wastewater treatment plant for the city, were built on the site of the Chaginsky swamp in this area. The fields occupied an area of over one thousand hectares. In 1911, the Moscow sewage system won a Golden Prize in Brussels. After the Kuryanovo Aeration System had been built in 1978 some two miles to the Northwest, it was decided to use the territory of the former Lyublino Fields for construction of new apartment buildings.

As Moscow grew in later years, the territory became incorporated as Maryino District of Moscow.

In 1996, two metro stations were opened in the district.
