= 2014 Moscow City Duma election =

- 11 October 2014
- Turnout: 21.04%
	First party	Second party
Party	United Russia	CPRF
Last election	32 seats	3 seats
Seats won	38	5
Seat change	▲6	▲2
Percentage	54.18%	18.65%
	Third party	Fourth party
Party	LDPR	Rodina
Last election	0 seats	0 seats
Seats won	1	1
Seat change	▲1	▲1
Percentage	6.64%	5.48%
- Results of the election by district

The election for the 6th convocation of the Moscow City Duma took place on 14 September 2014, which coincided with the United Voting Day. The elections were conducted using the first-past-the-post voting system, and a total of 45 deputies were elected in 45 single-member constituencies (previously, the Duma had 35 deputies) from a pool of 258 candidates. The term for the new Duma was set at five years. The voting process occurred across more than 3,500 polling stations throughout the city. The final results of the election were announced on September 16, 2014.

Out of the elected deputies, 17 individuals were re-elected from the previous City Duma. Following the tabulation of 100% of the ballots, the leading vote-getters included 28 candidates nominated by the United Russia party, 5 candidates from the Communist Party, 1 candidate from the Liberal Democratic Party, 1 candidate from Rodina, and 10 self-nominees who were supported by United Russia.

== Background ==
The 2014 elections to the Moscow City Duma introduced several notable changes compared to previous elections:

1. Shift to a single-mandate system: A transition was made from a mixed electoral system to a fully single-mandate system for voting in the Moscow City Duma. This system had been previously used from 1993 to 2001. The number of deputies with reduced status increased, with three-quarters of them serving on a non-permanent basis. Furthermore, an initiative was implemented to allow individuals to hold both the position of a senator in the Federation Council representing Moscow and a Moscow City Duma deputy simultaneously.
2. Abolition of absentee certificates: Sergei Sobyanin proposed and implemented the abolition of absentee certificates for voting. However, this change coincided with the reintroduction of early voting in regional elections.
3. Primaries "My Moscow": The primaries called "My Moscow" took place, resulting in the nomination of only 32 United Russia candidates from its ranks in 45 districts. The remaining candidates were chosen from activists who participated in the primaries. Notably, in one district, "United Russia" did not nominate any candidate.
4. Introduction of video surveillance: In a first for the City Duma elections, video surveillance was employed. Cameras were installed at the polling stations to ensure transparency and monitor the voting process.

=== Rumors of early elections ===
In September 2013, Moscow's territorial election commissions began receiving information suggesting the possibility of postponing the elections from September to March 2014. The plan involved the dissolution of the Moscow State Duma of the 5th convocation in December 2013, although this did not ultimately occur.
