= Moscow City Duma District 19 =

Moscow City Duma electoral constituency

- Moscow City Duma constituency
- Deputy: Maya Bulayeva; United Russia
- Administrative Okrug: Eastern, South-Eastern
- Districts: Kosino-Ukhtomsky, Nekrasovka, part of Veshnyaki, part of Vykhino-Zhulebino
- Voters: 168,107 (2024)

Moscow City Duma District 19 is one of 45 constituencies in Moscow City Duma. Currently the district covers outer parts of Eastern and South-Eastern Moscow.

The district has been represented since 2024 by United Russia deputy Maya Bulayeva, a school principal, who flipped an open seat left by expelled one-term Independent member and foreign agent Yevgeny Stupin from District 20. (Note: Stupin was expelled from the Communist Party faction in April 2023)

== Boundaries ==
District boundaries from 2014 to 2024

1993–1997: Kapotnya, Lyublino, Maryino, Pechatniki
The district covered outer inner parts of South-Eastern Moscow.

1997–2001: Kapotnya, Lyublino, Maryino, TEOS Kuzminki Park
The district continued to cover outer parts of South-Eastern Moscow but lost Pechatniki to District 3.

2001–2005: Kapotnya, part of Lyublino, Maryino, TEOS Kuzminki Park (Note: merged into Lyublino District in 2002)
The district continued to cover outer parts of South-Eastern Moscow but lost part of Lyublino to District 17.

2005–2014: constituency abolished
Prior to the 2005 election the number of constituencies was reduced to 15, so the district was eliminated.

2014–2024: part of Ivanovskoye, Novogireyevo, part of Veshnyaki
The district was created prior to the 2014 election, after Moscow City Duma had been expanded from 35 to 45 seats. It covers parts of Eastern Moscow.

2024–present: Kosino-Ukhtomsky, Nekrasovka, part of Veshnyaki, part of Vykhino-Zhulebino
During the 2023–24 Moscow redistricting most of the former district was put into District 18 (part of Novogireyevo, most of Veshnyaki), while the rest was divided between districts 16 (part of Novogoreyevo), 17 (part of Ivanovskoye). In its new configuration the district retained only southeastern corner of Veshnyaki and took most of former District 20 (Kosino-Ukhtonmsky, Nekrasovka, part of Vykhino-Zhulebino).

== Members elected ==
Election	Member	Party
1993	Viktor Maksimov	Choice of Russia
1997	Igor Lisinenko (Note: elected to State Duma in December 1999)	Independent
2001	Sergey Turta	Independent
2005	Constituency eliminated	
2009	Constituency eliminated	
2014	Viktor Kruglyakov	United Russia
2019	Oleg Sheremetyev (Note: expelled in October 2020)	Communist Party
2021	Yelena Kats	United Russia
2024	Maya Bulayeva	United Russia

== Election results ==
=== 2001 ===
Summary of the 16 December 2001 Moscow City Duma election in District 19
Candidate	Party	Votes	%
Sergey Turta	Independent	36,789	55.90%
Yelizaveta Makarova	Independent	8,120	12.34%
Yelena Gulicheva	Yabloko	6,290	9.56%
Vadim Artamonov	Liberal Democratic Party	2,916	4.43%
against all		9,175	13.94%
Total		66,490	100%

=== 2014 ===
Summary of the 14 September 2014 Moscow City Duma election in District 19
Candidate	Party	Votes	%
Viktor Kruglyakov	United Russia	16,855	51.30%
Yury Lapin	Communist Party	6,073	18.48%
Vera Karaseva	Yabloko	4,305	13.10%
Maksim Mayorov	A Just Russia	2,567	7.81%
Mikhail Novikov	Liberal Democratic Party	1,842	5.61%
Total		32,857	100%

=== 2019 ===
Summary of the 8 September 2019 Moscow City Duma election in District 19
Candidate	Party	Votes	%
Oleg Sheremetyev	Communist Party	12,172	40.23%
Irina Nazarova	Independent	11,558	38.20%
Kirill Volkov	Liberal Democratic Party	2,955	9.77%
Roman Ilyin	Communists of Russia	2,224	7.53%
Total		30,258	100%

=== 2021 ===
Summary of the 17-19 September 2021 by-election to the Moscow City Duma in District 19
Candidate	Party	Votes	%
Yelena Kats	United Russia	24,407	33.95%
Pyotr Karmanov	Independent	14,662	20.40%
Maksim Lapshin	Communist Party	6,900	9.60%
Georgy Fedorov	A Just Russia — For Truth	5,595	7.78%
Andrey Lapin	Party of Pensioners	4,144	5.76%
Nikolay Sheremetyev	Communists of Russia	3,696	5.14%
Mikhail Butrimov	Independent	2,589	3.60%
Mikhail Monakhov	Liberal Democratic Party	2,571	3.58%
Ilya Ostrovsky	New People	2,273	3.16%
Vadim Aleksandrov	Green Alternative	1,455	2.02%
Sergey Medvedev	Independent	1,229	1.71%
Vladislav Romashko	Independent	287	0.40%
Mikhail Ochkin	Independent	285	0.40%
Total		71,885	100%

=== 2024 ===
Summary of the 6–8 September 2024 Moscow City Duma election in District 19
Candidate	Party	Votes	%
Maya Bulayeva	United Russia	31,037	38.99%
Dmitry Bolshakov	Liberal Democratic Party	10,582	13.29%
Dmitry Zakharov	New People	7,334	9.21%
Aleksandr Andreyev	Communist Party	6,609	8.30%
Konstantin Krokhmal	A Just Russia – For Truth	4,248	5.34%
Aleksandr Stupin	Independent	3,771	4.74%
Anton Alekseyev	Independent	3,190	4.01%
Anton Shuvalov	The Greens	2,828	3.55%
Total		79,612	100%
