= Moscow City Duma District 18 =

Moscow City Duma electoral constituency

- Moscow City Duma constituency
- Deputy: Lyudmila Mitryuk; United Russia
- Administrative Okrug: Eastern
- Districts: Novokosino, part of Novogireyevo, part of Veshnyaki, Vostochny
- Voters: 155,761 (2024)

Moscow City Duma District 18 is one of 45 constituencies in Moscow City Duma. Currently the district covers outer parts of Eastern Moscow.

The district has been represented since 2024 by United Russia deputy Lyudmila Mitryuk, a former Moscow City Government official and elderly care centre director, who succeeded retiring one-term United Russia incumbent and doctor Yelena Kats from District 19.

== Boundaries ==
District boundaries from 2014 to 2024

1993–1997: Kuzminki, Nekrasovka, Ryazansky, Vykhino-Zhulebino
The district covered outer parts of Eastern Moscow.

1997–2005: Kuzminki, Nekrasovka, Vykhino-Zhulebino
The district continued to cover outer parts of Eastern Moscow but lost Ryazansky District to District 17.

2005–2014: constituency abolished
Prior to the 2005 election the number of constituencies was reduced to 15, so the district was eliminated.

2014–2024: part of Izmaylovo, part of Severnoye Izmaylovo, Vostochnoye Izmaylovo, Vostochny
The district was created prior to the 2014 election, after Moscow City Duma had been expanded from 35 to 45 seats. It is covers parts of Eastern Moscow, including the exclave of Vostochny.

2024–present: Novokosino, part of Novogireyevo, part of Veshnyaki, Vostochny
During the 2023–24 Moscow redistricting most of the district was divided between districts 15 (Severnoye Izmaylovo) and 17 (Izmaylovo, Vostochnoye Izmaylovo). In its new configuration retained only Vostochny and took territories far south from the exclave from districts 19 (part of Novogireyevo, part of Veshnyaki) and 20 (Novokosino).

== Members elected ==
| Election | Member | Party |
|---|---|---|
| 1993 | Viktor Kudin (Note: resigned in October 1994) | Independent |
| 1995 | Mikhail Ilyin | Independent |
| 1997 | Gennady Lobok | Independent |
| 2001 | Gennady Lobok | Independent |
| 2005 | Constituency eliminated | |
| 2009 | Constituency eliminated | |
| 2014 | Irina Nazarova | Independent |
| 2019 | Yelena Yanchuk | Communist Party |
| 2024 | Lyudmila Mitryuk | United Russia |

== Election results ==
=== 2001 ===
Summary of the 16 December 2001 Moscow City Duma election in District 18
| Candidate | Party | Votes | % |
|---|---|---|---|
| Gennady Lobok | Independent | 28,133 | 46.13% |
| Vladimir Kostyuchenko | Independent | 15,553 | 25.50% |
| Mikhail Ilyin | Independent | 5,987 | 9.82% |
| against all | | 8,501 | 13.94% |
| Total | | 61,484 | 100% |

=== 2014 ===
Summary of the 14 September 2014 Moscow City Duma election in District 18
| Candidate | Party | Votes | % |
|---|---|---|---|
| Irina Nazarova | Independent | 13,921 | 40.85% |
| Margarita Chukanova | Communist Party | 10,182 | 29.88% |
| Semyon Burd | Yabloko | 3,416 | 10.02% |
| Andrey Kireyev | Liberal Democratic Party | 2,117 | 6.21% |
| Vladimir Pogorelov | Independent | 1,489 | 4.37% |
| Galina Babykina | Independent | 1,282 | 3.76% |
| Aigul Makhmutova | A Just Russia | 654 | 1.92% |
| Total | | 34,077 | 100% |

=== 2019 ===
Summary of the 8 September 2019 Moscow City Duma election in District 18
| Candidate | Party | Votes | % |
|---|---|---|---|
| Yelena Yanchuk | Communist Party | 15,246 | 42.16% |
| Nikolay Tabashnikov | Independent | 8,386 | 23.19% |
| Anton Medvedev | Liberal Democratic Party | 4,629 | 12.80% |
| Marya Marusenko | Independent | 4,516 | 12.49% |
| Darya Shestakova | A Just Russia | 1,912 | 5.29% |
| Total | | 36,165 | 100% |

=== 2024 ===
Summary of the 6–8 September 2024 Moscow City Duma election in District 18
| Candidate | Party | Votes | % |
|---|---|---|---|
| Lyudmila Mitryuk | United Russia | 33,577 | 50.24% |
| Aleksey Antipov | Communist Party | 7,176 | 10.74% |
| Aleksandr Molokhov | A Just Russia – For Truth | 6,778 | 10.14% |
| Aleksandr Moskvitin | Liberal Democratic Party | 6,399 | 9.57% |
| Vladislav Voynakov | New People | 5,931 | 8.87% |
| Vadim Aleksandrov | Independent | 3,750 | 5.61% |
| Vladimir Badmayev | Independent | 3,195 | 4.78% |
| Total | | 66,839 | 100% |
