= Moscow City Duma District 17 =

Moscow City Duma electoral constituency

- Moscow City Duma constituency
- Deputy: Vyacheslav Arbuzov; Communist Party
- Administrative Okrug: Eastern
- Districts: Ivanovskoye, Izmaylovo, Vostochnoye Izmaylovo
- Voters: 173,911 (2024)

Moscow City Duma District 17 is one of 45 constituencies in Moscow City Duma. Currently the district covers outer parts of Eastern Moscow.

The district has been represented since 2024 by Communist Vyacheslav Arbuzov, a former Ivanovo Oblast Duma Deputy Chairman, who succeeded one-term Communist incumbent Yelena Yanchuk from District 18 after Yanchuk was deselected at the party convention.

== Boundaries ==
District boundaries from 2014 to 2024

1993–1997: Lefortovo, Nizhegorodsky, Tekstilshchiki, Yuzhnoportovy
The district covered parts of South-Eastern Moscow.

1997–2001: Lefortovo, Nizhegorodsky, Ryazansky, Tekstilshchiki
The district continued to cover parts of South-Eastern Moscow but lost Yuzhnoportovy District to District 3, in exchange gaining Ryazansky District from District 18.

2001–2005: Lefortovo, part of Lyublino, Nizhegorodsky, Ryazansky, Tekstilshchiki
The district continued to cover parts of South-Eastern Moscow, gaining part of Lyublino from District 19.

2005–2009: constituency abolished
Prior to the 2005 election the number of constituencies was reduced to 15, so the district was eliminated.

2009–2014: Kurkino, Mitino, Molzhaninovsky, Pokrovskoye-Streshnevo, Severnoye Tushino, Shchukino, Yuzhnoye Tushino
The district was created prior to the 2009 election, after the number of constituencies was increased from 15 to 17. The district was based primarily in North-Western Moscow as well as Molzhaninovsky District in Northern Moscow, which were previously divided between districts 3 and 15

2014–2024: part of Ivanovskoye, Perovo, part of Sokolinaya Gora, Vostochny
The district was completely rearranged in the 2014 redistricting as it was moved to Eastern Moscow.

2024–present: Ivanovskoye, Izmaylovo, Vostochnoye Izmaylovo
During the 2023–24 Moscow redistricting most of the district was moved into District 16. In its new configuration the district retained only part of Ivanovskoye, uniting it with the rest of the raion from former District 19, while most of the current district came from District 18.

== Members elected ==
Election	Member	Party
1993	Lyudmila Stebenkova	Choice of Russia
1997	Lyudmila Stebenkova	Independent
2001	Lyudmila Stebenkova	Union of Right Forces
2005	Constituency eliminated	
2009	Valery Skobinov	United Russia
2014	Aleksandr Smetanov	United Russia
2019	Viktor Maksmimov	Communist Party
2024	Vyacheslav Arbuzov	Communist Party

== Election results ==
=== 2001 ===
Summary of the 16 December 2001 Moscow City Duma election in District 17
Candidate	Party	Votes	%
Lyudmila Stebenkova (incumbent)	Union of Right Forces	53,699	73.48%
Andrey Lychakov	Anarchists	4,501	6.16%
Nina Kuznetsova	Independent	2,826	3.87%
against all		9,966	13.64%
Total		73,912	100%

=== 2009 ===
Summary of the 11 October 2009 Moscow City Duma election in District 17
Candidate	Party	Votes	%
Valery Skobinov (incumbent) (Note: redistricted from District 15)	United Russia	58,725	54.98%
Galina Khovanskaya	A Just Russia	17,763	16.63%
Yelena Pavlova	Communist Party	15,450	14.47%
Vitaly Zolochevsky	Liberal Democratic Party	3,790	3.55%
Dmitry Yakovlev	Independent	3,732	3.49%
Aleksandr Komissarov	Patriots of Russia	3,442	3.22%
Total		106,805	100%

=== 2014 ===
Summary of the 14 September 2014 Moscow City Duma election in District 17
Candidate	Party	Votes	%
Aleksandr Smetanov	United Russia	18,190	54.58%
Mikhail Petrov	Communist Party	5,703	17.11%
Aleksey Ponomarev	Independent	3,148	9.45%
Nikolay Pinyasov	Yabloko	2,218	6.66%
Andrey Andreyev	Liberal Democratic Party	1,628	4.89%
Igor Brumel	A Just Russia	1,210	3.63%
Total		33,325	100%

=== 2019 ===
Summary of the 8 September 2019 Moscow City Duma election in District 17
Candidate	Party	Votes	%
Viktor Maksimov	Communist Party	13,505	45.87%
Anastasia Tatulova	Independent	8,318	28.25%
Andrey Medvedkov	A Just Russia	3,580	12.16%
Ilya Khovanets	Liberal Democratic Party	2,645	8.98%
Total		29,441	100%

=== 2024 ===
Summary of the 6–8 September 2024 Moscow City Duma election in District 17
Candidate	Party	Votes	%
Vyacheslav Arbuzov	Communist Party	22,545	31.58%
Dmitry Kapitoshin	A Just Russia – For Truth	16,510	23.13%
Marina Zaytseva	Liberal Democratic Party	16,297	22.83%
Yekaterina Rubina	New People	15,931	22.32%
Total		71,380	100%
