= Moscow City Duma District 15 =

Moscow City Duma electoral constituency

- Moscow City Duma constituency
- Deputy: Pyotr Potapov; Liberal Democratic Party
- Administrative Okrug: Eastern
- Districts: part of Golyanovo, Preobrazhenskoye, Severnoye Izmaylovo
- Voters: 170,740 (2024)

Moscow City Duma District 15 is one of 45 constituencies in Moscow City Duma. Currently the district covers parts of Eastern Moscow.

The district has been represented since 2024 by Liberal Democratic Party (Note: elected as an independent) deputy Pyotr Potapov, a Moscow Railway deputy chief, who succeeded one-term Communist Party incumbent Sergey Sevastyanov after Sevastyanov was deselected at the party convention.

== Boundaries ==
District boundaries from 2014 to 2024

1993–2001: Ivanovskoye, Perovo
The district covered parts of Eastern Moscow.

2001–2005: Ivanovskoye, part of Novogireyevo, part of Perovo
The district continued to cover parts of Eastern Moscow but lost part of Perovo to District 14, in exchange gaining Novogireyevo from District 16.

2005–2009: Khoroshyovo-Mnyovniki, Kurkino, Mitino, Pokrovskoye-Streshnevo, Severnoye Tushino, Strogino, Severnoye Tushino
The district was completely reconfigured as it was placed into mostly North-Western Moscow, overlapping the then-eliminated State Duma Tushino constituency.

2009–2014: Fili-Davydkovo, Mozhaysky, Novo-Peredelkino, Ochakovo-Matveyevskoye, Solntsevo, Troparyovo-Nikulino Vnukovo
The district was rearranged prior to the 2009 election, after the number of constituencies was increased from 15 to 17. The district was based in Western Moscow, which were previously divided between districts 13 and 14.

2014–2024: Golyanovo, Metrogorodok, part of Severnoye Izmaylovo
The district was completely rearranged in the 2014 redistricting as it was moved to cover outer parts of Eastern Moscow.

2024–present: part of Golyanovo, Preobrazhenskoye, Severnoye Izmaylovo
During the 2023–24 Moscow redistricting most of the district retained only parts of Golyanovo and Severnoye Izmaylovo, while the rest of Golyanovo and Metrogorodok were redistricted into District 14. In its new configuration the district gained the rest of Severnoye Izmaylovo from District 18 and Preobrazhenskoye from District 16.

== Members elected ==
Election	Member	Party
1993	Aleksandr Makarov	Independent
1997	Oleg Muzyrya	Independent
2001	Vera Stepanenko	Yabloko
2005	Valery Skobinov	United Russia
2009	Aleksandr Milyavsky	United Russia
2014	Andrey Metelsky	United Russia
2019	Sergey Sevostyanov	Communist Party
2024	Pyotr Potapov	Independent

== Election results ==
=== 2001 ===
Summary of the 16 December 2001 Moscow City Duma election in District 15
Candidate	Party	Votes	%
Vera Stepanenko	Yabloko	13,540	28.25%
Aleksey Chesnokov	Independent	10,069	21.01%
Aleksandr Bulgakov	Independent	6,502	13.57%
Igor Antonov	Independent	5,583	11.65%
Konstantin Glodev	Independent	2,816	5.88%
against all		7,147	14.91%
Total		48,533	100%

=== 2005 ===
Summary of the 4 December 2005 Moscow City Duma election in District 15
Candidate	Party	Votes	%
Valery Skobinov (incumbent) (Note: redistricted from District 34)	United Russia	76,985	51.07%
Aleksandr Krutov	Communist Party	21,811	14.47%
Andrey Bocharnikov	Rodina	19,957	13.24%
Andrey Sotnikov	Liberal Democratic Party	7,733	5.13%
Anatoly Babanov	Independent	6,948	4.61%
Viktor Vdovkin	Russian Party of Life	6,357	4.22%
Valery Kubarev	Independent	3,015	2.00%
Total		150,757	100%

=== 2009 ===
Summary of the 11 October 2009 Moscow City Duma election in District 15
Candidate	Party	Votes	%
Aleksandr Milyavsky	United Russia	99,901	71.08%
Yury Novikov	Communist Party	23,277	16.56%
Vladimir Borshchev	Liberal Democratic Party	11,356	8.08%
Total		140,556	100%

=== 2014 ===
Summary of the 14 September 2014 Moscow City Duma election in District 15
Candidate	Party	Votes	%
Andrey Metelsky (incumbent) (Note: redistricted from District 6)	United Russia	15,423	53.43%
Maksim Timonin	Communist Party	4,064	14.08%
Aleksey Krapukhin	Yabloko	3,467	12.01%
Stanislav Shilov	Independent	1,953	6.77%
Vyacheslav Dushenko	A Just Russia	1,634	5.66%
Mikhail Yuryev	Liberal Democratic Party	1,294	4.48%
Total		28,866	100%

=== 2019 ===
Summary of the 8 September 2019 Moscow City Duma election in District 15
Candidate	Party	Votes	%
Sergey Savostyanov	Communist Party	12,955	42.16%
Andrey Metelsky (incumbent)	Independent	9,790	31.86%
Aleksey Kustov	Liberal Democratic Party	2,811	9.15%
Yury Vostokov	Independent	2,091	6.80%
Ivan Ostrikov	Communists of Russia	1,797	5.85%
Total		30,729	100%

=== 2024 ===
Summary of the 6–8 September 2024 Moscow City Duma election in District 15
Candidate	Party	Votes	%
Pyotr Potapov	Independent	23,322	33.95%
Nikolay Kolosov	New People	12,595	18.33%
Aleksandr Dyagilev	A Just Russia – For Truth	9,991	14.54%
Nikolay Timonin	Communists of Russia	9,628	14.01%
Denis Rudykh	Communist Party	7,831	11.40%
Vladimir Anshakov	Independent	5,274	7.68%
Total		78,606	100%
