= By-elections to the 7th Moscow City Duma =

By-elections to the 7th Moscow City Duma are held to fill vacancies in the Russian regional parliament between the 2019 election and the 2024 election.

According to article 82 of the Moscow Electoral Code, by-elections are appointed by the Moscow Electoral Commission. By-elections are not appointed and are not held if, as a result of these elections, a Deputy cannot be elected for a term of more than one year before the end of the constitutional term for which the Moscow City Duma was elected. The Federal Law establishes the second Sunday of September (single voting day) as the date for any regional election, including by-elections.

The first by-elections were held on 17–19 September 2021, in two constituencies.

Candidates endorsed by Aleksey Navalny's Smart Voting are marked with a (*) in the list below.

== Overview ==
Constituency	Date	Former MP	Party	Cause	Winner	Party	Retained
№37	2021	Nikolay Gubenko	Communist Party	Death	Vladimir Ryzhkov	Yabloko	No
№19	2021	Oleg Sheremetyev	Communist Party	Conviction	Yelena Kats	United Russia	No

== 2021 by-election in Constituency №37 ==
On 16 August 2020 incumbent Deputy and Vice Speaker of the Moscow City Duma Nikolay Gubenko (CPRF) died from heart failure after struggling with illness. Gubenko served in the City Duma since 2005, previously he was a State Duma member (1995-2003) and last Soviet Minister of Culture (1989-1991). In 2019 Nikolay Gubenko was elected in a landslide with 61.65% of the vote with the support from both Aleksey Navalny's Smart Voting and the Government of Moscow.

Moscow City Duma District 37 is located in South-Western Moscow and includes Akademichesky District, Gagarinsky District, Lomonosovsky District and parts of Prospekt Vernadskogo.

=== Registered candidates ===
- Leonid Afanasyev (Communists of Russia), economist at CJSC "Stroyavtomatika"
- Darya Bagina (CPRF), first secretary of LKSM Moscow city committee
- Aleksandr Bely (Independent), mass entertainments director at the Centre of Sport and Education "Sambo-70"
- Maksim Chirkov (SR-ZP), professor of economics at Moscow State University, former Member of Gagarinsky District Assembly of Deputies (2004-2017)
- Yury Dmitriyev (New People), political consultant, former Member of Serpukhov Council of Deputies (2005-2010)
- Roman Khudyakov (Independent), former Member of State Duma (2012-2016)
- Yury Maksimov (LDPR), professor of economics at Moscow State University
- Yekaterina Razzakova (United Russia), community activist, chief accountant at JSC "Il' De Bote"
- Vladimir Ryzhkov (Yabloko), former Member of State Duma (1993-2007)

=== Failed to qualify ===
- Yelena Rusakova (Independent), Head of Gagarinsky District, 2018 mayoral candidate in Yabloko primary
- Grigory Tolkachev (Independent), Member of Gagarinsky District Assembly of Deputies

=== Withdrew ===
- Danil Degtyarev (Independent), individual entrepreneur
- Iosif Dzhagaev (Independent), aide to chairman of Civic Initiative North Ossetia regional office
- Aleksandr Mayshev (Independent), individual entrepreneur
- Aleksandr Meshcheryakov (Independent), homemaker
- Igor Semenovsky (Independent), aide to State Duma member Sergey Ten
- Ilya Yashin (Independent), Head of Krasnoselsky District, 2018 mayoral candidate

=== Results ===
Summary of the 17-19 September 2021 by-election to the Moscow City Duma in the Constituency №37
Candidate	Party	Votes	%
Vladimir Ryzhkov	Yabloko	16,623	21.05%
Darya Bagina*	Communist Party	15,658	19.83%
Yekaterina Razzakova	United Russia	12,822	16.24%
Maksim Chirkov	A Just Russia — For Truth	9,274	11.75%
Yury Maksimov	Liberal Democratic Party	5,553	7.03%
Yury Dmitriyev	New People	5,200	6.59%
Roman Khudyakov	Independent	4,580	5.80%
Aleksandr Bely	Independent	4,561	5.78%
Leonid Afanasyev	Communists of Russia	2,849	3.61%
Total		78,958	100%

== 2021 by-election in Constituency №19 ==
In August 2020 incumbent Deputy Oleg Sheremetyev (CPRF) was arrested on charges of fraud, he allegedly claimed for personal uses money intended for his aide. In October 2020 Shermetyev was found guilty and sentenced for 4 years probation, his status of Moscow City Duma deputy as the result was suspended. Oleg Sheremetyev won in 2019 with 42.11% of the vote, defeating Constituency №18 incumbent Deputy Irina Nazarova (My Moscow) with the support of Smart Voting.

Moscow City Duma District 19 is located in Eastern Moscow and includes Novogireyevo, parts of Ivanovskoye and Veshnyaki.

=== Registered candidates ===
- Vadim Aleksandrov (ZA!), unemployed
- Mikhail Butrimov (Independent), former chairman of Russian All-People's Union regional office (2019-2021)
- Georgy Fedorov (SR-ZP), former Member of Civic Chamber of the Russian Federation (2011-2016)
- Pyotr Karmanov (Independent), aide to Moscow City Duma member Darya Besedina
- Yelena Kats (United Russia), chief doctor of Children's City Polyclinic №7, Member of Veshnyaki Council of Deputies
- Andrey Lapin (RPPSS), professor of public administration at Russian Presidential Academy of National Economy and Public Administration
- Maksim Lapshin (CPRF), foreman of construction and assembly department 1 at LLP "Engineering company MRES"
- Sergey Medvedev (Independent), technician at LLP "Promstart"
- Mikhail Monakhov (LDPR), coordinator of the LDPR Moscow city office, aide to Senator Aleksandr Pronyushkin of Vladimir Oblast
- Mikhail Ochkin (Independent), anticorruption activist, perennial candidate
- Ilya Ostrovsky (New People), aide to chairman of "People Against Corruption" political party
- Vladislav Romashko (Independent), unemployed
- Nikolay Sheremetyev (Communists of Russia), general director of LLP "ListRezerv"

=== Withdrew ===
- Antonina Smirnova (Independent), pensioner

=== Results ===
Summary of the 17-19 September 2021 by-election to the Moscow City Duma in the Constituency №19
Candidate	Party	Votes	%
Yelena Kats	United Russia	24,407	33.95%
Pyotr Karmanov	Independent	14,662	20.40%
Maksim Lapshin*	Communist Party	6,900	9.60%
Georgy Fedorov	A Just Russia — For Truth	5,595	7.78%
Andrey Lapin	Party of Pensioners	4,144	5.76%
Nikolay Sheremetyev	Communists of Russia	3,696	5.14%
Mikhail Butrimov	Independent	2,589	3.60%
Mikhail Monakhov	Liberal Democratic Party	2,571	3.58%
Ilya Ostrovsky	New People	2,273	3.16%
Vadim Aleksandrov	Green Alternative	1,455	2.02%
Sergey Medvedev	Independent	1,229	1.71%
Vladislav Romashko	Independent	287	0.40%
Mikhail Ochkin	Independent	285	0.40%
Total		71,885	100%
