= Moscow City Duma District 14 =

Moscow City Duma electoral constituency

- Moscow City Duma constituency
- Deputy: Sabina Tsvetkova; United Russia
- Administrative Okrug: Eastern
- Districts: Bogorodskoye, part of Golyanovo, Metrogorodok, Sokolniki
- Voters: 162,632 (2024)

Moscow City Duma District 14 is one of 45 constituencies in Moscow City Duma. Currently the district covers parts of Eastern Moscow.

The district has been represented since 2024 by United Russia deputy Sabina Tsvetkova, a community activist, who succeeded retiring one-term A Just Russia – For Truth incumbent and foreign agent Mikhail Timonov, redistricted there from District 16.

== Boundaries ==
District boundaries from 2014 to 2024

1993–1997: Izmaylovo, Sokolinaya Gora, Vostochnoye Izmaylovo
The district covered parts of Eastern Moscow.

1997–2001: Izmaylovo, Sokolinaya Gora, Vostochnoye Izmaylovo, TEOS Izmaylovsky Park
The district was unchanged with Izmaylovo Park being elevated to a separate administrative division status.

2001–2005: part of Izmaylovo, part of Perovo, part of Sokolinaya Gora, Vostochnoye Izmaylovo, TEOS Izmaylovsky Park (Note: merged into Izmaylovo District in 2002)
The district continued to cover parts of Eastern Moscow but lost part of Sokolinaya Gora to District 12 and part of Izmaylovo – to District 13, in exchange gaining part of Perovo from District 15.

2005–2009: Dorogomilovo, Fili-Davydkovo, Filyovsky Park, Krylatskoye, Kuntsevo, Mozhaysky, Ochakovo-Matveyevskoye
The district was completely reconfigured as it was placed into Western Moscow, overlapping the then-eliminated State Duma Kuntsevo constituency.

2009–2014: Akademichesky, Cheryomushki, Dorogomilovo, Gagarinsky, Lomonosovsky, Obruchevsky, Prospekt Vernadskogo, Ramenki
The district was rearranged prior to the 2009 election, after the number of constituencies was increased from 15 to 17. The district retained only Dorogomilovo and was based in Western and South-Western Moscow, which were previously divided between districts 12 and 13.

2014–2024: Alekseyevsky, Butyrsky, Maryina Roshcha, Ostankinsky, Rostokino
The district was completely rearranged in the 2014 redistricting as it was moved to cover inner parts of North-Eastern Moscow.

2024–present: Bogorodskoye, part of Golyanovo, Metrogorodok, Sokolniki
During the 2023–24 Moscow redistricting the former district was renumbered District 13. In its new configuration the district took parts from districts 15 (Golyanovo, Metrogorodok), 16 (Bogorodskoye) and 45 (Sokolniki).

== Members elected ==
Election	Member	Party
1993	Natalia Aleksandrovskaya	Choice of Russia
1997	Irina Osokina	Yabloko
2001	Andrey Metelsky	Independent
2005	Yevgeny Gerasimov	United Russia
2009	Vladimir Platonov	United Russia
2014	Valery Telichenko	United Russia
2019	Maksim Kruglov	Yabloko
2024	Sabina Tsvetkova	United Russia

== Election results ==
=== 2001 ===
Summary of the 16 December 2001 Moscow City Duma election in District 14
Candidate	Party	Votes	%
Andrey Metelsky	Independent	24,446	45.30%
Irina Osokina (incumbent)	Yabloko	8,609	15.95%
Sergey Karpukhin	Independent	6,952	12.88%
Lyudmila Bogacheva	Independent	4,793	8.88%
Yury Chubar	Liberal Democratic Party	1,181	2.19%
against all		6,453	11.96%
Total		54,821	100%

=== 2005 ===
Summary of the 4 December 2005 Moscow City Duma election in District 14
Candidate	Party	Votes	%
Yevgeny Gerasimov (incumbent) (Note: redistricted from District 31)	United Russia	61,074	39.66%
Pavel Basanets	Communist Party	21,271	13.81%
Aleksandr Tarnavsky (incumbent) (Note: redistricted from District 30)	Independent	17,150	11.14%
Yury Zagrebnoy	Yabloko-United Democrats	14,860	9.65%
Andrey Ivanov	Rodina	14,802	9.61%
Vladislav Volkov	Liberal Democratic Party	5,852	3.80%
Pyotr Tarnavsky	Independent	4,469	2.90%
Andrey Bakhurin	Social Democratic Party	3,573	2.32%
Andrey Kobozev	Independent	2,334	1.52%
Total		153,982	100%

=== 2009 ===
Summary of the 11 October 2009 Moscow City Duma election in District 14
Candidate	Party	Votes	%
Vladimir Platonov (incumbent) (Note: redistricted from District 13)	United Russia	55,214	48.84%
Nikolay Gubenko	Communist Party	36,245	32.06%
Maksim Chirkov	A Just Russia	11,262	9.96%
Aleksey Folvarkov	Liberal Democratic Party	5,156	4.56%
Total		113,040	100%

=== 2014 ===
Summary of the 14 September 2014 Moscow City Duma election in District 14
Candidate	Party	Votes	%
Valery Telichenko	United Russia	15,498	43.27%
Yulia Mikhaylova	Communist Party	9,034	25.22%
Maksim Kruglov	Yabloko	5,731	16.00%
Aleksey Kryukov	Liberal Democratic Party	2,351	6.56%
Dmitry Zakharov	A Just Russia	2,035	5.68%
Total		35,819	100%

=== 2019 ===
Summary of the 8 September 2019 Moscow City Duma election in District 14
Candidate	Party	Votes	%
Maksim Kruglov	Yabloko	15,430	39.32%
Natalya Pochinok	Independent	8,939	22.78%
Georgy Fedorov	A Just Russia	5,134	13.08%
Aleksandr Shkolnikov	Independent	3,373	8.60%
Yevgeny Stepkin	Liberal Democratic Party	2,328	5.93%
Dmitry Klochkov	Independent	2,036	5.19%
Total		39,240	100%

=== 2024 ===
Summary of the 6–8 September 2024 Moscow City Duma election in District 14
Candidate	Party	Votes	%
Sabina Tsvetkova	United Russia	29,508	44.32%
Aleksandr Kotov	Liberal Democratic Party	11,983	18.00%
Aleksey Sokolov	Communist Party	7,731	11.61%
Nikita Surovezhko	New People	5,477	8.23%
Irina Krokhmal	A Just Russia – For Truth	4,010	6.02%
Sergey Smirnov	Independent	3,889	5.84%
Konstantin Presnyakov	The Greens	3,710	5.57%
Total		66,574	100%
