= Moscow City Duma District 33 =

Moscow City Duma electoral constituency

- Moscow City Duma constituency
- Deputy: Natalia Metlina; United Russia
- Administrative Okrug: South-Western
- Districts: Konkovo, Tyoply Stan
- Voters: 171,714 (2024)

Moscow City Duma District 33 is one of 45 constituencies in Moscow City Duma. Currently the constituency covers outer parts of South-Western Moscow.

The district has been represented since 2024 by United Russia deputy Natalia Metlina, (Note: member of My Moscow faction in 2019–2024) a one-term member and TV host, who was redistricted from District 35.

== Boundaries ==
District boundaries from 2014 to 2024

1993–1997: Khoroshyovo-Mnyovniki, Shchukino, Strogino
The district southern parts of North-Western Moscow.

1997–2005: Khoroshyovo-Mnyovniki, Strogino
The district continued to cover southern parts of North-Western Moscow but ceded Shchukino to District 7.

2005–2014: constituency abolished
Prior to the 2005 election the number of constituencies was reduced to 15, so the district was eliminated.

2014–2024: parts of Severnoye Butovo, Yuzhnoye Butovo
The district was created prior to the 2014 election, after Moscow City Duma had been expanded from 35 to 45 seats. It covers most of Butovo in South-Western Moscow.

2024–present: Konkovo, Tyoply Stan
During the 2023–24 Moscow redistricting the territory of the old district was split between districts 31 and 32. In its new configuration the district is the renumbered former District 35.

== Members elected ==
Election	Member	Party
1993	Vladimir Katushenok	Choice of Russia
1997	Vladimir Katushenok	Independent
2001	Aleksandr Kovalyov	Independent
2005	Constituency eliminated	
2009	Constituency eliminated	
2014	Lyudmila Guseva	United Russia
2019	Lyudmila Guseva	Independent
2024	Natalia Metlina	United Russia

== Election results ==
=== 2001 ===
Summary of the 16 December 2001 Moscow City Duma election in District 33
Candidate	Party	Votes	%
Aleksandr Kovalyov	Independent	15,151	28.69%
Tamara Shorina	Independent	12,893	24.42%
Aleksandr Krutov	Communist Party	9,822	18.60%
Yury Zelikovich	Independent	4,584	8.68%
Sergey Maksimov	Independent	1,108	2.10%
against all		7,295	13.81%
Total		53,277	100%

=== 2014 ===
Summary of the 14 September 2014 Moscow City Duma election in District 33
Candidate	Party	Votes	%
Lyudmila Guseva	United Russia	18,979	55.82%
Anton Tarasov	Communist Party	6,155	18.10%
Aleksandr Popov	Yabloko	3,143	9.24%
Platon Grekov	Liberal Democratic Party	2,403	7.07%
Vyacheslav Makarov	A Just Russia	2,199	6.47%
Total		33,998	100%

=== 2019 ===
Summary of the 8 September 2019 Moscow City Duma election in District 33
Candidate	Party	Votes	%
Lyudmila Guseva (incumbent)	Independent	14,401	40.83%
Levon Smirnov	Communist Party	11,284	32.00%
Vladimir Grinchenko	Liberal Democratic Party	3,127	8.87%
Pavel Fedorov	Communists of Russia	2,731	7.74%
Viktor Prisnyak	Rodina	1,451	4.11%
Garegin Papyan	A Just Russia	1,132	3.21%
Total		35,267	100%

=== 2024 ===
Summary of the 6–8 September 2024 Moscow City Duma election in District 33
Candidate	Party	Votes	%
Natalia Metlina (incumbent) (Note: redistricted from District 35)	United Russia	32,113	48.02%
Nikolay Volkov	Communist Party	11,353	16.98%
Yury Soldatov	New People	9,406	14.06%
Maksim Volkov	Liberal Democratic Party	7,879	11.78%
Viktor Nikitin	A Just Russia – For Truth	3,695	5.53%
Denis Azarko	Communists of Russia	2,348	3.51%
Total		66,876	100%
