= 2001 Moscow City Duma election =

- 16 December 2001

All 35 seats in the Moscow City Duma 18 seats needed for a majority
- Turnout: 30.47%
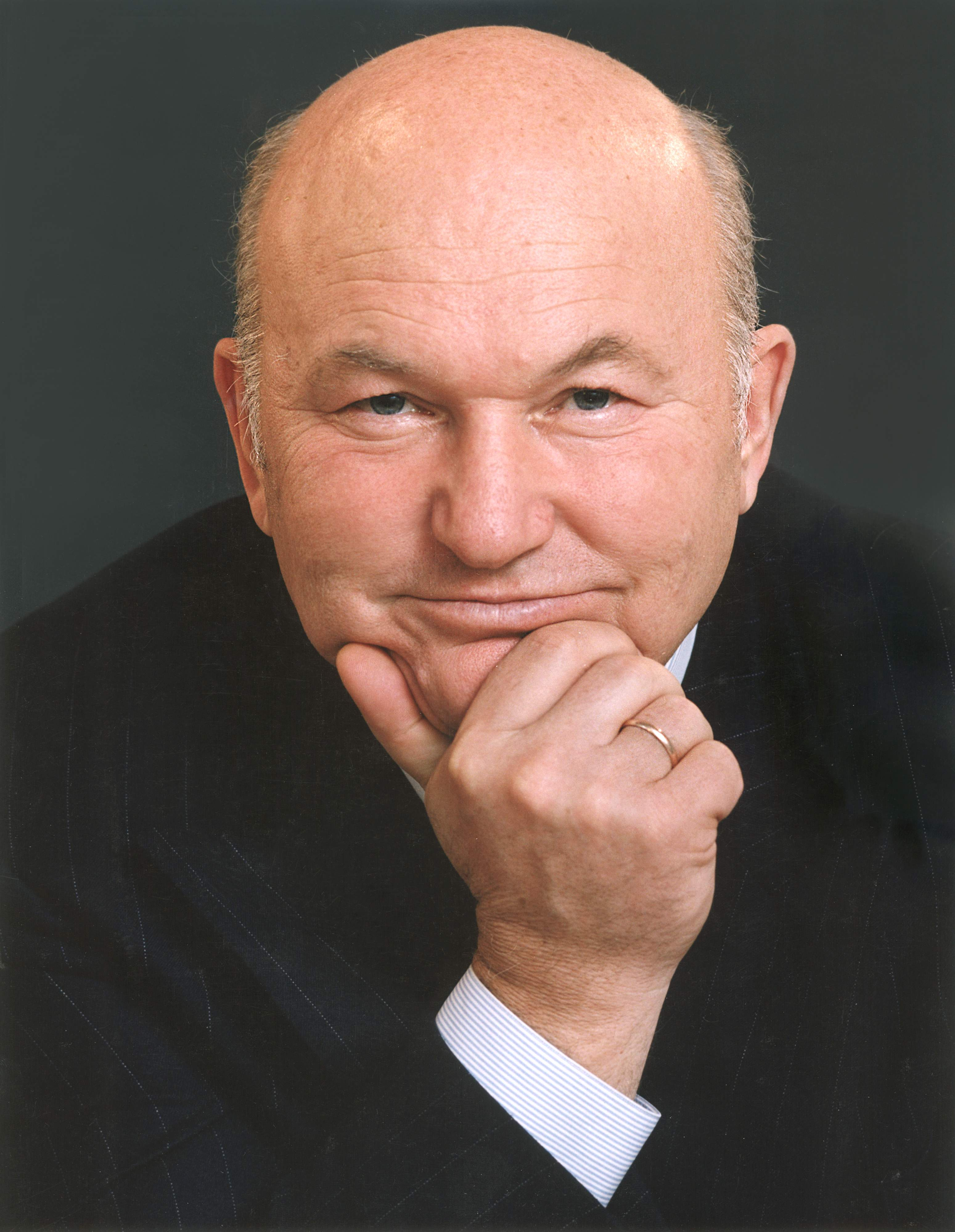
Leader	Yury Luzhkov
Alliance	List of Four (Unity–OVR–Yabloko–SPS)
Seats won	33
Swing	▲7
- Independent (List of Four) SPS Yabloko Independent Re-elected Retired Defeated List of Four Independent
Chairman before election
Vladimir Platonov
Independent
Elected Chairman
Vladimir Platonov
SPS

The Moscow legislative election of 2001 was held on 16 December of that year to the fourth convocation of the Moscow City Duma. The elections were held according to a majoritarian system in 35 single-mandate constituencies.

Every sixth candidate was registered on the basis of an electoral deposit (the amount of which is 450 thousand rubles). There was a noticeable increase in the role of administrative resources compared to previous elections and the understanding by potential candidates that “the fight is useless - everything has been decided in advance”. 25 incumbent deputies took part in the elections, 22 of them were re-elected for a new term. The city election commission spent 121 million rubles on the elections.

== Background ==
Journalist Sergei Dorenko announced his desire to run for deputy, but he refused to participate a month before the elections, citing the fact that he had been sentenced for hooliganism. He was going to create and lead the coalition “In Defense of Putin - Luzhkov”.

On November 5, 2001, the leaders of the emerging ruling party United Russia, as well as the leadership of the Union of Right Forces and Yabloko - Shoigu, Luzhkov, Nemtsov, and Yavlinsky - signed a joint appeal in which they declared their desire to present a single list of candidates for deputies of the city council. According to Moscow Mayor Luzhkov, “essentially, this is the first experience in the history of new Russia of consolidating various political parties on the eve of elections”. Of the 35 districts, 33 were won by candidates who were on this “list of four”.

== Results ==
Independent
Yabloko
Union of Right Forces
Communist Party
Communist Workers Party
Anarchists

District	Winner	Result	Runner-up	Result	Against all
1st	Sergey Goncharov (inc.)	48.63%	Natalia Borodina	22.61%	11.66%
2nd	Mikhail Moskvin-Tarkhanov (inc.)	27.39%	Yelena Karpukhina	23.75%	14.06%
3rd	Inna Svyatenko	30.13%	Aleksandr Shabalov	24.77%	14.41%
4th	Igor Antonov (inc.)	58.95%	Yelena Guseva	11.85%	12.33%
5th	Sergey Osadchy (inc.)	63.07%	Pyotr Zvyagintsev	12.74%	11.39%
6th	Irina Rukina (inc.)	33.67%	Aleksandr Andreyev	23.06%	10.98%
7th	Galina Khovanskaya (inc.)	49.10%	Sergey Nikitin	25.20%	11.67%
8th	Vladimir Vasilyev (inc.)	60.67%	Svetlana Kukushkina	14.57%	13.23%
9th	Tatyana Portnova	38.93%	Sergey Medvedev	20.99%	11.04%
10th	Ivan Novitsky (inc.)	44.44%	Valery Shaposhnikov	22.91%	10.17%
11th	Aleksandr Krutov (inc.)	37.52%	Andrey Babushkin	26.87%	15.12%
12th	Valentina Prisyazhnyuk (inc.)	54.96%	Andrey Kassirov	18.67%	11.22%
13th	Vitaly Kovalevsky (inc.)	29.45%	Pyotr Pokrevsky	18.78%	13.53%
14th	Andrey Metelsky	45.30%	Irina Osokina (inc.)	15.95%	11.96%
15th	Vera Stepanenko	28.25%	Aleksey Chesnokov	21.01%	14.91%
16th	Sergey Loktionov (inc.)	49.22%	Yury Nazarov	18.42%	10.85%
17th	Lyudmila Stebenkova (inc.)	73.48%	Andrey Lychakov	6.16%	13.64%
18th	Gennady Lobok (inc.)	46.13%	Vladimir Kostyuchenko	25.50%	13.94%
19th	Sergey Turta	55.90%	Yelizaveta Makarova	12.34%	13.94%
20th	Mikhail Antontsev	44.74%	Mark Vasilyev	13.82%	17.36%
21st	Stepan Orlov (inc.)	53.14%	Mikhail Virin	10.50%	11.57%
22nd	Yevgeny Balashov (inc.)	58.94%	Vladimir Gavrilov	19.13%	16.63%
23rd	Yury Popov	32.27%	Oleg Sotnikov	17.51%	11.33%
24th	Oleg Bocharov (inc.)	80.24%	Aleksandr Strizhanov	8.49%	9.45%
25th	Dmitry Katayev (inc.)	30.43%	Andrey Shcherbina	19.80%	11.91%
26th	Mikhail Vyshegorodtsev (inc.)	58.37%	Ruslan Khrustalev	15.26%	10.40%
27th	Vladimir Gruzdev	53.17%	Andrey Shirokov (inc.)	16.53%	11.67%
28th	Viktor Volkov	20.55%	Mikhail Gromov	19.45%	16.88%
29th	Vladimir Platonov (inc.)	59.53%	Viktor Anpilov	20.22%	14.71%
30th	Aleksandr Tarnavsky	41.52%	Leonid Olshansky	20.45%	15.46%
31st	Yevgeny Gerasimov	24.01%	Olga Sergeyeva	13.74%	14.84%
32nd	Yevgeny Bunimovich (inc.)	33.47%	Aleksandr Muzyka	19.21%	15.16%
33rd	Aleksandr Kovalyov	28.69%	Tamara Shorina	24.42%	13.81%
34th	Valery Skobinov	32.88%	Aleksandr Volodin	13.75%	11.54%
35th	Zinaida Dragunkina (inc.)	37.63%	Fyodor Zheleznov	26.94%	17.24%

== Aftermath ==
Vladimir Zhirinovsky, leader of the LDPR, said that the elections were rigged, and the real turnout was 14%. At the same time, Deputy Speaker of the Moscow Parliament Alexander Krutov took the initiative to abolish the minimum turnout threshold of 25%, but expressed his disagreement with Zhirinovsky's opinion and pointed out that talk about low turnout "is a great myth, since 30% is a normal phenomenon".

During the term of office of the Moscow City Duma of the third convocation, there were factions “United Russia”, communist, “Rodina” and two democratic ones - “Yabloko - United Democrats” from representatives of “Yabloko” and “Union of Right Forces” and “New Moscow” from representatives “Union of Right Forces”, Russian Party of Life and former independent deputies.
