= Right Bloc (Russia) =

Third Alternative. Right Bloc Третья альтернатива. Правый блок
- Abbreviation: PB (English); ПБ (Russian)
- Leader: Vladimir Burmistrov, Dmitriy Golikov
- Presidium: Congress of Coordinators
- Founded: February 2018; 8 years ago (Right Bloc); 15 July 2019; 7 years ago (Third Alternative)
- Preceded by: Party of Nationalists
- Headquarters: 15th building, Pyatnitskaya Street, Moscow, Russia
- Ideology: Russian nationalism National democracy New Right; Anti-Sovietism; Anti-communism
- Political position: Right-wing to far-right
- National affiliation: Russian March
- Colours: Black; Gold; White
- Slogan: "We define the future!" (Russian: "Будущее определяем мы!")
- Seats in the State Duma: 0 / 450

Party flag

Website
- Right Bloc group

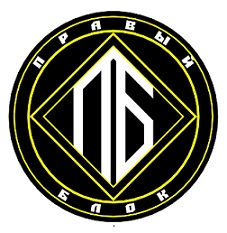
Old logo of the Right Bloc

The Third Alternative. Right Bloc (PB; Russian: Третья альтернатива. Правый блок; ПБ; Tretya alternativa. Pravyy blok, PB) — is an all-Russian democratic movement uniting people of right-wing and nationalist convictions, based on the ideas of national democracy. It was formed in February 2018.

On July 15, 2019, on the basis of the Right Bloc movement, the formation of the All-Russian political party "Third Alternative" began.

== Creation, structure ==
The reason for the emergence was repression against the right-wing organizations or their collapse, with the aim of uniting disparate organizations into a single movement, for the participation of the right-wing in legal politics.

The first coordinators of the movement were Vladimir Burmistrov (ex-head of the Moscow League of the KNS), as well as Dmitry Golikov, Konstantin Filin and Ilya Sotnikov who left the ceased to exist Party of Nationalists.

== Right Bloc Actions ==
The Right Bloc holds and takes part in a variety of meetings, pickets, processions.

The first action of the Right Bloc was participation in the annual march in memory of the famous politician Boris Nemtsov, who was killed in 2015, which took place on February 25, 2018. The movement formed its column on the march, under banners with the slogans "Right Bloc against political repression" and "Russian march against political terror." The movement also built its own, united column of right-wing and nationalists at the March in memory of Nemtsov both in 2019 and in 2020.

The Right Bloc announced a boycott of the presidential elections on March 18, 2018.

The Right Bloc, many of whose coordinators in the past were organizers of the Russian March, in 2018 and 2019 tried to hold the same event in a new format and under the new name "Right March", but faced opposition from the authorities.

On May 1, 2018, the Russian First May campaign was held in Tver. It was held by the Right Bloc's associates together with the local movement "On Guard of Russia" in the Hyde Park on the Glory Square. The rally was originally planned in Moscow, but the authorities refused to approve them/, and the rally was moved to Tver (although there were some obstacles from the local security forces).

The Right Bloc acted as co-organizers of the rally "For a free Russia without repression and arbitrariness!", Which took place on June 10, 2018 in Moscow on Academician Sakharov Avenue, at the initiative of Lev Ponomaryov.

The Right Bloc also took part in the march organized by the libertarians on July 29, 2018, and on August 10, 2018 - in the picket in honor of the anniversary of the failure of the GKChP coup. Also in August 2018, an action was held in support of the defendants in the New Greatness case.

On September 29, 2019, the Right Bloc took part in a large rally against repressions in the "Moscow case".

On March 17, 2020, the Right Bloc, as part of the "single organizing committee", organized a rally "against eternal Putin and his amendments" in Moscow on Suvorov Square.

== Participation in elections ==
In the 2019 Moscow City Duma election, the coordinator of the Right Bloc Vladimir Burmistrov was nominated. Opposition candidates in these elections, incl. and Vladimir, faced opposition from the Government of Moscow and the election commission of Moscow, being refused registration, which subsequently led to protests.

On July 14, 2019, Burmistrov was detained on his way to a protest rally in support of unregistered candidates for the Moscow City Duma in Novopushkinsky square.

On August 5, 2019, the candidate from the right-wing Burmistrov was searched, after which he was detained and arrested for 3 days.

On August 29, 2020, in the building of the election commission of Lytkarino near Moscow, during the signatures, they detained a candidate for municipal deputy Sergei Turushin and the coordinator of the Right Bloc Vladimir Burmistrov. The police held the signature collectors at the place of detention for some time, then released them without presenting charges.

== Harassment of activists ==
On March 24, 2018 in Volokolamsk, activists of the Right Bloc were detained on their way to a rally against emissions of harmful substances from the landfill in Yadrovo.

On September 14, 2018, the coordinator of the Right Bloc Vladimir Burmistrov was summoned for an interview at the Sokolinaya Gora district police department, where he was interviewed by employees of the Centre for Combating Extremism about actions against pension reform in Moscow.

On November 4, 2018, on the Day of People's Unity and the Russian March, the coordinator of the Right Bloc, Vladimir Burmistrov, was detained before the rally; he was taken to his apartment. There he was on vacation, law enforcement officers seized all digital equipment from Burmistrov. It turned out that the coordinator of the "Right Bloc" is a witness in the case initiated under paragraph "b" of Part 1 of Article 213 of the Criminal Code (gross violation of public order expressing disrespect for society, committed on the basis of political, ideological, racial, national or religious hatred or enmity).

On March 29, 2019, at the station in Kostroma, the police detained the coordinator of the Right Bloc, Vladimir Burmistrov, who had arrived at the opening of the local branch of the Right Bloc. In addition, he and other activists staged a series of one-off pickets against the autonomous Internet and for the introduction of a visa regime with the countries of Central Asia. Burmistrov was detained at the station when he was about to leave the city. The station police wanted to inspect his personal belongings, but did not do this, since Burmistrov demanded the presence of attesting witnesses. Soon he was released without charge.

On April 24, 2019, on Tverskoy Boulevard in Moscow, the police detained five nationalists, incl. from the Right Bloc. The reason for the detention is unknown.

On May 19, 2019, the Sverdlovsk District Court of Kostroma arrested Stepan Razin (Svyatyvod), coordinator of the regional branch of the Right Bloc, for 5 days because of pictures on VKontakte.

2On August 8, 2020, the police detained Right Bloc coordinator Vladimir Burmistrov and took him away in an unknown direction. Later it turned out that he was taken to the Internal Affairs Directorate of the Eastern Administrative Okrug and the Moscow City Police, where he was interrogated on a number of Internet videos and registration of the party "Third Alternative".
