= Anna Federmesser =

Russian humanitarian worker

- Анна Федермессер
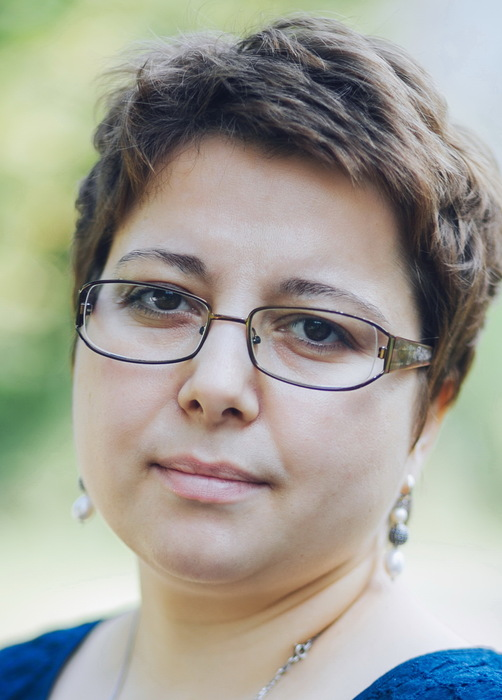
- Federmesser in 2015
- Born: Anna Konstantinovna Federmesser; 11 May 1977 (age 49); Moscow, RSFSR, Soviet Union
- Occupations: Manager in Healthcare and NGO
- Known for: Vera Foundation

Anna Konstantinovna (Nyuta) Federmesser (Russian: А́нна Константи́новна (Нюта) Федерме́ссер; born 11 May 1977) is a Russian humanitarian worker, founder of the Vera Foundation and the Lighthouse Children's Oncology Foundation, activist for the rights of oncology patients. She actively promotes awareness on the necessity of palliative care in Russia, suggesting legitimization of palliative help and establishment of proper education in this field.

== Biography ==
=== Family and early years ===
Nyuta was born in Moscow in a family of doctors. Her father Konstantin Federmesser (1930—2016) was one of the founders of obstetric anesthesiology in the USSR, while her mother Vera Millionshikova (1942—2010) was a pioneer of palliative care and creator of the first Russian hospice. In 1994 Nyuta graduated with honours from Moscow school No.1507, in 1995—1997 she studied English in Cambridge. As early as 17 years of age, Nyuta started as a volunteer in Russian and British hospices.

In 2000 she graduated from the English department of the Moscow State Linguistic University. In 2013 she graduated from the Public Healthcare department of First Moscow State Medical University. At the same time, in 2000—2013 she worked as an English teacher at Moscow school No. 57. Later she tried different occupations, from working in management of the Golden Mask theater festival to personal assistant of the Yukos Vice President and Head of Translation Department at the Chess Academy of Garry Kasparov.

=== 'Vera' Foundation ===
In 2006 Nyuta founded 'Vera' endowment fund, the first of its kind in Russia. The Fund was established to assist hospices and patients, provide palliative care, offer support to families with gravely ill children, raise awareness of oncology, advocate legal changes in order to secure rights of the cancer patients. The Fund motto said 'If a person can't be cured it doesn't mean he can't be helped'. In 2006, Russian Law on Health Protection didn't cover palliative care.

She also co-founded the 'Dom c Mayakom' ('A Lighthouse') in-patient care facility for children with oncology, which was opened in Moscow On October 5, 2019. According to Federmesser, her mother Vera Millionshikova dreamed of creating that place for many years, but the initiative was blocked by bureaucracy for decades.

=== Public activities ===
Anna is an activist in raising awareness on palliative care. She advocated for legislative changes in Russian Law and offered amendments that included hospices and palliative help into basic medical assistance. Federmesser is also an advocate for the rights of oncology patients who have been deprived of painkillers and prescription drugs to alleviate the pain. She also advocates for including education in palliative care into the curriculum of Russian medical universities: as of 2011, no medical school in the country had programs for a profession of a palliative care physician. She also suggests legitimization of volunteer help in hospitals.
