= Veshnyaki District =

- District
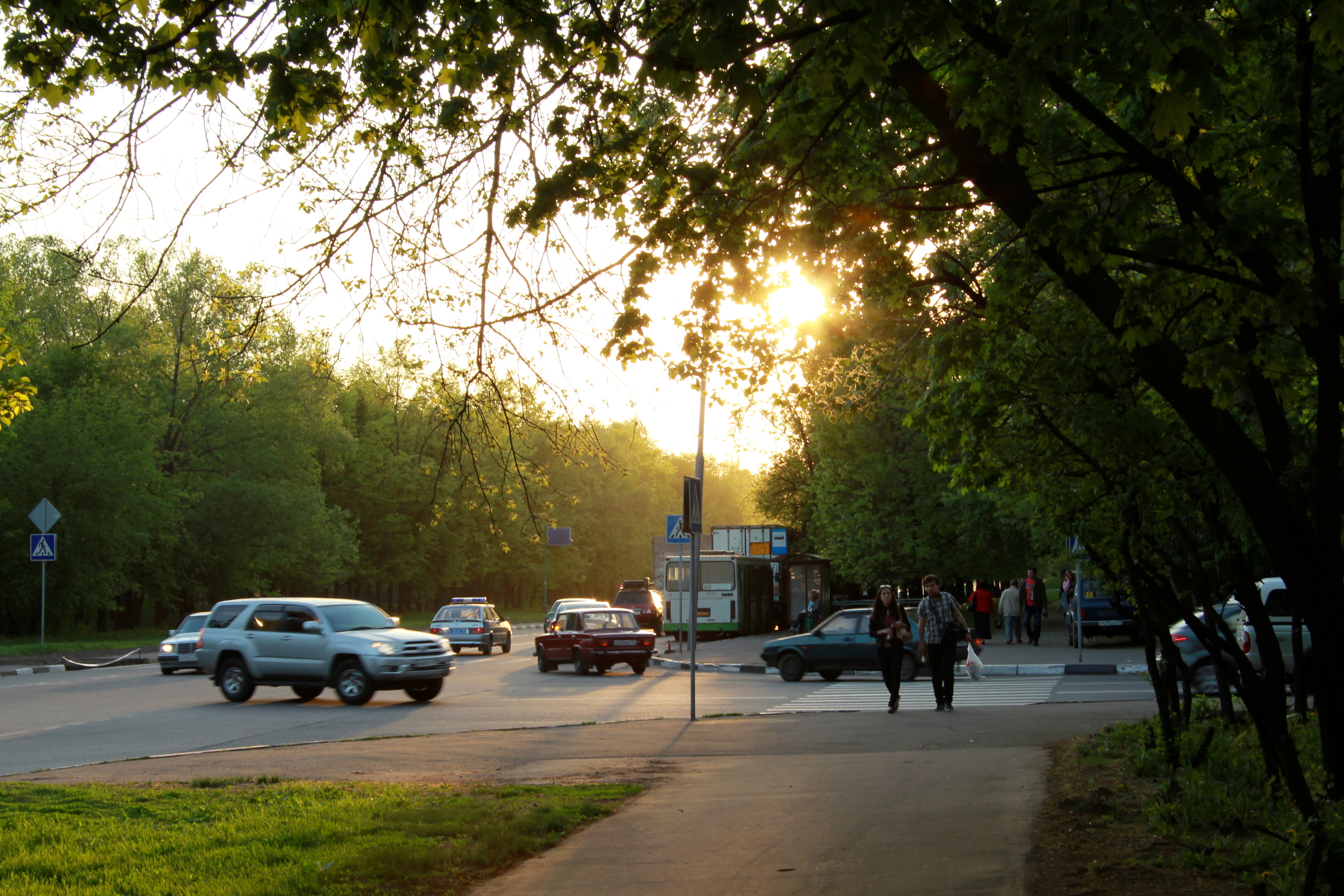
- Krasny Kazanec Street, Veshnyaki District

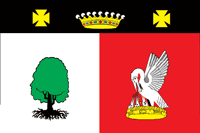
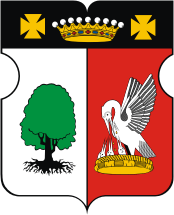
- Flag Coat of arms
- Location of Veshnyaki District on the map of Moscow
- Coordinates: 55°43′05″N 37°48′23″E
- Country: Russia
- Federal subject: Moscow

Area
  - Total: 10.72 km^{2} (4.14 sq mi)
- Time zone: UTC+
- OKTMO ID: 45302000
- Website: http://www.veshnyaki.su/

Veshnyaki District (Russian: Вешняки райо́н) is an administrative district (raion) of Eastern Administrative Okrug, and one of the 125 raions of Moscow, Russia. The area of the district is 10.72 square kilometers (4.14 sq mi).

== See also ==
- Administrative divisions of Moscow
