= Vladimir Platonov (politician) =

Russian politician

- Владимир Платонов
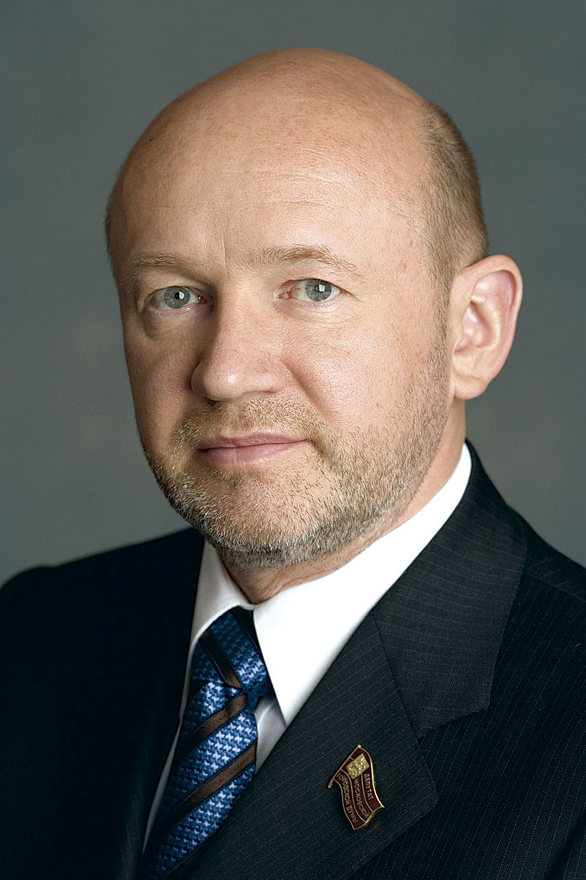

Chairman of the Moscow City Duma
- In office 11 July 1994 – 24 September 2014
- Preceded by: Position created
- Succeeded by: Aleksei Shaposhnikov

Personal details
- Born: December 24, 1954 (age 71) Moscow, RSFSR
- Citizenship: Russia
- Party: United Russia
- Other political affiliations: Democratic Choice of Russia; Union of Right Forces
- Education: Peoples' Friendship University
- Occupation: Politician
- Vladimir Platonov's voice Vladimir Platonov on the Echo of Moscow program, 25 October 2013

Vladimir Mikhailovich Platonov (Russian: Владимир Михайлович Платонов; born 24 December 1954 in Moscow) is a Russian politician who served as chairman of the Moscow City Duma from July 11, 1994, to September 24, 2014. Since May 26, 2016 he is the President of the Moscow Chamber of Commerce and Industry.

== Biography ==
From August 1999 to September 2002 he was a member of the Union of Right Forces party. Left the party due to a long conflict with Boris Nemtsov. He believed that the most suitable candidate for the role of leader of the "right" was Yegor Gaidar.

In April 2015 he received the doctor of law degree. He is holder of the Order "For Merit to the Fatherland" of third degree.
