= Ivanovskoye District =

- District
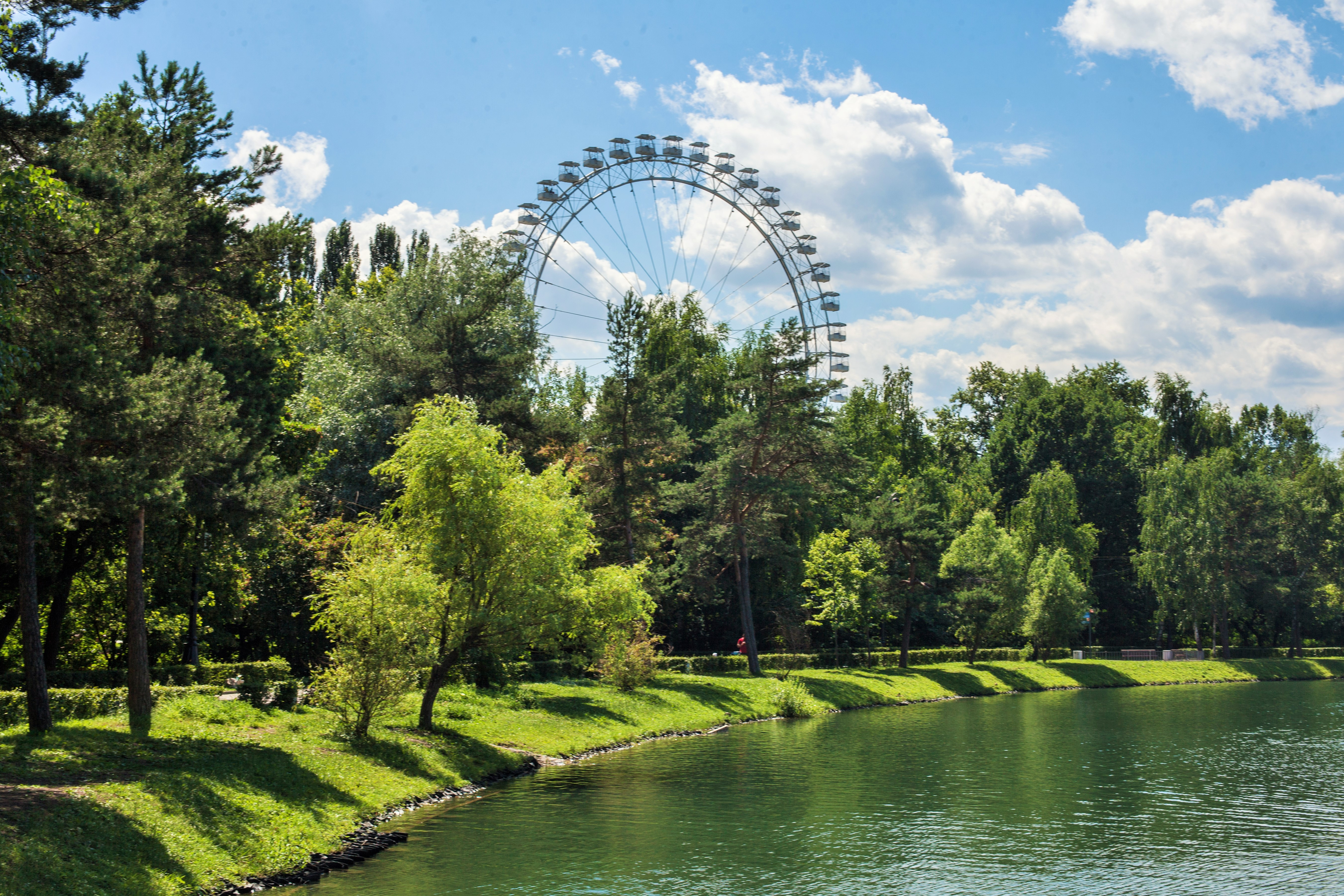
- Izmaylovo Park, Ivanovskoye District

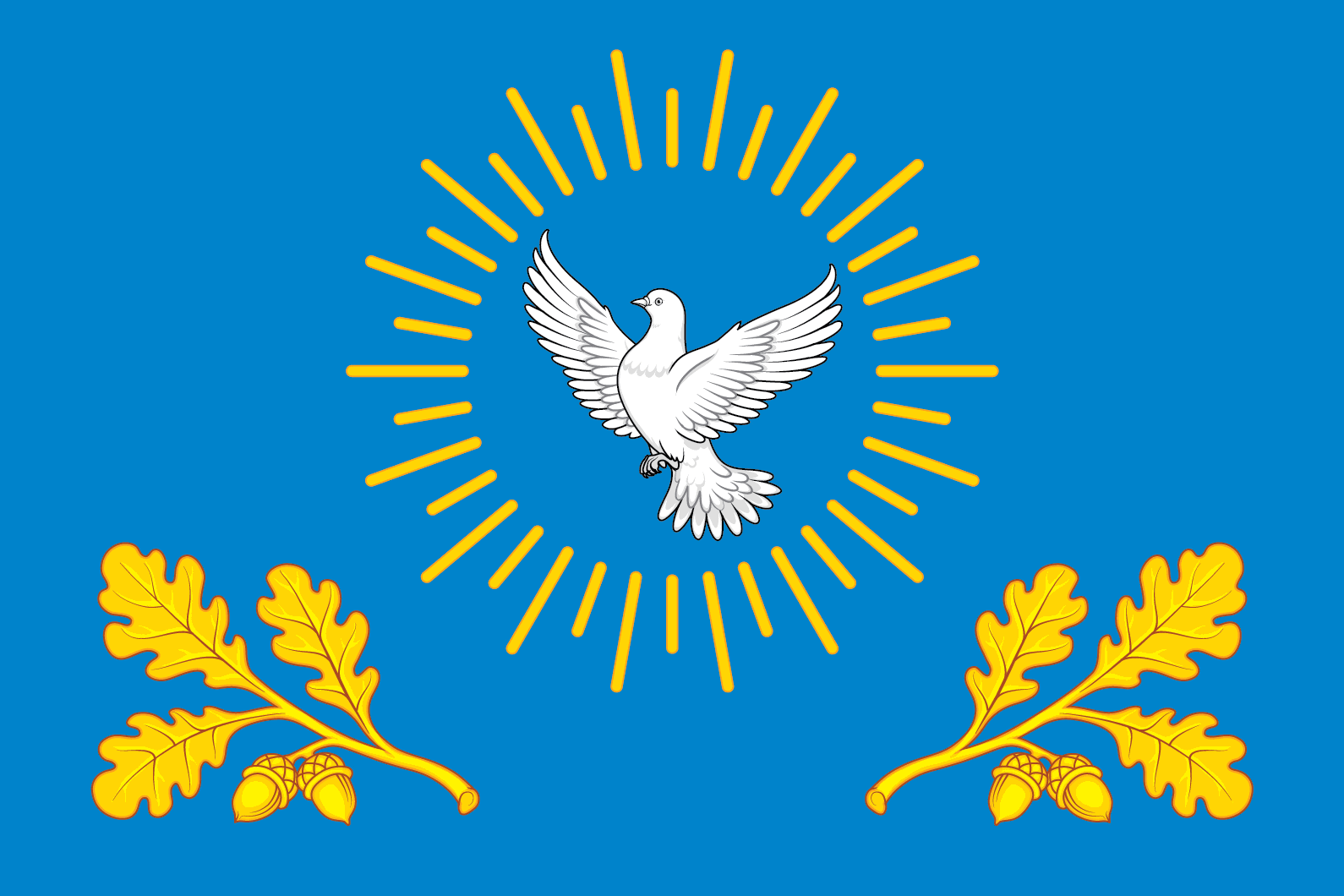
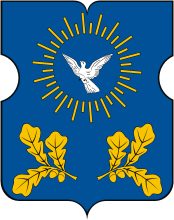
- Flag Coat of arms
- Location of Ivanovskoye District on the map of Moscow
- Coordinates: 55°46′02″N 37°49′58″E
- Country: Russia
- Federal subject: Moscow
- Time zone: UTC+
- OKTMO ID: 45306000
- Website: http://ivanovskoe.mos.ru/

Ivanovskoye District (Russian: райо́н Ива́новское) is an administrative district (raion) of Eastern Administrative Okrug, and one of the 125 raions of Moscow, Russia.

== See also ==
- Administrative divisions of Moscow
