= Novogireyevo District =

Novogireyevo District Новогиреево (Russian)
- District
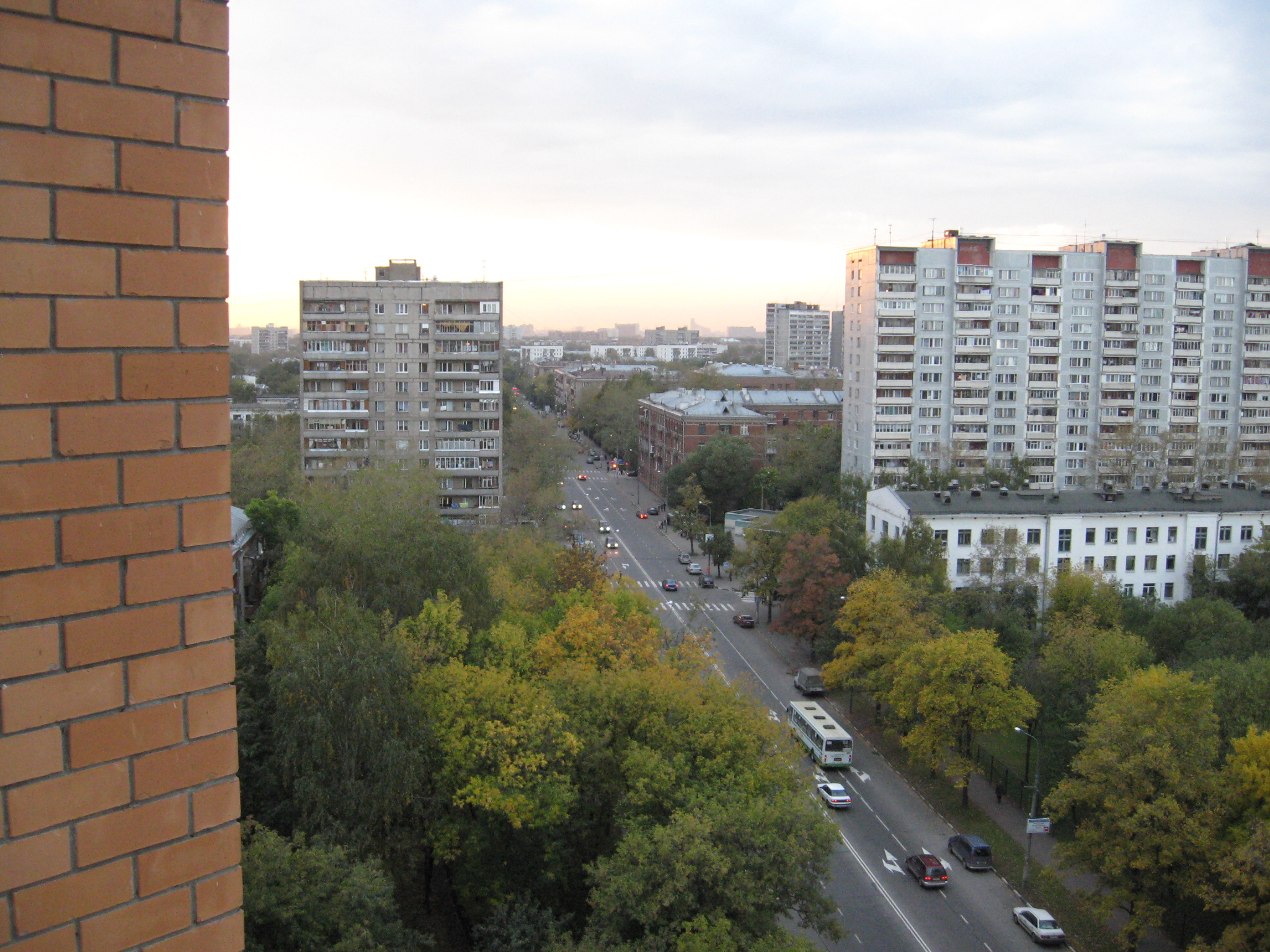
- Federativiny Prospekt, Novogireyevo District

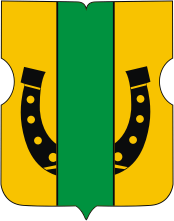
- Flag Coat of arms
- Location of Novogireyevo District on the map of Moscow
- Coordinates: 55°45′00″N 37°48′48″E
- Country: Russia
- Federal subject: Moscow
- Established: 5 July 1995

Area
  - Total: 4.45 km^{2} (1.72 sq mi)
- Time zone: UTC+
- OKTMO ID: 45309000
- Website: http://novogireevo.mos.ru/

Novogireyevo District (Russian: Новогиреево райо́н) is an administrative district (raion) of Eastern Administrative Okrug, and one of the 125 raions of Moscow, Russia. The area of the district is 4.45 square kilometers (1.72 sq mi).

== Politics ==
=== Municipal Assembly ===
The Municipal Assembly is the representative body of the district. It consists of deputies elected in municipal elections by residents of the district. According to the results of the 2008 elections, 12 people entered the Municipal Assembly of the Novogireevo district. Of these, 8 were nominated by the United Russia political party, 1 by the Communist Party of the Russian Federation, and 3 were self-nominated candidates.

== See also ==
- Administrative divisions of Moscow
