= 2005 Moscow City Duma election =

- 4 December 2005
- Turnout: 34.75% ▲4.28 pp
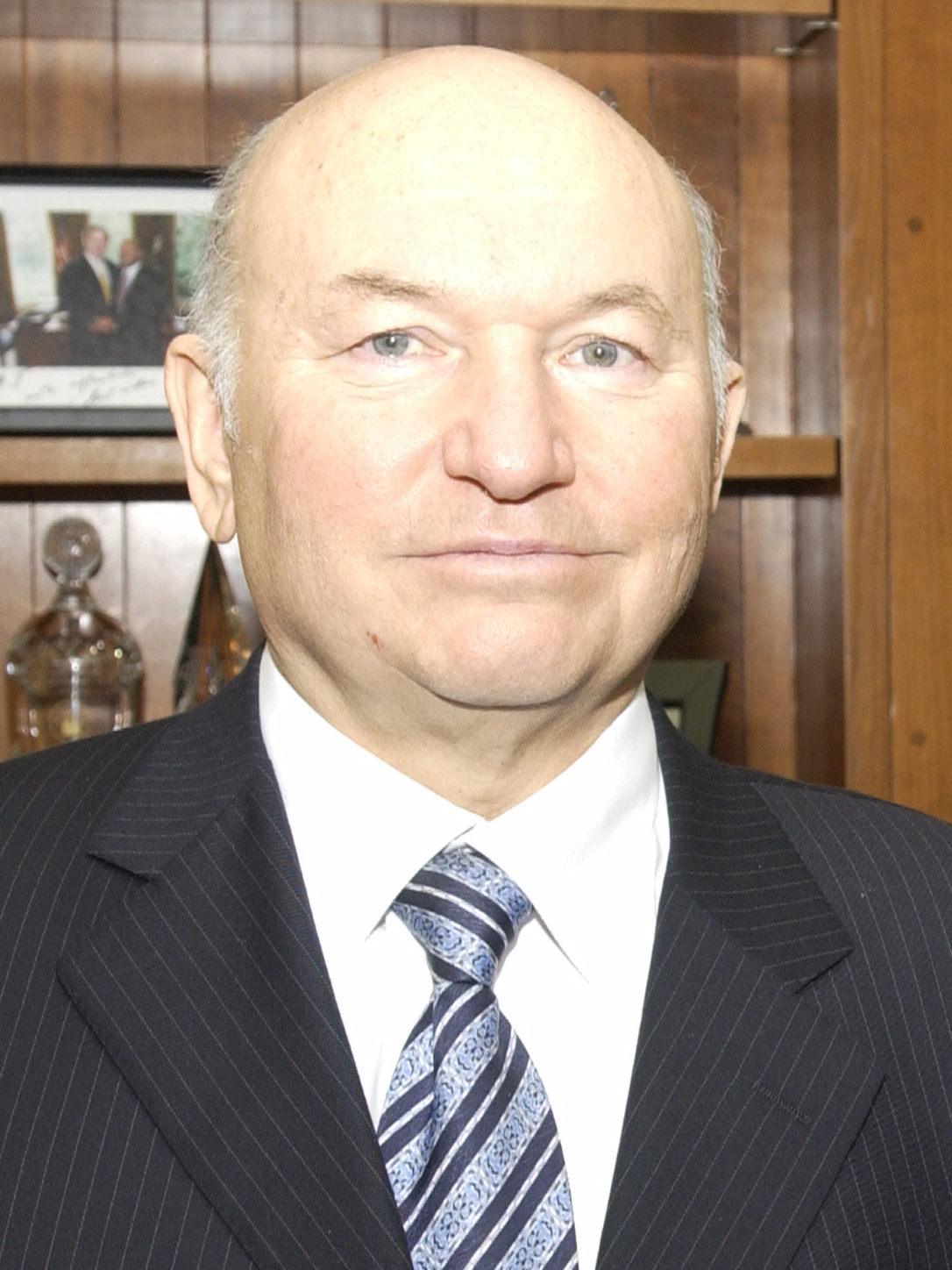

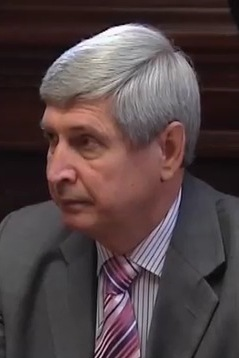

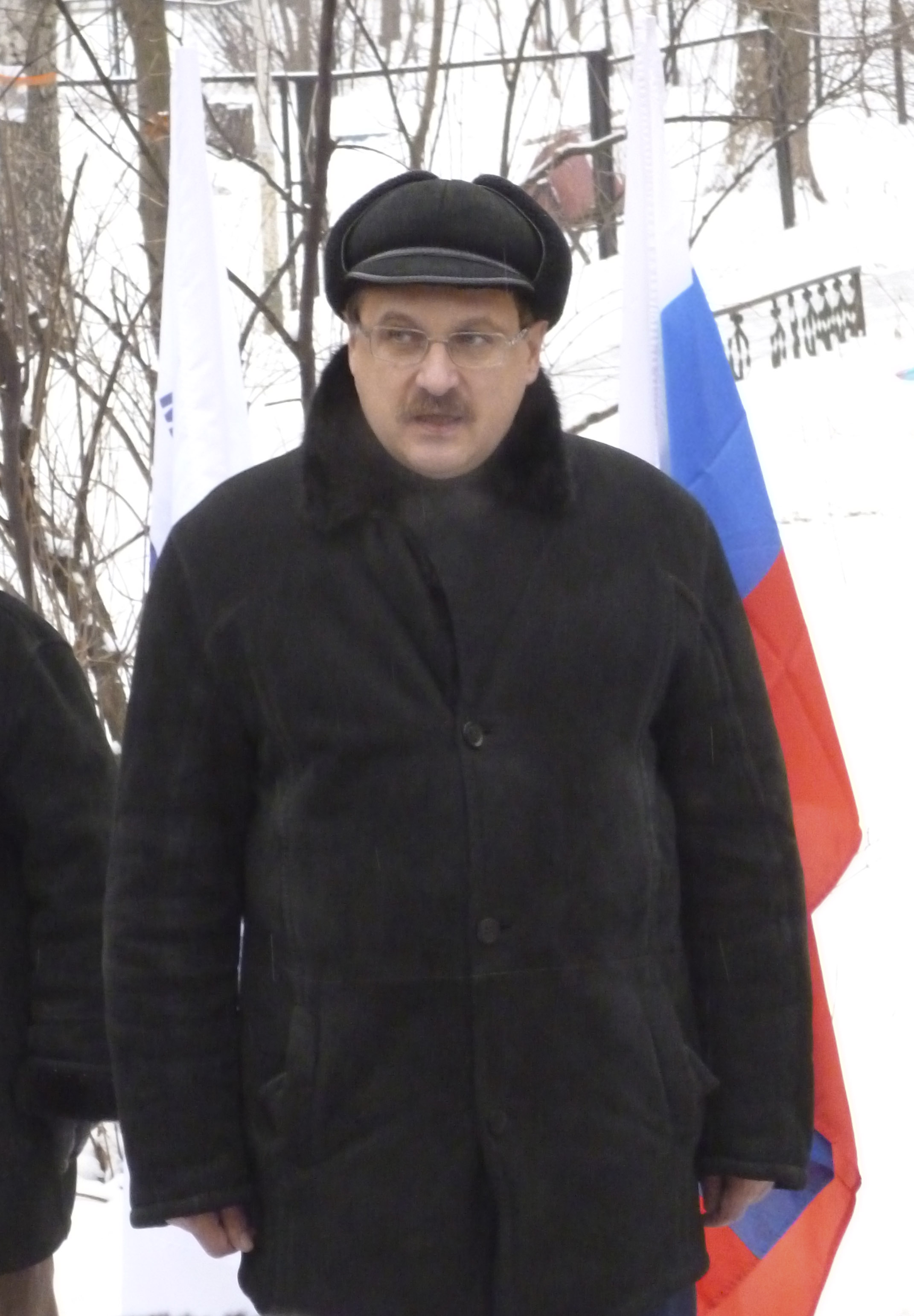
	First party	Second party	Third party
Leader	Yury Luzhkov	Ivan Melnikov	Ivan Novitsky
Party	United Russia	CPRF	Yabloko
Last election	–	0 seats	4 seats
Seats won	28	4	3
Seat change	New	▲4	▼1
Popular vote	1,132,523	401,405	266,295
Percentage	47.25%	16.75%	11.11%
Chairman before election
Vladimir Platonov
SPS
Elected Chairman
Vladimir Platonov
United Russia

The Moscow legislative election of 2005 was held on 4 December of that year to the fourth convocation of the Moscow City Duma. On party lists via proportional representation were elected 18 of the 35 deputies, while 17 deputies were in single-member constituencies. To get into the City Duma via a party list, parties need to overcome the 10% threshold. The term of office of the new City Duma was four years.

== Background ==
On 6 November 2005, Rodina was barred from taking part in the December elections to the Moscow Duma following a complaint filed by the Liberal Democratic Party of Russia that Rodina's advertising campaign incited racial hatred. The advertisement in question showed Caucasian immigrants tossing watermelon rinds to the ground and ended with the slogan "Let's clear our city of trash", calling for Russians to clean their cities of rubbish. It garnered much controversy and opinion polls predicted that Rodina would come second with close to 25% in the December vote. Rodina leader Dmitry Rogozin appealed the decision, but the ban was upheld on 1 December 2005.

== Results ==
First place in the voting by party lists was United Russia, which received 47.25% of the vote (13 seats). The 10-percent barrier was overcome by two other parties, the Communist Party (16.75%, 4 seats) and United Democrats who participated in the elections under the banner of Yabloko (11.11%, 3 mandates).

United Russia also won all 15 single-member districts. Thus, the party won 28 seats out of 35 total. The list of United Russia party was headed by the mayor of Moscow, Yuri Luzhkov, who helped them to improve the results in Moscow compared to the 2003 Russian legislative election (in December 2003 United Russia received 34.43% of the vote).

Party	Party-list			Constituency			Total seats
Party	Votes	%	Seats	Votes	%	Seats	Total seats
United Russia	1,132,523	47.25	13	1,046,233	44.56	15	28
Communist Party	401,405	16.75	4	335,582	14.29	0	4
Yabloko	266,295	11.11	3	84,884	3.62	0	3
Liberal Democratic Party	191,833	8.00	0	120,108	5.12	0	0
Russian Party of Life	114,329	4.77	0	71,888	3.06	0	0
The Greens	63,172	2.64	0	–	–	–	0
Free Russia	53,204	2.22	0	–	–	–	0
Party of Social Justice	29,220	1.22	0	–	–	–	0
People's Will	14,316	0.60	0	–	–	–	0
Rodina	–	–	–	199,541	8.50	0	0
Social Democratic Party	–	–	–	22,450	0.96	0	0
Agrarian Party	–	–	–	19,283	0.82	0	0
Independents	–	–	–	300,551	12.80	0	0
Valid ballots	2,266,297	94.56		2,200,520	93.72		
Invalid ballots	130,378	5.44		147,547	6.28		
Total	2,396,675	99.16	20	2,348,067	99.12	15	35
Refused ballots	20,299	0.84		20,784	0.88		
Registered voters/turnout	6,954,834	34.75		6,916,718	34.25		

Party performance per district

United Russia

Communist Party

Yabloko

LDPR

Turnout
