= 2019 Moscow City Duma election =

Election held in Moscow, Russia

- 8 September 2019
- Turnout: 21.77% ▲0.73 pp

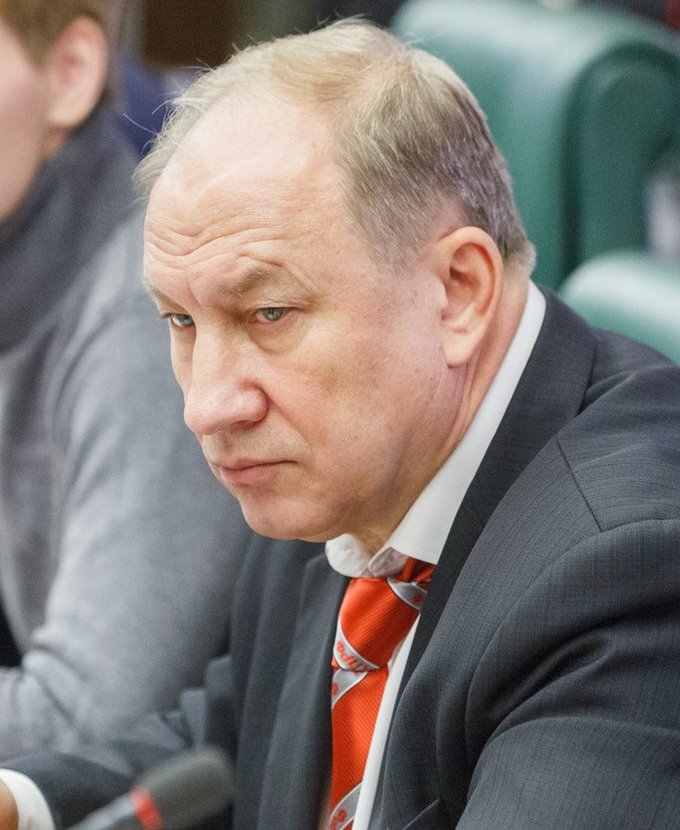

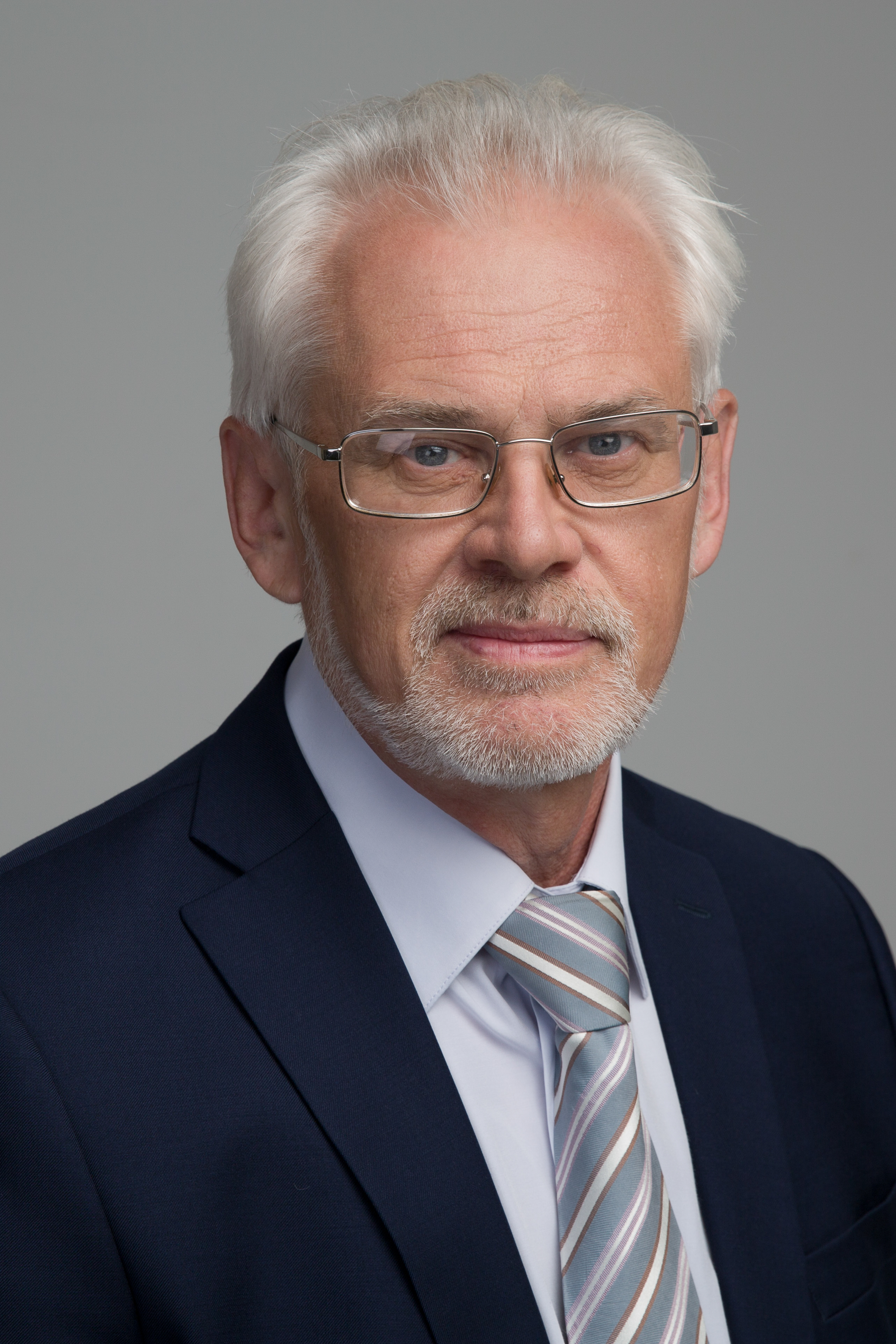

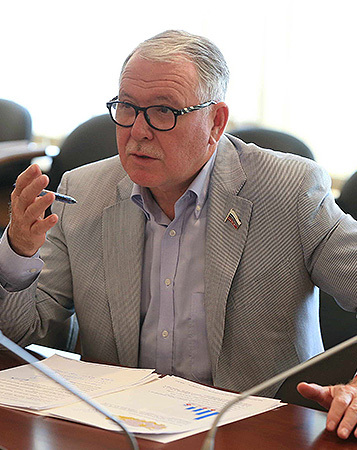

	First party	Second party	Third party
Leader	Andrey Metelsky	Valery Rashkin	Valery Goryachev
Party	United Russia	CPRF	Yabloko
Last election	38 seats	5 seats	0 seats
Seats won	25	13	4
Seat change	▼13	▲8	▲4
Popular vote	495,591	499,643	63,193
Percentage	31.15%	31.40%	4.13%
	Fourth party	Fifth party	Sixth party
Leader	Alexander Romanovich	Mikhail Monakhov	Andrey Shibaev
Party	A Just Russia	LDPR	Rodina
Last election	0 seats	1 seat	1 seat
Seats won	3	0	0
Seat change	▲3	▼1	▼1
Popular vote	196,896	138,145	12,187
Percentage	12.85%	9.02%	0.80%
- Results of the election by district

Election to the 7th convocation of the Moscow City Duma took place on the United Voting Day on 8 September 2019. The elections were held under first-past-the-post voting system, which saw 45 deputies being elected in their respective single-member districts amidst the 2019 Moscow protests, which saw huge rallies in support of independent opposition candidates. The term of the new Duma will be five years.

== Background and preparations ==
The Moscow City Election Commission organizes 3,616 polling stations, of which 3,440 are at the places of residence, and 176 are at places of temporary residence (hospitals, sanatoriums, places of temporary detention of suspects and accused, and other places of temporary stay).

Candidates for registration must collect voter signatures in their support in the amount of 3% of all constituency voters (from 4,500 to 5,500 signatures). However, regardless of whether a candidate has enough valid signatures, a candidate will not be on the ballot if more than 10% of the signatures are considered flawed by the Moscow City Election Commission (MCEC).

Candidates nominated by political parties represented in the State Duma (United Russia, CPRF, LDPR, A Just Russia) could nominate their candidates without collecting signatures. However, United Russia did not formally nominate any persons, instead in an attempt to gain election support from low information voters, the party endorsed several self-nominee (independent) candidates due to United Russia's unpopularity amongst the Moscow electorate. In an attempt to potentially prevent a number of independent candidates (affiliated with the United Russia) to be elected for the Moscow City Duma, opposition politician Alexei Navalny launched the “Smart Voting” project, which urged Russian citizens to strategically vote towards any presumably strongest candidates who were not supporters of the United Russia.

On 26 July 2019, the "Liberal Mission" Foundation published a report entitled “Results of the nomination and registration at the elections of deputies of the Moscow City Duma on 8 September 2019”. According to the authors of the report Alexander Kenev, Arkady Lyubarev and Andrey Maximov, the results of registration of candidates for the MCD indicate electoral commission's inadequacy and injustice, suggesting that there was an unequal approach and even discrimination in the process of registering candidates.

== Constituencies ==
The current constituencies' boundaries were adopted on 30 April 2014. According to independent experts, they contain marks of gerrymandering.

The list of constituencies and candidates. In central, southwestern and northwestern constituencies the independent opposition candidates had strong chances (see also 2013 Moscow mayoral election, districts where Navalny had good results), in most of other constituencies the strongest opponent is a CPRF candidate. However, some strong candidates, even nominated by political parties represented in the State Duma, were excluded from the race. In constituency 43 no pro-United Russia candidates are registered.

No.	Voters	required signatures	United Russia candidate	Strongest opponent	Opponent's affiliation	Opponent's status
1	170,190	5,106	Andrei Titov	Ivan Ulyanchenko	Communist party	Registered (party nomination)
2	174,313	5,230	Svetlana Volovets	Gennady Gudkov	independent, Gudkov's team	Rejected (more than 10% signatures flawed)
3	177,162	5,315	Sabina Tsvetkova	Timur Abushaev	Communist Party	Excluded ("-" instead of "don't have" in the column "foreign property")
4	175,445	5,264	Mariya Kiselyova	Zoya Shargatova	independent, green	Rejected (more than 10% signatures flawed)
5	177,149	5,315	Roman Babayan	Dmitry Gudkov	independent, Gudkov's team	Rejected (more than 10% signatures flawed)
6	173,647	5,210	Mikhail Balykhin	Evgeny Bunimovich	independent, Yabloko	Registered (signatures accepted)
7	171,081	5,133	Nadezhda Perfilova	Pyotr Zvyagintsev	Communist Party	Registered (party nomination)
8	176,983	5,310	Ekaterina Kopeikina	Ivan Zhdanov	independent, Navalny's team	Rejected (more than 10% signatures flawed)
9	173,117	5,194	Andrei Medvedev	Yulia Galyamina	independent, Yabloko	Rejected (more than 10% signatures flawed)
10	176,136	5,285	Larisa Kartavtseva	Yury Dashkov	Communist Party	Registered (party nomination)
11	175,532	5,266	Yevgeny Nifantiev	Andrei Babushkin	independent, Yabloko	Rejected (more than 10% signatures flawed)
12	155,980	4,680	Alexei Shaposhnikov	Alexander Efimov	Communist Party	registered (party nomination)
13	166,862	5,006	Igor Buskin	Ilya Lifantsev	A Just Russia	registered (party nomination)
14	172,217	5,167	Natalia Pochinok	Sergei Tsukasov	independent, sup. Communist Party	excluded ("-" instead of "don't have" in the column "foreign property")
15	145,155	4,355	Andrey Metelsky	Sergei Savostyanov	Communist Party	registered (party nomination)
16	145,474	4,361	Anton Molev	Mikhail Timonov	A Just Russia	registered (party nomination)
17	145,676	4,371	Anastasia Tatulova	Victor Maximov	Communist Party	registered (party nomination)
18	145,147	4,355	Nikolai Tabashnikov	Yelena Yanchuk	Communist Party	registered (party nomination)
19	145,340	4,361	Irina Nazarova	Oleg Sheremetiev	Communist Party	registered (party nomination)
20	147,832	4,435	Maxim Shingarkin	Yevgeny Stupin	Communist Party	registered (party nomination)
21	156,741	4,703	Vera Shevchenko	Leonid Zyuganov	Communist Party	registered (party nomination)
22	152,760	4,583	Inna Svyatenko	Dmitry Saraev	Communist Party	registered (party nomination)
23	149,075	4,473	Yelena Nikolaeva	Yelena Gulicheva	Communist Party	registered (party nomination)
24	176,256	5,288	Igor Dyagilev	Pavel Tarasov	Communist Party	registered (party nomination)
25	148,276	4,449	Lyudmila Stebenkova	Andrei Orel	Communist Party	registered (party nomination)
26	147,175	4,416	Kirill Shchitov	Vladimir Kalinin	A Just Russia	registered (party nomination)
27	152,197	4,566	Stepan Orlov	Alexei Dryga	Communist Party	registered (party nomination)
28	150,374	4,512	Yelena Samyshina	Arkady Pavlinov	A Just Russia	registered (party nomination)
29	149,589	4,488	Oleg Artemyev	Nikolai Sergeev	Communist Party	registered (party nomination)
30	159,827	4,795	Margarita Rusetskaya	Roman Yuneman	independent	registered (signatures accepted)
31	148,433	4,453	Sergei Zverev	Konstantin Yankauskas	independent, Navalny's team	rejected (more than 10% signatures flawed)
32	149,141	4,475	Olga Melnikova	Klim Likhachev	Communist Party	registered (party nomination)
33	176,224	5,287	Lyudmila Guseva	Vladimir Burmistrov	independent, Right Bloc	rejected (more than 10% signatures flawed)
34	166,292	4,989	Alexander Semennikov	Yulia Gladkova	Communist Party	registered (party nomination)
35	175,756	5,273	Natalia Metlina	Sergei Vasiliev	A Just Russia	registered (party nomination)
36	145,107	4,354	Olga Sharapova	Sergei Kurgansky	Communist Party	registered (party nomination)
37	174,072	5,223	Alexander Romanovich	Yelena Rusakova	independent, Yabloko	rejected (more than 10% signatures flawed)
38	174,943	5,249	Alexander Kozlov	Igor Glek	A Just Russia	registered (party nomination)
39	155,001	4,651	Valery Golovchenko	Alexander Vidmanov	Communist Party	registered (party nomination)
40	170,305	5,110	Tatiana Batysheva	Igor Sukhanov	Communist Party	registered (party nomination)
41	162,735	4,883	Yevgeny Gerasimov	Olga Frolova	Communist Party	registered (party nomination)
42	160,090	4,803	Kirill Nikitin	Anastasia Bryukhanova	independent, Yabloko	rejected (more than 10% signatures flawed)
43	149,685	4,491	Anna Federmesser (withdrew)	Lyubov Sobol	independent, Navalny's team	rejected (more than 10% signatures flawed)
44	159,496	4,785	Ilya Sviridov	Yelena Shuvalova	Communist Party	registered (party nomination)
45	150,228	4,507	Valeria Kasamara	Ilya Yashin	independent, Navalny's team	rejected (more than 10% signatures flawed)

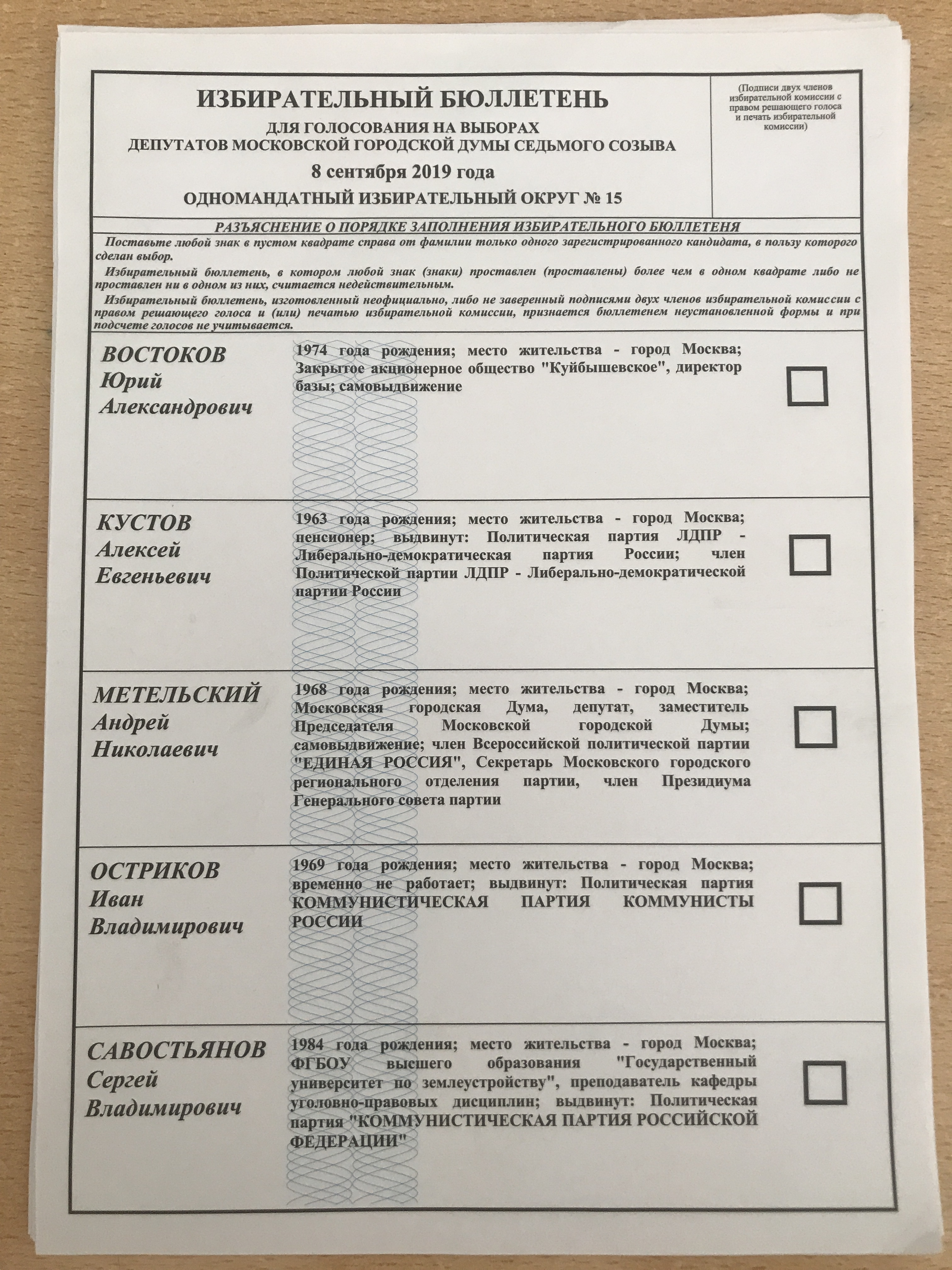
Ballot paper

Moscow constituencies. A different color for each one.

== Rejection of opposition candidacies ==
After the verification of the signatures collected by the candidates, the Moscow City Election Commission (MCEC) refused to register most of independent opposition candidates. The claimed reason was the high percentage of rejected signatures (exceeding permissible reject rate is 10%). Independent candidates accused the MCEC of forgery in verifying signatures aimed at prohibiting the opposition to participate in elections. During the verification some personal data of the signers was entered with errors. In addition, a significant part of the signatures was invalidated on the grounds of a so-called handwriting examination, which scientific validity and impartiality the candidates questioned. The candidates submitted to the MCEC statements confirming the validity of signatures from signatories, whose signatures were rejected on the grounds of handwriting examination. The candidates also submitted to the MCEC an opinion of professional handwriting experts on the insolvency of the MCEC examination. Despite this, the MCEC did not change the decision. In protest, one of the candidates, Lyubov Sobol, went on a hunger strike on July 13.

On the other hand, the MCEC registered 32 candidates from Communists of Russia party, which has very low popularity (during 2016 election to the State Duma it collected 2%). This party is regarded by experts as a spoiler for CPRF. These candidates are almost unknown in Moscow, mostly students, housewives and low-skilled workers. According to the MCEC, these 32 unknown candidates managed to collect the necessary signatures. However, Muscovites did not see any signature collectors for the candidates from Communists of Russia or pro-United Russia 'independent' candidates in the streets of their city. Later, an opposition newspaper Novaya Gazeta revealed that the same headquarters coordinates the actions of candidates from Communists of Russia and pro-United Russia 'independents'.

Starting from July 2019, numerous approved and unapproved rallies in Moscow took place. Rallies on Sakharov Avenue on July 20 and August 10, 2019, became the largest political rallies in Russia after the 2011–2013 protests and the rally on 27 July 27 established a record high for the number of detainees. The protests were accompanied by massive administrative arrests of unregistered independent candidates and two criminal cases: the obstructing the work of election commissions case and the riots case (also known as the Moscow case).

== Campaign ==
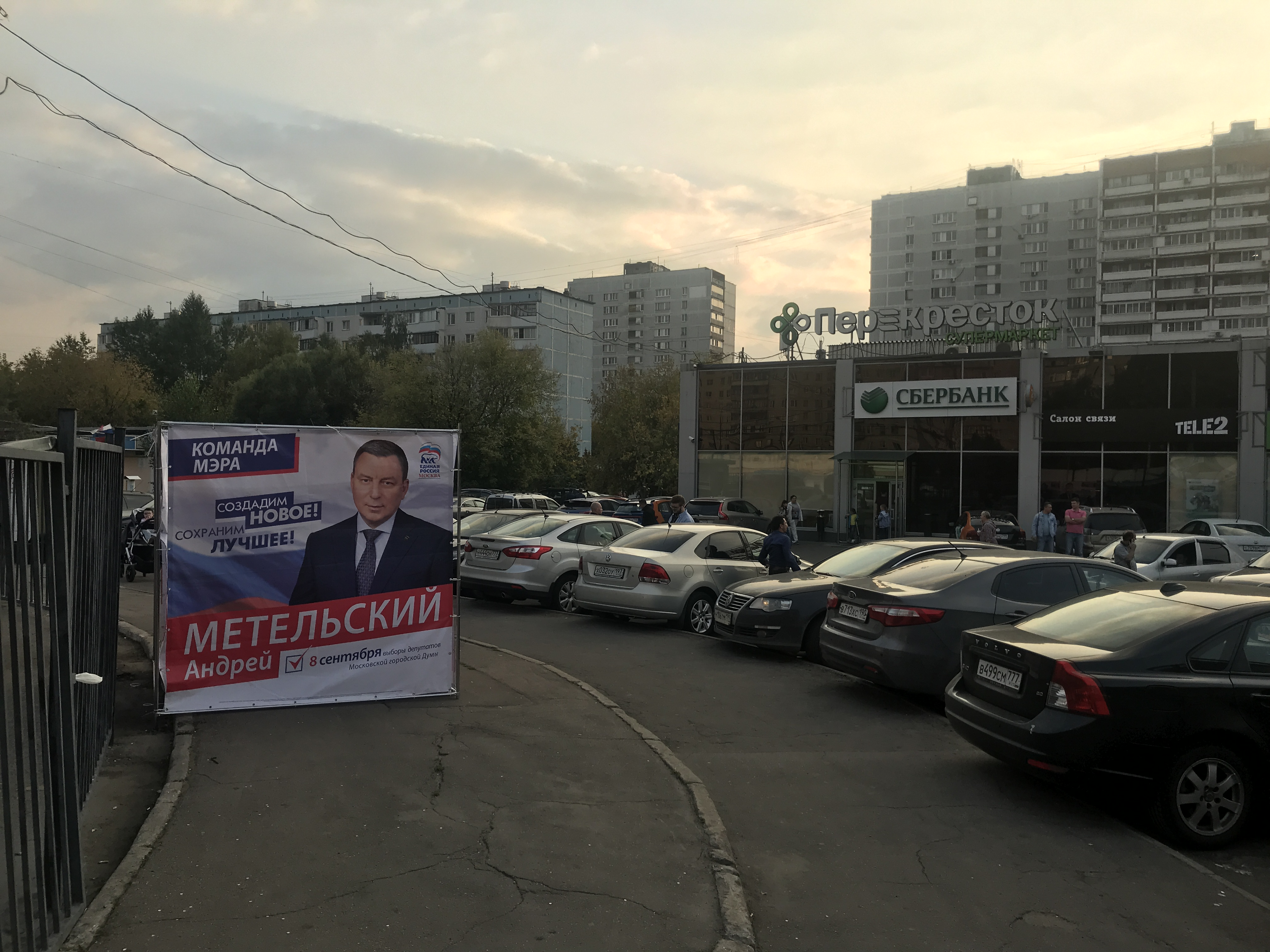
Metelsky agitation cube

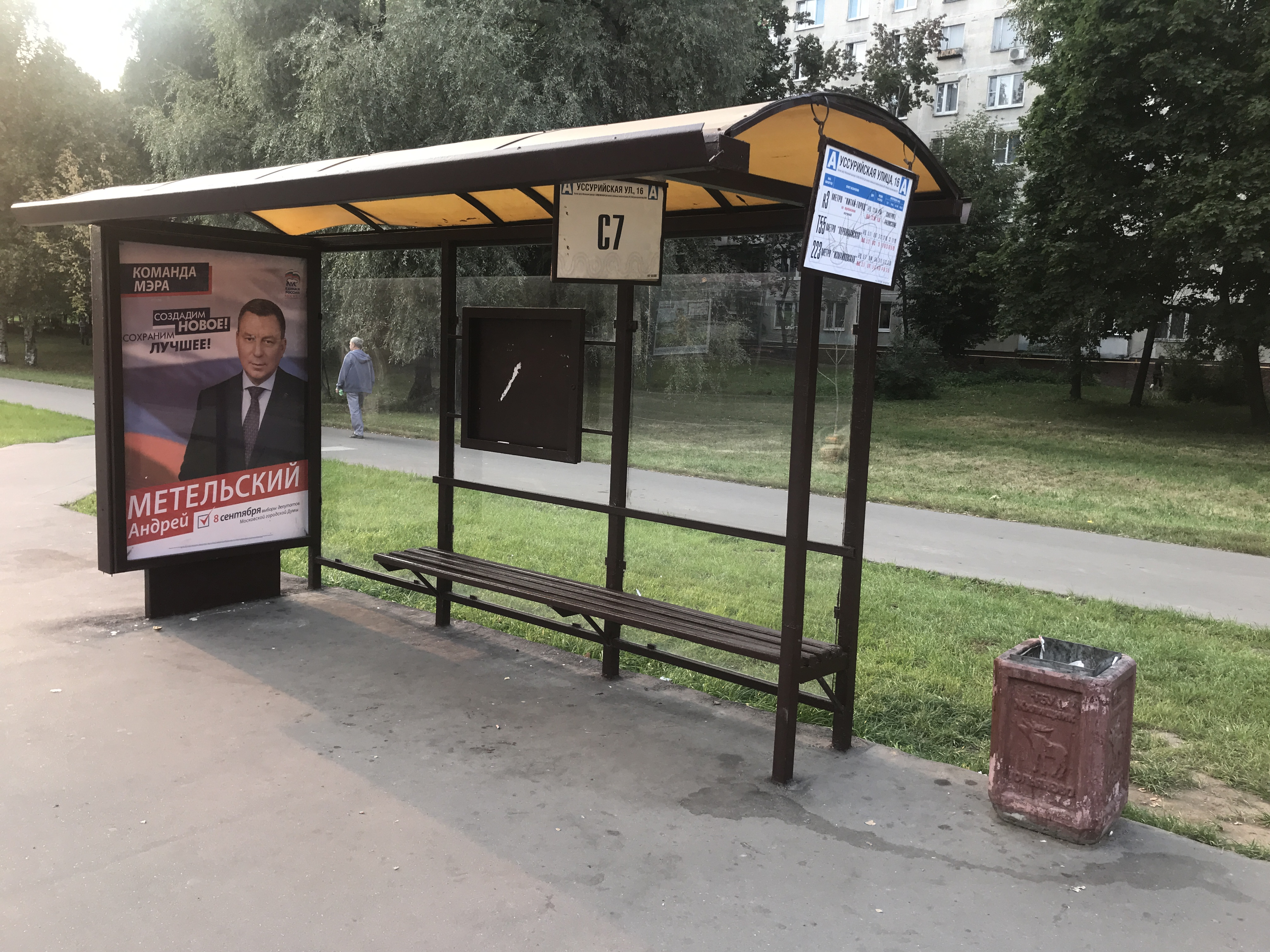
Metelsky poster on bus stop

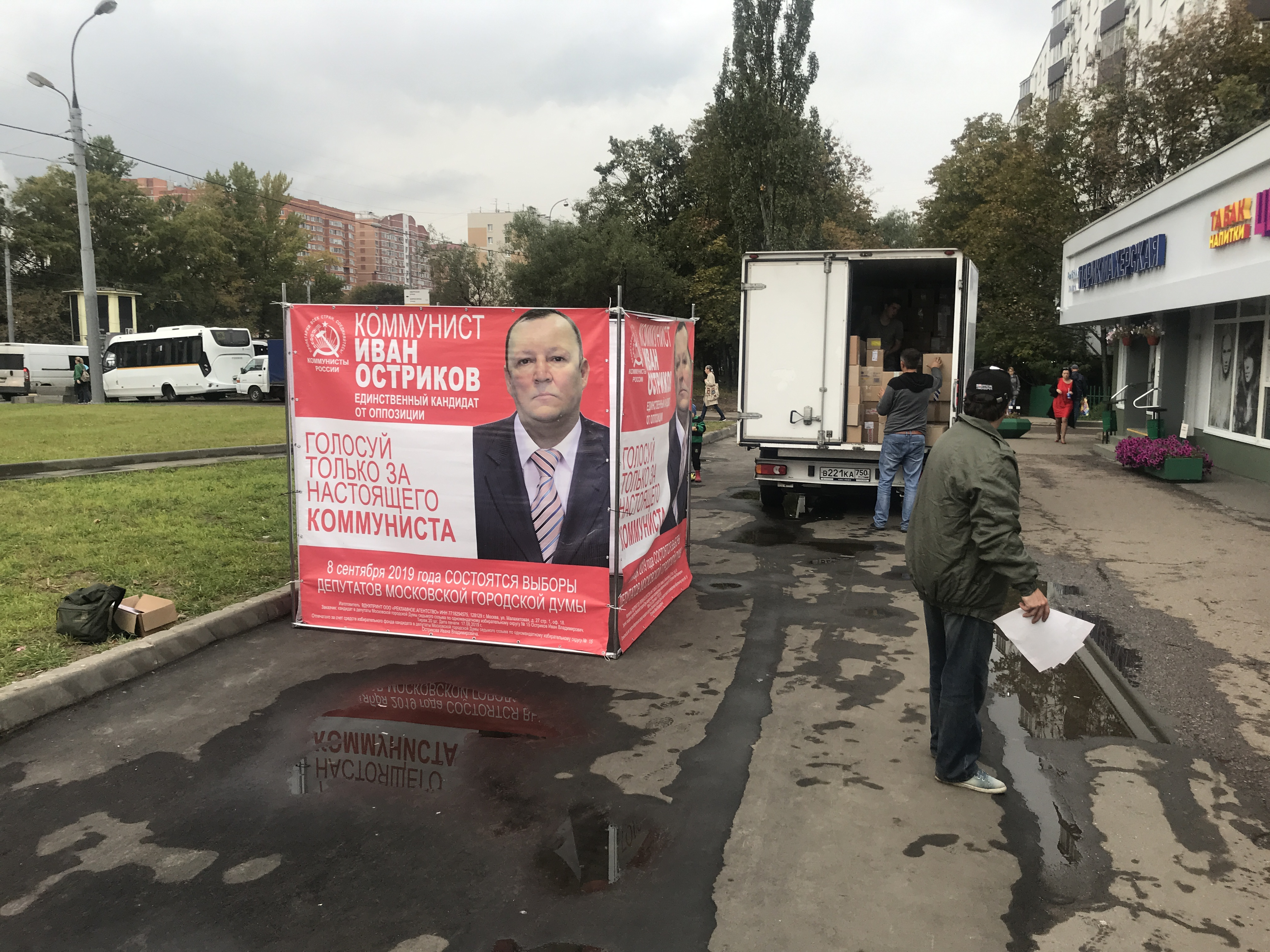
Communists of Russia agitation cube, stilyzed under CPRF

=== Pro-United Russia candidates ===
Positive articles about pro-United Russia candidates began to appear in district newspapers six months before the official start of the race, thus allowing to identify them. Pro-United Russia candidates received 800 mln rubles (~12.5 mln USD) from funds affiliated with United Russia for their campaigns. All other candidates had significantly less resources. Pro-United Russia candidates actively used outdoor advertising and promoted in various media.

Shortly before election day, fake "smart vote" (see below) posters with wrong candidate began to appear. For example, posters were actively distributed in constituency 15, stating that "Navalny supports candidate Ostrikov from the Communists of Russia party", while "smart vote" supported the candidate from the CPRF Savostianov. Also, in some constituencies, Communist of Russia party candidates from Russia became more active, though they show no activity during most of the campaign. Their posters and agitation cubes were made as similar as possible to the posters and agitation cubes of candidates from the CPRF.

=== Non-system opposition ===
Non-system opposition figures divided in their opinion on participation in the elections.

Alexei Navalny offered a "smart vote" tactic, which boils down to voting for the most popular candidate among the parliamentary opposition or the independents, in order to prevent a United Russia domination. They marked with a (*) in the list below. The FBK has issued many anti-corruption investigations in support of the "smart vote".

Mikhail Khodorkovsky made a site with candidates' opinion on detainees during 2019 Moscow protests. His site was heavily criticised due to mentioning Valeria Kasamara among the supporters of the detainees, what was seen as a hypocrisy given her support by the United Russia and Sobyanin.

Dmitry Gudkov made a short list of worthy candidates. They marked with a (¤) below.

Garry Kasparov called to boycott the elections.

=== FBK Investigations ===
During the 2019 Moscow City Duma elections campaign the FBK published a lot of anti-corruption investigations against Moscow City Duma deputies from the United Russia faction, the CEC and the MCEC members and Moscow City officials. Even authorities later admitted that FBK investigations had a significant impact on protest activity and election results.

On July 1, the FBK published an investigation of Andrey Metelsky's, the leader of the United Russia faction in the Moscow City Duma, property. He has been a deputy in the Moscow City Duma since 2001. His son and 75 years old mother owns hotels Maximilian (bought for 5.36 mln €), Tirolerhof (3.6 mln €), Mozart (7 mln €), Strudlhof (24 mln €) in Austria, multi-apartment complex "Lefort", built near the MosMetro station under construction Lefortovo, auto center network "Obukhov", 2 "Tanuki" restaurants, hotel "Foresta" and 4 apartments with a total area of 1700 m2 in Moscow, 3 houses in Moscow Oblast and 1 house in Kaliningrad Oblast. The total cost of his real estate in Moscow only is about 5.7 billion rubles (~ US$90 mln).

On July 18, the FBK published an investigations of the head of the MCEC Valentin Gorbunov's property. His family owns two apartments with a total area of 200 m2 worth US$420 000 in Ika, Croatia.

On July 22, the FBK revealed that pro-government journalist Vladimir Solovyov has an Italian permanent residency.

On August 1, the FBK published an investigation of the vice-mayor Natalya Sergunina's property. Sergunina is responsible for the election process in Moscow. The FBK estimates Sergunina's (along with close relatives) undeclared real estate value at 6.5 billion rub (~ US$100 mln).

On August 12, the FBK published an investigation of the member of the CEC Boris Ebzeev's property. His grandson at the age of 4 bought an apartment worth 500 mln rub (~ US$18.5 mln), and at the age of 7 a house in Moscow Oblast.

On August 12, it was revealed that the MCEC member Dmitry Reut bought an apartment worth 22 mln rub (~US$0.8 mln) from the city of Moscow on unknown conditions. The cost of the apartment exceeds his income for previous years by 2 times.

On August 15, the FBK published an investigation of Alexei Shaposhnikov's, the chairman of the Moscow City Duma, property. He owns an apartment in the center of Moscow with a total area of 270 m2 worth 95 mln rub (~US$1.5 mln).

On August 20, the FBK published an investigation of Ilya Platonov's, the son of the former chairman of the Moscow City Duma Vladimir Platonov, property. He owns an apartment in the center of Moscow, on the "golden mile", with a total area of 372 m2 worth 600 mln rub (~US$9.4 mln) and a house in Moscow Oblast with total area of 4000 m2 worth 4000 mln rub (~US$62.5 mln). The Moscow "Golden mile" is an extremely expensive part of Moscow between Ostozhenka street and Prechistenskaya embarkment, where the price of an apartment start from US$25 000 per m2.

On August 22, the FBK published an investigation of Vladimir Regnatsky's, the head of Security and Anti-Corruption Department of Moscow City, property. Regnatsky is one of those officials who "approves" rallies and is responsible for their dispersing. His mother owns an apartment in the center of Moscow, on the "golden mile", with total area of 146 m2 worth 200 mln rub (~US$3.1 mln).

On August 26, the FBK published an investigation of the vice-mayor Alexander Gorbenko's property. Along with his son and wife he owns a land plot with total area of 20 000 m2 in Moscow Oblast, where 9 houses built, worth 500 mln rub (~US$7.8 mln).

On August 27, the FBK published an investigation of Alexander Gorbenko's children's property. His son owns an apartment in the center of Moscow with total area of 226 m2 worth 300 mln rub (~US$4.7 mln), and his daughter owns an apartment in the center of Moscow with total area of 174 m2 worth 240 mln rub (~US$3.8 mln).

On August 29, the FBK published second investigation of Andrey Metelsky's property. He owns and manages a motorcycle shop "Alpine", while the Russian legislation prohibits deputies from doing business.

On August 30, the FBK published an investigation of the vice-chairman of the CEC Nikolay Bulaev's property. Along with his daughter he owns 3 apartments in Moscow with total area of 392 m2 worth 220 mln rub (~US$3.4 mln).

On September 2, the FBK published an investigation of the deputy of the Moscow City Duma Lyudmila Stebenkova's property. She owns an apartment in the center of Moscow with total area of 197 m2 worth 80 mln rub (~US$1.25 mln) and owned 1 more apartment with total area of 178 m2 which she sold in 2005.

On September 3, the FBK published an investigation of the deputy of the Moscow City Duma Stepan Orlov's property. He received from the City of Moscow two apartments in the center of Moscow with total area of 246 m2 in exchange of his old apartment with total area of 58 m2.

On September 4, the FBK published an investigation of the deputy of the Moscow City Duma Kirill Shchitov's property. He owns an apartment in center of Moscow, on the "golden mile", with total area of 180 m2 and one more with total area of 122 m2, and also two luxury cars.

On September 5, the FBK published an investigation of the vice-mayor Pyotr Biryukov's property. Along with his family he owns 17 apartments in the center of Moscow, 22 luxury cars and a farm estate in Moscow Oblast total worth of 5.5 bln rub (~US$86 mln).

On September 6, the FBK published second investigation of the vice-mayor Natalya Sergunina's property. Her daughter's husband, Aaron-Elizer Aronov, owns the "Aviapark" mall worth of 4.3 bln rub (~US$67.2 mln). Besides, the building company, belonging to Aronov, did not fulfill its social obligations to build a school and museum nearby.

=== Government response to investigations ===
The government responded to these investigations with criminal prosecution and mass raids on the FBK offices.

== Results ==
Party	Votes	%	Seats	+/–
United Russia	495,591	32.35	25	-13
Communist Party	499,643	32.62	13	+8
Yabloko	63,193	4.13	4	+4
A Just Russia	196,896	12.85	3	+3
LDPR	138,145	9.02	0	-1
Communists of Russia	79,062	5.16	0	–
Rodina	12,187	0.80	0	-1
The Greens	2,155	0.14	0	–
Civilian Power	1,945	0.13	0	–
Party of Growth	1,253	0.08	0	–
Independents	41,802	2.73	0	–
Total	1,531,872	100.00	45	–
Valid votes	1,531,872	96.28		
Invalid/blank votes	59,182	3.72		
Total votes	1,591,054	100.00		
Registered voters/turnout	7,308,469	21.77		

The results show the success of the "smart voting" strategy: none of the United Russia candidates had 50+% (in 2014 there were 16 such candidates), and only one had 45+% support. All 6 close cases, when the difference between two leading candidates was less than 600 votes, resulted in the victory of United Russia's candidate (constituencies 7, 9, 30, 32, 34, 36).

However, political analysts Ivan Bolshakov and Vladimir Perevalov suggest that a high assessment of this strategy is emotional rather than scientific. They conclude that the success of the opposition can be explained by the combination of two factors: the increase in protest sentiments, which reduced the electoral base of the pro-government nominees, and the decrease in the level of competition inside the opposition, due to both the “smart voting” strategy and disqualification of candidates. These factors ensured the flow of votes away from the administrative candidates and weak opposition members to the most powerful opposition candidates. “Smart voting” contributed to this victory, but did not determine the overall outcome of the elections. Its quantitative effect amounted to 5.6% of the vote. Moreover, while “smart voting” played a decisive role in the victory of several candidates, it deprived of victory approximately the same number of opposition representatives.

Constituencies 12, 16, 24 among other candidates contained spoilers to opposition candidates with the same surnames (and even name in const. 16). In constituency 10 the surname of the candidate from Communists of Russia party is also similar to the surname of the candidate from CPRF.

By 22:30 September 9 the data input of the results was halted, and renewed only in the early morning, around 3-4 a.m. of September 10. In the constituency 15, where the leader of the United Russia's faction Andrey Metelsky tried to re-elect, the input renewed only around 5:30 a.m.

The leader of the Moscow branch of CPRF Valery Rashkin stated that in constituencies 7, 25, 32, 36 victories of United Russia's candidates were caused by few (or even one) polling stations with an abnormally high percent of votes for the United Russia's candidate. For example, polling station 1753, constituency 32 (Likhachev - 171, Melnikova - 930). He also doubted the integrity of the electronic voting, which was practised in constituencies 1, 10 and 30, and resulted in an abnormally high percentage of votes for the United Russia's candidate.

The results for constituency 30 are suspicious not only due to electronic voting results, but also due to results in the neuropsychiatric dispensary (polling station 2047: Rusetskaya - 122, Yuneman - 6, Zhukovsky - 23), given that the final lead of Rusetskaya over Yuneman is only 84 votes. Electronic voting (polling stations 5001, 5002 and 5003) results provided separately below.

Navalny stated that in constituencies 25, 32, 36 (all abnormally high percent for United Russia candidate in few polling stations), 1, 30 (both electronic voting) the victory of the non-United Russia candidate was stolen.

Even given these facts, the opposition received the largest number of seats in Moscow City Duma since 1990s. The "smart vote" candidates collected 586,286 votes altogether, while Pro-United Russia candidates collected 555,063 votes.

31 self-promoted candidates from Communists of Russia party collected only 79062 votes altogether, though they had submitted around 160 000 signatures from voters to participate in elections.

=== By constituency ===
==== District 1 ====
Candidate	Party	Votes	%	+/–
Andrei Titov	United Russia	16,136	40.15	–4.00
Ivan Ulyachenko	Communist Party	14,165	35.24	+20.4
Svetlana Nikituskina	A Just Russia	3,403	8.47	–3.37
Olga Zhagina	Communists of Russia	3,332	8.29	New
Vyacheslav Milovanov	LDPR	3,156	7.85	+0.11
Total		40,192	100.00	–
Valid votes		40,192	96.45	
Invalid/blank votes		1,478	3.55	
Total votes		41,670	100.00	
Registered voters/turnout		165,604	25.16	
United Russia hold				

==== District 2 ====
Candidate	Party	Votes	%	+/–
Dmitry Loktev	Communist Party	15,091	41.37	+18.88
Svetlana Volovets	United Russia	14,079	38.59	New
Andrei Petrov	LDPR	3,456	9.47	+5.73
Vladislav Zhukov	A Just Russia	2,809	7.70	–2.35
Pavel Rassudov	Self-promotion	1,046	2.87	New
Total		36,481	100.00	–
Valid votes		36,481	96.84	
Invalid/blank votes		1,189	3.16	
Total votes		37,670	100.00	
Registered voters/turnout		175,024	21.52	
Communist Party gain				

2019 Moscow City Duma elections results
Const.	turnout	name	party	result	
Const.	turnout	name	party	votes	%
3	20.86%	Alexander Solovyov	A Just Russia *	13578	36.52 %
3	20.86%	Sabina Tsvetkova	United Russia	12795	34.42 %
3	20.86%	Leonid Voskresensky	Communists of Russia	8010	21.55 %
3	20.86%	Yury Shevchenko	LDPR	2792	7.51 %
4	20.87%	Maria Kiselyova	United Russia	14835	42.74 %
4	20.87%	Sergei Desyatkin	Communist Party *	12598	36.29 %
4	20.87%	Darya Mitina	Communists of Russia	3589	10.34 %
4	20.87%	Vladimir Bessonov	LDPR	2348	6.76 %
4	20.87%	Eric Lobakh	A Just Russia	1344	3.87 %
5	22.11%	Roman Babayan	United Russia	18524	48.74 %
5	22.11%	Anastasia Udaltsova	Communist Party*	15598	41.05 %
5	22.11%	Ksenia Domozhirova	A Just Russia	2196	5.78 %
5	22.11%	Alexei Litvinov	LDPR	1685	4.43 %
6	22.51%	Evgeny Bunimovich	Yabloko *¤	16732	41.90 %
6	22.51%	Mikhail Balykhin	United Russia	11449	28.66 %
6	22.51%	Alexei Melnikov	Communist Party	6921	17.33 %
6	22.51%	Natalia Krutskikh	Communists of Russia	2496	6.25 %
6	22.51%	Alexei Pochernin	LDPR	2341	5.86 %
7	21.22%	Nadezhda Perfilova	United Russia	12909	37.02 %
7	21.22%	Pyotr Zvyagintsev	Communist Party *	12772	36.63 %
7	21.22%	Anton Verbenkin	LDPR	3371	9.67 %
7	21.22%	Pavel Kushakov	A Just Russia	3132	8.98 %
7	21.22%	Konstantin Zhukov	Communists of Russia	2686	7.70 %
8	23.20%	Darya Besedina	Yabloko*¤	14911	37.60 %
8	23.20%	Vadim Kumin	Communist Party	12805	32.28 %
8	23.20%	Olga Panina	A Just Russia	5774	14.56 %
8	23.20%	Ekaterina Kopeykina	United Russia	2765	6.97 %
8	23.20%	Vasily Vlasov	LDPR	2153	5.43 %
8	23.20%	Yelena Lugovskaya	Party of Growth	1253	3.16 %
9	21.80%	Andrei Medvedev	United Russia	15580	41.63 %
9	21.80%	Nikolai Stepanov	Communist Party *	15067	40.26 %
9	21.80%	Ekaterina Bakasheva	Communists of Russia	2451	6.55 %
9	21.80%	Maya Galenkina	LDPR	2399	6.41 %
9	21.80%	Alisa Goluenko	A Just Russia	1928	5.15 %
10	21.35%	Larisa Kartavtseva	United Russia	15497	42.41 %
10	21.35%	Yury Dashkov	Communist Party *	10786	29.52 %
10	21.35%	Andrei Suvorov	A Just Russia	3894	10.66 %
10	21.35%	Alexei Kryukov	LDPR	3761	10.29 %
10	21.35%	Igor Dashkevich	Communists of Russia	2600	7.12 %
11	20.69%	Nikolai Zubrilin	Communist Party *	15775	44.75 %
11	20.69%	Yevgeny Nifantiev	United Russia	12167	34.52 %
11	20.69%	Yevgeny Rybin	LDPR	4593	13.03 %
11	20.69%	Alexander Luchin	A Just Russia	2715	7.70 %
12	22.54%	Alexei Shaposhnikov	United Russia	14227	42.16 %
12	22.54%	Alexander Efimov	Communist Party *	13087	38.78 %
12	22.54%	Maxim Efimov	LDPR	2613	7.74 %
12	22.54%	Nikita Yankovoy	A Just Russia	2358	6.98 %
12	22.54%	Pavel Trofimov	Communists of Russia	1463	4.34 %
13	21.65%	Igor Buskin	United Russia	11240	33.03 %
13	21.65%	Ilya Lifantsev	A Just Russia *	9028	26.53 %
13	21.65%	Alexander Potapov	Communist Party	8924	26.23 %
13	21.65%	Tatiana Kravchenko	LDPR	3263	9.59 %
13	21.65%	Denis Zommer	Communists of Russia	1573	4.62 %
14	23.06%	Maxim Kruglov	Yabloko *¤	15430	41.43 %
14	23.06%	Natalia Pochinok	United Russia	8939	24.00 %
14	23.06%	Georgy Fedorov	A Just Russia	5134	13.79 %
14	23.06%	Alexander Shkolnikov	self-promotion	3373	9.06 %
14	23.06%	Yevgeny Stepkin	LDPR	2328	6.25 %
14	23.06%	Dmitry Klochkov	self-promotion¤	2036	5.47 %
15	21.79%	Sergei Savostianov	Communist Party *	12955	43.50 %
15	21.79%	Andrey Metelsky	United Russia	9790	38.25 %
15	21.79%	Alexei Kustov	LDPR	2811	9.55 %
15	21.79%	Yuri Vostokov	self-promotion	2091	7.10 %
15	21.79%	Ivan Ostrikov	Communists of Russia	1797	6.10 %
16	23.02%	Mikhail Timonov	A Just Russia *¤	12293	37.57 %
16	23.02%	Anton Molev	United Russia	10419	31.85 %
16	23.02%	Alexandra Andreeva	Communist Party	5855	17.90 %
16	23.02%	Tatiana Gordienko	Communists of Russia	1466	4.48 %
16	23.02%	Vera Kosova	LDPR	1395	4.26 %
16	23.02%	Alexandra Andreeva	self-promotion	1290	3.94 %
17	20.14%	Victor Maximov	Communist Party *	13505	48.15 %
17	20.14%	Anastasia Tatulova	United Russia	8318	29.66 %
17	20.14%	Andrei Medvedkov	A Just Russia	3580	12.76 %
17	20.14%	Ilya Khovanets	LDPR	2645	9.43 %
18	25.39%	Elena Yanchuk	Communist Party *	15246	43.95 %
18	25.39%	Nikolai Tabashnikov	United Russia	8386	24.18 %
18	25.39%	Anton Medvedev	LDPR	4629	13.44 %
18	25.39%	Maria Marusenko	self-promotion	4516	13.82 %
18	25.39%	Darya Shestakova	A Just Russia	1912	5.51 %
19	20.83%	Oleg Sheremetiev	Communist Party *	12172	42.11 %
19	20.83%	Irina Nazarova	United Russia	11558	39.98 %
19	20.83%	Kirill Volkov	LDPR	2955	10.22 %
19	20.83%	Roman Ilyin	Communists of Russia	2224	7.69 %
20	23.44%	Yevgeny Stupin	Communist Party *	17496	47.39 %
20	23.44%	Maxim Shingarkin	Rodina (supported by United Russia)	8512	23.05 %
20	23.44%	Valery Danilovtsev	A Just Russia	4137	11.21 %
20	23.44%	Victor Bukreev	LDPR	3664	9.92 %
20	23.44%	Dmitry Zakharov	Communists of Russia	3112	8.43 %
21	19.77%	Leonid Zyuganov	Communist Party *	17233	60.39 %
21	19.77%	Vera Shevchenko	United Russia	5362	18.79 %
21	19.77%	Ekaterina Borodina	A Just Russia	3173	11.12 %
21	19.77%	Andrey Shakh	LDPR	2767	9.70 %
22	22.66%	Inna Svyatenko	United Russia	15190	46.97 %
22	22.66%	Dmitry Saraev	Communist Party *	11018	34.07 %
22	22.66%	Anton Egorov	LDPR	2475	7.65 %
22	22.66%	Dmitry Monastyrev	A Just Russia	1849	5.72 %
22	22.66%	Vladimir Badmaev	Communists of Russia	1809	5.59 %
23	20.47%	Elena Nikolaeva	United Russia	12119	43.63 %
23	20.47%	Elena Gulicheva	Communist Party *	10782	38.82 %
23	20.47%	Georgy Pomerancev	LDPR	2694	9.70 %
23	20.47%	Anton Bulatov	Communists of Russia	2183	7.85 %
24	23.07%	Pavel Tarasov	Communist Party *	15603	40.43 %
24	23.07%	Igor Dyagilev	United Russia	13241	34.32 %
24	23.07%	Nikolai Sheremetiev	LDPR	3105	8.05 %
24	23.07%	Anton Tarasov	self-promotion	2975	7.71 %
24	23.07%	Ekaterina Abramenko	A Just Russia	2565	6.65 %
24	23.07%	Alexei Balobutkin	Communists of Russia	1095	2.84 %
25	21.70%	Lyudmila Stebenkova	United Russia	11600	38.83 %
25	21.70%	Andrei Orel	Communist Party *	10488	35.10 %
25	21.70%	Denis Merkulov	LDPR	2967	9.94 %
25	21.70%	Sergei Smirnov	Civilian Power	1945	6.51 %
25	21.70%	Dmitry Rakitin	Communists of Russia	1344	4.50 %
25	21.70%	Vladislav Kotsyuba	A Just Russia	887	2.97 %
25	21.70%	Stanislav Polishchuk	self-promotion	642	2.15 %
26	20.14%	Kirill Shchitov	United Russia	10553	38.86 %
26	20.14%	Vladimir Kalinin	A Just Russia *¤	7087	26.09 %
26	20.14%	Andrei Ispolatov	Communist Party	3709	13.66 %
26	20.14%	Svetlana Anisimova	Communists of Russia	3243	11.94 %
26	20.14%	Ilya Axenov	LDPR	2567	9.45 %
27	21.64%	Stepan Orlov	United Russia	12943	42.82 %
27	21.64%	Alexei Dryga	Communist Party *	11044	36.53 %
27	21.64%	Sergei Korovin	LDPR	2285	7.56 %
27	21.64%	Sergei Erokhov	A Just Russia	1999	6.61 %
27	21.64%	Victor Gogolev	Communists of Russia	1959	6.48 %
28	20.75%	Elena Samyshina	United Russia	11570	40.37 %
28	20.75%	Arkady Pavlinov	A Just Russia *	7716	26.93 %
28	20.75%	Konstantin Lazarev	Communist Party	6992	24.40 %
28	20.75%	Sergei Eliseev	LDPR	2377	8.30 %
29	18.88%	Oleg Artemiev	United Russia	11560	43.30 %
29	18.88%	Nikolai Sergeev	Communist Party *	9288	34.79 %
29	18.88%	Boris Chernyshov	LDPR	3510	13.15 %
29	18.88%	Sergei Zhuravsky	A Just Russia	2337	8.76 %
30	21.74%	Margarita Rusetskaya	United Russia	9645	29.46 %
30	21.74%	Roman Yuneman	self-promotion¤	9561	29.20 %
30	21.74%	Vladislav Zhukovsky	Communist Party *	8346	25.50 %
30	21.74%	Pyotr Vikulin	Communists of Russia	2641	8.07 %
30	21.74%	Ilya Galibin	LDPR	1387	4.24 %
30	21.74%	Alexei Tsyba	A Just Russia	1156	3.53 %
31	20.57%	Lubov Nikitina	Communist Party*	13173	45.87 %
31	20.57%	Sergei Zverev	United Russia	8774	30.55 %
31	20.57%	Andrei Mileshin	Communists of Russia	2669	9.29 %
31	20.57%	Yulia Zhandarova	A Just Russia	2349	8.18 %
31	20.57%	Yulia Shmantsar	LDPR	1755	6.11 %
32	22.82%	Olga Melnikova	United Russia	12119	37.87 %
32	22.82%	Klim Likhachev	Communist Party *	11679	36.50 %
32	22.82%	Vladimir Bernev	LDPR	2192	6.85 %
32	22.82%	Vladimir Zalishchak	A Just Russia	2192	6.85 %
32	22.82%	Sergei Padalka	The Greens	2155	6.73 %
32	22.82%	Denis Kulikov	Communists of Russia	1665	5.20 %
33	19.11%	Lyudmila Guseva	United Russia	14401	42.20 %
33	19.11%	Levin Smirnov	Communist Party *	11284	33.07 %
33	19.11%	Vladimir Grinchenko	LDPR	3127	9.16 %
33	19.11%	Pavel Fedorov	Communists of Russia	2731	8.00 %
33	19.11%	Victor Prisnyak	Rodina	1451	4.25 %
33	19.11%	Garegin Papyan	A Just Russia	1132	3.32 %
34	20.06%	Alexander Semennikov	United Russia	11888	37.70 %
34	20.06%	Yulia Gladkova	Communist Party *	11314	35.87 %
34	20.06%	Maxim Chirkov	A Just Russia	4157	13.18 %
34	20.06%	Anton Yurikov	LDPR	2106	6.68 %
34	20.06%	Alexander Filatov	Communists of Russia	2071	6.57 %
35	21.69%	Natalia Metlina	United Russia	13285	36.28 %
35	21.69%	Sergei Vasiliev	A Just Russia *	10754	29.37 %
35	21.69%	Dmitry Agranovsky	Communist Party	4485	12.25 %
35	21.69%	Vladimir Ryazanov	Communists of Russia	3021	8.25 %
35	21.69%	Sergei Malakhov	self-promotion	2866	7.83 %
35	21.69%	Mikhail Monakhov	LDPR	2204	6.02 %
36	21.26%	Olga Sharapova	United Russia	10871	36.39 %
36	21.26%	Sergei Kurgansky	Communist Party *	10845	36.31 %
36	21.26%	Dmitry Repnikov	LDPR	3618	12.11 %
36	21.26%	Olesia Ryabtseva	A Just Russia	2141	7.17 %
36	21.26%	Alexei Pokataev	Communists of Russia	1308	4.38 %
36	21.26%	Artem Papeta	self-promotion	1084	3.63 %
37	20.69%	Nikolai Gubenko	Communist Party *	20621	61.65 %
37	20.69%	Yury Maximov	LDPR	6751	20.18 %
37	20.69%	Alexander Romanovich	A Just Russia	6076	18.17 %
38	24.25%	Alexander Kozlov	United Russia	22021	37.75 %
38	24.25%	Igor Glek	A Just Russia *¤	15437	26.46 %
38	24.25%	Lyudmila Eremina	Communist Party	9175	15.73 %
38	24.25%	Stanislav Smirnov	LDPR	6523	11.18 %
38	24.25%	Natalia Andrusenko	Communists of Russia	5179	8.88 %
39	23.04%	Valery Golovchenko	United Russia	14992	37.42 %
39	23.04%	Alexander Vidmanov	Communist Party *	11945	29.81 %
39	23.04%	Andrei Bezryadov	A Just Russia	4483	11.19 %
39	23.04%	Alexander Mityaev	LDPR	4374	10.91 %
39	23.04%	Nikolai Bestaev	Communists of Russia	4274	10.67 %
40	19.52%	Tatiana Batysheva	United Russia	13280	38.65 %
40	19.52%	Igor Sukhanov	Communist Party *	11718	34.11 %
40	19.52%	Alexander Mikhaylovsky	A Just Russia	3585	10.43 %
40	19.52%	Sergei Geraskin	LDPR	2601	7.57 %
40	19.52%	Sergei Moroz	Communists of Russia	1866	5.43 %
40	19.52%	Sergei Matveev	Rodina	1308	3.81 %
41	18.74%	Evgeny Gerasimov	United Russia	12602	42.67 %
41	18.74%	Olga Frolova	Communist Party *	10546	35.71 %
41	18.74%	Alexei Sobolev	self-promotion	2228	7.54 %
41	18.74%	German Bogatyrenko	LDPR	2154	7.30 %
41	18.74%	Ekaterina Pavlova	Communists of Russia	2002	6.78 %
42	20.83%	Ekaterina Engalycheva	Communist Party *	14298	44.06 %
42	20.83%	Kirill Nikitin	United Russia	6948	21.41 %
42	20.83%	Pavel Ramensky	LDPR	3179	9.80 %
42	20.83%	Boris Kagarlitsky	A Just Russia	2974	9.16 %
42	20.83%	Mikhail Menshikov	self-promotion	2936	9.05 %
42	20.83%	Olga Korshunova	Communists of Russia	1203	3.70 %
42	20.83%	Marina Kostycheva	Rodina	916	2.82 %
43	24.91%	Sergei Mitrokhin	Yabloko *¤	16120	46.28 %
43	24.91%	Dmitry Koshlakov-Krestovsky	LDPR	7231	20.76 %
43	24.91%	Roman Klimentiev	Communist Party	6529	18.74 %
43	24.91%	Evgeny Borovik	A Just Russia	4952	14.22 %
44	23.64%	Elena Shuvalova	Communist Party *	16710	46.47 %
44	23.64%	Ilya Sviridov	A Just Russia (supported by United Russia)	15738	43.77 %
44	23.64%	Nadezhda Shalimova	self-promotion	1793	4.99 %
44	23.64%	Ekaterina Nechaeva	LDPR	1714	4.77 %
45	22.93%	Magomet Yandiev	A Just Russia *	12942	41.16 %
45	22.93%	Valeria Kasamara	United Russia	11014	35.03 %
45	22.93%	Evgeny Turushev	LDPR	4124	13.11 %
45	22.93%	Mikhail Konev	self-promotion	3365	10.70 %

2019 Moscow City Duma electronic voting results
Const.	turnout	name	party	result	
Const.	turnout	name	party	votes	%
1		Andrei Titov	United Russia	1923	52.92 %
1		Ivan Ulyanchenko	Communist Party *	1058	29.11 %
1		Svetlana Nikituskina	A Just Russia	247	6.8 %
1		Vyacheslav Milovanov	LDPR	218	6.0 %
1		Olga Zhagina	Communists of Russia	218	5.17 %
10		Larisa Kartavtseva	United Russia	2124	55.91%
10		Yury Dashkov	Communist Party *	776	20.43 %
10		Andrei Suvorov	A Just Russia	368	9.67 %
10		Alexei Kryukov	LDPR	299	7.87 %
10		Igor Dashkevich	Communists of Russia	232	6.11 %
30		Margarita Rusetskaya	United Russia	1120	47.12 %
30		Vladislav Zhukovsky	Communist Party *	465	19.56 %
30		Roman Yuneman	self-promotion¤	455	19.14 %
30		Pyotr Vikulin	Communists of Russia	174	7.32 %
30		Ilya Galibin	LDPR	85	3.58 %
30		Alexei Tsyba	A Just Russia	78	3.28 %

== See also ==
- 2013 Moscow mayoral election
- 2019 Moscow protests
- 2019 Russian regional elections
- Anti-Corruption Foundation
- By-elections to the 7th Moscow City Duma
- Opposition to Vladimir Putin in Russia
