= Moscow City Duma District 10 =

Moscow City Duma electoral constituency

- Moscow City Duma constituency
- Deputy: Nikolay Zubrilin; Communist Party
- Administrative Okrug: North-Eastern
- Districts: Altufyevsky, Marfino, Otradnoye
- Voters: 181,073 (2024)

Moscow City Duma District 10 is one of 45 constituencies in Moscow City Duma. Currently the district covers parts of North-Eastern Moscow.

The district has been represented since 2024 by Communist Party faction leader Nikolay Zubrilin, a three-term member, who was redistricted from District 11 and won a competitive election against Marfino head Zinaida Avdoshkina (United Russia).

== Boundaries ==
District boundaries from 2014 to 2024

1993–1997: Alekseyevsky, Maryina Roshcha, Ostankinsky, Rostokino, Yaroslavsky
The district covered inner parts of North-Eastern Moscow.

1997–2001: Alekseyevsky, Maryina Roshcha, Ostankinsky, Rostokino, Yaroslavsky, TEOS Sheremetyevsky
The district was unchanged with VDNKh being elevated to a separate administrative division status.

2001–2005: Alekseyevsky, Maryina Roshcha, Ostankinsky, Rostokino, Yaroslavsky, part of Sviblovo, TEOS Sheremetyevsky (Note: merged into Ostankinsky District in 2002)
The district continued to cover inner parts of North-Eastern Moscow and gained part of Sviblovo from District 9.

2005–2009: Biryuleyovo Vostochnoye, Brateyevo, Moskvorechye-Saburovo, Orekhovo-Borisovo Severnoye, Orekhovo-Borisovo Yuzhnoye, Tsaritsyno, Zyablikovo
The district was completely reconfigured as it was placed into Southern Moscow, overlapping the then-eliminated State Duma Orekhovo-Borisovo constituency.

2009–2014: Chertanovo Severnoye, Danilovsky, Donskoy, Moskvorechye-Saburovo, Nagatino-Sadovniki, Nagatinsky Zaton, Nagorny, Tsaritsyno
The district was rearranged prior to the 2009 election, after the number of constituencies was increased from 15 to 17. The district was still based in Southern Moscow but retained only Moskvorechye-Saburovo and Tsaritsyno, gaining more territories to the north which were previously a part of District 8.

2014–2024: Bibirevo, Lianozovo, Severny
The district was completely rearranged in the 2014 redistricting as it was moved to cover outer parts of North-Eastern Moscow.

2024–present: Altufyevsky, Marfino, Otradnoye
During the 2023–24 Moscow redistricting the former district was renumbered District 9. In its new configuration the district took the entirety of former District 11.

== Members elected ==
Election	Member	Party
1993	Ivan Novitsky	Choice of Russia
1997	Ivan Novitsky	Independent
2001	Ivan Novitsky	Union of Right Forces
2005	Stepan Orlov	United Russia
2009	Mikhail Antontsev	United Russia
2014	Larisa Kartavtseva	Independent
2019	Larisa Kartavtseva	Independent
2024	Nikolay Zubrilin	Communist Party

== Election results ==
=== 2001 ===
Summary of the 16 December 2001 Moscow City Duma election in District 10
Candidate	Party	Votes	%
Ivan Novitsky (incumbent)	Union of Right Forces	27,818	44.44%
Valery Shaposhnikov	Independent	14,339	22.91%
Georgy Sitnikov	Communist Party	12,097	19.32%
against all		6,368	10.17%
Total		63,048	100%

=== 2005 ===
Summary of the 4 December 2005 Moscow City Duma election in District 10
Candidate	Party	Votes	%
Stepan Orlov (incumbent) (Note: redistricted from District 21)	United Russia	83,637	49.28%
Yevgeny Balashov (incumbent) (Note: redistricted from District 22)	Rodina	32,892	19.38%
Vladimir Mashkin	Communist Party	14,305	8.43%
Larisa Gorchakova	Social Democratic Party	14,189	8.36%
Viktor Osipovich	Liberal Democratic Party	8,326	4.91%
Yevgeny Ageyev	Independent	7,157	4.22%
Total		169,730	100%

=== 2009 ===
Summary of the 11 October 2009 Moscow City Duma election in District 10
Candidate	Party	Votes	%
Mikhail Antontsev (incumbent) (Note: redistricted from District 8)	United Russia	128,122	68.44%
Anatoly Zhigalov	Communist Party	22,022	11.76%
Vladimir Grankin	A Just Russia	14,918	7.97%
Oleg Guryev	Liberal Democratic Party	8,983	4.80%
Aleksey Shishov	Independent	6,939	3.71%
Total		187,199	100%

=== 2014 ===
Summary of the 14 September 2014 Moscow City Duma election in District 10
Candidate	Party	Votes	%
Larisa Kartavtseva	Independent	18,627	52.96%
Maksim Fadeyev	Communist Party	4,173	11.86%
Dmitry Kuznetsov	Liberal Democratic Party	3,731	10.61%
Aleksandr Sablukov	A Just Russia	3,544	10.08%
Inna Mertsalova	Yabloko	2,596	7.38%
Aleksey Kravtsov	Independent	1,242	3.53%
Total		35,174	100%

=== 2019 ===
Summary of the 8 September 2019 Moscow City Duma election in District 10
Candidate	Party	Votes	%
Larisa Kartavtseva (incumbent)	Independent	15,497	49.95%
Yury Dashkov	Communist Party	10,786	28.50%
Andrey Suvorov	A Just Russia	3,894	10.29%
Aleksey Kryukov	Liberal Democratic Party	3,761	9.94%
Igor Dashkevich	Communists of Russia	2,600	6.87%
Total		37,844	100%

=== 2024 ===
Summary of the 6–8 September 2024 Moscow City Duma election in District 10
Candidate	Party	Votes	%
Nikolay Zubrilin (incumbent) (Note: redistricted from District 11)	Communist Party	25,439	33.67%
Zinaida Avdoshkina	United Russia	20,533	27.18%
Aleksandra Vekshina	Liberal Democratic Party	15,228	20.15%
Ildar Kharipov	New People	8,002	10.59%
Gordey Armensky	A Just Russia – For Truth	6,330	8.38%
Total		75,558	100%
