= Moscow City Duma District 5 =

Moscow City Duma electoral constituency

- Moscow City Duma constituency
- Deputy: Milena Avimskaya; United Russia
- Administrative Okrug: Northern
- Districts: Golovinsky, Khovrino, Levoberezhny, part of Zapadnoye Degunino
- Voters: 187,054 (2024)

Moscow City Duma District 5 is one of 45 constituencies in Moscow City Duma. Currently the district covers outer parts of Northern Moscow.

The district has been represented since 2024 by United Russia deputy Milena Avimskaya, a Russian Army Theatre director, who succeeded retiring four-term Yabloko incumbent Yevgeny Bunimovich, redistricted there from District 6.

== Boundaries ==
District boundaries from 2014 to 2024

1993–2005: Beskudnikovsky, Dmitrovsky, Vostochnoye Degunino, Zapadnoye Degunino
The district covered outer parts of Northern Moscow.

2005–2009: Alekseyevsky, Babushkinsky, Butyrsky, Losinoostrovsky, Marfino, Maryina Roshcha, Ostankinsky, Rostokino, part of Sokolniki, Sviblovo, Yaroslavsky
The district was completely reconfigured as it was placed into Eastern and North-Eastern Moscow, overlapping the then-eliminated State Duma Babushkinsky constituency.

2009–2014: Alekseyevsky, Babushkinsky, Butyrsky, Losinoostrovsky, Marfino, Maryina Roshcha, Ostankinsky, Rostokino, Sokolniki, Sviblovo, Yaroslavsky
The district was lightly rearranged prior to the 2009 election, gaining the rest of Sokolniki from District 6.

2014–2024: Filyovsky Park, Khoroshyovo-Mnyovniki, part of Shchukino
The district was completely rearranged in the 2014 redistricting as it was moved to cover inner parts of North-Western and Western Moscow.

2024–present: Golovinsky, Khovrino, Levoberezhny, part of Zapadnoye Degunino
During the 2023–24 Moscow redistricting the old constituency was virtually eliminated as its parts were divided between new districts 4 (Shchukino), 42 (Filyovsky Park) and 43 (Khoroshyovo-Mnyovniki). In its new configuration the district took all of former District 6.

== Members elected ==
Election	Member	Party
1993	Sergey Osadchy (Note: elected to State Duma in December 2003)	Independent
1997	Sergey Osadchy	For Justice
2001	Sergey Osadchy	Independent
2004	Viktor Ivanov	United Russia
2005	Tatyana Portnova	United Russia
2009	Tatyana Portnova	United Russia
2014	Oleg Soroka	United Russia
2019	Roman Babayan	Independent
2024	Milena Avimskaya	United Russia

== Election results ==
=== 2001 ===
Summary of the 16 December 2001 Moscow City Duma election in District 5
Candidate	Party	Votes	%
Sergey Osadchy (incumbent)	Independent	39,765	63.07%
Pyotr Zvyagintsev	Independent	8,031	12.74%
Sergey Degtyarev	Independent	4,011	6.36%
Andrey Kobozev	Independent	1,104	1.75%
against all		7,181	11.39%
Total		63,755	100%

=== 2004 ===
Summary of the 14 March 2004 Moscow City Duma by-election in District 5
Candidate	Party	Votes	%
Viktor Ivanov	United Russia	48,764	42.06%
Lyudmila Lipina	Liberal Democratic Party	17,511	15.10%
Yelena Guseva	Independent	14,742	12.71%
against all		30,727	26.50%
Total		115,950	100%

=== 2005 ===
Summary of the 4 December 2005 Moscow City Duma election in District 5
Candidate	Party	Votes	%
Tatyana Portnova (incumbent) (Note: redistricted from District 9)	United Russia	62,851	43.52%
Ivan Novitsky (incumbent) (Note: redistricted from District 10)	Yabloko-United Democrats	25,621	17.74%
Vadim Solyanikov	Rodina	21,646	14.99%
Vadim Solovyov	Communist Party	16,734	11.59%
Aleksandr Ivanov	Liberal Democratic Party	5,794	4.01%
Sergey Lebedev	Independent	4,642	3.21%
Total		144,414	100%

=== 2009 ===
Summary of the 11 October 2009 Moscow City Duma election in District 5
Candidate	Party	Votes	%
Tatyana Portnova (incumbent)	United Russia	70,733	55.72%
Vladimir Lakeyev	Communist Party	20,986	16.53%
Sergey Cherepanov	A Just Russia	14,357	11.31%
Aleksandr Ivanov	Liberal Democratic Party	9,308	7.33%
Sergey Lebedev	Independent	5,343	4.21%
Total		126,936	100%

=== 2014 ===
Summary of the 14 September 2014 Moscow City Duma election in District 5
Candidate	Party	Votes	%
Oleg Soroka	United Russia	12,196	32.55%
Sergey Baburin	Communist Party	9,128	24.36%
Maksim Katz	Independent	8,613	22.99%
Yelena Morozova	Yabloko	4,066	10.85%
Vitaly Zolochevsky	Liberal Democratic Party	2,260	6.03%
Total		37,468	100%

=== 2019 ===
Summary of the 8 September 2019 Moscow City Duma election in District 5
Candidate	Party	Votes	%
Roman Babayan	Independent	18,524	47.17%
Anastasia Udaltsova	Communist Party	15,598	39.72%
Ksenia Domozhirova	A Just Russia	2,196	5.59%
Aleksey Litvinov	Liberal Democratic Party	1,685	4.29%
Total		39,269	100%

=== 2024 ===
Summary of the 6–8 September 2024 Moscow City Duma election in District 5
Candidate	Party	Votes	%
Milena Avimskaya	United Russia	31,936	44.19%
Aleksandra Bespalova	Communist Party	12,584	17.41%
Pavel Korytnikov	New People	8,923	12.35%
Dmitry Golubyatnikov	Liberal Democratic Party	8,496	11.76%
Mikhail Androsov	A Just Russia – For Truth	5,569	7.71%
Ivan Kurbakov	Communists of Russia	4,729	6.54%
Total		72,264	100%
