= Moscow City Duma District 13 =

Moscow City Duma electoral constituency

- Moscow City Duma constituency
- Deputy: Aleksandr Sapronov; United Russia
- Administrative Okrug: North-Eastern
- Districts: Alekseyevsky, Butyrsky, Maryina Roshcha, Ostankinsky, Rostokino
- Voters: 181,465 (2024)

Moscow City Duma District 13 is one of 45 constituencies in Moscow City Duma. Currently the district covers inner parts of North-Eastern Moscow.

The district has been represented since 2024 by United Russia deputy Aleksandr Sapronov, a park director and former Severnoye Medvedkovo District head, who succeeded Yabloko faction leader and one-term incumbent Maksim Kruglov after Kruglov failed to qualify for re-election by collecting signatures.

== Boundaries ==
District boundaries from 2014 to 2024

1993–2001: Golyanovo, Severnoye Izmaylovo, Vostochny
The district covered outer parts of Eastern Moscow.

2001–2005: Golyanovo, part of Izmaylovo, Severnoye Izmaylovo, Vostochny
The district continued to cover parts of Eastern Moscow and gained part of Izmaylovo from District 14.

2005–2009: Gagarinsky, Lomonosovsky, Novo-Peredelkino, Obruchevsky, Prospekt Vernadskogo, Ramenki, Solntsevo, Troparyovo-Nikulino, Vnukovo
The district was completely reconfigured as it was placed into Western and South-Western Moscow, overlapping the then-eliminated State Duma Universitetsky constituency.

2009–2014: Konkovo, Kotlovka, Tyoply Stan, Yasenevo, Zyuzino
The district was rearranged prior to the 2009 election, after the number of constituencies was increased from 15 to 17. The district was based in South-Western Moscow, which was previously divided between districts 11 and 12.

2014–2024: Babushkinsky, Losinoostrovsky, Yaroslavsky
The district was completely rearranged in the 2014 redistricting as it was moved to cover outer parts of North-Eastern Moscow.

2024–present: Alekseyevsky, Butyrsky, Maryina Roshcha, Ostankinsky, Rostokino
During the 2023–24 Moscow redistricting the former district was renumbered District 12. In its new configuration the district took the entirety of former District 14.

== Members elected ==
Election	Member	Party
1993	Vitaly Kovalevsky	Choice of Russia
1997	Vitaly Kovalevsky	Independent
2001	Vitaly Kovalevsky	Independent
2005	Vladimir Platonov	United Russia
2009	Anton Paleyev	United Russia
2014	Tatyana Portnova	United Russia
2019	Igor Buskin	Independent
2024	Aleksandr Sapronov	United Russia

== Election results ==
=== 2001 ===
Summary of the 16 December 2001 Moscow City Duma election in District 13
Candidate	Party	Votes	%
Vitaly Kovalevsky (incumbent)	Independent	14,048	29.45%
Pyotr Pokrevsky	Union of Right Forces	8,959	18.78%
Yury Polyanin	Independent	6,046	12.68%
Vladimir Ivanov	Liberal Democratic Party	4,730	9.92%
Nikolay Bukhovets	Independent	3,606	7.56%
Sergey Kolotnev	Independent	2,347	4.92%
against all		6,451	13.53%
Total		48,164	100%

=== 2005 ===
Summary of the 4 December 2005 Moscow City Duma election in District 13
Candidate	Party	Votes	%
Vladimir Platonov (incumbent) (Note: redistricted from District 29)	United Russia	58,185	37.83%
Nikolay Gubenko	Communist Party	42,967	27.94%
Ilya Yashin	Yabloko-United Democrats	21,801	14.17%
Aleksey Gladkov	Russian Party of Life	7,182	4.67%
Aleksandr Kobrinsky	Liberal Democratic Party	6,040	3.93%
Svetlana Potapova	Social Democratic Party	4,688	3.05%
Mikhail Lipsky	Agrarian Party	1,956	1.27%
Vladimir Goldenberg	Independent	1,784	1.16%
Total		153,803	100%

=== 2009 ===
Summary of the 11 October 2009 Moscow City Duma election in District 13
Candidate	Party	Votes	%
Anton Paleyev	United Russia	66,658	58.18%
Sergey Mitropolsky	Communist Party	23,561	20.56%
Yevgeny Romanov	Independent	10,477	9.14%
Vladimir Lyagushin	Liberal Democratic Party	8,766	7.65%
Total		114,572	100%

=== 2014 ===
Summary of the 14 September 2014 Moscow City Duma election in District 13
Candidate	Party	Votes	%
Tatyana Portnova (incumbent) (Note: redistricted from District 5)	United Russia	15,354	45.02%
Svetlana Savitskaya	Yabloko	4,932	14.46%
Nikolay Morozov	A Just Russia	4,517	13.25%
Rodion Shaizhanov	Communist Party	4,425	12.98%
Sergey Dobrynin	Liberal Democratic Party	2,442	7.16%
Sergey Lebedev	Independent	1,323	3.88%
Total		34,103	100%

=== 2019 ===
Summary of the 8 September 2019 Moscow City Duma election in District 13
Candidate	Party	Votes	%
Igor Buskin	Independent	11,240	31.89%
Ilya Lifantsev	A Just Russia	9,028	25.61%
Aleksandr Potapov	Communist Party	8,924	25.32%
Tatyana Kravchenko	Liberal Democratic Party	3,263	9.26%
Denis Zommer	Communists of Russia	1,573	4.46%
Total		35,246	100%

=== 2024 ===
Summary of the 6–8 September 2024 Moscow City Duma election in District 13
Candidate	Party	Votes	%
Aleksandr Sapronov	United Russia	31,925	47.64%
Ita Cherkesova	Communist Party	8,201	12.24%
Yevgeny Obrezkov	Liberal Democratic Party	6,587	9.83%
Aleksey Balin	New People	6,457	9.64%
Mikhail Kislitsky	A Just Russia – For Truth	5,232	7.81%
Yulia Kharchenko	Independent	4,415	6.59%
Ruslan Sharypin	Independent	2,270	3.39%
Aleksandr Babak	Independent	1,873	2.80%
Total		67,010	100%
