= Moscow City Duma District 9 =

Moscow City Duma electoral constituency

- Moscow City Duma constituency
- Deputy: Larisa Kartavtseva; United Russia
- Administrative Okrug: North-Eastern
- Districts: Bibirevo, Lianozovo, Severny
- Voters: 188,386 (2024)

Moscow City Duma District 9 is one of 45 constituencies in Moscow City Duma. Currently the district covers outer parts of North-Eastern Moscow.

The district has been represented since 2024 by United Russia deputy Larisa Kartavtseva, (Note: member of My Moscow faction in 2014–2019) a doctor and three-term member, who was redistricted from District 10.

== Boundaries ==
District boundaries from 2014 to 2024

1993–2001: Babushkinsky, Losinoostrovsky, Severnoye Medvedkovo, Sviblovo
The district covered outer parts of North-Eastern Moscow.

2001–2005: Babushkinsky, Losinoostrovsky, Severnoye Medvedkovo, part of Sviblovo
The district continued to cover outer parts of North-Eastern Moscow but lost part of Sviblovo to District 10.

2005–2009: Kapotnya, Kuzminki, Lyublino, Maryino, Nekrasovka, Vykhino-Zhulebino
The district was completely reconfigured as it was placed into South-Eastern Moscow, overlapping the then-eliminated State Duma Lyublino constituency.

2009–2014: Kapotnya, Lyublino, Maryino, Vykhino-Zhulebino
The district was rearranged prior to the 2009 election, after the number of constituencies was increased from 15 to 17. The district retained much of its former territory, only losing Kuzminki and Nekrasovka to District 8.

2014–2024: Begovoy, part of Beskudnikovsky, Khoroshyovsky, Savyolovsky, Timiryazevsky
The district was completely rearranged in the 2014 redistricting as it was moved to cover inner parts of Northern Moscow.

2024–present: Bibirevo, Lianozovo, Severny
During the 2023–24 Moscow redistricting most of the former district was renumbered District 8, except for a part of Khoroshyovsky District, which was placed into District 7. In its new configuration the district took the entirety of former District 10.

== Members elected ==
Election	Member	Party
1993	Yevgeny Zaikin	Independent
1997	Yury Sharandin (Note: appointed to the Federation Council from Evenk Autonomous Okrug in June 2001)	Independent
2001	Tatyana Portnova	Independent
2005	Sergey Turta	United Russia
2009	Sergey Turta	United Russia
2014	Irina Ilyicheva	United Russia
2019	Andrey Medvedev	Independent
2024	Larisa Kartavtseva	United Russia

== Election results ==
=== 2001 ===
Summary of the 16 December 2001 Moscow City Duma election in District 9
Candidate	Party	Votes	%
Tatyana Portnova	Independent	23,283	38.93%
Sergey Medvedev	Independent	12,556	20.99%
Ilya Sofronov	Communist Party	5,390	9.01%
irina Zasedateleva	Independent	5,013	8.38%
Lyubov Adamskaya	Independent	3,902	6.52%
Sergey Lebedev	Independent	1,334	2.23%
against all		6,605	11.04%
Total		60,640	100%

=== 2005 ===
Summary of the 4 December 2005 Moscow City Duma election in District 9
Candidate	Party	Votes	%
Sergey Turta (incumbent) (Note: redistricted from District 19)	United Russia	98,489	57.61%
Valery Smirnov	Rodina	21,389	12.51%
Aleksandr Kulikov	Communist Party	19,393	11.34%
Yelena Kiriyenko	Independent	14,015	8.20%
Maksim Tretyukhin	Liberal Democratic Party	8,839	5.17%
Total		170,949	100%

=== 2009 ===
Summary of the 11 October 2009 Moscow City Duma election in District 9
Candidate	Party	Votes	%
Sergey Turta (incumbent)	United Russia	140,559	75.80%
Sergey Shishkin	A Just Russia	24,912	13.44%
Aleksandr Shishkin	Liberal Democratic Party	14,037	7.57%
Total		185,423	100%

=== 2014 ===
Summary of the 14 September 2014 Moscow City Duma election in District 9
Candidate	Party	Votes	%
Irina Ilyicheva	United Russia	12,961	34.41%
Yulia Galyamina	Yabloko	6,845	18.18%
Sergey Sidorov	Communist Party	6,543	17.37%
Alyona Popova	Independent	3,385	8.99%
Maya Galenkina	Liberal Democratic Party	1,764	4.68%
Aleksey Gusenkov	The Greens	1,743	4.63%
Vitaly Ponomaryov	Independent	1,699	4.51%
Olga Kuznetsova	A Just Russia	1,532	4.07%
Total		37,661	100%

=== 2019 ===
Summary of the 8 September 2019 Moscow City Duma election in District 9
Candidate	Party	Votes	%
Andrey Medvedev	Independent	15,580	40.02%
Nikolay Stepanov	Communist Party	15,067	38.70%
Yekaterina Bakasheva	Communists of Russia	2,451	6.30%
Maya Galenkina	Liberal Democratic Party	2,399	6.16%
Alisa Goluyenko	A Just Russia	1,928	4.95%
Total		38,933	100%

=== 2024 ===
Summary of the 6–8 September 2024 Moscow City Duma election in District 9
Candidate	Party	Votes	%
Larisa Kartavtseva (incumbent) (Note: redistricted from District 10)	United Russia	40,768	50.03%
Ivan Ivchenko	Liberal Democratic Party	11,065	13.58%
Andrey Dutov	Communist Party	8,765	10.76%
Andrey Topal	Independent	6,794	8.34%
Dmitry Porokhov	A Just Russia – For Truth	5,955	7.31%
Igor Laskeyev	New People	5,290	6.49%
Nikolay Durnev	Independent	2,794	3.43%
Total		81,487	100%
