= Medvedkovo constituency =

Russian legislative constituency

Medvedkovo single-member constituency
- Constituency of the Russian State Duma

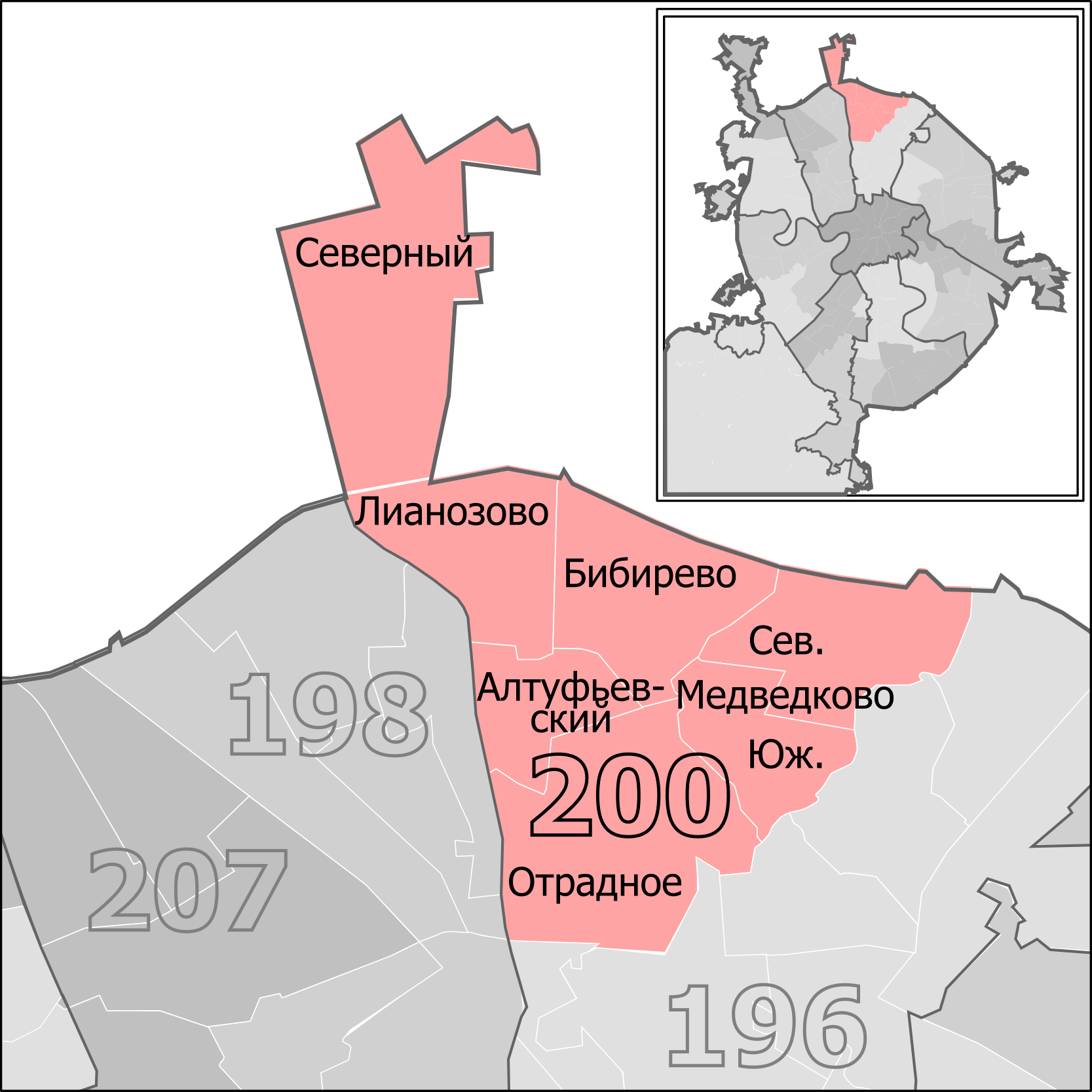
- Constituency boundaries since 2016
- Deputy: Aleksandr Shelkovoy; United Russia
- Federal subject: Moscow
- Districts: North-Eastern AO (Altufyevsky, Bibirevo, Lianozovo, Otradnoye, Severnoye Medvedkovo, Severny, Yuzhnoye Medvedkovo)
- Voters: 477,652 (2026)

The Medvedkovo constituency (No.199 (Note: No.195 in 1993-1995, No.196 in 1995-2007, No.200 in 2016–2026)) is a Russian legislative constituency in Moscow. The constituency covers outer North-Eastern Moscow.

The constituency has been represented since 2026 by United Russia deputy Aleksandr Shelkovoy, retired Russian Army sergeant and engineer, who won the open seat, succeeding one-term New People incumbent Dmitry Pevtsov.

== Boundaries ==
1993–1995: North-Eastern Administrative Okrug (Altufyevsky District, Bibirevo District, Butyrsky District, Lianozovo District, Marfino District, Otradnoye District, Severny District, Yuzhnoye Medvedkovo District)
The constituency covered western part of North-Eastern Moscow.

1995–2007, 2016–present: North-Eastern Administrative Okrug (Altufyevsky District, Bibirevo District, Lianozovo District, Otradnoye District, Severnoye Medvedkovo District, Severny District, Yuzhnoye Medvedkovo District)
After the 1995 redistricting the constituency was slightly changed, swapping Butyrsky District and Marfino District for Severnoye Medvedkovo District with Babushkinsky constituency. This seat did not exist between 2007 and 2016 as State Duma was elected only through proportional representation.

== Members elected ==
Election	Member	Party
1993	Viktor Mironov	Independent
1995	Georgy Boos (Note: in 1998 appointed as Head of State Taxation Service)	Independent
1999	Georgy Boos (Note: in 2005 appointed as Governor of Kaliningrad Oblast)	Fatherland – All Russia
2003	Georgy Boos	United Russia
2006	Leonid Govorov	United Russia
2007	Proportional representation - no election by constituency	
2011	Proportional representation - no election by constituency	
2016	Denis Parfenov	Communist Party
2021	Dmitry Pevtsov	Independent
2026	Aleksandr Shelkovoy	United Russia

== Election results ==
=== 1993 ===
Summary of the 12 December 1993 Russian legislative election in the Medvedkovo constituency
Candidate	Party	Votes	%
Viktor Mironov	Independent	42,616	19.14%
Yevgeny Kozhokin	Independent	–	14.93%
Garegin Agasaryan	Independent	–	–
Andrey Babushkin	Independent	–	–
Aleksandr Ivanov	Agrarian Party	–	–
Mikhail Kolotkov	Independent	–	–
Yury Leonov	Communist Party	–	–
Anatoly Sliva	Party of Russian Unity and Accord	–	–
Vladimir Smetanin	Yavlinsky–Boldyrev–Lukin	–	–
Total		222,598	100%

=== 1995 ===
Summary of the 17 December 1995 Russian legislative election in the Medvedkovo constituency
Candidate	Party	Votes	%
Georgy Boos	Independent	57,687	20.86%
Viktor Mironov (incumbent)	Independent	39,086	14.13%
Konstantin Zhukov	Communist Party	33,192	12.00%
Vladimir Novikov	Independent	19,378	7.01%
Igor Toporovsky	Independent	16,158	5.84%
Vitaly Skutsky	Independent	10,881	3.93%
Olga Litavrina	Education - Future of Russia	10,557	3.82%
Mikhail Larin	Independent	8,081	2.92%
Yelena Grigoryeva	Independent	6,496	2.35%
Sergey Komkov	Independent	6,159	2.23%
Vladimir Ulas	Independent	6,120	2.21%
Mikhail Varfolomeyev	Liberal Democratic Party	5,662	2.05%
Sergey Slabun	Independent	3,943	1.43%
against all		47,863	17.30%
Total		276,603	100%

=== 1999 ===
Summary of the 19 December 1999 Russian legislative election in the Medvedkovo constituency
Candidate	Party	Votes	%
Georgy Boos	Fatherland – All Russia	165,789	56.15%
Konstantin Zhukov	Communist Party	25,245	8.55%
Aleksandr Chadov	Yabloko	16,325	5.53%
Mikhail Anichkin	Union of Right Forces	16,177	5.48%
Tatyana Sudets	Liberal Democratic Party	13,450	4.55%
Pyotr Svyatashov	Andrey Nikolayev and Svyatoslav Fyodorov Bloc	5,059	1.71%
Yury Lunkov	Spiritual Heritage	4,683	1.59%
Viktor Mironov	Independent	3,520	1.19%
Aleksandr Gorbenko	Independent	1,805	0.61%
against all		35,894	12.16%
Total		295,286	100%

=== 2003 ===
Summary of the 7 December 2003 Russian legislative election in the Medvedkovo constituency
Candidate	Party	Votes	%
Georgy Boos (incumbent)	United Russia	154,890	59.28%
Andrey Babushkin	Yabloko	23,744	9.09%
Aleksandr Mironov	Russian Communist Workers Party-Russian Party of Communists	19,337	7.40%
Valeriya Novodvorskaya	Independent	14,827	5.67%
Vilenina Golitsyna	Liberal Democratic Party	5,408	2.07%
Mikhail Kiptik	Independent	1,183	0.45%
against all		37,514	14.36%
Total		262,990	100%

=== 2006 ===
Summary of the 12 March 2006 by-election in the Medvedkovo constituency
Candidate	Party	Votes	%
Leonid Govorov	United Russia	92,924	72.90%
Dmitry Nikonov	Independent	9,211	7.22%
Igor Dyakov	Liberal Democratic Party	8,508	6.67%
against all		14,213	11.15%
Total		127,454	100%

=== 2016 ===
Summary of the 18 September 2016 Russian legislative election in the Medvedkovo constituency
Candidate	Party	Votes	%
Denis Parfenov	Communist Party	28,611	19.11%
Sergey Dobrynin	Liberal Democratic Party	23,842	15.93%
Andrey Babushkin	Yabloko	20,831	13.92%
Oleg Mitvol	The Greens	19,776	13.21%
Yulia Rublyova	A Just Russia	17,463	11.67%
Vyacheslav Blinov	Communists of Russia	8,327	5.56%
Dmitry Marinichev	Party of Growth	7,501	5.01%
Fyodor Trakhanov	Civilian Power	7,282	4.86%
Aleksey Zheravlyov	Patriots of Russia	5,280	3.53%
Kristina Grigorovich	Civic Platform	2,388	1.60%
Total		149,693	100%

=== 2021 ===
Summary of the 17-19 September 2021 Russian legislative election in the Medvedkovo constituency
Candidate	Party	Votes	%
Dmitry Pevtsov	Independent	84,593	38.23%
Denis Parfenov (incumbent)	Communist Party	58,042	26.23%
Yury Zagrebnoy	A Just Russia — For Truth	17,911	8.09%
Andrey Babushkin	Yabloko	12,389	5.60%
Yevgeny Stepkin	Liberal Democratic Party	10,774	4.87%
Yevgeny Zapotylok	New People	9,372	4.24%
Polina Anisimkova	The Greens	7,991	3.61%
Mikhail Velmakin	Green Alternative	5,451	2.46%
Mikhail Orlov	Communists of Russia	4,998	2.26%
Andrey Arbuzov	Civic Platform	2,674	1.21%
Total		240,912	100%

=== 2026 ===
Summary of the 18-20 September 2026 Russian legislative election in the Medvedkovo constituency
Candidate	Party	Votes	%
Aleksandr Shelkovoy	United Russia	104,459	41.27%
Polina Lermant	Yabloko	26,263	10.38%
Ilya Kiselev	Communist Party	25,567	10.10%
Igor Laskeyev	New People	25,057	9.90%
Vasily Rybakov	Liberal Democratic Party	22,869	9.04%
Aleksandr Latyntsev	A Just Russia	20,752	8.20%
Aleksandr Zimin	The Greens	12,056	4.76%
Aleksandr Kartashov	Communists of Russia	10,872	4.30%
Yelizaveta Polkanova	Party of Direct Democracy	4,340	1.71%
Total		253,096	100%
