= Moscow City Duma District 8 =

Moscow City Duma electoral constituency

- Moscow City Duma constituency
- Deputy: Andrey Medvedev; United Russia
- Administrative Okrug: Northern
- Districts: Begovoy, part of Beskudnikovsky, part of Khoroshyovsky, Savyolovsky, Timiryazevsky
- Voters: 188,844 (2024)

Moscow City Duma District 8 is one of 45 constituencies in Moscow City Duma. Currently the district covers parts of Northern Moscow.

The district has been represented since 2024 by United Russia deputy Andrey Medvedev, (Note: Independent deputy in 2019–2024) a journalist and two-term member, who was redistricted from District 9.

== Boundaries ==
District boundaries from 2014 to 2024

1993–2001: Altufyevsky, Bibirevo, Lianozovo, Severny
The district covered outer parts of North-Eastern Moscow.

2001–2005: Altufyevsky, Bibirevo, Lianozovo, part of Otradnoye, Severny
The district continued to cover outer parts of North-Eastern Moscow and gained part of Otradnoye from District 11.

2005–2009: Danilovsky, Donskoy, Lefortovo, Nagatino-Sadovniki, Nagatinsky Zaton, Nizhegorodsky, Pechatniki, Ryazansky, Tekstilshchiki, Yuzhnoportovy
The district was completely reconfigured as it was placed into Southern and South-Eastern Moscow, overlapping the then-eliminated State Duma Avtozavodsky constituency.

2009–2014: Kuzminki, Lefortovo, Nekrasovka, Nizhegorodsky, Pechatniki, Ryazansky, Tekstilshchiki, Yuzhnoportovy
The district was rearranged prior to the 2009 election, after the number of constituencies was increased from 15 to 17. The district retained much of its former territory in South-Eastern Moscow, losing its former part of Southern Moscow to District 10 and in exchange gaining Kuzminki and Nekrasovka from District 9.

2014–2024: Aeroport, Koptevo, Sokol, Voykovsky
The district was completely rearranged in the 2014 redistricting as it was moved to cover parts of Northern Moscow.

2024–present: Begovoy, part of Beskudnikovsky, part of Khoroshyovsky, Savyolovsky, Timiryazevsky
During the 2023–24 Moscow redistricting most of the former district was renumbered District 7. In its new configuration the district took almost all of former District 9, except for a small part of Khoroshyovsky District, which was placed into District 7.

== Members elected ==
Election	Member	Party
1993	Yury Sizov	Russian Democratic Reform Movement
1997	Vladimir Vasilyev (Note: elected to State Duma in December 2003)	Independent
2001	Vladimir Vasilyev	Independent
2004	Valery Shaposhnikov	United Russia
2005	Mikhail Antontsev	United Russia
2009	Lyudmila Stebenkova	United Russia
2014	Leonid Zyuganov	Communist Party
2019	Darya Besedina	Independent
2024	Andrey Medvedev	United Russia

== Election results ==
=== 2001 ===
Summary of the 16 December 2001 Moscow City Duma election in District 8
Candidate	Party	Votes	%
Vladimir Vasilyev (incumbent)	Independent	34,966	60.67%
Svetlana Kukushkina	Independent	8,397	14.57%
Anna Lisichkina	Independent	4,447	7.72%
against all		7,626	13.23%
Total		58,415	100%

=== 2004 ===
Summary of the 14 March 2004 Moscow City Duma by-election in District 8
Candidate	Party	Votes	%
Valery Shaposhnikov	United Russia	52,520	42.22%
Nikolay Zubrilin	Communist Party	13,081	10.51%
Aleksandr Chelishchev	Independent	9,692	7.79%
Anatoly Alekseyev	Liberal Democratic Party	5,766	4.63%
Gennady Belinsky	Independent	4,773	3.84%
against all		35,706	28.70%
Total		124,406	100%

=== 2005 ===
Summary of the 4 December 2005 Moscow City Duma election in District 8
Candidate	Party	Votes	%
Mikhail Antontsev (incumbent) (Note: redistricted from District 20)	United Russia	84,727	49.64%
Anatoly Zhigalov	Communist Party	25,353	14.85%
Vladislav Yashkin	Rodina	24,031	14.08%
Yury Kaminsky	Liberal Democratic Party	16,972	9.94%
Vladimir Popov	Independent	7,134	4.18%
Total		170,676	100%

=== 2009 ===
Summary of the 11 October 2009 Moscow City Duma election in District 8
Candidate	Party	Votes	%
Lyudmila Stebenkova	United Russia	91,919	68.69%
Anatoly Turenko	Communist Party	16,143	12.06%
Maksim Govorin	Liberal Democratic Party	10,243	7.65%
Aleksandr Kuvayev	A Just Russia	9,715	7.26%
Total		133,820	100%

=== 2014 ===
Summary of the 14 September 2014 Moscow City Duma election in District 8
Candidate	Party	Votes	%
Leonid Zyuganov	Communist Party	11,904	33.47%
Igor Nikolayev	Yabloko	7,196	20.23%
Anton Morozov	Independent	5,858	16.47%
Oleg Belyayev	A Just Russia	4,043	11.37%
Tatyana Fateyeva	Liberal Democratic Party	3,347	9.41%
Lilia Yunusova	Civilian Power	1,855	5.22%
Total		35,563	100%

=== 2019 ===
Summary of the 8 September 2019 Moscow City Duma election in District 8
Candidate	Party	Votes	%
Darya Besedina	Independent	14,911	36.57%
Vadim Kumin	Communist Party	12,805	31.41%
Olga Panina	A Just Russia	5,774	14.16%
Yekaterina Kopeykina	Independent	2,765	6.78%
Vasily Vlasov	Liberal Democratic Party	2,153	5.28%
Yelena Lugovskaya	Party of Growth	1,253	3.07%
Total		40,773	100%

=== 2024 ===
Summary of the 6–8 September 2024 Moscow City Duma election in District 8
Candidate	Party	Votes	%
Andrey Medvedev (incumbent) (Note: redistricted from District 9)	United Russia	37,599	55.38%
Anastasia Pavlyuchenkova	A Just Russia – For Truth	8,795	12.95%
Igor Arkhipov	New People	7,800	11.49%
Aleksandr Shprygin	Liberal Democratic Party	5,814	8.56%
Matvey Zotov	Communist Party	5,287	7.79%
Dmitry Bitkov	Communists of Russia	2,556	3.76%
Total		67,895	100%
