= Babushkin =

Babushkin (masculine) or Babushkina (feminine) may refer to:

- Babushkin (surname) (Babushkina), Russian surname
- Babushkin (town), a town in the Republic of Buryatia, Russia
- Babushkin, a former town in Moscow Oblast, Russian SFSR, Soviet Union; currently a part of Moscow known as Babushkinsky District, Moscow
- Babushkin Bay, a bay in the Sea of Okhotsk

== See also ==
- Babushka (disambiguation)
- Babushkinsky (disambiguation)
