= Marfino District =

- District
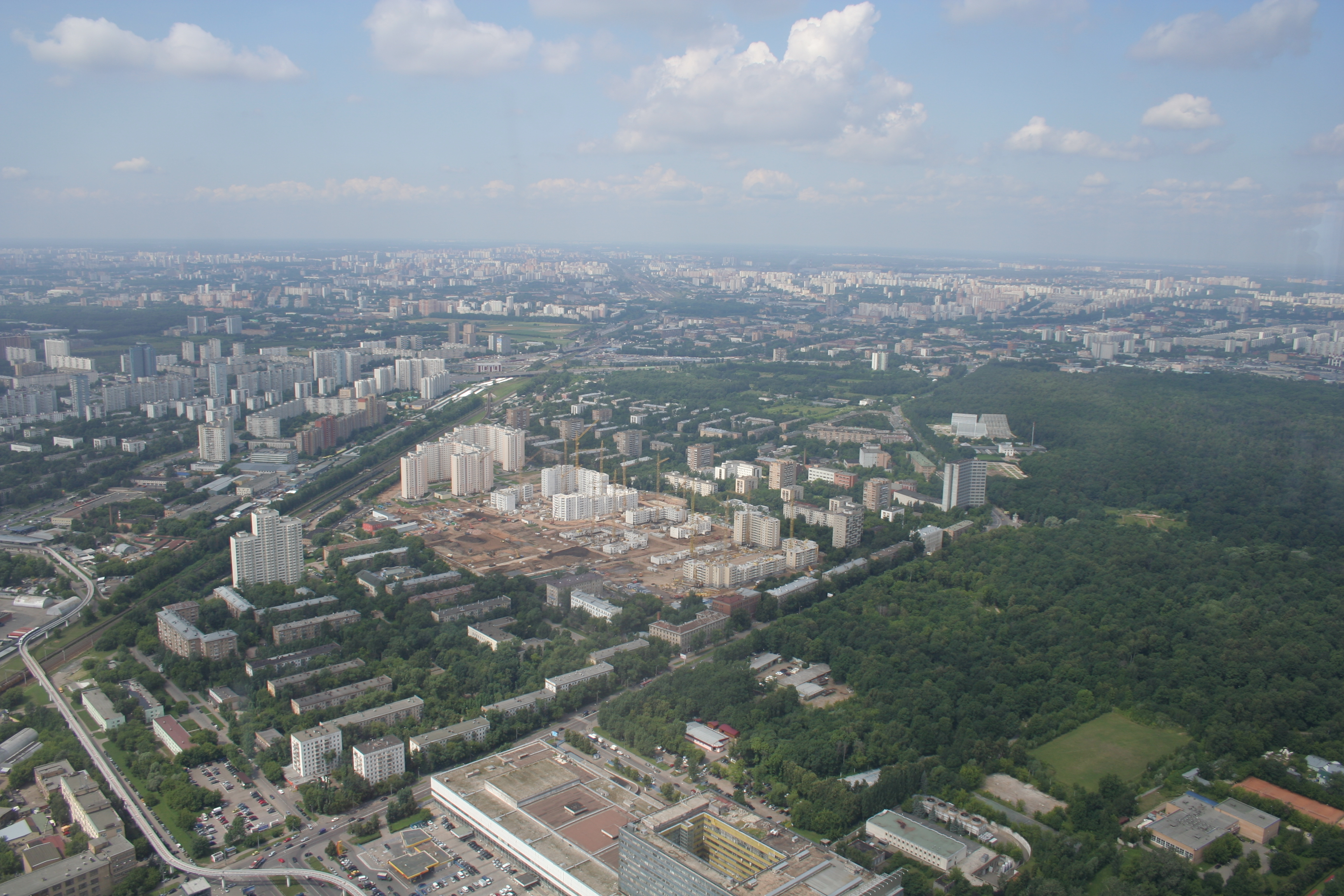
- Views from the observation deck of the Ostankino Tower, Marfino District

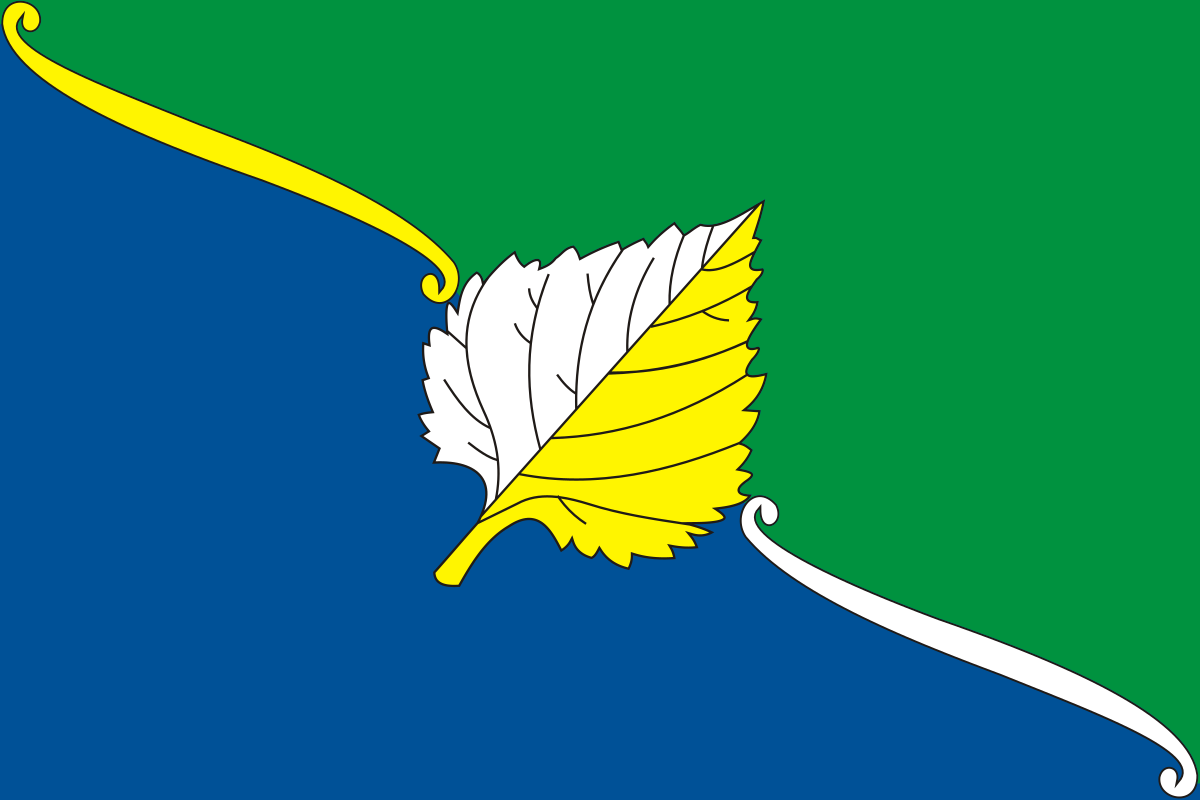
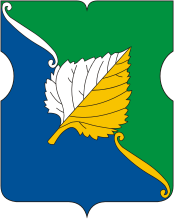
- Flag Coat of arms
- Location of Marfino District on the map of Moscow
- Coordinates: 55°49′49″N 37°35′34″E
- Country: Russia
- Federal subject: Moscow

Area
  - Total: 2.7 km^{2} (1.0 sq mi)

Population
  - Estimate (2017): 34,700
- Time zone: UTC+
- OKTMO ID: 45356000
- Website: http://marfino.mos.ru/

Marfino District (Russian: райо́н Марфино) is an administrative district (raion) of North-Eastern Administrative Okrug, and one of the 125 raions of Moscow, Russia. It is 8 km north of Moscow city center; to the east is Moscow's Central Botanical Gardens and the Ostankino Park. To the west is Butyrsky District. The area of the district is 2.7 square kilometers (1.0 sq mi). Population: 34,500 (2017 est.)

== History ==
Marfino was first mentioned in a land survey book of 1560 as a wasteland. As a village, Marfino was first mentioned in a charter issued by Tsar Mikhail Fyodorovich: on September 19, 1619, Marfino, along with the village of Vladykino, was granted to Dmitry Mikhailovich Pozharsky in perpetual hereditary ownership for his courage and loyalty to the throne during the invasion (Collection of State Charters and Treaties, 3, 312). However, in 1623, the village was returned to the possession of the Epiphany Monastery.

After a land exchange between Patriarch Nikon and the Epiphany Monastery in 1653, Marfino came under the ownership of the Patriarch.

In 1688, the Patriarch agreed to donate the village of Marfino to the monastic brethren. Following this, the monastery owned Marfino for a century. The monastery remained the owner of Marfino until 1764, when Catherine II confiscated the lands of all monasteries into the state treasury. Catherine's reform also affected the Epiphany Monastery, which lost most of its lands. According to the 1744 census, the village had a population of 32 souls. The fields covered 30 quarters of land. There were only 10 workers, who did not own any land due to its scarcity and instead received an annual salary from the monastery: 2 rubles each, 6 quarters of grain, and the monastery paid the poll tax (taxes for these workers) to the treasury. There were 20 haystacks of meadowland and 2 desyatins of arable and non-arable forest. Additionally, Marfino had 3 fishponds and a livestock farm.

From the second half of the 18th century, home-based textile production emerged in Marfino, actively employing the labor of young girls. Women and girls produced socks, stockings, and gloves, which were in decent demand in Moscow.

On a map from the early 19th century, Marfino is surrounded by fields. To the east lies the Sheremetev Park, which transitions into a forest to the north and into undergrowth to the west, stretching all the way to the road to Dmitrov. To the south of Marfino, fields extended as far as the Butyrskaya Sloboda. Part of the surrounding land belonged to the Epiphany Monastery. On these lands stood a beautiful decorative forest, but the monastery authorities ordered it to be cut down.

In 1877, a tavern was operating in Marfino (most likely not in the village itself but in the area of Kashyokin Lug). There were 36 houses in 34 households, and out of 190 villagers, 16 were working elsewhere. In Marfino, 9 men and 1 woman were literate. The population was distributed by age as follows: 54 were under 15 years old, 32 were between 15 and 25 years old, and only 7 were over 60 years old, making up less than 4% of the population. The average life expectancy did not exceed 40 years.

On October 24, 1885, the Alexander-Marfin Children's Shelter with an elementary school was opened in Marfino, established and funded by the Epiphany Monastery. The shelter was created for orphaned boys and children from the poorest families of clergy, and it was dedicated to the memory of the coronation of Their Imperial Majesties in 1883. The shelter taught carpentry, bookbinding, singing, and violin playing. Distinguished students were awarded gifts, and all graduates received a copy of the Holy Gospel. With the opening of the shelter's church, Marfino ceased to be a village and acquired the status of a hamlet.

Until 1905, Marfino was part of the Second Police District of Moscow County. On December 19, 1905, by the Highest Approved Opinion of the State Council of the Russian Empire, Marfino was transferred from the jurisdiction of the Moscow County Police to the jurisdiction of the Moscow Metropolitan Police.

The year 1923 marked the end for the church in Marfino. That year, the Sokolniki District Executive Committee decided to request the city authorities to close the house church at the orphanage (by that time, the shelter had been transformed into an orphanage) and transfer the church premises to a kindergarten.

On November 29, 1927, by a decree of the All-Russian Central Executive Committee, Marfino, along with Rostokino, Alekseevskoye, and Nizhniye Likhobory, was incorporated into Moscow. In 1928, Marfino (now within the boundaries of Moscow) was a small settlement located on both sides of Bolshaya Marfinskaya Street. Half a verst from Marfino, on the road to Ostankino, was another settlement—Kashyokin Lug, named after the Kashyonka River (more precisely, the Kamenka River), one of the right tributaries of the Yauza River, which is now enclosed in a pipe and hidden underground.

On the 1937 map of the Rostokino District, the village of Marfino lies north of Kamenka. In the eastern part of Marfino, there is a large rectangle, presumably the orphanage, with a small pond in the northern part of its territory. Between Marfino and Susokolovskoye Highway lies a forest, in the center of which is a small swamp. Between Kashyokinskaya Streets and the Oktyabrskaya Railway, as well as between Kashyokin Lug and Marfino, there is an entire division of greenhouses, likely part of the Marfino State Farm. After the Great Patriotic War, the former shelter premises were transferred to the Institute of Automation. Here, the famous "sharashka" (an MGB research institute where imprisoned specialists from labor camps worked) was located, described by A. I. Solzhenitsyn in his book The First Circle. Essentially, the "Marfino Sharashka" gave rise to the Marfino district. The Marfino Laboratory was upgraded to a research institute. Today, it is the head enterprise of the Avtomatika Concern OJSC. Along with the institute, the Marfino district grew. The first five-story building was constructed by the employees themselves. Gradually, all the houses of the village of Marfino were demolished, and urban buildings were erected in their place. This is how the first streets appeared—Botanicheskaya, Malaya Botanicheskaya, and Akademika Komarova Street.

Over 70 years, until Marfino became an independent district, it was part of five different districts. In 1977, Marfino became part of the Kirovsky District of Moscow. In 1991, the Marfino Municipal District was formed, and in 1995, it received the status of a district of Moscow.

Marfino has only three nature conservation areas: a boulevard along Gostinichnaya Street with an area of 2 hectares, a projected boulevard along Komdiva Orlova Street with an area of 2.9 hectares, and Vladykino Cemetery with an area of 1.1 hectares. Among all the districts of the North-Eastern Administrative Okrug, Marfino ranks last in terms of the number of natural complexes within its territory. However, the district itself is quite small.

The southern part of the Marfino district was a separate settlement called Kashyokin Lug. To this day, one of the streets in Marfino bears this name. It originated from a mistake made in the 19th century when a clerk accidentally wrote "Kashyokin Lug" instead of "Kamenkin Lug" (meaning a meadow on the Kamenka River). The new name stuck, and few residents of Kashyokin Lug Street are aware that the Kamenka River, which gave the street and the area its name, flows in a pipe nearby. Since 1925, the street leading from Kashyokin Lug to the road to Sergiev Posad was named Bolshaya Kashyokinskaya Street. On March 1, 1966, it was renamed Akademika Komarova Street.

== Road Infrastructure ==
The level of road infrastructure in the district lags behind other districts of the North-Eastern Administrative Okrug (NEAO). Due to violations of building codes and regulations during the construction of microdistricts 51-52, almost no space was left for roads in this area. As a result, road construction here faces opposition from residents whose windows face the planned roads.

Currently, one of the most important transport arteries in the district is Komdiva Orlova Street, which merges into Botanicheskaya Street. Beyond the First Altufyevsky Overpass, Botanicheskaya Street transitions into Altufyevskoye Highway.

In the northern part of the district, Stationnaya Street runs along the Small Ring of the Moscow Railway. On the other side of the railway, in the Otradnoye district, it is paralleled by Signalny Proezd. In the near future, both Stationnaya Street and Signalny Proezd will become part of two new highways: the North-Western Chord and the North-Eastern Chord.

== See also ==
- Administrative divisions of Moscow
