= Babushkin Bay =

Bay

Coordinates: 59°02′N 153°25′E

Babushkin Bay (Russian: Залив Бабушкина, tr.: Zaliv Babushkina) is a deep bay with steep shores on the northern coast of the Sea of Okhotsk. It lies to the east of Taui Bay and to the west of Shelikhov Bay. It is entered between Capes Yevreinov and Babushkin and is 59.5 km (about 37 mi) wide.
