= Babushkin (surname) =

Babushkin (Russian: Бабушкин; masculine) or Babushkina (Бабушкина; feminine) is a Russian surname derived from the word "бабушка", meaning "grandmother" or "elderly woman". Notable people with the surname include:

- Andrei Babushkin (1964–2022), Russian sociologist and human rights activist
- Ivan Babushkin (1873–1906), Russian politician and revolutionary
- Mikhail Babushkin (1893–1938), Russian aviator and Hero of the Soviet Union
- Olesya Babushkina (born 1989), Belarusian gymnast
