= Babushkinsky =

Babushkinsky (masculine), Babushkinskaya (feminine), or Babushkinskoye (neuter) may refer to:

- Babushkinsky District, several districts in Russia
- Babushkinskoye Urban Settlement, a municipal formation in Kabansky Municipal District of the Republic of Buryatia, Russia
- Babushkinskaya, a station of the Moscow Metro, Moscow, Russia
