= Babushkinsky District =

Location of Moscow in Russia

Location of Vologda Oblast in Russia

Babushkinsky District is the name of several administrative and municipal districts in Russia.

- Babushkinsky District, Moscow, a district in North-Eastern Administrative Okrug of Moscow
- Babushkinsky District (Moscow, 1969—1991) a different, former district in Moscow
- Babushkinsky District, Vologda Oblast, an administrative and municipal district of Vologda Oblast

== See also ==
- Babushkinsky (disambiguation)
