= Rostokino District =

Rostokino District район Ростокино (Russian)
- District
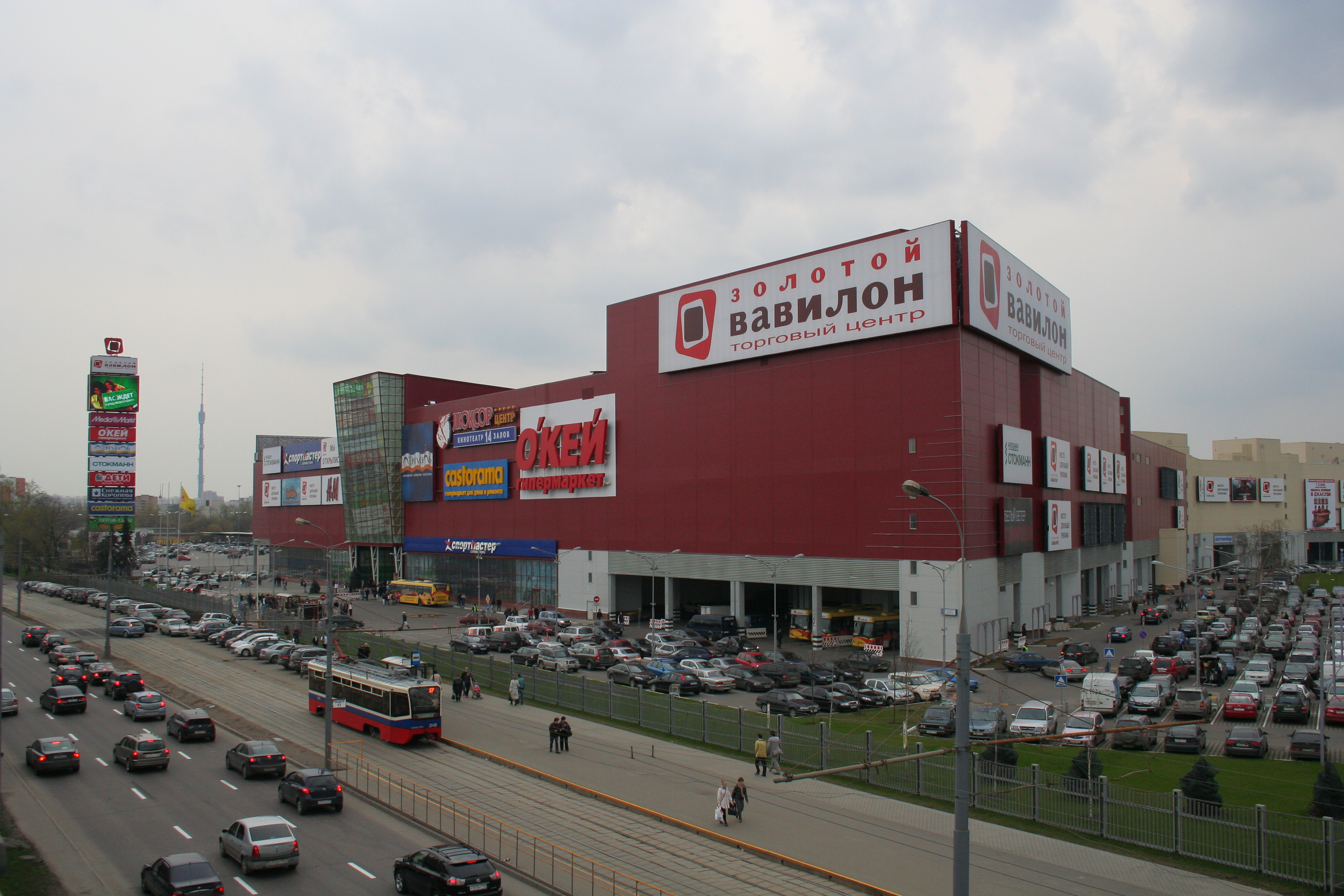
- A shopping center in Rostokino District

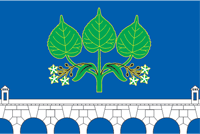
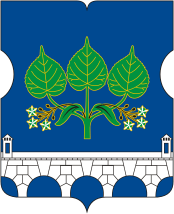
- Flag Coat of arms
- Location of Rostokino District in Moscow (pre-2012 map)
- Coordinates: 55°50′N 37°39′E
- Country: Russia
- Federal subject: federal city of Moscow

Population (2010 Census)
  - Total: 37,505

Municipal structure
  - Municipally incorporated as: Rostokino Municipal Okrug
- Time zone: UTC+
- OKTMO ID: 45360000
- Website: http://rostokino.mos.ru

Population of Rostokino District
- 2010 Census: 37,505
- 2002 Census: 35,134

Rostokino District (Russian: райо́н Росто́кино) is an administrative district (raion), one of the seventeen in North-Eastern Administrative Okrug of the federal city of Moscow, Russia. It is located on both banks of the Yauza River and borders with Yaroslavsky District in the northeast, Sviblovo District in the northwest, and Ostankinsky District in the south. As of the 2010 Census, the total population of the district was 37,505.

== History ==
The area now known as Rostokino District was once the site of the village of Rostokino, which gave its name to the Rostokino Aqueduct, Rostokino Overpass, Rostokino Bridges, Rostokino Street, and the Rostokino station of the Moscow Circular Railway.

The village of Rostokino has been known since the 15th century, when it belonged to Mikhail Borisovich Pleshcheev, a close boyar to the Grand Princes of Moscow, Vasily II (the Dark) and Ivan III. After the death of his wife, Pleshcheev donated Rostokino (Rostokinskoye) to the Trinity-Sergius Monastery in 1447 as a gesture for the repose of her soul[3]. As a monastic possession, the village prospered rapidly, as its residents were granted an "obelnaya" charter, exempting them from all state duties and taxes, and requiring them to work solely for the monastery. The village maintained a monastic herd, a mill on the Yauza River (whose milling profits went to the monastery's treasury), and a ferry crossing the Yauza in spring. Historical records mention a wooden Church of the Resurrection of Christ in the village, containing "icons, sacred books, and vestments," with four bells in its bell tower.

On September 28, 1552, the people of Moscow welcomed Tsar Ivan IV (the Terrible) in Rostokino after his victory over the Kazan Khanate.

During the Time of Troubles, Rostokino suffered greatly: it was repeatedly traversed by Polish-Lithuanian forces and Cossack detachments supporting the False Dmitrys. The village was ravaged, the church burned down, and its inhabitants scattered.

In 1613, a large band of Cossacks engaged in banditry along the Trinity Road sent messengers from Rostokino to Tsar Mikhail Fyodorovich, declaring their readiness to cease their criminal activities and enter the sovereign's service. The tsar sent officials to register the Cossacks, but they resisted and began setting up unauthorized ambushes ("storozhki") along the Trinity Road toward Moscow.

According to legend, the bandit Tanka Rostokinskaya, who committed crimes in the vicinity of the village, originated from Rostokino. The forest between Medvedkovo, Sviblovo, Rostokino, and Ostankino was known as "Tatyankin Forest".

In the 17th and 18th centuries, the village had 70–80 male residents, with a total population of about 200 people. Houses were built along the Yauza River and on both sides of the Trinity Road, which was always bustling with activity. Pilgrims traveled "to Sergius," royal couriers raced by, military personnel rode through, and merchant caravans moved along the road.

In 1764, Rostokino came under the jurisdiction of the College of Economy, and its peasants began engaging in carting alongside agriculture. Under Paul I, Rostokino and Cherkizovo were granted to Metropolitan Platon. During the reign of Alexander I, the village once again became state property.

From the second half of the 19th century, Rostokino gradually transformed into an industrial suburb. Small enterprises emerged one after another: a calico-printing factory, a cotton-spinning mill, and factories producing tarpaulin and revolver cartridges. Nevertheless, Rostokino remained a popular dacha destination for Muscovites for a long time.

Rostokino became enclosed within the ring of the Moscow Circular Railway, constructed between 1903 and 1908, which became the official boundary of the city in the spring of 1917. The Rostokino station was built on the railway, where, incidentally, Nicholas II visited in 1908. However, the village retained its rural character for a long time, and only in the post-war period did the construction of modern standardized residential buildings begin.

== Etymology ==
The district takes its name from the village that stood in this area before being subsumed by Moscow, whose name in Old East Slavic literally means river split.

== Municipal status ==
As a municipal division, it is incorporated as Rostokino Municipal Okrug.

== Miscellaneous ==
The main landmark is the 18th-century Rostokino Aqueduct. Gorky Film Studio is located in the district.
