= Severnoye Medvedkovo District =

- District
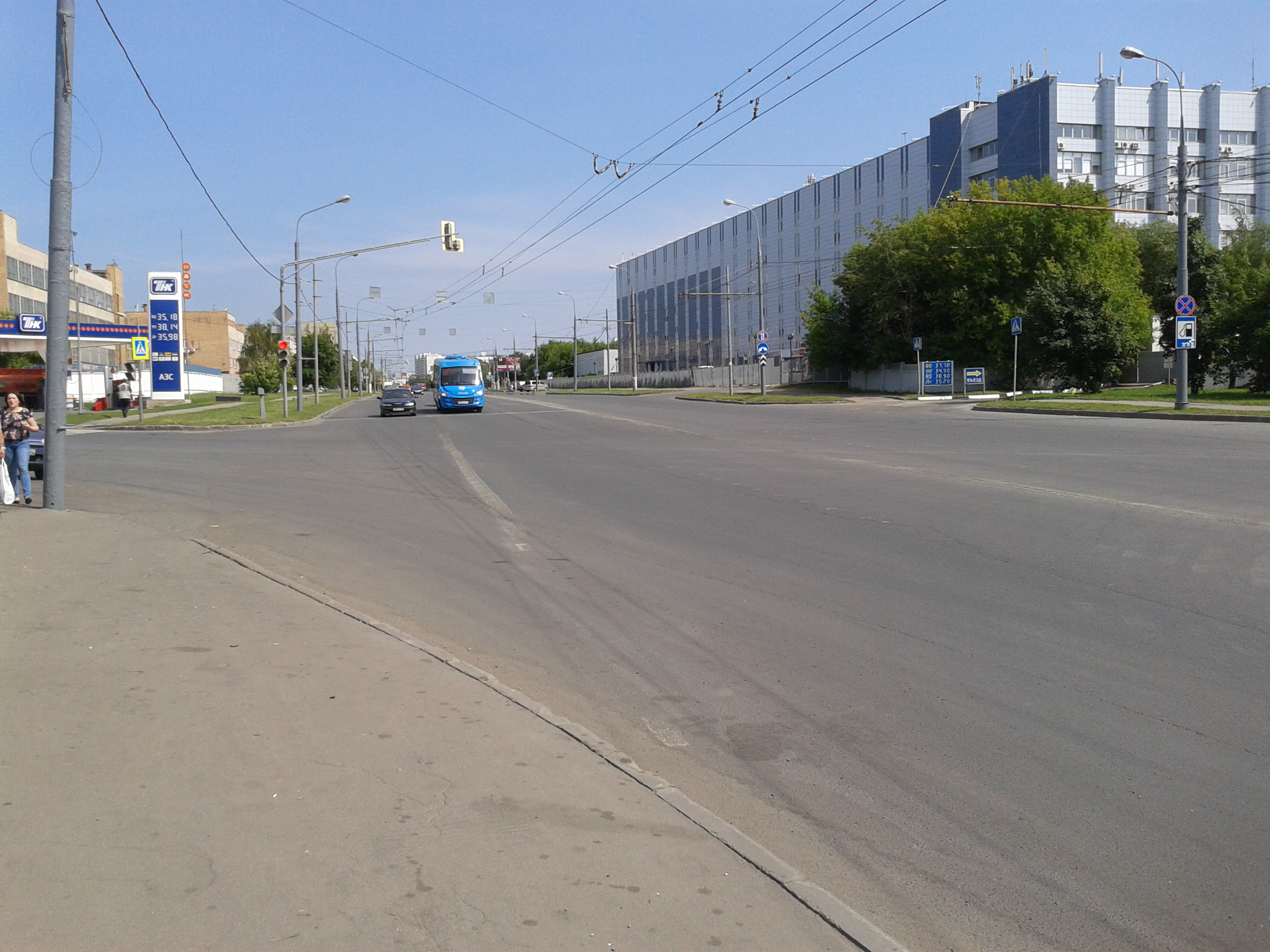

- Flag Coat of arms
- Coordinates: 55°53′20″N 37°39′19″E
- Country: Russia
- Federal subject: Moscow
- Time zone: UTC+3 (MSK)
- OKTMO ID: 45362000
- Website: https://www.smedvedkovo.ru/

Severnoye Medvedkovo District (Russian: райо́н Се́верное Медве́дково) is an administrative district (raion) of North-Eastern Administrative Okrug, and one of the 125 raions of Moscow, Russia.

== Territory and borders ==
The district is located in the northeastern part of Moscow, within the North-Eastern Administrative Okrug. Its boundaries run along the axis of the 500 kV power line, then follow the city limits of Moscow (the outer boundary of the right-of-way of the Moscow Ring Road, including all street and road interchanges), the axis of the Yauza River, the axes of Molodtsova Street, Polyarnaya Street, Chermyanskaya Street, and the axis of the Chermyanka River up to the 500 kV power line. To the south, it borders the Yuzhnoye Medvedkovo district, to the west—the Bibirevo district, and to the east and southeast—the Losinoostrovsky and Babushkinsky districts. Within the district, three rivers flow—the Yauza, the Chermyanka, and the Kozevsky Stream.

== History ==
Previously, the area now occupied by the district was home to the villages of Vatutino and Raevo, while the historical Medvedkovo settlement was located to the south of the current district's territory.

In 1960, this area was incorporated into Moscow following the expansion of the city's boundaries up to the Moscow Ring Road (MKAD). Initially, it was part of the Babushkinsky District and later the Kirovsky District. Active development took place during the 1960s and 1970s. The Medvedkovo metro station was constructed in 1978. Currently, there is ongoing demolition of five-story buildings from the 1960s, commonly known as "Khrushchyovkas," of which more than half had been demolished by May 2011.

In 1991, the North-Eastern Administrative Okrug was established. Within it, the temporary municipal district of "Yuzhnoye Medvedkovo" was formed. In 1995, it was granted the status of an official district of Moscow.

== Gallery ==
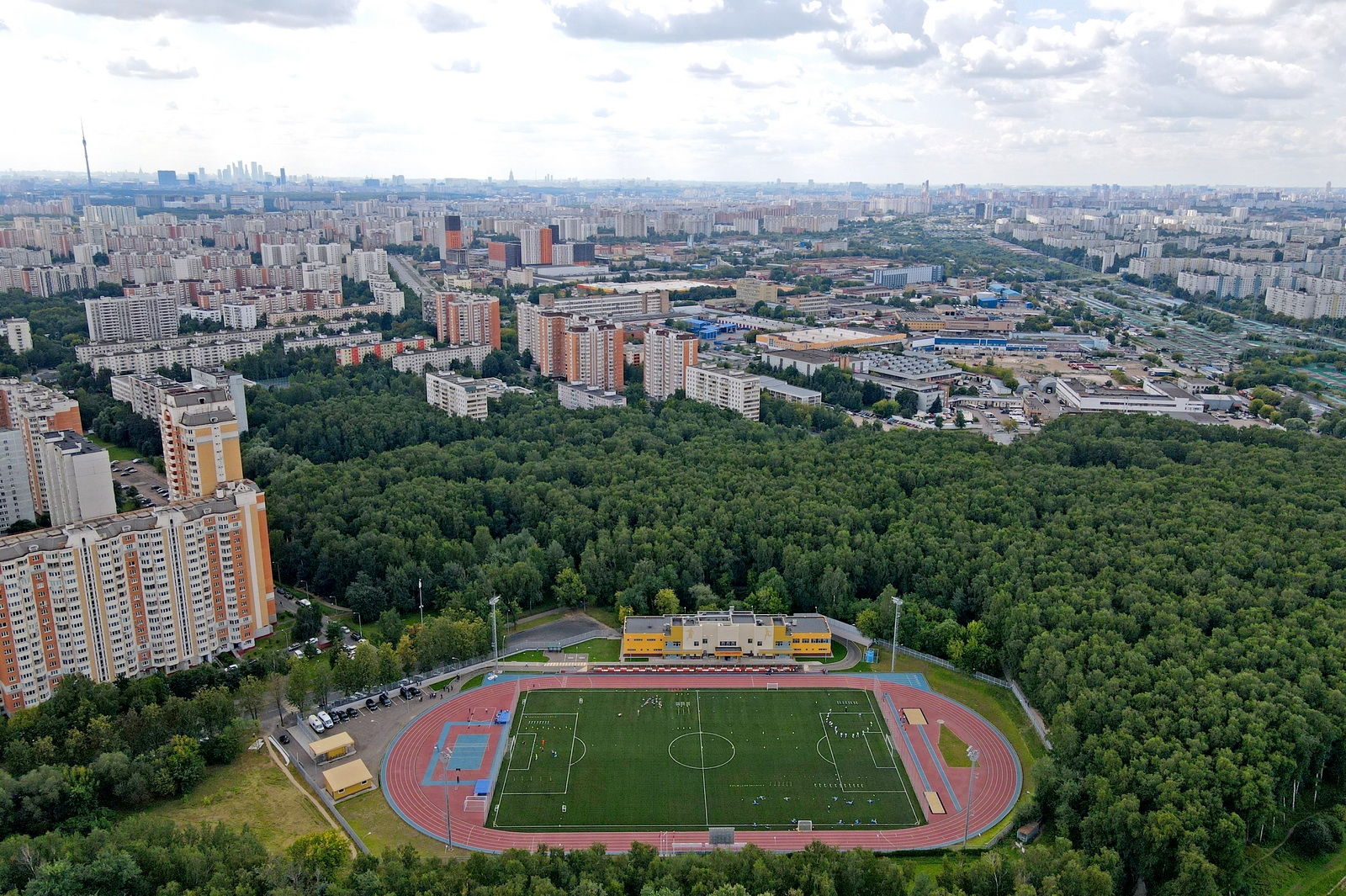
The sports stadium at Studyony Passage and Medvedkovsky forest park.

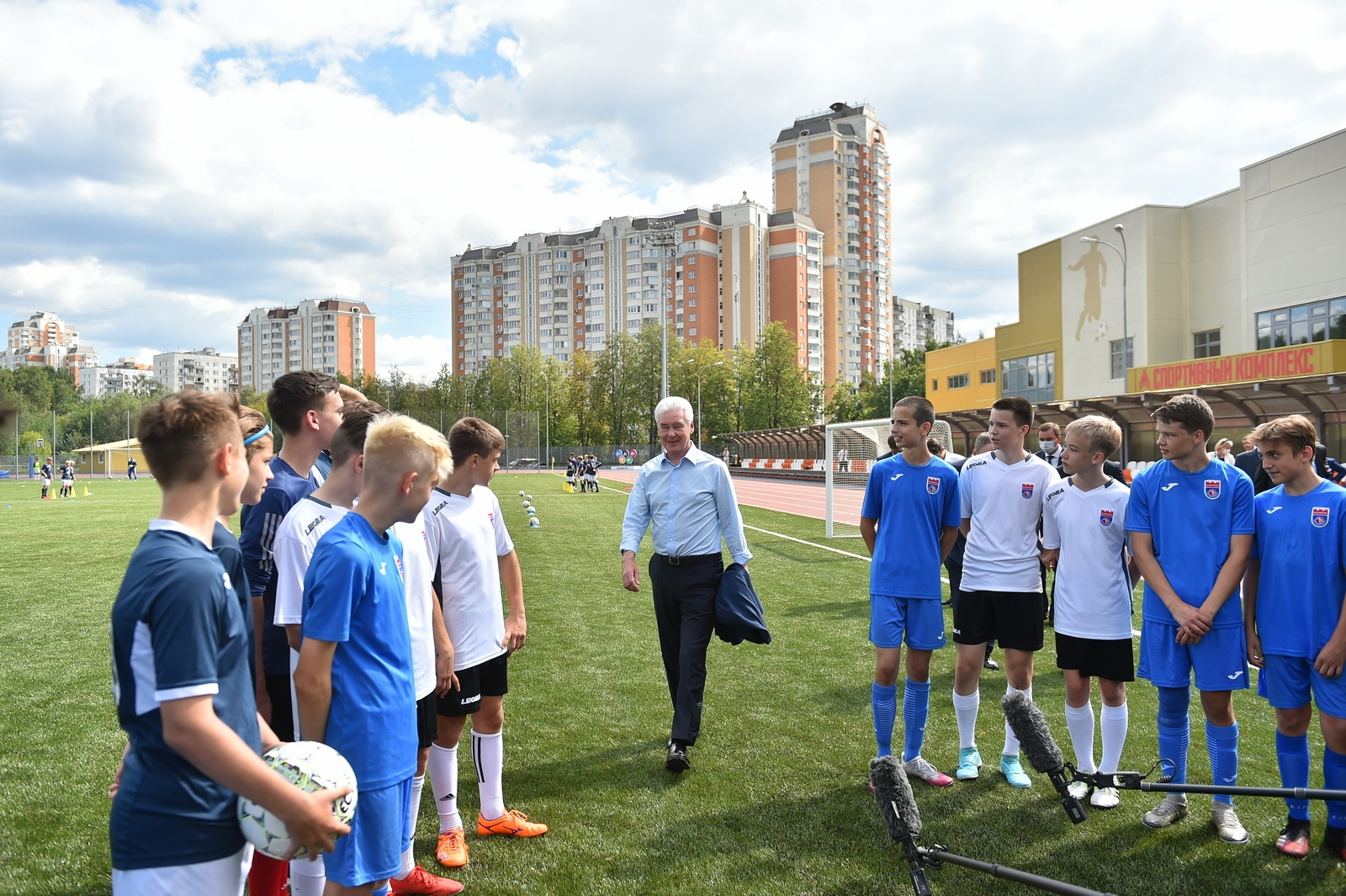
Opening ceremony of the stadium with the participation of the mayor of Moscow in August 2020.

== See also ==
- Administrative divisions of Moscow
