= Alexeyevsky District =

Alexeyevsky District is the name of several administrative and municipal districts in Russia. The districts' name generally derives from or is related to the male first name Alexey.

== Districts of the federal subjects ==
Federal subjects of Russia which have an entity called Alexeyevsky District

- Alexeyevsky District, Belgorod Oblast, an administrative and municipal district of Belgorod Oblast
- Alexeyevsky District, Moscow, a district in North-Eastern Administrative Okrug of Moscow
- Alexeyevsky District, Samara Oblast, an administrative and municipal district of Samara Oblast
- Alexeyevsky District, Republic of Tatarstan, an administrative and municipal district of the Republic of Tatarstan
- Alexeyevsky District, Volgograd Oblast, an administrative and municipal district of Volgograd Oblast

== Renamed districts ==
- Alexeyevsky District, name of Tattinsky District of the Sakha Republic in 1930–1990

== See also ==
- Alexeyevsky (disambiguation)
