= Yaroslavsky District, Moscow =

Yaroslavsky District, Moscow Ярославский (Russian)
- District
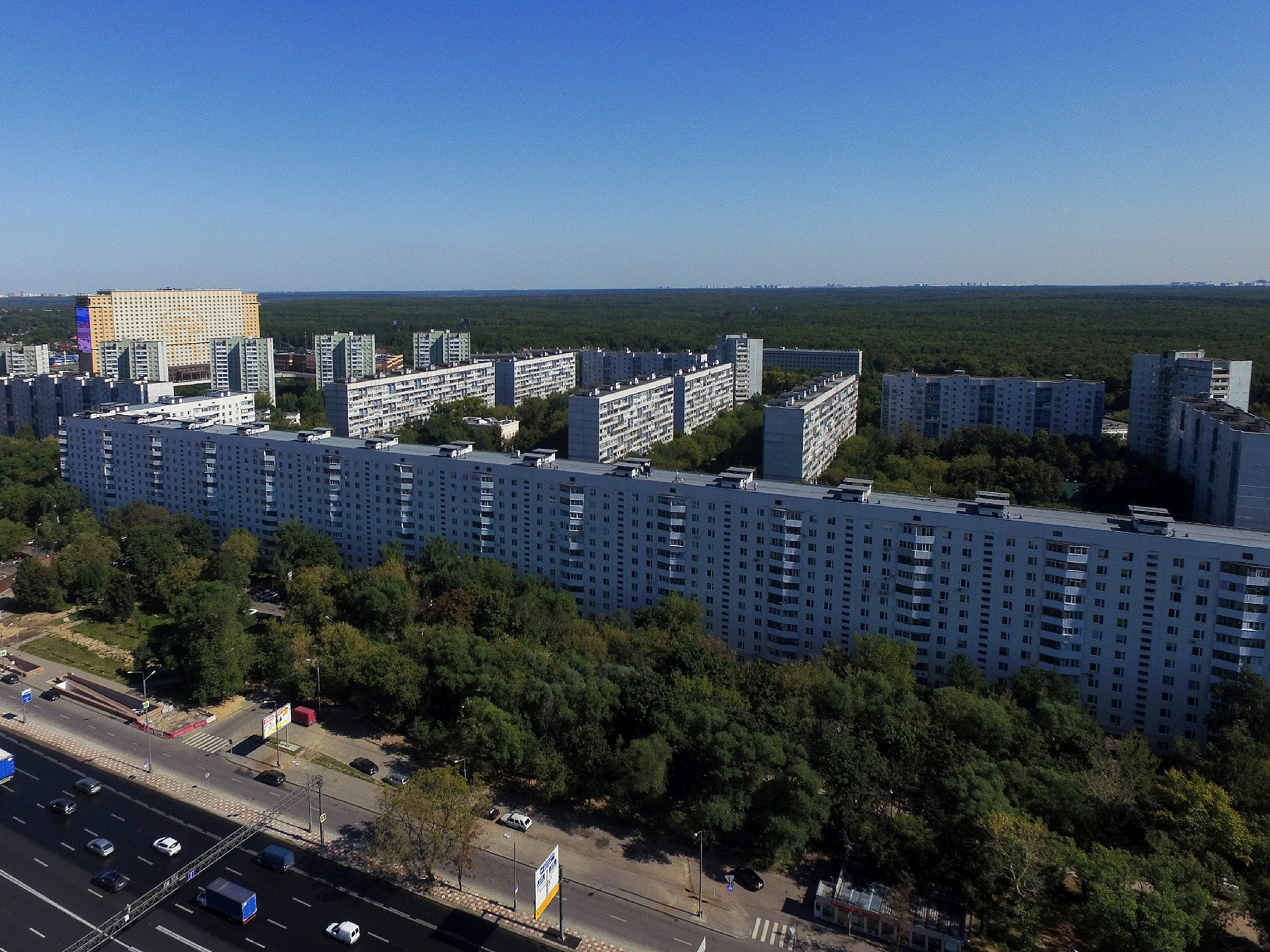
- Northern part of Yaroslavskoye shosse; Hanoi trade center and Losiny Ostrov national park are in the background.

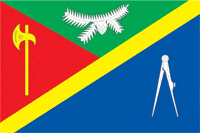
- Flag Coat of arms
- Location of Yaroslavsky District, Moscow on the map of Moscow
- Coordinates: 55°52′N 37°42′E
- Country: Russia
- Federal subject: Moscow
- Time zone: UTC+
- OKTMO ID: 45365000
- Website: http://yaroslavsky.mos.ru/

Yaroslavsky District, Moscow (Russian: Яросла́вский райо́н) is an administrative district (raion) of North-Eastern Administrative Okrug, and one of the 125 raions of Moscow, Russia. The area of the district is 7.99 square kilometers (3.08 sq mi). The district is situated on both sides of a major highway, Yaroslavskoye shosse, east from Yaroslavsky railway, and is named after both. The railway serves as the district's western border, Losiny Ostrov national park is on its eastern border, and MKAD serves as its northern border. The Moscow State University of Civil Engineering is located in this district at 26 Yaroslavsky Highway.

== See also ==
- Administrative divisions of Moscow
