= Lianozovo District =

Lianozovo District район Лианозово (Russian)
- District
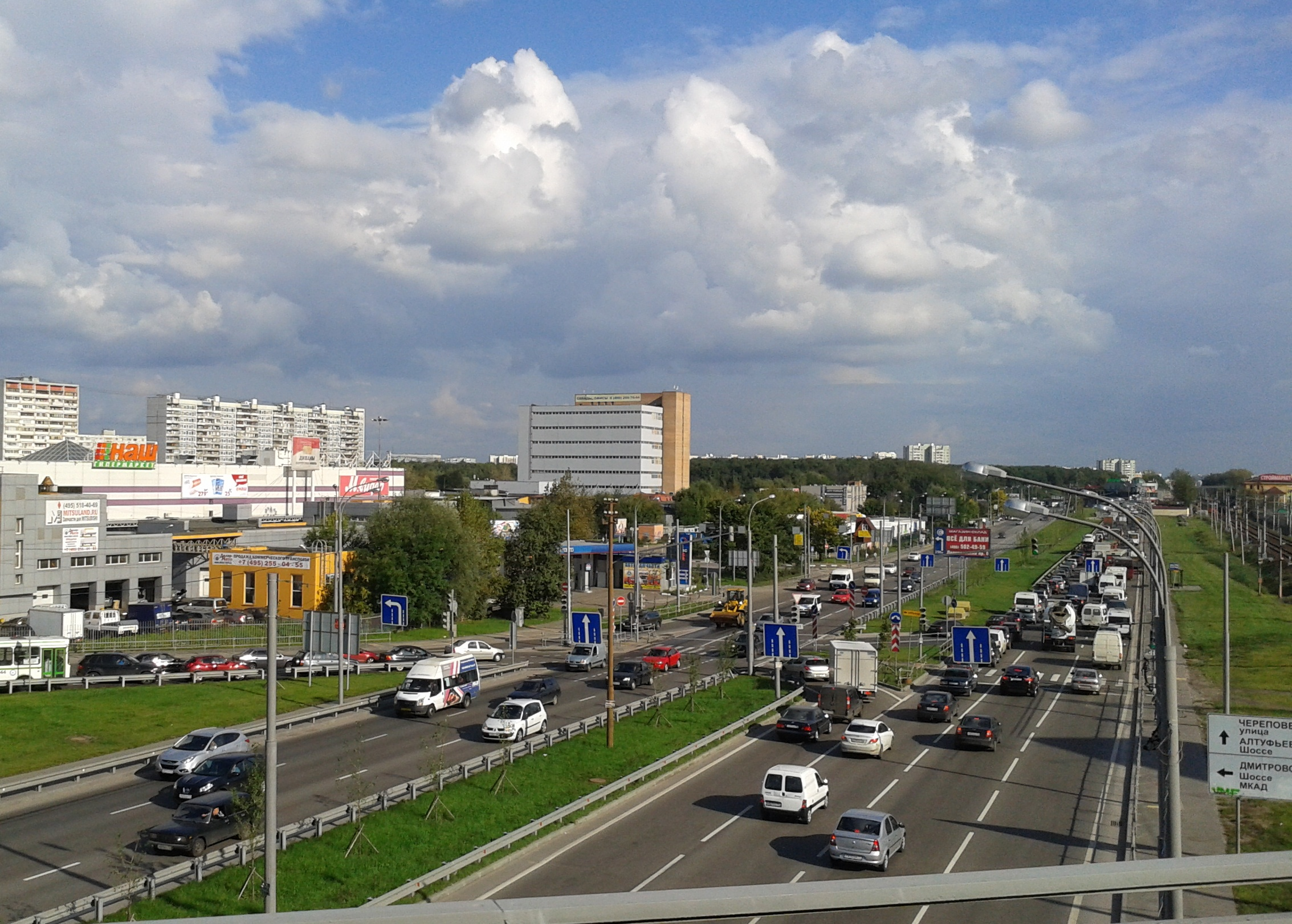
- Lianozovsky Passage in Lianozovo District

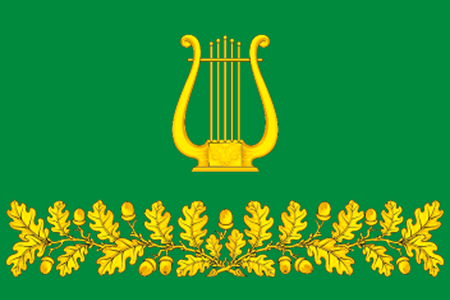
- Flag Coat of arms
- Location of Lianozovo District in Moscow (pre-2012 map)
- Coordinates: 55°54′N 37°34′E
- Country: Russia
- Federal subject: federal city of Moscow

Area
  - Total: 6.6 km^{2} (2.5 sq mi)

Population (2010 Census)
  - Total: 79,582
  - Density: 12,000/km^{2} (31,000/sq mi)

Municipal structure
  - Municipally incorporated as: Lianozovo Municipal Okrug
- Time zone: UTC+
- OKTMO ID: 45354000
- Website: http://lianozovo.mos.ru

Population of Lianozovo District
- 2010 Census: 79,582
- 2002 Census: 76,465

Lianozovo District (Russian: райо́н Лиано́зово) is an administrative district (raion), one of the seventeen in North-Eastern Administrative Okrug of the federal city of Moscow, Russia. It is located 15 km north of Moscow city center, on the south side of the Moscow Ring Road ('MKAD'). It borders with Moscow Oblast in the north, Bibirevo District in the east, Altufyevsky District in the south, and with Dmitrovsky District in the west. The area is 6.6 square kilometres (2.5 mi^{2}). As of the 2010 Census, the total population of the district was 79,582.

== History ==
The oldest known settlement on the territory of the present Lianozovo District is the village of Altufevo, whose history can be traced back to the 16th century. At the village there was a church and a manor which repeatedly changed owners.

The village of Lianozovo, on whose territory the district is located, arose at the beginning of the 20th century on the initiative of the industrialist S. G. Lianozov, who bought the Altufiyevo estate in 1888 and arranged summer cottages on its lands. Dachas in Lianozovo were owned by members of famous Moscow families. After the 1917 Russian Revolution, the settlement began to be populated by a public of proletarian and peasant origin. In 1960, after the construction of the Moscow Ring Road, the village became part of Moscow, and by the end of the 1970s it was destroyed for the construction of multi-storey houses on its lands.

== Municipal status ==
As a municipal division, it is incorporated as Lianozovo Municipal Okrug.
