= Severny District, Moscow =

Severny District, Moscow Северный (Russian)
- District
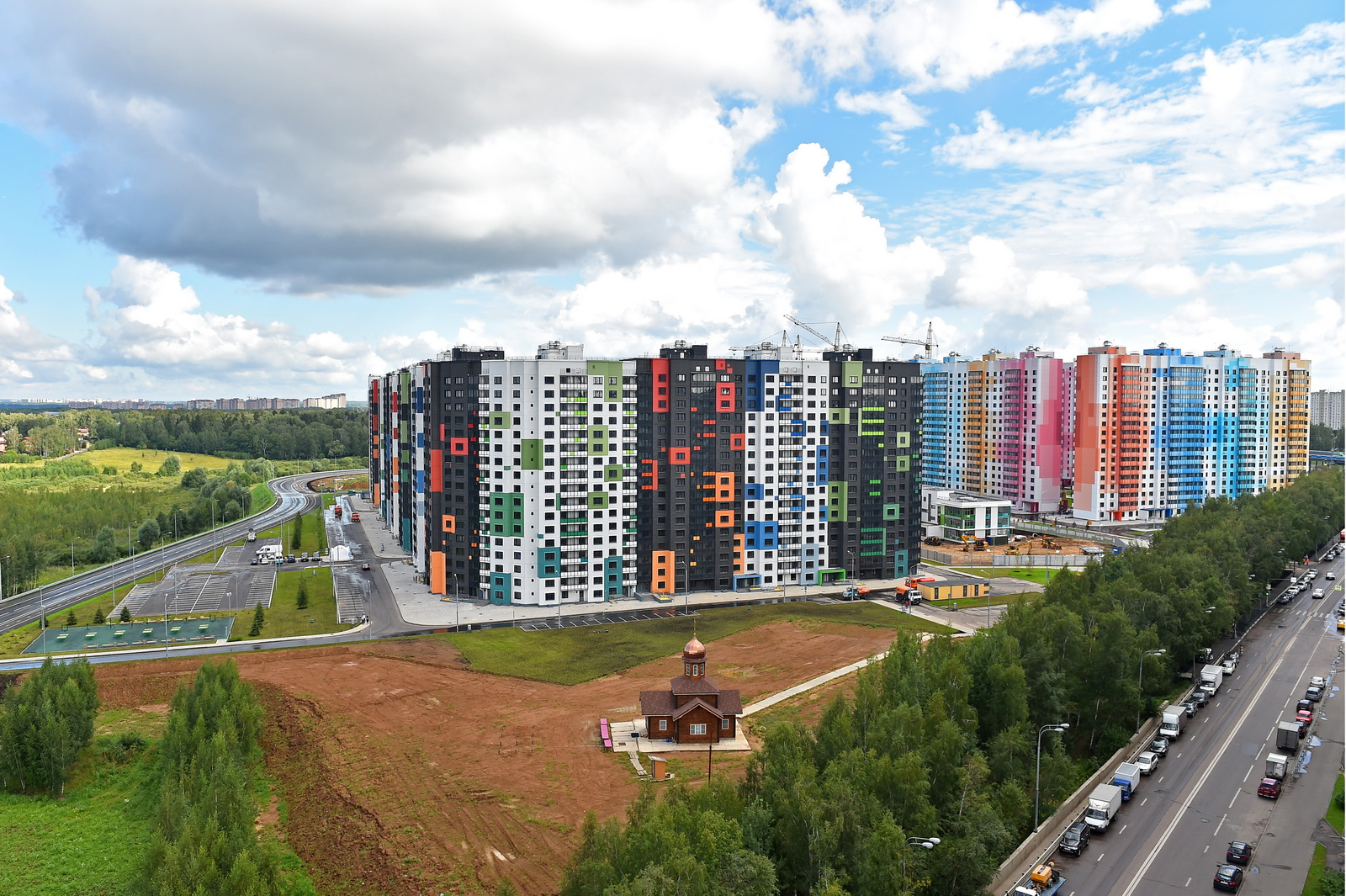
- Residential construction, Severny District

- Flag Coat of arms
- Location of Severny District, Moscow on the map of Moscow
- Coordinates: 55°55′48″N 37°33′39″E
- Country: Russia
- Federal subject: Moscow
- Time zone: UTC+
- OKTMO ID: 45363000
- Website: http://severny.mos.ru/

Severny District, Moscow (Russian: Се́верный райо́н) is an administrative district (raion) of North-Eastern Administrative Okrug, and one of the 125 raions of Moscow, Russia. The area of the district is 10.29 square kilometers (3.97 sq mi).

== Territory and borders ==
The boundaries of the Severny District are defined as follows[5]: along the axis of the right-of-way of the Moscow Ring Road (MKAD), then along the city limits of Moscow (following the northeastern boundary of the right-of-way of the Savyolovskoye direction of the Moscow Railway up to the 19th kilometer of the road; then 300 meters northeast; along the southern side of the driveway adjacent to the fields of the Dolgoprudny Agricultural Chemical Experimental Station; then 800 meters northeast (to the southern boundary of the property at No. 171 on Dmitrovskoye Highway in the village of Vinogradovo, Mytishchi Urban District, Moscow Oblast); further, crossing Dmitrovskoye Highway; then 900 meters along the northeastern boundary of the right-of-way of Dmitrovskoye Highway; then 600 meters northeast (excluding the territory of the gas station) to the territory of a special facility; then along the northern and western boundaries of the special facility's territory (including the vehicle area in front of the facility's entrance gates); the western and southern boundaries of the territory of the "Smorodinka" gardening association in the Mytishchi Urban District, Moscow Oblast; then 1 kilometer along the northern side of the road to the village of Afanasovo in the Mytishchi Urban District, Moscow Oblast; further along the western boundaries of the territory of the Khlebnikovskoye Forestry of the Northern Forest Park Management; and the western boundary of the territory of the pipeline route of the Northern Waterworks Station) back to the MKAD.

== History ==
The settlement of Severny was established in the early 1950s as a settlement associated with the Northern Waterworks Station, which supplies Moscow with drinking water from the Moscow Canal. In 1952, it was granted the status of a workers' settlement and was under the administrative jurisdiction of the Moscow City Council. By a decree of the Presidium of the Supreme Soviet of the RSFSR dated December 11, 1985, "On the Inclusion of Certain Settlements into the City of Moscow," the settlement of Severny was incorporated into the city limits of Moscow.

In 1991, the North-Eastern Administrative District was established, and within it, the temporary municipal district "Severny" was formed. In 1995, it was granted the status of a district of Moscow.

In the 2000s, large-scale construction began (by December 2011, the 1st, 4th, and 9th microdistricts of high-rise buildings, as well as the 2nd microdistrict—cottage settlements "Severnaya Sloboda," "Severnaya Sloboda-2" (in the final stages of construction), and "Arkhangelskoye-Tyurikovo" were completed). Additionally, the opening of a bypass road was announced, diverting traffic from the intersection of Dmitrovskoye Highway and the Moscow Ring Road (MKAD). In October 2016, the road was named Akademika Flërova Street. It extends through the Lianozovo District from the overpass on Dmitrovskoye Highway along the Savyolovskoye direction of the Moscow Railway, passing the Mark station, continues through the Severny District to the Meryanka River, turns northeast, and follows the riverbank to Dolgoprudnenskoye Highway, beyond which it is continued by Akademika Alikhanova Street.

In 2017, according to research by the company Yandex, Severny was recognized as the worst district in Moscow, ranking below Kapotnya and Nekrasovka. The rating took into account transport accessibility, living infrastructure, and environmental conditions.

== Gallery ==
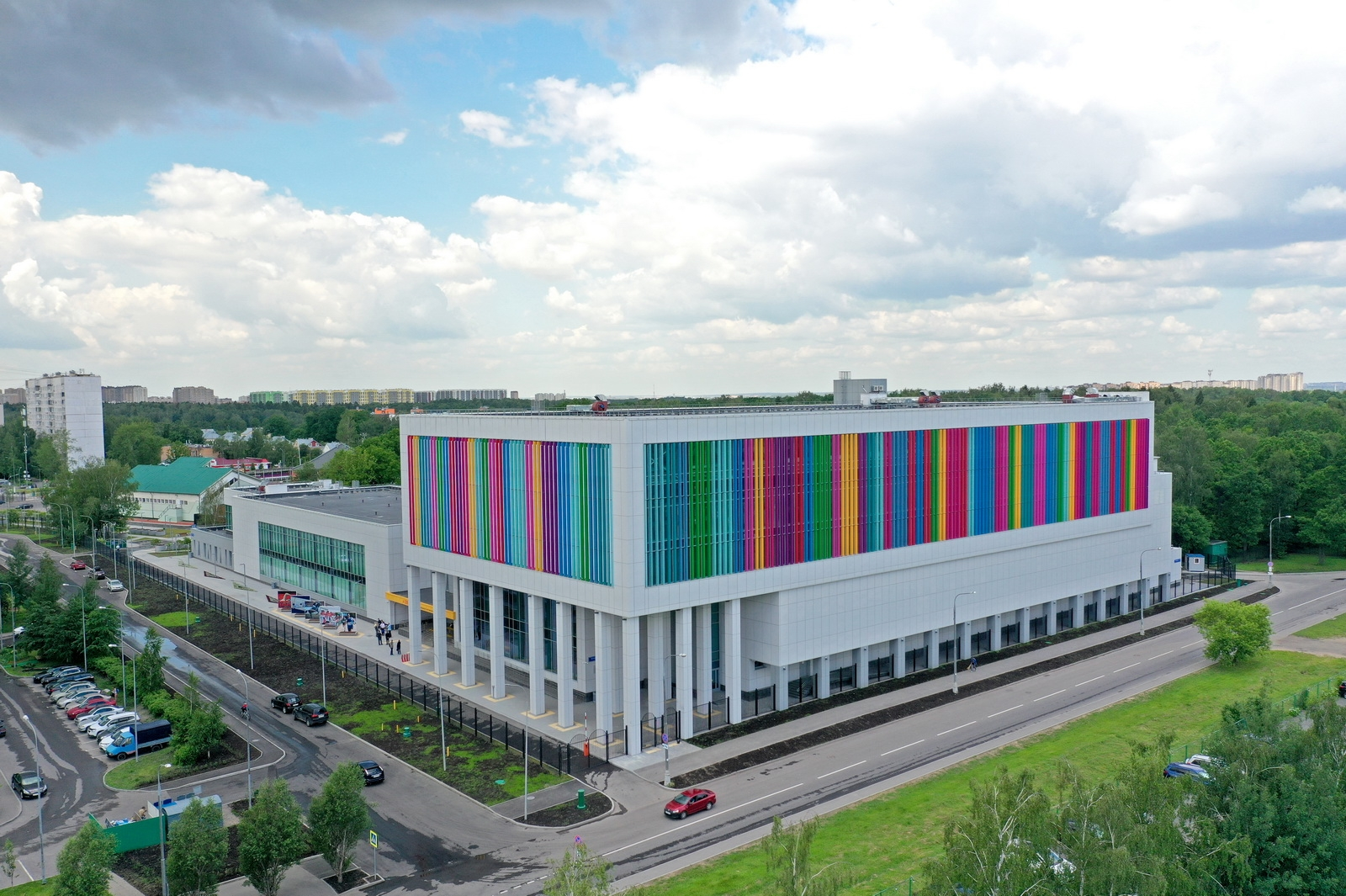

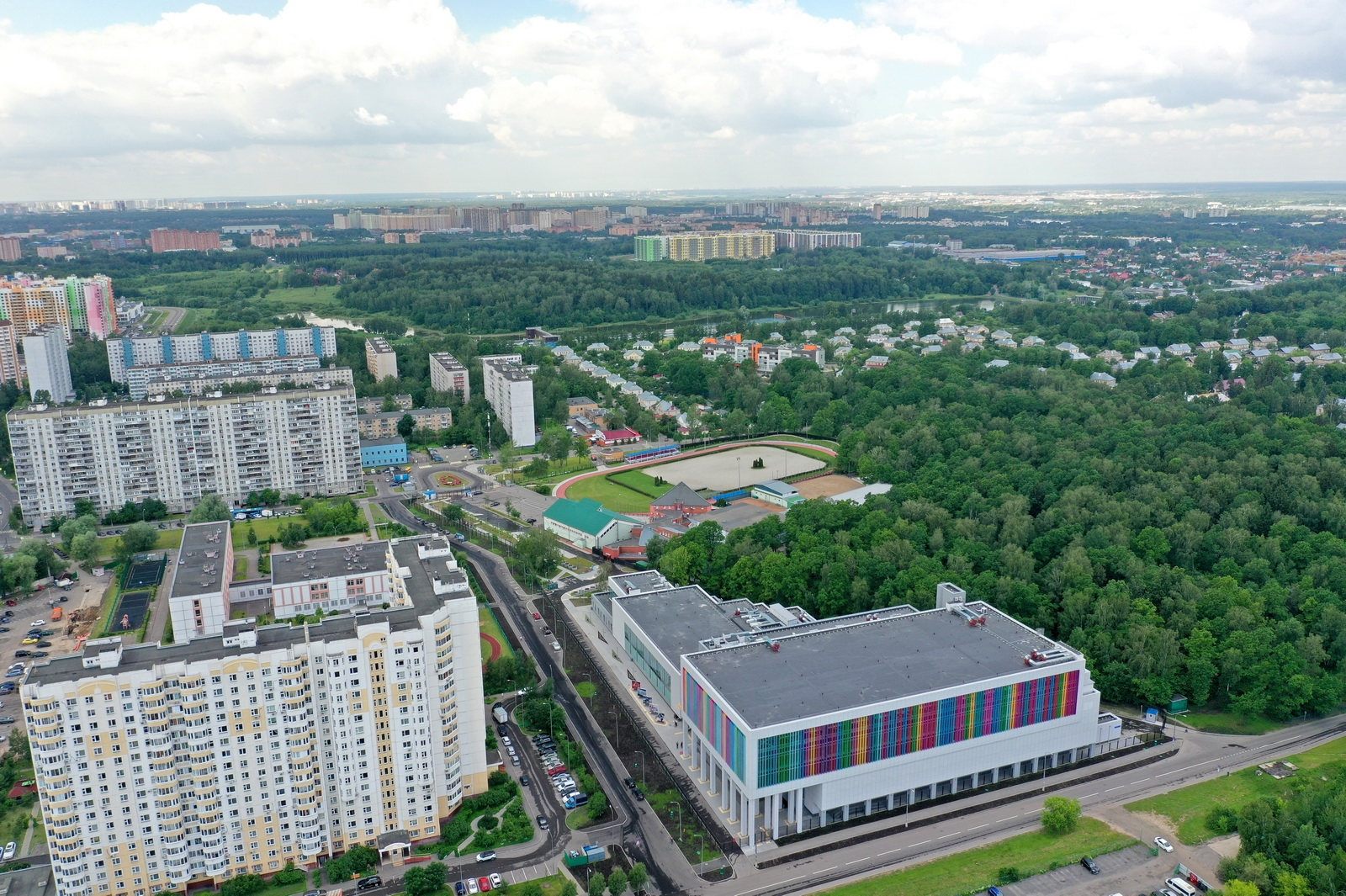

== See also ==
- Administrative divisions of Moscow
