= Maryina Roshcha District =

Maryina Roshcha District район Марьина роща (Russian)
- District
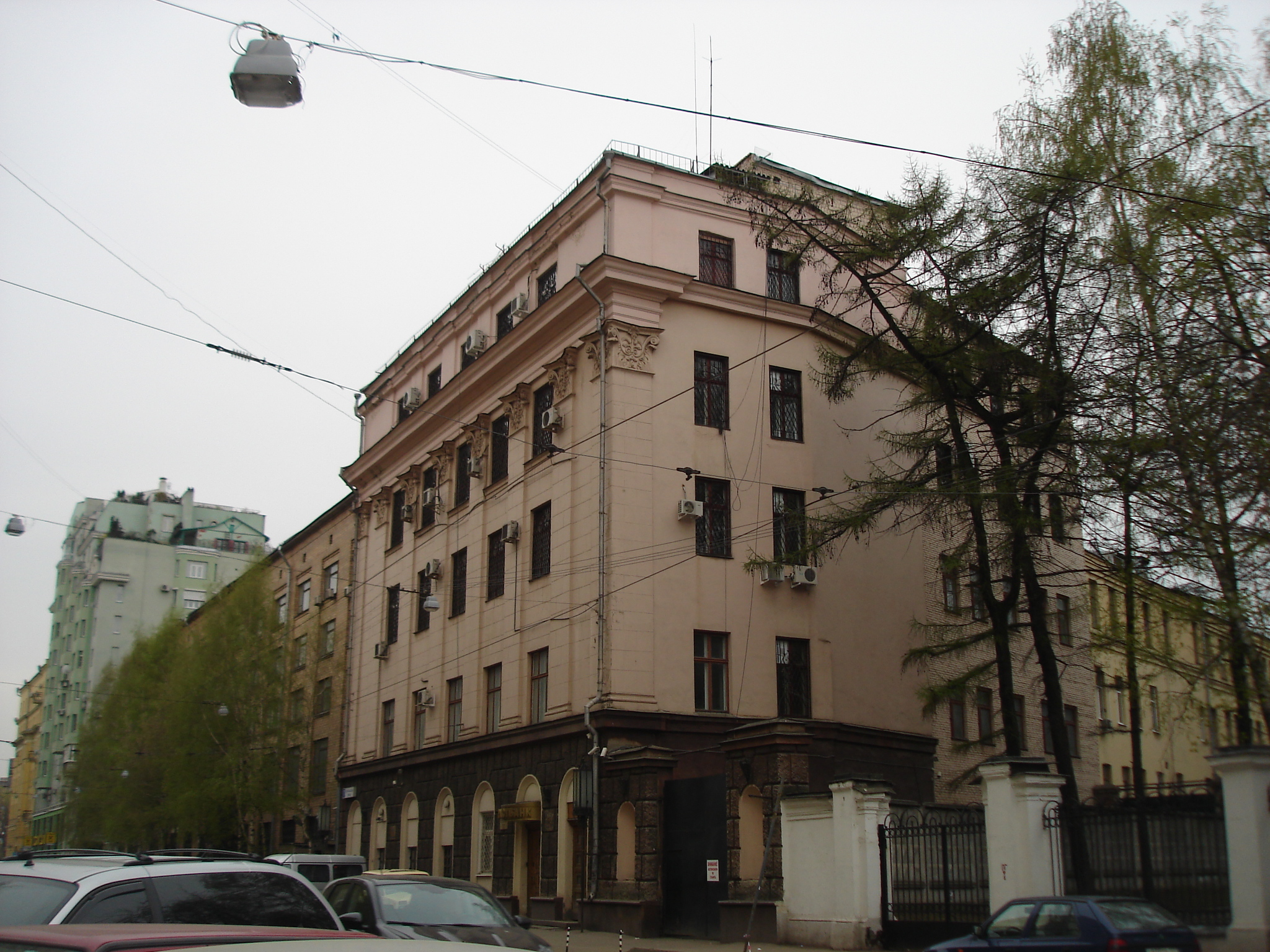
- Street in Maryina Roshcha District

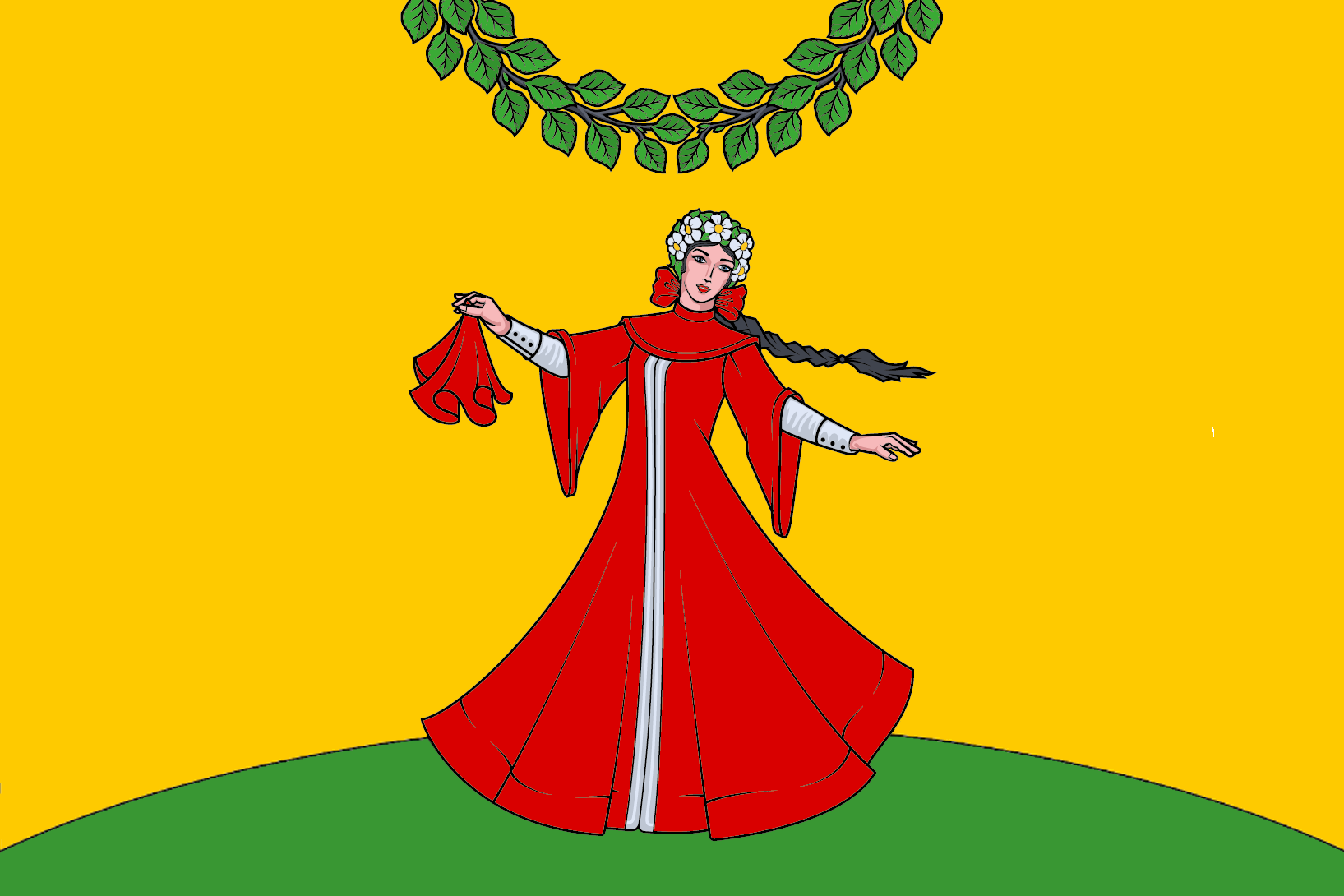
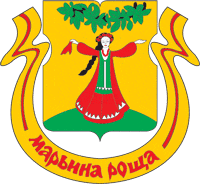
- Flag Coat of arms
- Location of Maryina Roshcha District in Moscow (pre-2012 map)
- Coordinates: 55°48′N 37°37′E
- Country: Russia
- Federal subject: federal city of Moscow

Population (2010 Census)
  - Total: 65,973

Municipal structure
  - Municipally incorporated as: Maryina roshcha Municipal Okrug
- Time zone: UTC+
- OKTMO ID: 45357000
- Website: http://marina-roscha.mos.ru

Population of Maryina Roshcha District
- 2010 Census: 65,973
- 2002 Census: 60,194

Maryina Roshcha District (Russian: райо́н Ма́рьина ро́ща, lit. "Mary's grove") is an administrative district (raion), one of the seventeen in North-Eastern Administrative Okrug of the federal city of Moscow, Russia. As of the 2010 Census, the total population of the district was 65,973.

The historical area of Maryina Roshcha, which emerged in the mid-19th century on the site of Sheremetev family lands, retained its low-rise, country style until the 1960s.

== History ==
The village of Maryino (Ма́рьино), also known as Boyarkino (Боя́ркино), appears in official registers since 1678, when it had a population of 102 people in 22 households. Maryino and the adjacent village of Ostankino (located on the territory of modern Ostankinsky District) with a park were owned by the Cherkassky family. In the mid-18th century, the last Princess Cherkassky married Count P. B. Sheremetev and the land passed into Sheremetev family's possession. Sheremetevskaya Street—the main north–south street of the district—is still named after these past landlords. Around this time, a grove (roshcha) near the village of Maryino was called "Maryina", a name that "has stuck to this day, even though the grove was completely cut down in the late 19th century".

After the Great Fire of 1812, the groves between Moscow and Maryino were felled for timber, but quickly recovered and became a popular picnic destination. The name Maryina Roshcha became a toponym independent of the old Maryino village. Vasily Zhukovsky wrote a romantic story of the same name; his version of the etymology is pure fiction, as is the legend linking Maryina Roshcha to a female highway robber called Marya.

Between 1851 and 1882, railroad construction isolated Maryina Roshcha from Moscow (south) and Ostankino (north). In the 1880s, a French real estate developer signed a long-term lease with the Sheremetev family, cleared the trees, and leveled the area for cheap low-rise construction, creating the rectangular grid of streets and alleys that still exists today. However, they did not bother to set up water supply or a sewage system. The proximity of railroads quickly attracted industrialists like Gustav List, who built factories on the edges of Maryina Roshcha. Wooden houses were occupied by workers of these factories, including an ethnic minority of Mordvin laborers, who settled in the area in 1901. The existing orthodox church of Unexpected Joy was built by public subscription in 1899-1904 and operated continuously through the Soviet years.

Maryina Roshcha was considered a criminal ghetto, especially after World War I and Russian Civil War, when law-abiding men were drafted and perished in the army, and the Bolshevik administration expropriated all livestock from the residents. The area remained unsafe until the 1960s. The post-World War II Maryina Roshcha underworld was featured in The Meeting Place Cannot Be Changed mini-series.

Joseph Stalin's master plan of 1935 proposed building a north–south highway through Maryina Roshcha, which would have led to demolition of the 19th-century housing. This plan did not materialize, and while wooden Maryina Roshcha was being gradually demolished, some wooden buildings survived until the 1960s. The remainder was cleared in the late 1970s in preparation for the 1980 Summer Olympics. The last remaining tram lines were closed in 2002, when the district's southern boundary was converted into the Third Ring highway.

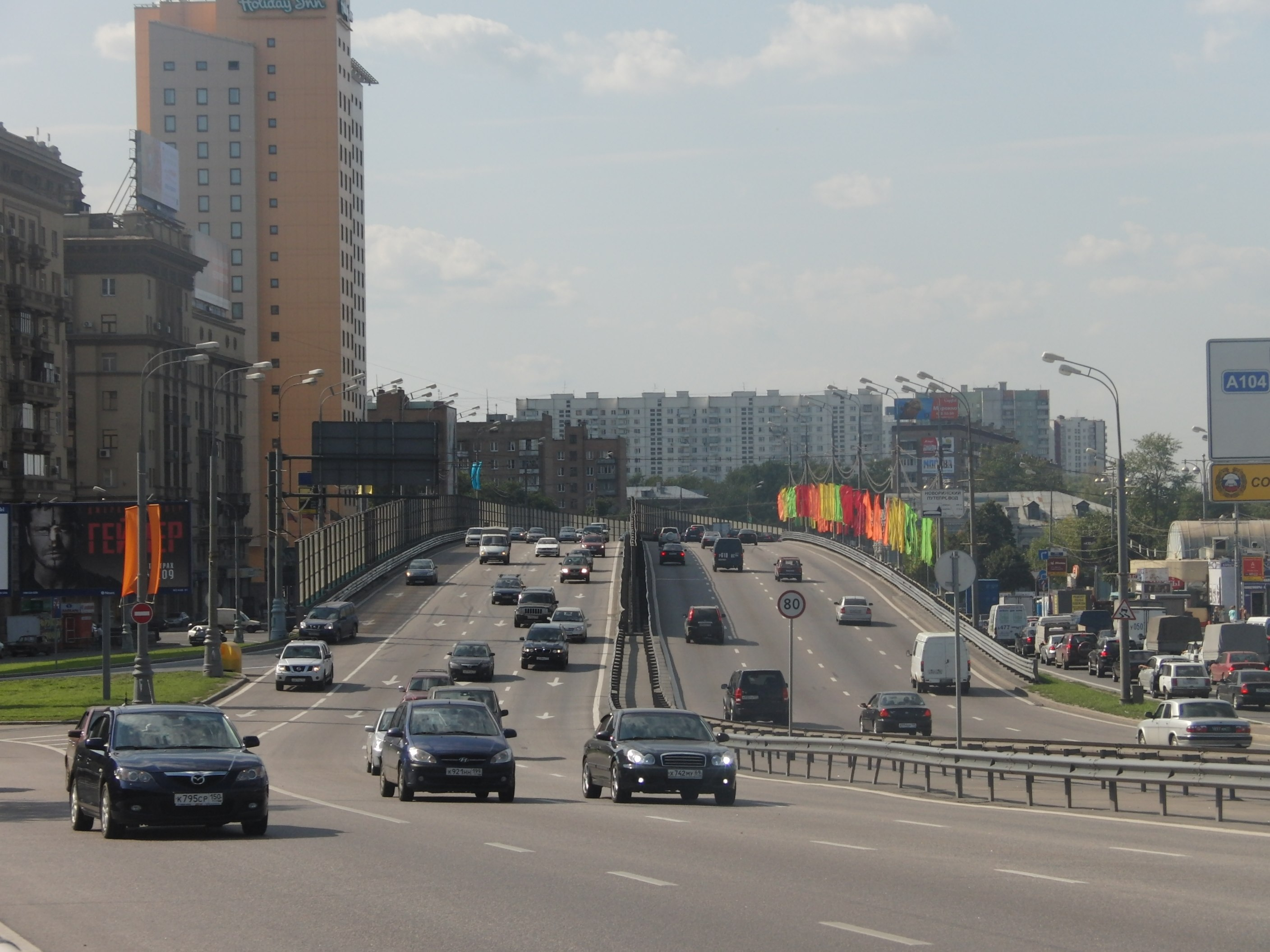
The Third Ring Road

== Municipal status ==
As a municipal division, it is incorporated as Maryina roshcha Municipal Okrug.

== Transportation ==
Moscow Metro had expanded the Lyublinskaya Line to Maryina Roshcha metro station on June 19, 2010. The district is also accessible via Savyolovskaya, Rizhskaya (south), and Alexeyevskaya (north) stations.

The Rizhsky railway station of the Moscow Railway is located in the district.

By 2022, the Maryina Roshcha station will be open as part of the Big Ring Metro Line.
