= Altufyevsky District =

Altufyevsky District Алтуфьевский район (Russian)
- District
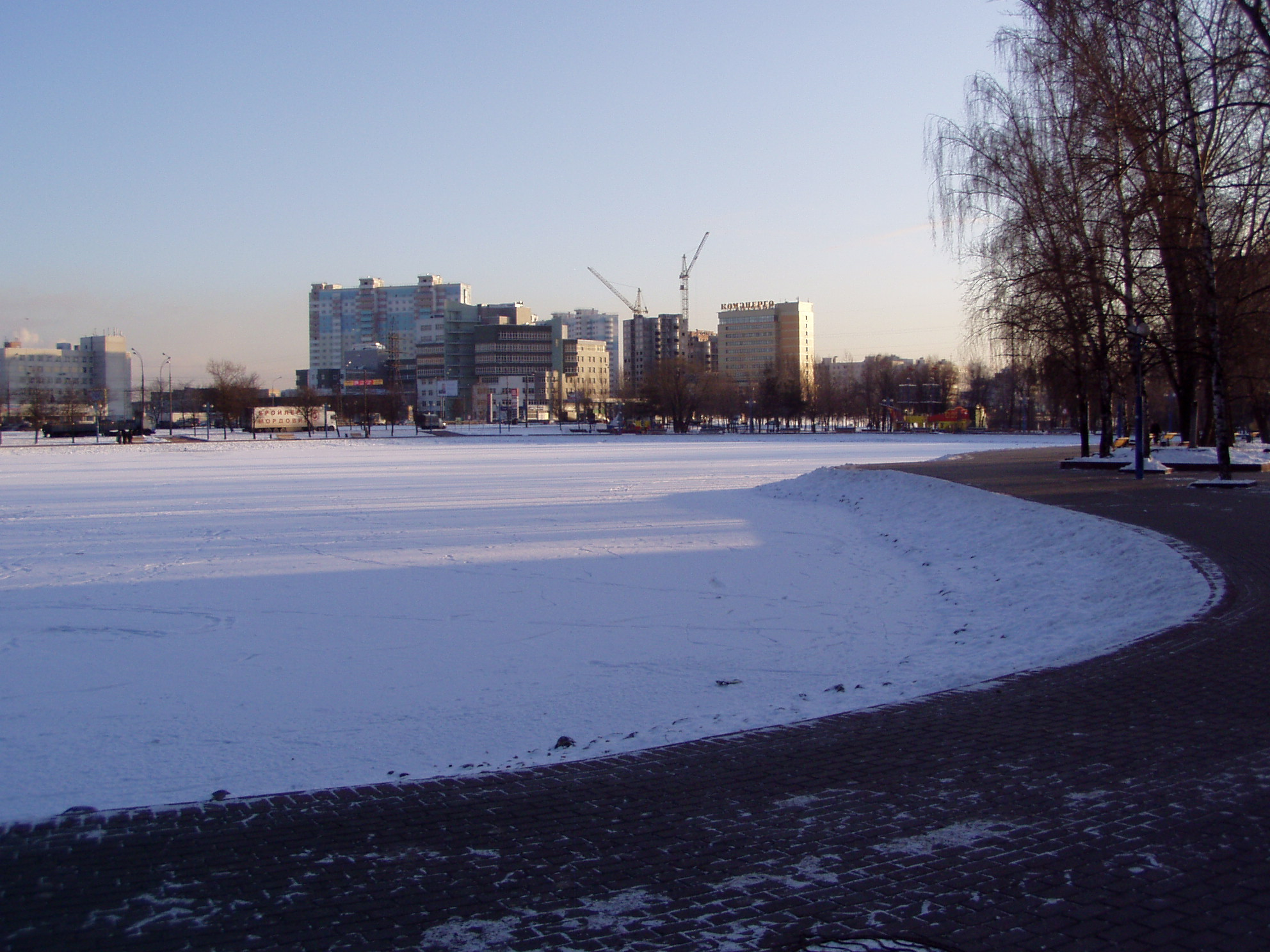
- Altufyevo pond in winter, Altufyevsky District

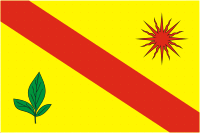
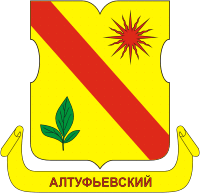
- Flag Coat of arms
- Location of Altufyevsky District on the map of Moscow
- Coordinates: 55°52′47″N 37°35′03″E
- Country: Russia
- Federal subject: Moscow
- Time zone: UTC+
- OKTMO ID: 45350000
- Website: http://uprava-altufevo.ru/

Altufyevsky District (Russian: Алтуфьевский район) is an administrative district (raion) of North-Eastern Administrative Okrug, and one of the 125 raions of Moscow, Russia.

== See also ==
- Administrative divisions of Moscow
