= 2009 Moscow City Duma election =

- 11 October 2009
- Turnout: 35.26%
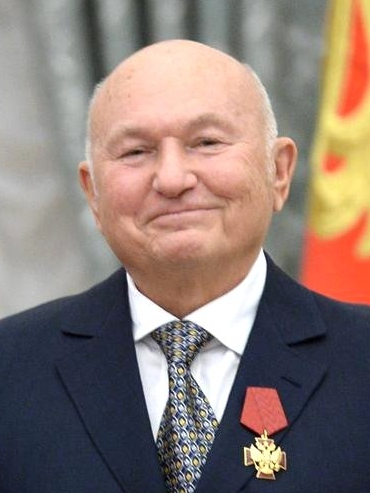

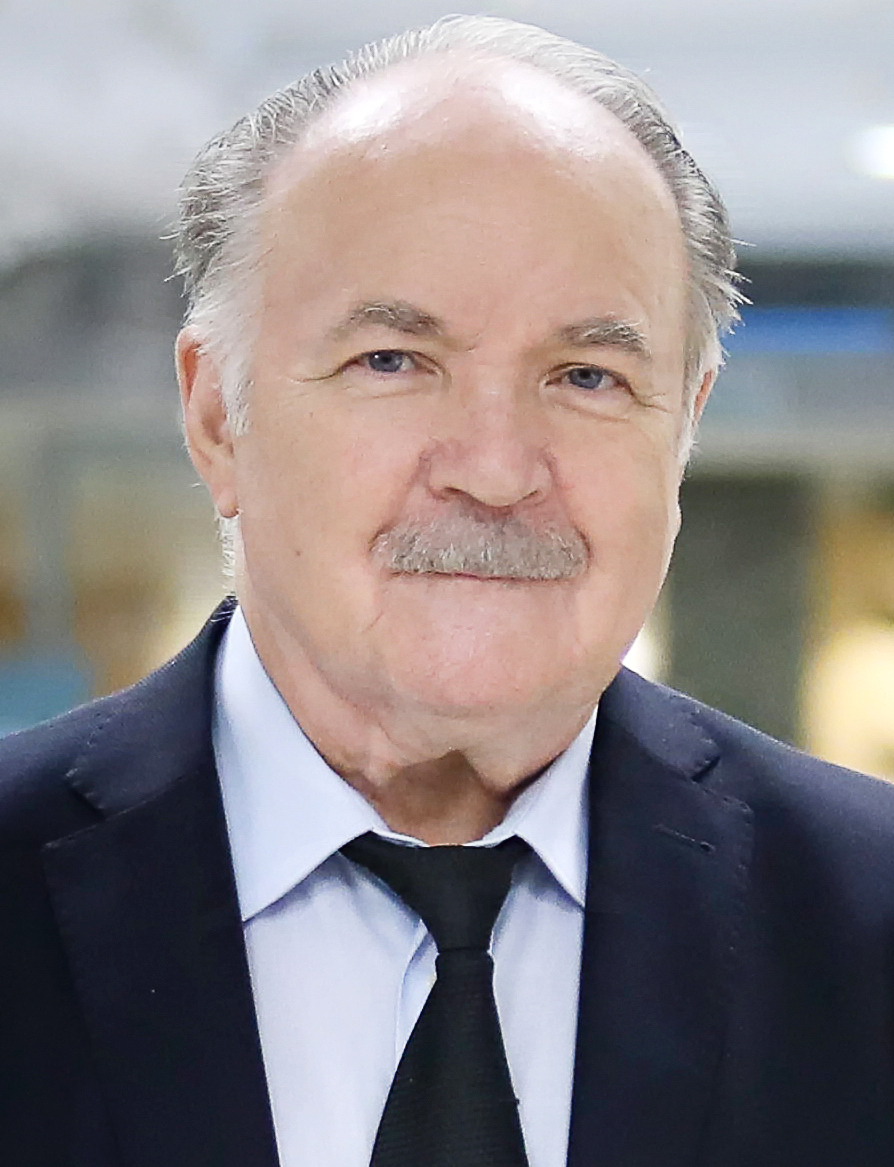

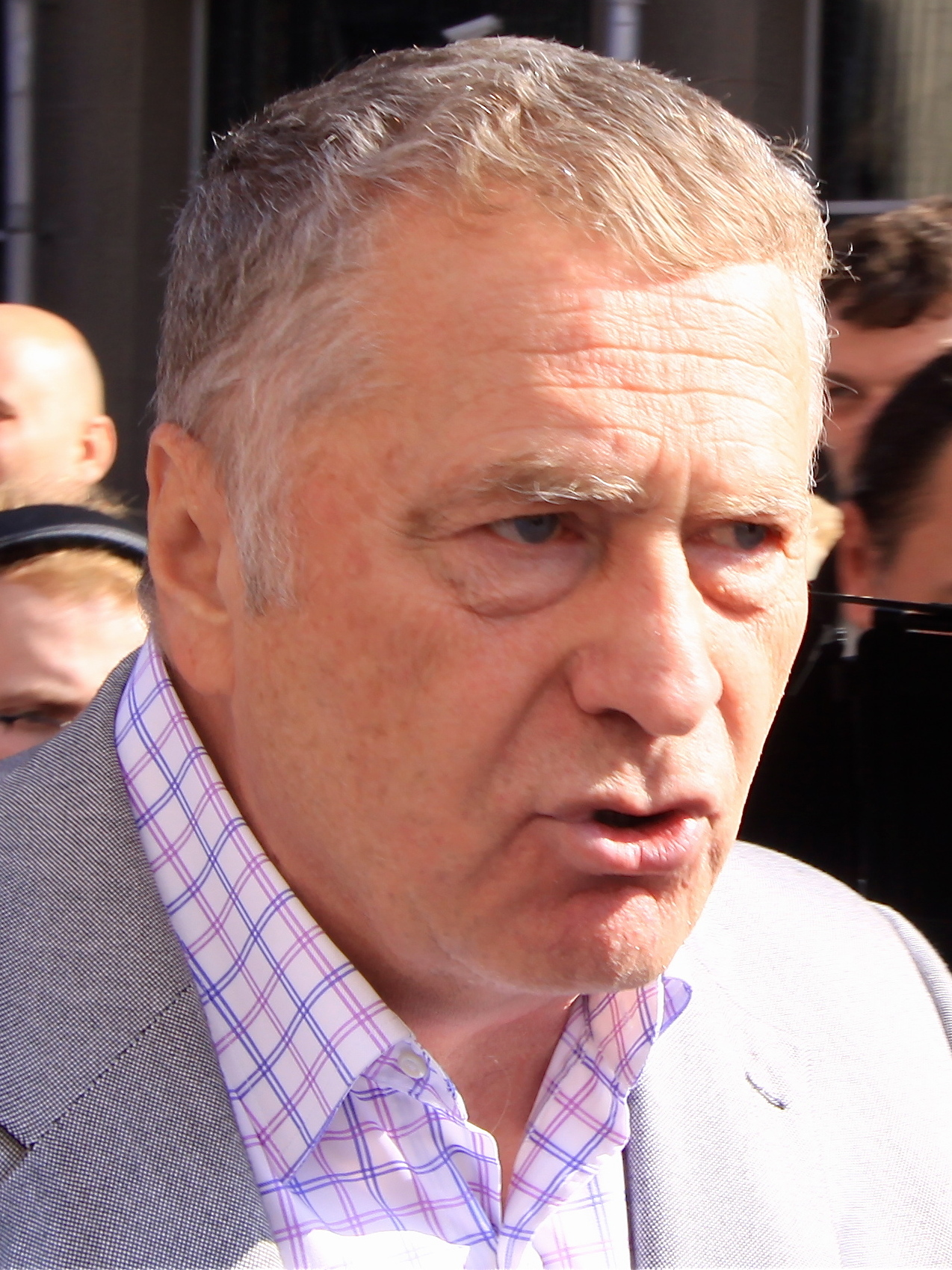

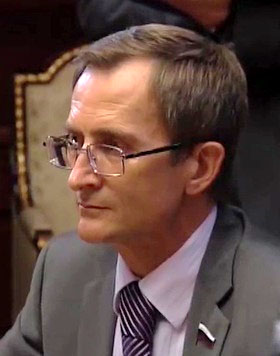
	First party	Second party
Leader	Yury Luzhkov	Nikolai Gubenko
Party	United Russia	CPRF
Last election	47.25%	16.75%
Seats won	32	3
Seat change	▲4	▼1
Popular vote	1,637,403	328,641
Percentage	66.25%	13.3%
Swing	▲19.0%	▼3.4%
	Third party	Fourth party
Leader	Vladimir Zhirinovsky	Nikolay Levichev
Party	LDPR	A Just Russia
Last election	8.00%	4.77% (Note: Russian Party of Life results in the previous election.)
Seats won	0	0
Seat change	Steady	Steady
Popular vote	151,498	131,842
Percentage	6.13%	5.33%
Swing	▼1.87%	▲0.56%

The elections for the 5th convocation of the Moscow City Duma took place on 11 October 2009. Out of the 35 deputies, 18 were elected through party lists using proportional representation, while the remaining 17 were elected from single-member constituencies. In order to secure seats in the City Duma through proportional representation, parties needed to surpass a 7% popular vote threshold. The term of office for the newly elected City Duma members is five years, which was extended from the previous four-year term.

== Background ==
The Moscow City Duma elections were announced for 11 October, following an announcement made on 8 July 2009. On 4 August 2009, the Government of Moscow issued a Decree outlining the organizational and logistical aspects of the election. Valery Vinogradov, the Deputy Mayor of Moscow, was entrusted with leading this effort.

Several parties participated in the elections, including United Russia, the Communist Party, Just Russia, Yabloko, the Liberal Democratic Party, the Right Cause, the Patriots of Russia, and Solidarity.

On 14 July, the Moscow city branch of the Communist Party held a conference and put forward a candidate. On the same day, the Liberal Democratic Party announced their first three candidates, although their pre-election conference took place on 3 August. The Patriots of Russia put forward their list on 27 July.

Yabloko and Right Cause engaged in negotiations to nominate a joint list. This initiative was proposed by Boris Titov, the co-chair of "Right Cause," who was willing to withdraw from his party to lead Yabloko's election list. However, the two other co-chairmen, Leonid Gozman and Georgy Bovt, called for independent participation of the party in the elections. On 22 July, Yabloko presented their list, while the Right Cause decided not to participate. However, the head of the Moscow branch, Igor Trunov, announced on 26 July that he would run as a self-nominated candidate in one of the single-member districts. Additionally, Boris Nadezhdin, a member of the Right Cause federal political council, along with Yelena Guseva and Sirazdin Ramazanov, members of the Moscow organization's political council, submitted documents for registration.

On 4 August 2009, the regional branch of the party "United Russia" held a conference in the city. The conference approved the list of deputies for the Moscow elections, which had been earlier approved on 29 July by the Presidium of the General Council of the party. According to Kommersant-Vlast magazine correspondents, the ruling party's election campaign did not begin in earnest until the end of that month, due to internal struggles between the federal and local leadership.

A Just Russia held its party conference on 5 August, during which they declared the head of their list for the city elections.

The Russian National Union attempted to present its own list, but it was not considered as the organization lacked the right to participate in the elections.

On 23 August, both Yabloko and the Patriots of Russia claimed to have collected the required number of signatures to register their lists.

== Results ==
Party performance per district

United Russia

Yabloko

Communist Party

LDPR
