= Bibirevo District =

Bibirevo District Бибирево (Russian)
- District
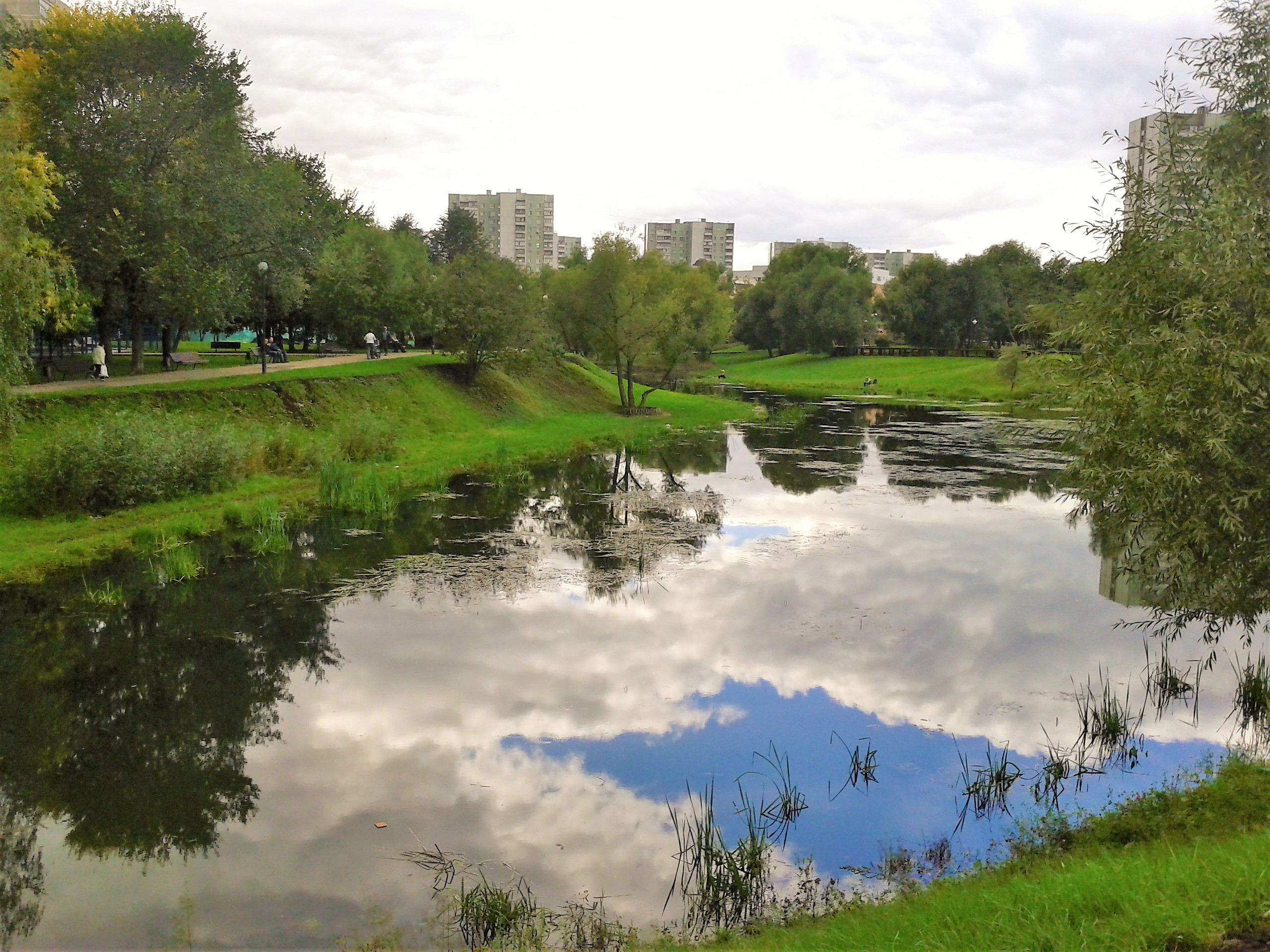
- River Chermyanka and the Bibirevo ethnographic village

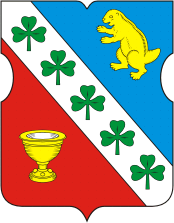
- Flag Coat of arms
- Location of Bibirevo District on the map of Moscow
- Coordinates: 55°53′30″N 37°37′00″E
- Country: Russia
- Federal subject: Moscow
- Time zone: UTC+
- OKTMO ID: 45352000
- Website: http://bibirevo.mos.ru/

Bibirevo District (Russian: район Бибирево) is an administrative district (raion) of North-Eastern Administrative Okrug near Moscow Ring Road, and one of the 125 raions of Moscow, Russia. The area of the district is 6.45 square kilometers (2.49 sq mi).

== History ==
The area is named after the village of Bibirevo, known to have existed since at least the end of the 16th century. Until 1774 the village and the lands around it belonged to the Ascension Convent, based Dmitry Donskoy and his wife Grand Duchess Eudoxia. The monastery was located on the territory of the Moscow Kremlin and in the summer nuns traveled to Bibirevo. In 1774 the village came under the jurisdiction of the State College of economy, and peasants became state owned.

The Church of St. Sergius of Radonezh was consecrated in 1894 in gratitude to God for the deliverance of the villagers from cholera. The temple was set flush with the wooden church of the Annunciation of the Virgin, known from the 16th century. In 1852 in the village there were 164 farmers, 36 yards, 1 church. In 1960 was included in the Dzerzhinsky district of Moscow. Since the late 1960s its territory was subject to mass housing construction. In 1967 Bibirevo became part of the Kirovsky Raion. In 1991, after the administrative reform of some of it became separate administrative unit bearing the same name, and some - to "Altufievskoe".

== Municipal status ==
As a municipal division, it is incorporated as Bibirevo Municipal Okrug.

== See also ==
- Administrative divisions of Moscow
