= North-Eastern Administrative Okrug =

North-Eastern Administrative Okrug Северо-Восточный административный округ
- Administrative okrug of Moscow
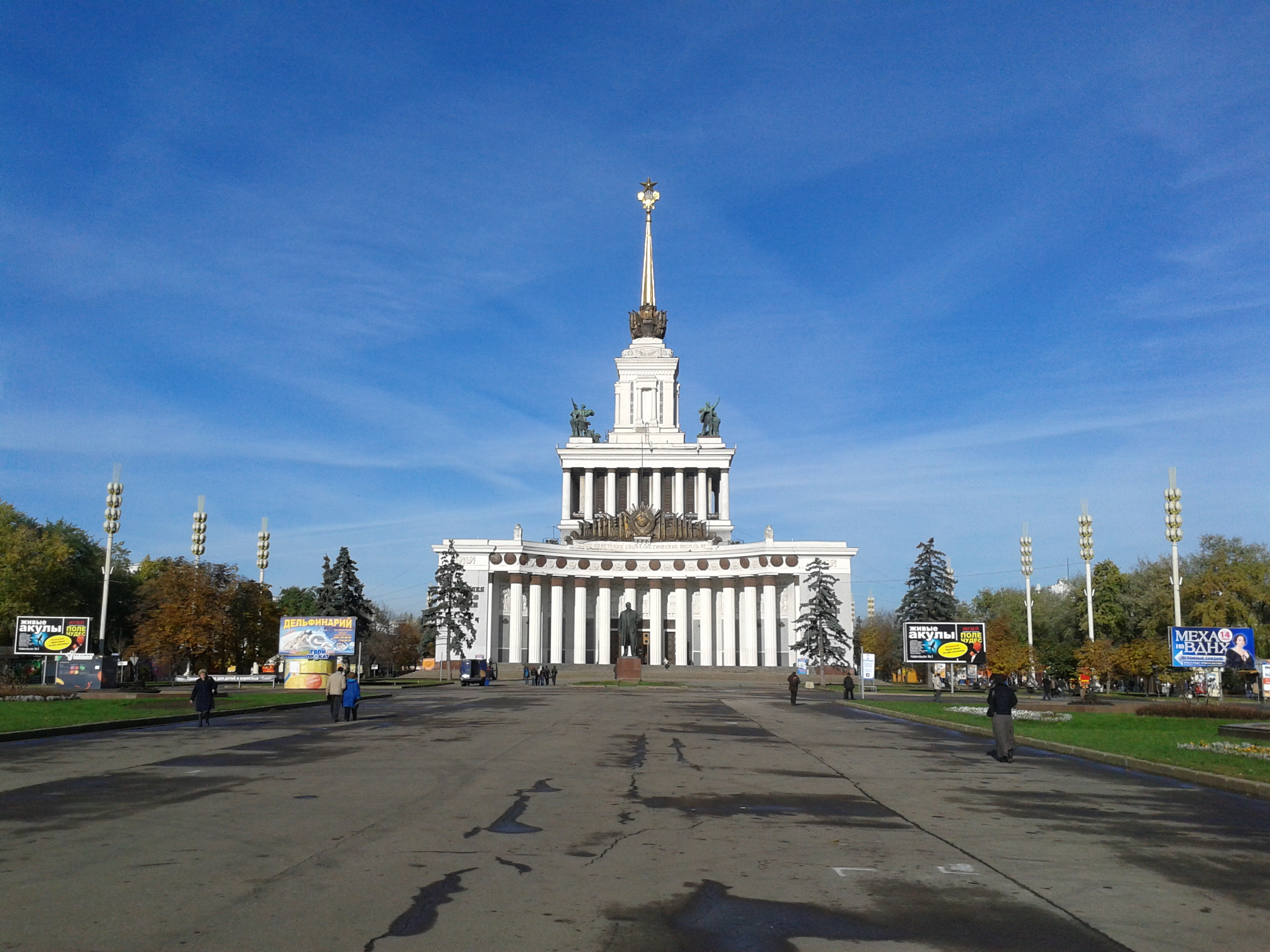
- Exhibition of Achievements of National Economy

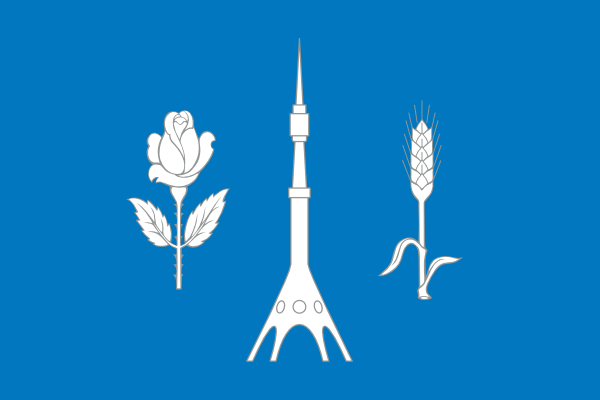
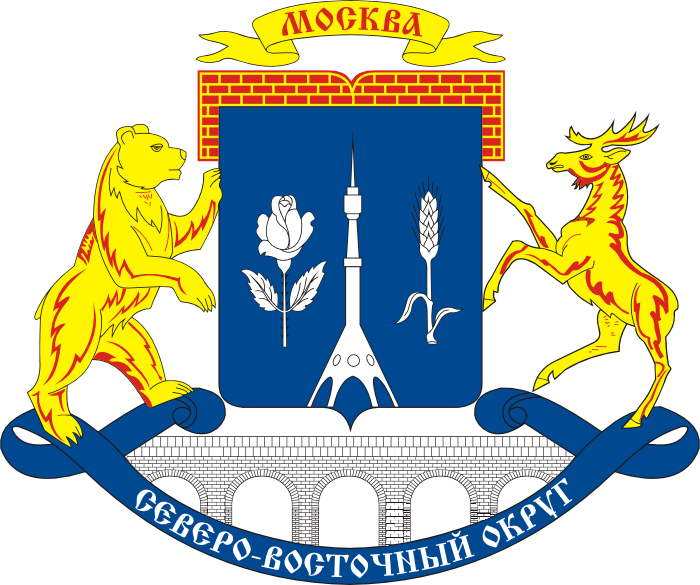
- Flag Coat of arms
- North-Eastern Administrative Okrug in Moscow
- Coordinates: 55°50′N 37°37′E
- Country: Russia
- Federal city: Moscow
- Established: July 10, 1991
- Districts: 13

Government
  - Prefect: Valery Vinogradov

Area
  - Total: 101.883 km^{2} (39.337 sq mi)

Population (2010 Census)
  - Total: 1,359,508
- Website: http://svao.mos.ru

North-Eastern Administrative Okrug (Russian: Се́веро-Восто́чный администрати́вный о́круг, romanized: Severo-Vostochny administrativny okrug), or Severo-Vostochny Administrative Okrug, is one of the twelve high-level territorial divisions (administrative okrugs) of the federal city of Moscow, Russia. As of the 2010 Census, its population was 1,359,508, up from 1,240,062 recorded during the 2002 Census.

== Territorial divisions ==
The administrative okrug comprises the following seventeen districts:

- Alexeyevsky
- Altufyevsky
- Babushkinsky
- Bibirevo
- Butyrsky
- Lianozovo
- Losinoostrovsky
- Marfino
- Maryina roshcha
- Ostankinsky
- Otradnoye
- Rostokino
- Severnoye Medvedkovo
- Severny
- Sviblovo
- Yaroslavsky
- Yuzhnoye Medvedkovo
