= Lyublino constituency =

Russian legislative constituency

Lyublino single-member constituency
- Constituency of the Russian State Duma

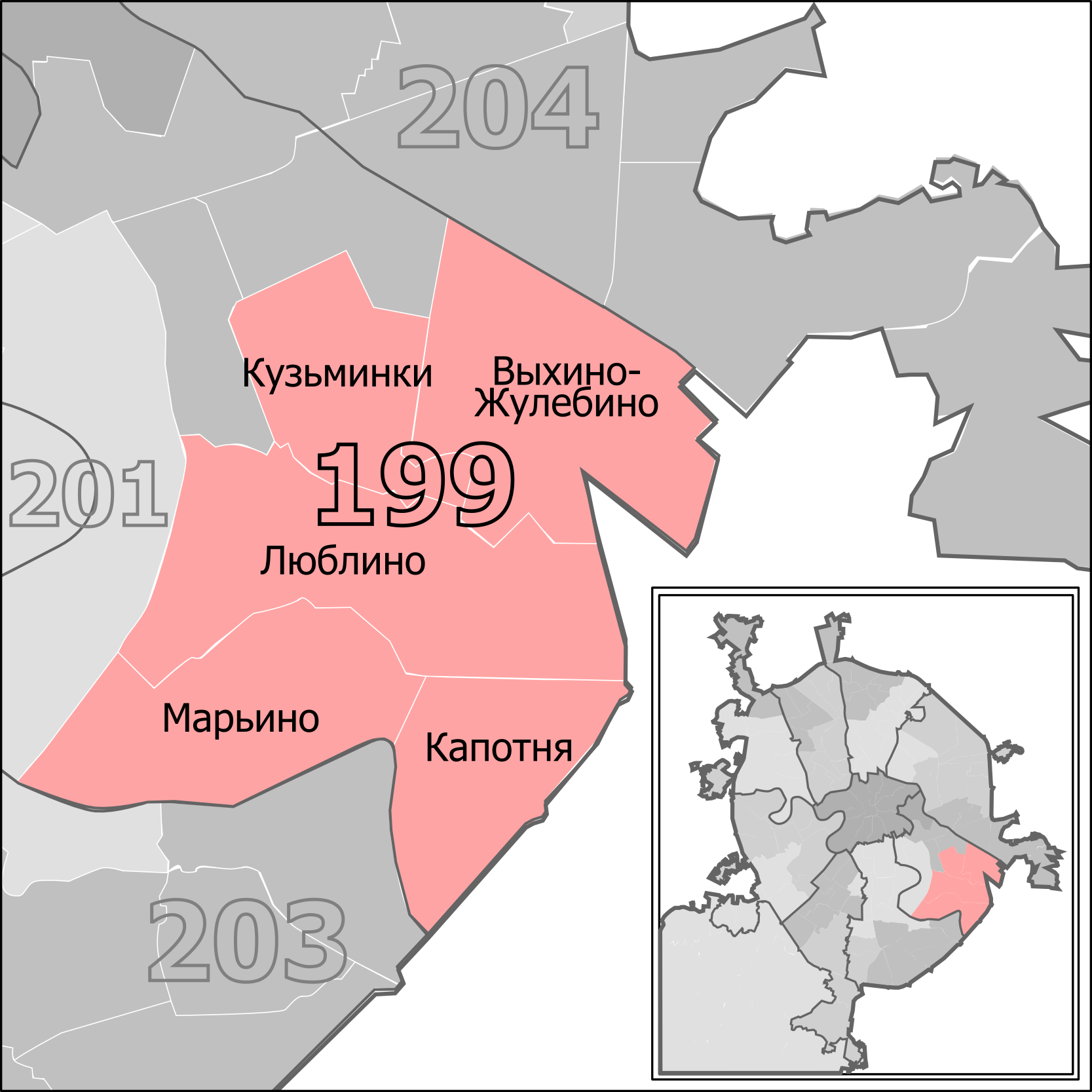
- Constituency boundaries since 2016
- Deputy: Pyotr Tolstoy; United Russia
- Federal subject: Moscow
- Districts: South-Eastern AO (Kapotnya, Kuzminki, Lyublino, Maryino, Vykhino-Zhulebino)
- Voters: 522,730 (2026)

The Lyublino constituency (No.198 (Note: No.205 South-Eastern constituency in 1993-1995, No.195 in 1995-2007, No.199 in 2016–2026)) is a Russian legislative constituency in Moscow. The constituency covers residential and industrial areas in outer South-Eastern Moscow.

The constituency has been represented since 2016 by United Russia deputy Pyotr Tolstoy, former journalist, TV host and executive, and member of the Tolstoy family. Tolstoy has chaired the Duma Committee on International Affairs since September 2026.

== Boundaries ==
1993–1995 South-Eastern constituency: South-Eastern Administrative Okrug (Kuzminki District, Lefortovo District, Nekrasovka District, Nizhegorodsky District, Ryazansky District, Tekstilshchiki District, Vykhino-Zhulebino District, Yuzhnoportovy District)
The constituency covered northern and eastern parts of South-Eastern Moscow, including the enclave of Nekrasovka.

1995–2003: South-Eastern Administrative Okrug (Kapotnya District, Kuzminki District, Lyublino District, Maryino District, Nekrasovka District, Ryazansky District, Tekstilshchiki District, Vykhino-Zhulebino District)
After the 1995 redistricting the constituency was renamed "Lyublino constituency" and gained Kapotnya, Lyublino and Maryino from the former Kashirsky constituency. This seat instead lost Lefortovo, Nizhegorodsky District and Yuzhnoportovy District to Avtozavodsky constituency.

2003–2007: South-Eastern Administrative Okrug (Kapotnya District, Kuzminki District, Lyublino District, Maryino District, Nekrasovka District, Vykhino-Zhulebino District)
The constituency was changed following the 2003 redistricting, losing Ryazansky District and Tekstilshchiki to Avtozavodsky constituency.

2016–present: South-Eastern Administrative Okrug (Kapotnya District, Kuzminki District, Lyublino District, Maryino District, Vykhino-Zhulebino District)
The constituency was re-created for the 2016 election and retained most of its former territory, losing Nekrasovka District to Perovo constituency.

== Members elected ==
| Election | Member | Party |
|---|---|---|
| 1993 | Boris Fyodorov (Note: in 1998 appointed as Director of State Taxation Service) | Choice of Russia |
| 1995 | Boris Fyodorov | Forward, Russia! |
| 1999 | Igor Lisinenko | Fatherland – All Russia |
| 2003 | Yelena Panina | United Russia |
| 2007 | Proportional representation - no election by constituency | |
| 2011 | Proportional representation - no election by constituency | |
| 2016 | Pyotr Tolstoy | United Russia |
| 2021 | Pyotr Tolstoy | United Russia |
| 2026 | Pyotr Tolstoy | United Russia |

== Election results ==
=== 1993 ===
Summary of the 12 December 1993 Russian legislative election in the South-Eastern constituency
| Candidate | Party | Votes | % |
|---|---|---|---|
| Boris Fyodorov | Choice of Russia | 55,019 | 23.83% |
| Vadim Artemyev | Independent | – | 13.13% |
| Vitaly Klyuchnikov | Independent | – | – |
| Vladislav Litvinov | Independent | – | – |
| Georgy Lukava | Liberal Democratic Party | – | – |
| Aleksandr Manshin | Kedr | – | – |
| Yury Serov | Independent | – | – |
| Lev Tsarevsky | Democratic Party | – | – |
| Aleksandr Zaytsev | Communist Party | – | – |
| Total | | 230,834 | 100% |

=== 1995 ===
Summary of the 17 December 1995 Russian legislative election in the Lyublino constituency
| Candidate | Party | Votes | % |
|---|---|---|---|
| Boris Fyodorov (incumbent) | Forward, Russia! | 70,472 | 24.27% |
| Sergey Kurochkin | Party of Economic Freedom | 36,127 | 12.44% |
| Vladimir Kostyuchenko | For the Motherland! | 28,183 | 9.70% |
| Yury Nazarov | Communist Party | 27,067 | 9.32% |
| Klara Luchko | Agrarian Party | 17,591 | 6.06% |
| Valery Lysenko | Pamfilova–Gurov–Lysenko | 15,222 | 5.24% |
| Igor Petrenko | Independent | 12,493 | 4.30% |
| Sergey Maslennikov | Independent | 10,686 | 3.68% |
| Viktor Vdovin | Trade Unions and Industrialists – Union of Labour | 8,072 | 2.78% |
| Vasily Galepa | Communists and Working Russia - for the Soviet Union | 5,856 | 2.02% |
| Sergey Plekhanov | Liberal Democratic Party | 5,213 | 1.80% |
| Tamara Samartseva | Derzhava | 4,171 | 1.44% |
| Dmitry Biryukov | Revival | 3,388 | 1.17% |
| Valery Pashintsev | Independent | 2,848 | 0.98% |
| against all | | 35,886 | 12.36% |
| Total | | 290,397 | 100% |

=== 1998 ===
The results of the by-election were invalidated due to low turnout (24.2%), another by-election was not scheduled as 1999 federal election was due to be held in less than a year.

Summary of the 6 December 1998 by-election in the Lyublino constituency
| Candidate | Party | Votes | % |
|---|---|---|---|
| Pavel Voshchanov | Independent | 33,072 | 26.21% |
| Igor Lisinenko | Independent | 23,578 | 17% |
| Martin Shakkum | Independent | 20,759 | 16.45% |
| Aleksandr Akimov | Independent | – | – |
| Aleksey Aleksandrov | Independent | – | – |
| Mikhail Fomichev | Independent | – | – |
| Vladlen Gotsiridze | Independent | – | – |
| Yelena Litvinenko | Independent | – | – |
| Lev L. Markov | Independent | – | – |
| Lev N. Markov | Independent | – | – |
| Sergey Rakshun | Independent | – | – |
| Oleg Sotnikov | Independent | – | – |
| Sergey Troitsky | Independent | – | – |
| Edvard Zhuk | Independent | – | – |
| Total | | 126,181 | 100% |

=== 1999 ===
Summary of the 19 December 1999 Russian legislative election in the Lyublino constituency
| Candidate | Party | Votes | % |
|---|---|---|---|
| Igor Lisinenko | Fatherland – All Russia | 101,131 | 29.66% |
| Nikolay Leonov | Russian All-People's Union | 46,406 | 13.61% |
| Yelena Panina | Independent | 41,733 | 12.24% |
| Pavel Voshchanov | Yabloko | 38,606 | 11.32% |
| Aleksey Aleksandrov | Independent | 25,327 | 7.43% |
| Vilenina Golitsyna | Liberal Democratic Party | 5,788 | 1.70% |
| Lilia Adarcheva | Independent | 5,473 | 1.61% |
| Aleksey Nosov | Movement in Support of the Army | 5,400 | 1.58% |
| Mikhail Ilyin | Independent | 4,895 | 1.44% |
| Anatoly Vedenin | Andrey Nikolayev and Svyatoslav Fyodorov Bloc | 4,489 | 1.32% |
| Vladimir Ozhogov | Congress of Russian Communities-Yury Boldyrev Movement | 3,739 | 1.10% |
| Vyacheslav Makarov | Spiritual Heritage | 1,835 | 0.54% |
| against all | | 46,650 | 13.68% |
| Total | | 340,947 | 100% |

=== 2003 ===
Summary of the 7 December 2003 Russian legislative election in the Lyublino constituency
| Candidate | Party | Votes | % |
|---|---|---|---|
| Yelena Panina | United Russia | 103,160 | 38.32% |
| Boris Fyodorov | New Course — Automobile Russia | 35,309 | 13.12% |
| Aleksandr Shabalov | Party of Russia's Rebirth-Russian Party of Life | 27,838 | 10.34% |
| Yury Politukhin | Communist Party | 15,907 | 5.91% |
| Vyacheslav Igrunov | Union of People for Education and Science | 12,286 | 4.56% |
| Yury Kokarev | Independent | 6,722 | 2.50% |
| Sergey Abeltsev | Liberal Democratic Party | 5,292 | 1.97% |
| Andrey Priyatkin | Independent | 2,693 | 1.00% |
| against all | | 52,986 | 19.68% |
| Total | | 270,744 | 100% |

=== 2016 ===
Summary of the 18 September 2016 Russian legislative election in the Lyublino constituency
| Candidate | Party | Votes | % |
|---|---|---|---|
| Pyotr Tolstoy | United Russia | 82,346 | 49.07% |
| Valery Rashkin | Communist Party | 20,979 | 12.50% |
| Valery Kozadayev | Liberal Democratic Party | 12,052 | 7.18% |
| Valery Katkov | A Just Russia | 11,436 | 6.81% |
| Vladimir Semago | Yabloko | 8,892 | 5.30% |
| Vladimir Markin | Patriots of Russia | 5,946 | 3.54% |
| Fyodor Biryukov | Rodina | 5,697 | 3.39% |
| Dmitry Kachanovsky | People's Freedom Party | 4,428 | 2.64% |
| Aleksandr Kuvayev | Communists of Russia | 4,343 | 2.59% |
| Mikhail Dolmatov | Party of Growth | 4,041 | 2.41% |
| Aleksandr Kachanov | Civic Platform | 1,772 | 1.06% |
| Mikhail Kozulin | Civilian Power | 613 | 0.37% |
| Total | | 167,818 | 100% |

=== 2021 ===
Summary of the 17-19 September 2021 Russian legislative election in the Lyublino constituency
| Candidate | Party | Votes | % |
|---|---|---|---|
| Pyotr Tolstoy (incumbent) | United Russia | 115,457 | 45.91% |
| Yelena Gulicheva | Communist Party | 49,472 | 19.67% |
| Maria Prokhorenkova | New People | 12,801 | 5.09% |
| Ivan Kulnev | A Just Russia — For Truth | 12,080 | 4.80% |
| Valery Rashkin | Communists of Russia | 10,343 | 4.11% |
| Anna Balykova | Party of Pensioners | 8,985 | 3.57% |
| Andrey Shakh | Liberal Democratic Party | 8,786 | 3.49% |
| Valery Katkov | Party of Growth | 7,722 | 3.07% |
| Vladimir Badmayev | Russian Party of Freedom and Justice | 6,204 | 2.47% |
| Roman Kisilyov | Yabloko | 5,826 | 2.32% |
| Samson Sholademi | The Greens | 4,533 | 1.80% |
| Zinaida Gulina | Green Alternative | 3,059 | 1.22% |
| Denis Tarasov | Civic Platform | 2,434 | 0.97% |
| Total | | 251,499 | 100% |

=== 2026 ===
Summary of the 18-20 September 2026 Russian legislative election in the Lyublino constituency
| Candidate | Party | Votes | % |
|---|---|---|---|
| Pyotr Tolstoy (incumbent) | United Russia | 152,484 | 55.35% |
| Konstantin Mineyev | New People | 29,255 | 10.62% |
| Artyom Snegovsky | Yabloko | 26,803 | 9.73% |
| Anton Zhmakin | Communist Party | 22,800 | 8.28% |
| Sergey Bagyan | Liberal Democratic Party | 19,912 | 7.23% |
| Yury Nabiyev | A Just Russia | 14,636 | 5.31% |
| Ivan Zharov | Communists of Russia | 9,007 | 3.27% |
| Total | | 275,481 | 100% |
