= Nagatinsky constituency =

Russian legislative constituency

Nagatinsky single-member constituency
- Constituency of the Russian State Duma

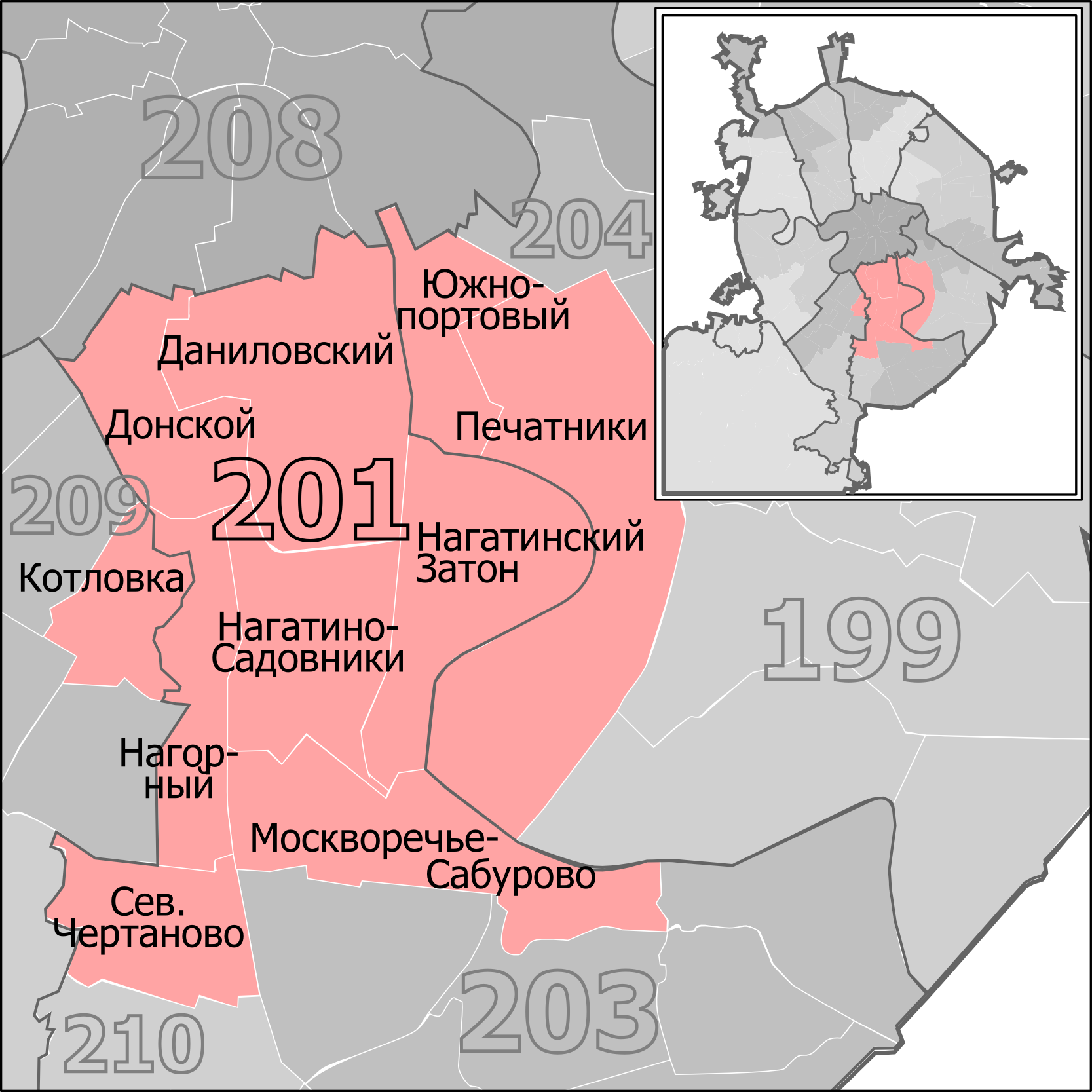
- Constituency boundaries since 2016
- Deputy: Svetlana Razvorotneva; United Russia
- Federal subject: Moscow
- Districts: South-Eastern AO (Pechatniki, Yuzhnoportovy), South-Western AO (Kotlovka), Southern AO (Chertanovo Severnoye, Danilovsky, Donskoy, Moskvorechye-Saburovo, Nagatino-Sadovniki, Nagatinsky Zaton, Nagorny)
- Voters: 491,167 (2026)

The Nagatinsky constituency (No.200 (Note: No.196 in 1993-1995, Avtozavodsky constituency No.191 in 1995-2007, No.201 in 2016–2026)) is a Russian legislative constituency in Moscow. The constituency covers inner parts of Southern, South-Western and South-Eastern Moscow.

The constituency has been represented since 2021 by United Russia deputy Svetlana Razvorotneva, former Member of Civic Chamber of the Russian Federation and housing advocate, who won the open seat, succeeding five-term United Russia incumbent Yelena Panina.

== Boundaries ==
1993–1995: Central Administrative Okrug (Yakimanka District, Zamoskvorechye District), Southern Administrative Okrug (Biryulyovo Vostochnoye District, Biryulyovo Zapadnoye District, Danilovsky District, Donskoy District, Moskvorechye-Saburovo District, Nagatino-Sadovniki District, Nagatinsky Zaton District, Tsaritsyno District, Zagorodny District (Note: merged with Donskoy District in 1995))
The constituency stretched from southern parts of Central Moscow through half of the city to Biryulyovo Vostochnoye and Biryulyovo Zapadnoye in Southern Moscow.

1995–2003 Avtozavodsky constituency: Central Administrative Okrug (Tagansky District), South-Eastern Administrative Okrug (Lefortovo District, Nizhegorodsky District, Pechatniki District, Yuzhnoportovy District), Southern Administrative Okrug (Danilovsky District, Donskoy District, Nagatino-Sadovniki District, Nagatinsky Zaton District)
After the 1995 redistricting the constituency was significantly altered and renamed "Avtozavodsky constituency", losing Yakimanka and Zamoskvorechye to Central constituency, Biryulyovo Vostochnoye, Moskvorechye-Saburovo and Tsaritsyno – to Orekhovo–Borisovo constituency, and Biryulyovo Zapadnoye – to Chertanovo constituency. This seat was pushed to the east, gaining South-Eastern Moscow districts Lefortovo, Nizhegorodsky District and Yuzhnoportovy District from the former South-Eastern constituency, as well as Pechatniki from the former Kashirsky constituency.

2003–2007 Avtozavodsky constituency: South-Eastern Administrative Okrug (Lefortovo District, Nizhegorodsky District, Pechatniki District, Ryazansky District, Tekstilshchiki District, Yuzhnoportovy District), Southern Administrative Okrug (Danilovsky District, Donskoy District, Nagatino-Sadovniki District, Nagatinsky Zaton District)
The constituency was changed following the 2003 redistricting, losing Tagansky District to Central constituency. This seat was pushed further to the east, gaining Ryazansky District and Tekstilshchiki from Lyublino constituency.

2016–present: South-Eastern Administrative Okrug (Pechatniki District, Yuzhnoportovy District), South-Western Administrative Okrug (Kotlovka District), Southern Administrative Okrug (Chertanovo Severnoye District, Danilovsky District, Donskoy District, Moskvorechye-Saburovo District, Nagatino-Sadovniki District, Nagatinsky Zaton District, Nagorny District)
The constituency was re-created for the 2016 election under the name "Nagatinsky constituency" and retained most of its former territory, losing Lefortovo to Central constituency as well as Nizhegorodsky District, Ryazansky District and Tekstilshchiki – to Perovo constituency. This seat was instead stretched to the west, gaining Kotlovka, Nagorny District and Chertanovo Severnoye from Chertanovo constituency.

== Members elected ==
Election	Member	Party
1993	Andrey Volkov	Independent
1995	Eduard Vorobyov	Democratic Choice of Russia – United Democrats
1999	Valery Draganov (Note: in 2006 appointed deputy general director of Rusal)	Fatherland – All Russia
2003	Valery Draganov	United Russia
2007	Proportional representation - no election by constituency	
2011	Proportional representation - no election by constituency	
2016	Yelena Panina	United Russia
2021	Svetlana Razvorotneva	United Russia
2026	Svetlana Razvorotneva	United Russia

== Election results ==
=== 1993 ===
Summary of the 12 December 1993 Russian legislative election in the Nagatinsky constituency
Candidate	Party	Votes	%
Andrey Volkov	Independent	44,861	17.68%
Lev Ponomaryov	Choice of Russia	37,818	14.90%
Vasily Shishkarev	Communist Party	22,821	8.99%
Vladimir Belyayev	Yavlinky–Boldyrev–Lukin	17,208	6.78%
Andrey Golovin	Independent	15,631	6.16%
Yury Solomatin	Party of Russian Unity and Accord	13,865	5.46%
Igor Pisarev	Kedr	13,049	5.14%
Vitaly Zhuravlev	Liberal Democratic Party	7,495	2.95%
Sergey Borodychev	Future of Russia–New Names	6,180	2.44%
Vladimir Sotnichenko	Independent	4,930	1.94%
Yevgeny Butov	Independent	3,896	1.54%
against all		50,042	19.72%
Total		253,742	100%

=== 1995 ===
Summary of the 17 December 1995 Russian legislative election in the Avtozavodsky constituency
Candidate	Party	Votes	%
Eduard Vorobyov	Democratic Choice of Russia – United Democrats	67,435	22.43%
Vadim Artemyev	Independent	50,374	16.76%
Yevgenia Dudko	Communist Party	35,399	11.77%
Andrey Golovin	Stanislav Govorukhin Bloc	21,860	7.27%
Vyacheslav Zubenko	Congress of Russian Communities	12,093	4.02%
Aleksandr Koryev	Forward, Russia!	11,346	3.77%
Vladimir Kiselev	Agrarian Party	6,970	2.32%
Aleksey Groza	Liberal Democratic Party	6,518	2.17%
Yury Palchikov	Ivan Rybkin Bloc	6,496	2.16%
Nikolay Nadysev	Independent	6,392	2.12%
Yelena Mavrodi	Independent	4,970	1.65%
Viktor Nesterov	Russian All-People's Movement	4,734	1.57%
Sergey Kondratenko	Independent	3,371	1.12%
Vyacheslav Poplavsky	Front of National Salvation	2,246	0.75%
Oleg Sokolov	Social Democrats	1,881	0.63%
against all		51,190	17.03%
Total		300,637	100%

=== 1999 ===
Summary of the 19 December 1999 Russian legislative election in the Avtozavodsky constituency
Candidate	Party	Votes	%
Valery Draganov	Fatherland – All Russia	88,181	29.80%
Eduard Vorobyov (incumbent)	Union of Right Forces	42,307	14.30%
Valery Saykin	Communist Party	30,648	10.36%
Yury Bryntsalov	Russian Socialist Party	25,587	8.65%
Gennady Anichkin	Independent	19,260	6.51%
Olga Serebryannikova	Congress of Russian Communities-Yury Boldyrev Movement	10,929	3.69%
Yelena Veduta	Independent	9,819	3.32%
Oleg Kasko	Liberal Democratic Party	5,654	1.91%
Vadim Burkovsky	Independent	4,618	1.56%
against all		49,874	16.85%
Total		295,917	100%

=== 2003 ===
Summary of the 7 December 2003 Russian legislative election in the Avtozavodsky constituency
Candidate	Party	Votes	%
Valery Draganov (incumbent)	United Russia	104,467	37.55%
Nikolay Moskovchenko	Rodina	35,568	12.78%
Sergey Gorodilin	Union of Right Forces	26,290	9.45%
Aleksandr Kozlov	Communist Party	21,324	7.66%
Nadezhda Novichikhina	Party of Russia's Rebirth-Russian Party of Life	13,429	4.83%
Yury Kaminsky	Liberal Democratic Party	12,204	4.39%
against all		58,143	20.90%
Total		280,374	100%

=== 2016 ===
Summary of the 18 September 2016 Russian legislative election in the Nagatinsky constituency
Candidate	Party	Votes	%
Yelena Panina	United Russia	70,518	40.23%
Kirill Goncharov	Yabloko	19,390	11.06%
Vladimir Svyatoshenko	Communist Party	18,226	10.40%
Dmitry Nikolayev	Liberal Democratic Party	14,262	8.14%
Andrey Nagibin	A Just Russia	10,058	5.74%
Natalya Mikhalchenko	People's Freedom Party	7,812	4.46%
Yulia Zhandarova	The Greens	7,534	4.30%
Georgy Fyodorov	Rodina	6,866	3.92%
Valery Smirnov	Patriots of Russia	6,804	3.88%
Vladimir Strukov	Communists of Russia	4,393	2.51%
Iosif Dzhagayev	Party of Growth	3,887	2.22%
Total		175,290	100%

=== 2021 ===
Results by district: Svetlana Razvorotneva: 30–40% 40–50%; Anastasia Udaltsova: 30–40%

Summary of the 17-19 September 2021 Russian legislative election in the Nagatinsky constituency
Candidate	Party	Votes	%
Svetlana Razvorotneva	United Russia	81,664	35.72%
Anastasia Udaltsova	Communist Party	57,840	25.30%
Aleksey Demin	New People	21,758	9.52%
Armen Gasparyan	A Just Russia — For Truth	16,785	7.34%
Vladimir Bernev	Liberal Democratic Party	13,802	6.04%
Gleb Tumanov	Yabloko	8,736	3.82%
Anna Udalova	Communists of Russia	8,844	3.87%
Denis Kulikov	Russian Party of Freedom and Justice	6,867	3.00%
Stanislav Chernikov	Party of Growth	3,586	1.57%
Nazirzhon Abduganiyev	Green Alternative	3,215	1.41%
Total		228,597	100%

=== 2026 ===
Summary of the 18-20 September 2026 Russian legislative election in the Nagatinsky constituency
Candidate	Party	Votes	%
Svetlana Razvorotneva (incumbent)	United Russia	107,867	42.66%
Mikhail Delyagin	A Just Russia	29,766	11.77%
Ivan Sitnikov	New People	29,232	11.56%
German Chunikhin	Yabloko	25,534	10.10%
Dmitry Bondar	Liberal Democratic Party	23,205	9.18%
Aleksey Goloborodko	Communist Party	20,544	8.13%
Vladimir Berdyayev	Communists of Russia	11,123	4.40%
Vadim Yurov	Party of Direct Democracy	4,834	1.91%
Total		252,849	100%
