= Lyublino Park =

Park in Moscow, Russia

Coordinates: 55.689°N 37.747°E

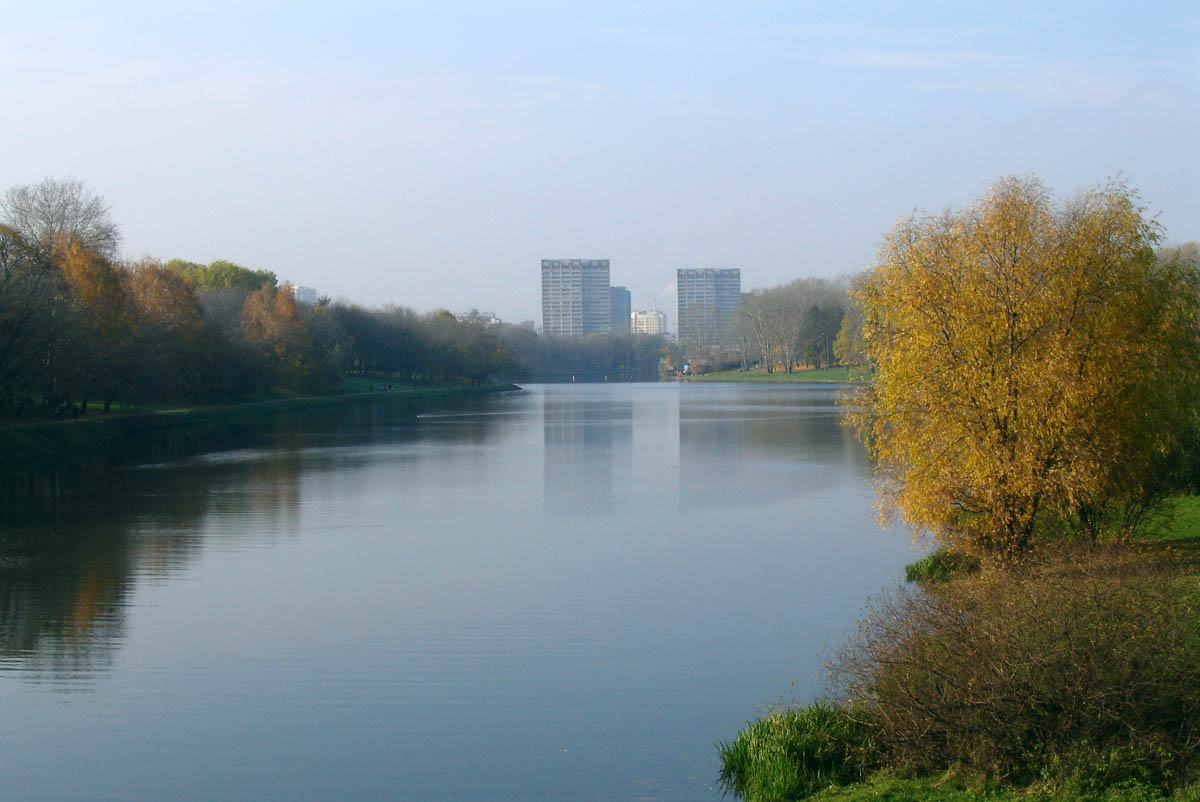
- Ponds in Lyublino Park
- Interactive map of Lyublino Park
- Location: Lyublino, Moscow, Russia
- Created: the beginning of the 19th century
- Status: Open all year

Lyublino Park (Russian: Люблинский парк) is a park in Lyublino and Tesktilshchiki districts of Moscow, a part of a recreational complex "Kuzminki-Lyublino". It is located around Lyublino pond on Churiliha river. The park consists of two parts, divided by Krasnodonskaya street.

The park was created in the beginning of 19th century as an English garden of N.A.Durasov's estate.

== Transport ==
Two exits of Volzhskaya metro station are located at the park's territory.

== See also ==
- Lyublino
- Tesktilshchiki
