= Volkov Russian State Academic Theatre =

- Российский театр драмы имени Ф. Волкова
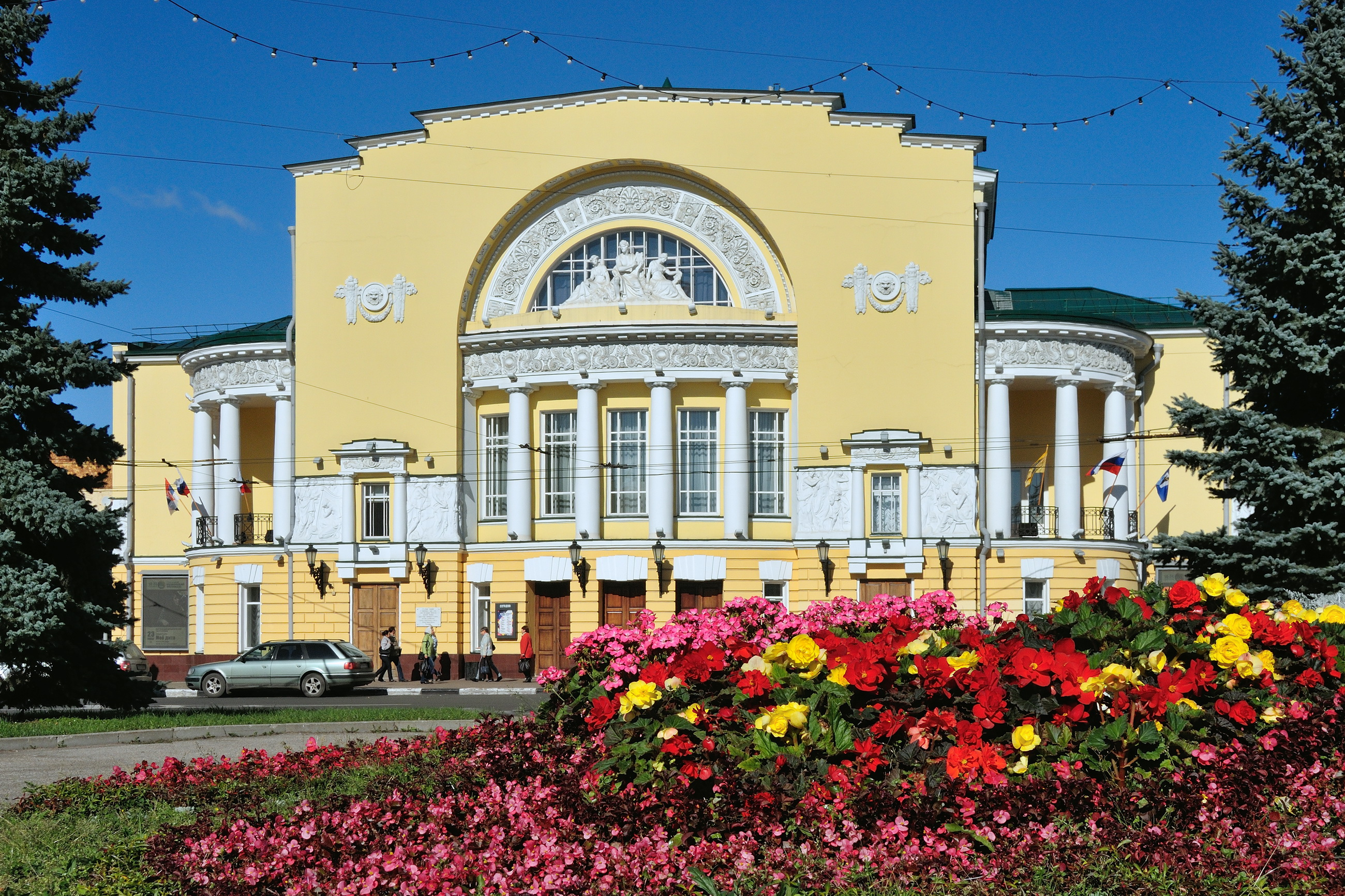
- Interactive map of Volkov Russian State Academic Theatre
- Address: Yaroslavl; Russia
- Coordinates: 57°37′37″N 39°53′04″E
- Type: Repertory theatre

Construction
- Opened: 1756

Website
- https://volkovteatr.ru/english/

Volkov Russian State Academic Theatre (Russian: Российский театр драмы имени Ф. Волкова) is the oldest drama theatre in Russia. It was founded in 1756. The building is located in the centre of Yaroslavl at 1 Volkov Square.

== History ==
The history of the Volkov Theatre goes back to a tannery, where, according to legend, two and a half centuries ago the young son of a Kostroma merchant, Fyodor Grigoryevich Volkov, began to stage theatrical performances in Yaroslavl with his brothers and friends. The first of these took place on July 10, 1750, in the tannery of Fyodor's stepfather, the merchant Polushkin – it was Jean Racine's Esther, translated by Fyodor Volkov. A special theatre building ("theatrical chamber") opened on Nikolskaya Street on January 7, 1751, with A. P. Sumarokov's tragedy Khorev, costumes and scenery were made; a permanent repertoire was formed. Word of the young Yaroslavl people reached Empress Elizabeth Petrovna, who in January 1752 summoned them to Saint Petersburg by a special decree. Since then, the founder of the theatre never returned to Yaroslavl.

After Volkov left for Saint Petersburg in 1752, the Yaroslavl Theatre he had founded continued its activities. The theatre was managed by Fyodor's brothers, Alexei and Gavriil, but apparently financial reasons and the lack of organizational talent did not allow the brothers to consolidate the work started by Fyodor. Since 1756, the theatre ceased to exist. The theatre building has not survived, apparently becoming a victim of a large city fire.

In 1909, a competition was announced for the best design for a new theater building; the competition was won by architect Nikolai Spirin (with a design entitled "Dancing in a Circle" in imitation of the Gilardi Pavilion in Kuzminki). The building was constructed in 1911, and the Volkov Theater is still located there today. That same year, the theater was named after Volkov. In October 1918, the theater was municipalized.

=== Soviet period ===
During the Soviet era, the Volkov Theater also gained fame as one of the best in the provinces. Its heyday can be considered the 1960s to 1970s, when the artistic director of the theater was the outstanding director, People's Artist of the USSR, laureate of the State Prizes Firs Efimovich Shishigin. By this time, the theater had formed a very strong group which included People's Artists of the USSR and the RSFSR Alexandra Chudinova, Klara Nezvanova, Sergei Romodanov, Grigory Belov, Valery Nelsky.

On June 11, 1950, "for great achievements in the field of development of theatrical art, in connection with the 200th anniversary of its foundation", the theater was awarded the Order of the Red Banner of Labor.

On April 29, 1966, "for outstanding services in the development of Soviet theatrical art", the Soviet Ministry of Culture awarded the Yaroslavl Order of the Red Banner of Labor Theater named after Volkov the honorary title of academic.

In 1970, the theater was transferred from the subordination of the Department of Culture of the Yaroslavl Regional Executive Committee to the Ministry of Culture of the RSFSR.

In 1975, in connection with its 225th anniversary, the Volkov Theatre was awarded the Order of the October Revolution.

=== Modern period ===
In May 2000, the theatre hosted celebrations to mark the 250th anniversary of Russian theatre. As part of the first Volkov Theatre Festival, the country's leading theatre companies presented their performances: the G. Tovstonogov Bolshoi Drama Theatre, the Alexandrinsky Theatre, the Maly Theatre, the A. P. Chekhov Moscow Art Theatre, the M. Gorky Moscow Art Theatre, theatres from Nizhny Novgorod and Tver. The gala evening dedicated to the 250th anniversary of the First Russian Theatre in Yaroslavl was attended by Russian President Vladimir Putin, who presented the theatre with high state awards.
