= Svetlana Razvorotneva =

Russian politician

Svetlana Razvorotneva MP
- Светлана Разворотнева
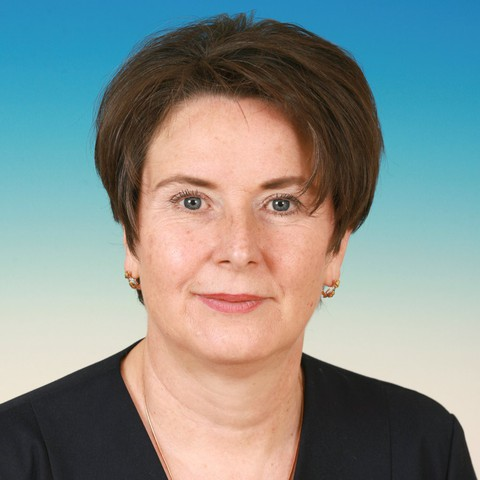
- official portrait, circa 2021

Member of the State Duma for Moscow
- Incumbent
- Assumed office 12 October 2021
- Preceded by: Yelena Panina
- Constituency: Nagatinsky (No. 201)

Personal details
- Born: 25 March 1968 (age 58) Moscow, RSFSR, USSR
- Party: United Russia
- Education: Moscow State University (Ph.D.)

Svetlana Razvorotneva (Russian: Светлана Викторовна Разворотнева; born March 25, 1968, Moscow) is a Russian political figure and a deputy of the 8th State Duma. In 1992, she was granted a Candidate of Sciences in Political Sciences degree.

From 1992 to 1995, Razvorotneva worked as a laboratory assistant and junior scientist at the Institute for US and Canadian Studies. From 1995 to 2003, she was an independent consultant in the field of public relations and election technologies. In 2003–2004, she headed press services of the People's Party of the Russian Federation.

From 2010 to 2014, Razvorotneva was a member of the Civic Chamber of the Russian Federation of the 3rd and 4th convocations. From 2012 to 2021, she was an executive director of the National Center for Public Control in the Sphere of Housing and Communal Services "ZhKH Control".

Since September 2021, she has served as deputy of the 8th State Duma.

== Sanctions ==
She is sanctioned by the United Kingdom from 11 March 2022 in relation to Russia's actions in Ukraine.
