= Yuzhnoportovy District =

Yuzhnoportovy District Южнопортовый район (Russian)
- District
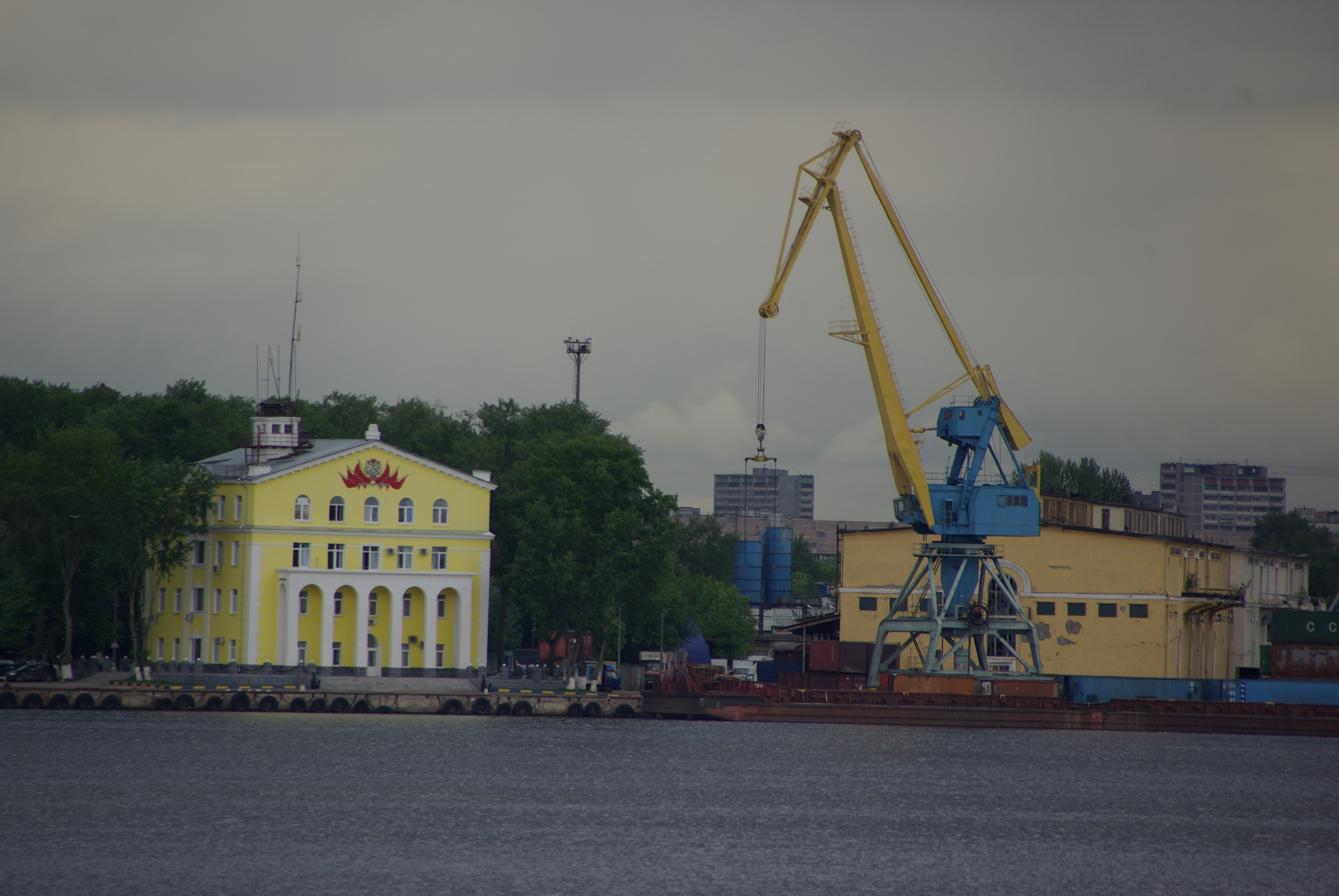
- The former South River Port Building, Moscow River, Yuzhnoportovy District

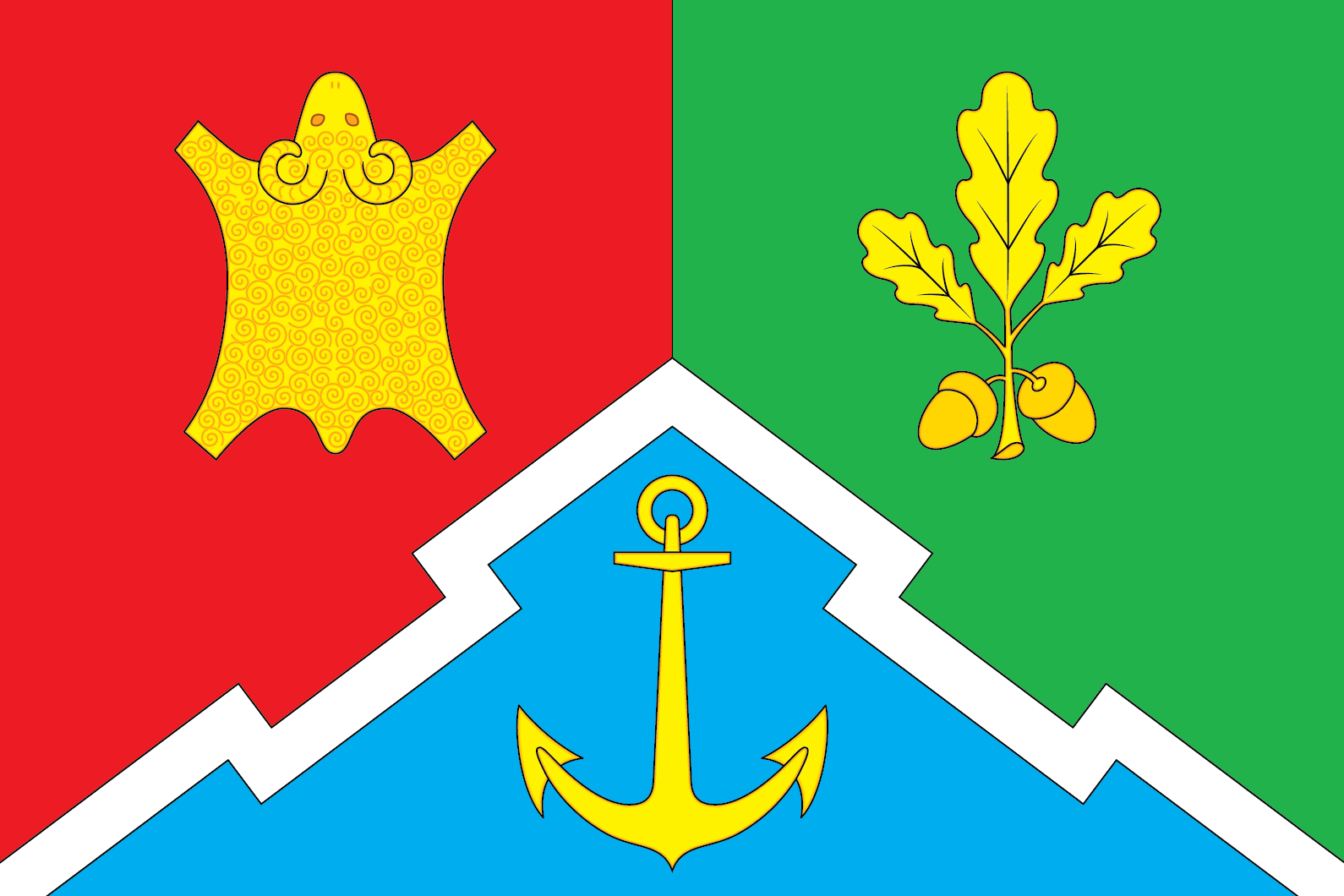
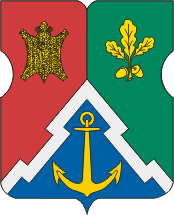
- Flag Coat of arms
- Location of Yuzhnoportovy District on the map of Moscow
- Coordinates: 55°43′08″N 37°40′23″E
- Country: Russia
- Federal subject: Moscow

Area
  - Total: 4.53 km^{2} (1.75 sq mi)

Population
  - Estimate (2017): 73,178
- Time zone: UTC+
- OKTMO ID: 45396000
- Website: http://uzhnoport.mos.ru/

Yuzhnoportovy District is an administrative district (raion) of South-Eastern Administrative Okrug, and one of the 125 raions of Moscow, Russia. The area of the district is 4.53 square kilometers (1.75 sq mi). Population: 73,178 (2017 est.),

== Origin of the name ==
The name comes from the Southern River Port, which is located on the territory of the neighboring Pechatniki district, as well as Yuzhnoportovaya Street, which runs along the border of the district.

== Territory and borders ==
The district borders the Tagansky District of the Central Administrative District in the north, the Danilovsky District of the Southern Administrative District in the west, and the Nagatinsky backwater of the Southern Administrative District in the south, with the Pechatniki and Nizhegorodskiy districts in the east.

== Parks and squares ==
The Yuzhnoportovy District lacks large green spaces. However, it is home to one community park, Bogatyrsky Park, and several smaller squares.

Bogatyrsky Park is a landscaped area along the embankment of the Kozhukhovskiy Zaton (near Trofimova Street). The park was established in 2019 as part of the "My District" program aimed at improving urban environments. The development took into account the wishes of local residents. The design concept was presented by the company "Arkhkom" (with OOO "Teplosnabinzheniring" as the project developer). The park features a waterfront promenade and several recreational areas located on a higher tier near residential buildings. It includes a children's playground, a sports area, and quiet relaxation spots. A distinctive feature of the park is the life-size sculptures of ancient Russian warriors.

Trofimov Square is a landscaped area on Trofimova Street, located opposite the "Svoboda" cinema (Trofimova Street, 17). It was developed in response to requests from local residents and is considered a "people's park". The square is named in honor of Vladimir Trofimov, a Hero of the Soviet Union and infantryman who lived on Trofimova Street (then called 3rd Kozhukhovskaya Street) before World War II. The square features a fountain, a playground, and a monument to Vladimir Trofimov—a bust on a granite pedestal—installed in 2019.

Square on Pyotr Romanov Street is located opposite Library No. 121 (Pyotr Romanov Street, 6). It was renovated in 2019 as part of Moscow Mayor Sergei Sobyanin's "My District" program. The square's highlight is a fountain adorned with a sculpture of a character from Pamela Travers' novel Mary Poppins.

Square near Dubrovka Metro Station is a 3.4-hectare area stretching along Sharikopodshipnikovskaya Street (opposite the Dubrovka shopping center). For some time, it served as a transit zone to the Dubrovka metro station. After its renovation in 2017, the square gained a comfortable walking infrastructure, including benches, a children's playground, a workout area, and a stage for public events. The square is enhanced by a light and music fountain.

Square on Simonovsky Val Street is a city square located opposite house No. 9 on Simonovsky Val Street. It was renovated in 2019 as part of the "My District" program. The square's centerpiece is a dry fountain featuring a sculpture of lovers under an umbrella, an idea proposed by local residents. The renovation also included improvements to the walking paths and the installation of small architectural forms.

== See also ==
- Administrative divisions of Moscow
