= Pyotr Tolstoy (politician) =

Russian journalist, producer, presenter and politician

Pyotr Tolstoy MP
- Пётр Толстой
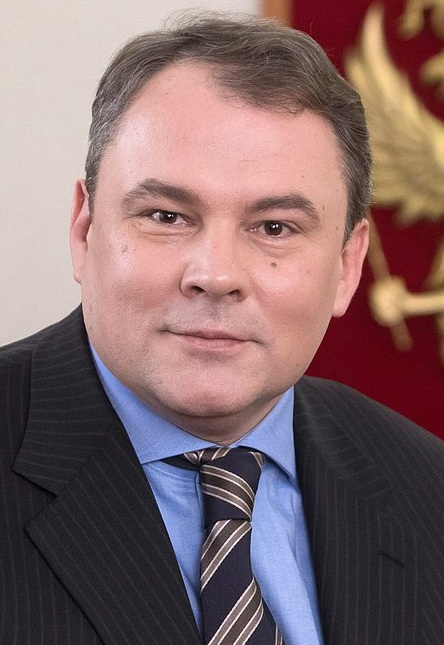
- Tolstoy in 2018

Chairman of the State Duma Committee on International Affairs
- Incumbent
- Assumed office 30 September 2026
- Preceded by: Leonid Slutsky

Deputy Chairman of the State Duma
- In office 5 October 2016 – 30 September 2026
- Chairman: Vyacheslav Volodin

Member of the State Duma for Moscow
- Incumbent
- Assumed office 5 October 2016
- Preceded by: constituency re-established
- Constituency: Lyublino (No. 199)

Head of the delegation of Federal Assembly of the Russian Federation to Parliamentary Assembly of the Council of Europe
- In office 27 January 2017 – 15 March 2022

Deputy chairman of the Parliamentary Assembly of the Council of Europe
- In office 28 January 2020 – 25 January 2022

Personal details
- Born: 20 June 1969 (age 57) Moscow, Russian SFSR, USSR
- Party: United Russia
- Education: MSU Faculty of Journalism

Pyotr Olegovich Tolstoy (Russian: Пётр Олегович Толстой; born 20 June 1969) is a Russian journalist, producer, presenter, and politician. He has been the Deputy of the State Duma since 5 October 2016.

He was deputy chairman of the Parliamentary Assembly of the Council of Europe from 2020 to 2022, and head of the delegation of the Federal Assembly of the Russian Federation to the Parliamentary Assembly of the Council of Europe from 2017 to 2022.

== Journalistic career ==
Tolstoy worked for a time in for the French daily Le Monde and then for Agence France-Presse as a Moscow correspondent.

Tolstoy's work had been criticised as early as 2008 for absence of impartiality and for being pro-government propaganda.

Tolstoy hosted debates for the 2011 parliamentary election and the 2012 presidential election, as well as the election night on Channel One Russia after the 2012 election with Alexander Gordon.

Member of the Civic Chamber of the Russian Federation (2012-2014). A former deputy director of the Directorate of social and political programs on Channel One (2009-2016), a former host of the Sunday news program Vremya (2005–2012), the program Politics (2013-2016) and Time Will Tell (2014-2016) on the same channel.

== State Duma career ==
In September 2016, he was elected to the State Duma from the Lyublino constituency #199 of Moscow, running from the political party United Russia.

On 23 January 2017, he publicly claimed that "grandchildren of those who sprang ... across the Pale of Settlement with Nagants in 1917 and were destroying our churches ... today they are working in revered places like radio stations and legislatory assemblies and are continuing that work." Being publicly accused of antisemitism, he later denied any such context in his words.

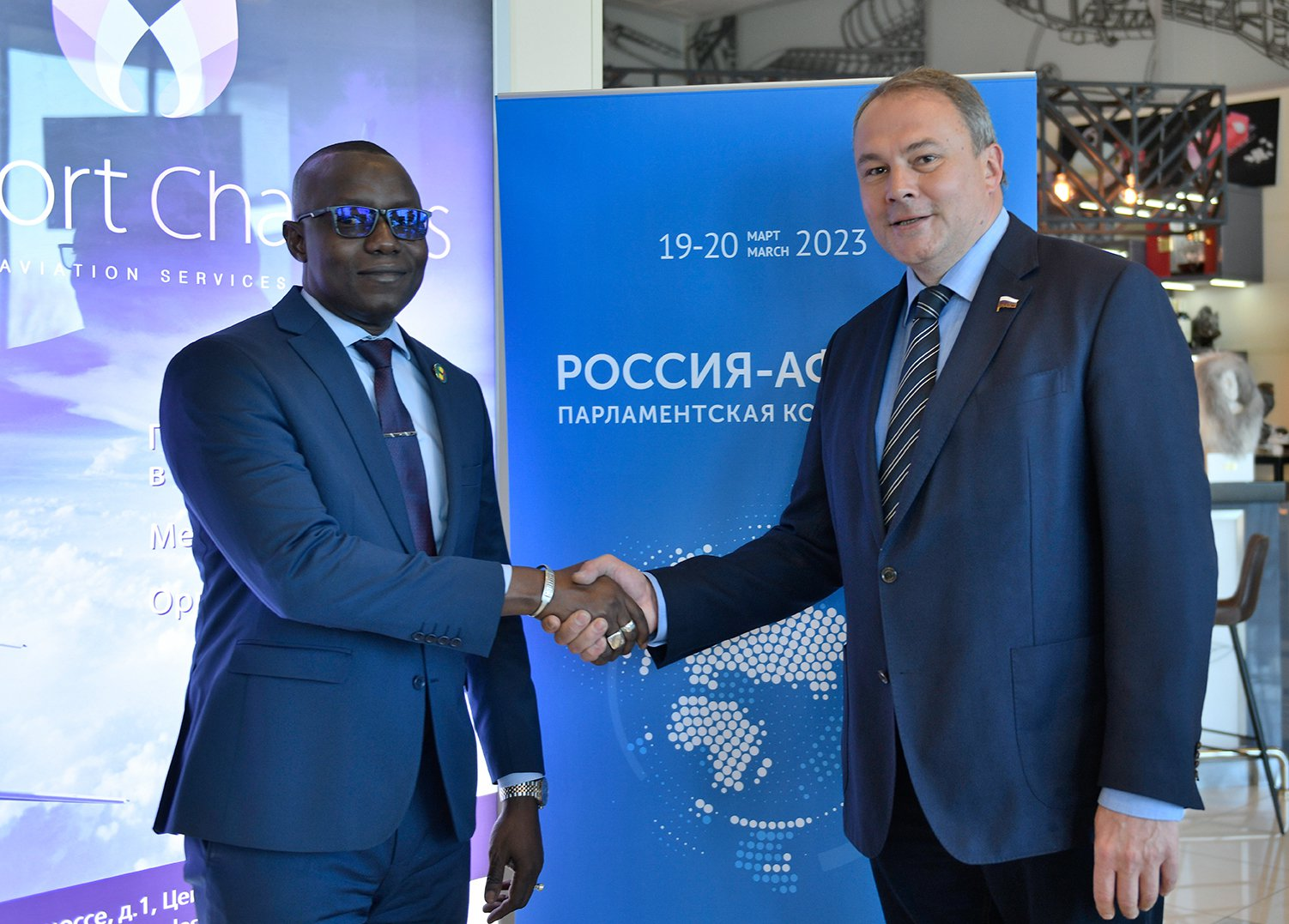
Tolstoy and Malick Diaw at the 2nd International Parliamentary Conference "Russia-Africa" in Moscow on 18 March 2023

In September 2021, he was re-elected from the same constituency.

During the 2022 Russian invasion of Ukraine, he advocated attacking power plants and other civilian infrastructure in Ukraine in order to bomb Ukraine back to the 18th century.

=== At the Parliamentary Assembly of the Council of Europe ===
In April 2014, after the Russian parliament's backing for the annexation of Crimea and Russo-Ukrainian War, the Assembly decided to suspend the Russian delegation's voting rights as well as the right of Russian members to be represented in the Assembly's leading bodies and to participate in election observation missions. However, the Russian delegation remained members of the Assembly. The sanction applied throughout the remainder of the 2014 session and was renewed for a full year in January 2015, lapsing in January 2016. The sanction applied only to Russian parliamentarians in PACE, the Council of Europe's parliamentary body, and Russia continued to be a full member of the organisation as a whole.

In response, the Russian parliamentary delegation suspended its co-operation with PACE in June 2014, and in January 2016 – despite the lapsing of the sanctions – the Russian parliament decided not to submit its delegation's credentials for ratification, effectively leaving its seats empty. It did so again in January 2017, January 2018 and January 2019.

On 25 June 2019, after an eight-hour debate which ended in the small hours, the Assembly voted to change its rules, to make clear that its members should always have the right "to vote, to speak and to be represented", acceding to a key Russian demand and paving the way for the return of a Russian parliamentary delegation. Within hours the Russian parliament had presented the credentials of a new delegation which included Tolstoy at its head. Despite being challenged viva voce, the changes were approved without any sanction by a vote of 116 in favour, 62 against and 15 abstentions. As a result, the Russian delegation which included returned to PACE with its full rights after a gap of five years. In response, the Ukrainian delegation protested before the Assembly, and announced Ukraine would leave the institution. Ukraine returned to PACE in January 2020.

=== Invasion of Ukraine 2022 ===
Following its invasion of Ukraine on 24 February 2022, Russia's membership in the Council of Europe was suspended by the Council of Europe's ministerial body, having consulted the Assembly on 25 February 2022.

On 15 March 2022, following an all-day debate at an Extraordinary Session, the Parliamentary Assembly adopted a resolution calling on the Council of Europe's ministerial body to go further and to "immediately" expel Russia from the Council because of its aggression against Ukraine. It is the first time in its history that the Assembly had made such a call. As the debate was drawing to a close, Tolstoy submitted a formal letter announcing that Russia was withdrawing from the Council; however the debate continued and - in a unanimous vote of 216 in favour, 0 against and 3 abstentions - the Assembly called for Russia's expulsion. The following day, 16 March, at an extraordinary meeting, the Committee of Ministers of the Council of Europe decided that Russia should cease to be a member from that same day, after 26 years as a member state.

In October 2022, because of recent nuclear threats made by Moscow, the Council of Europe adopted a stinging rebuke to Tolstoy declaring Russia a "terrorist" regime.

=== Sanctions ===
He was sanctioned by the UK government in 2022 in relation to the Russo-Ukrainian War.

On 30 July 2025, Tolstoy attended the World Conference of Speakers of Parliament, organized by the Interparliamentary Union in Geneva, Switzerland, in spite of being targeted by Swiss government sanctions. Nevertheless, the Swiss government had issued special permits allowing him to attend anyway, along with a group of 12 other Russian officials also including the Chairwoman of the Federation Council, Valentina Matviyenko, who was targeted by Swiss sanctions as well. Questioned on the matter by the news agency Keystone-SDA, the Federal Department of Foreign Affairs commented that they are responsible for facilitating the entry of official delegates as part of an agreement between the Swiss federal government and the Interpaliamentary Union.

== Personal life ==
Tolstoy is fluent in the French language.

He is a member of the Tolstoy family and Leo Tolstoy's great-great-grandson.
