= Lyublino District =

- District
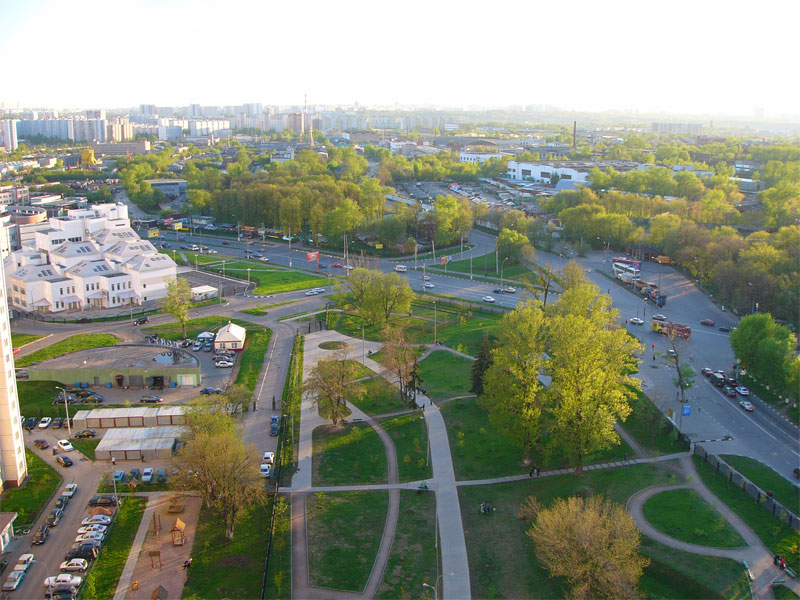
- Verhnie Polia Street, Lyublino District

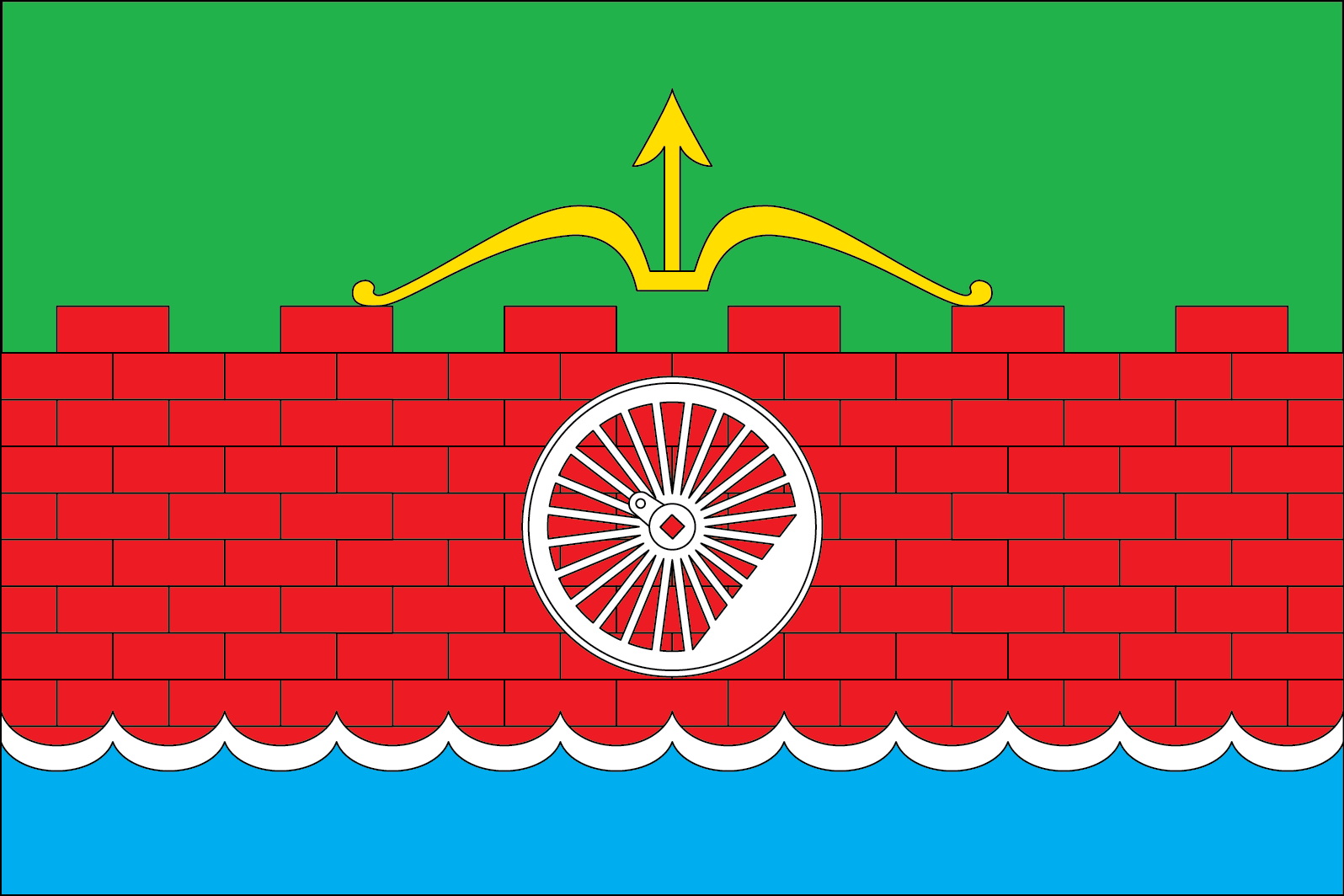
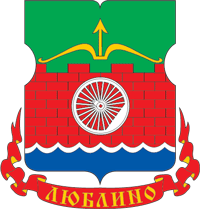
- Flag Coat of arms
- Location of Lyublino District in the City of Moscow
- Coordinates: 55°40′30″N 37°46′00″E
- Country: Russia
- Federal subject: Moscow

Population
  - Estimate (2010): 27,200
- Time zone: UTC+
- OKTMO ID: 45389000
- Website: http://lublino.mos.ru/

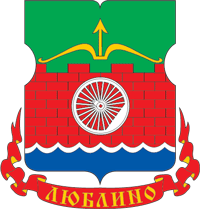
Coat of arms of Lyublino

Lyublino (Russian: Люблино) is a district of South-Eastern Administrative Okrug of the federal city of Moscow, Russia. Population: 165,759 (2010 census); 152,100 (2002 census). The district's area is 17.41 square kilometers (6.72 sq mi), making it the ninth biggest district in Moscow.

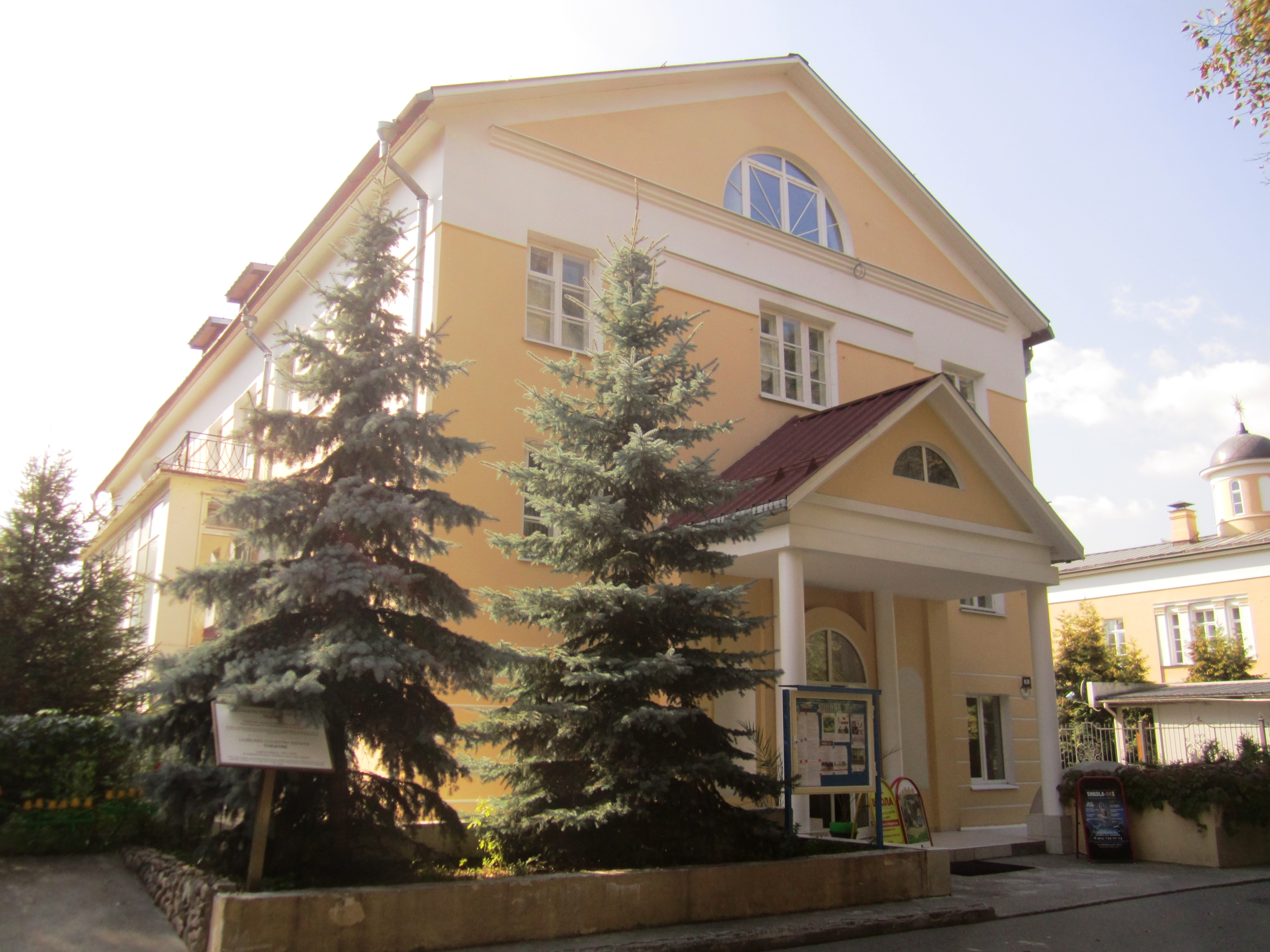
The building of once famous Durasov's krepostnoy theatre, a part of N.A.Durasov's estate in Lyublino.

== History ==
In the mid-16th century, there was a village, known as Godunovo, on the shores of the Goled River. In the 1680s, for the first time, this area was mentioned as Godunovo-Lyublino. In 1772, it was mentioned simply as Lyublino.

During the 18th century, areas of Lyublino were owned by several Russian princes, the most notorious of them are Durasov family, who created Lyublino Park around their estate. In the 19th century Lyublino had been a simple town near Moscow, until a railroad was built there. After 1870 many workshops were built near the railroad station.

In 1866, Fyodor Mikhaylovich Dostoyevsky was living in Lyublino. His impressions about summer spent in Lyublino were described in his novella The Eternal Husband. Also, the great Russian painter Vasily Surikov drew his famous masterpiece "Menshikov v Beryozove" there.

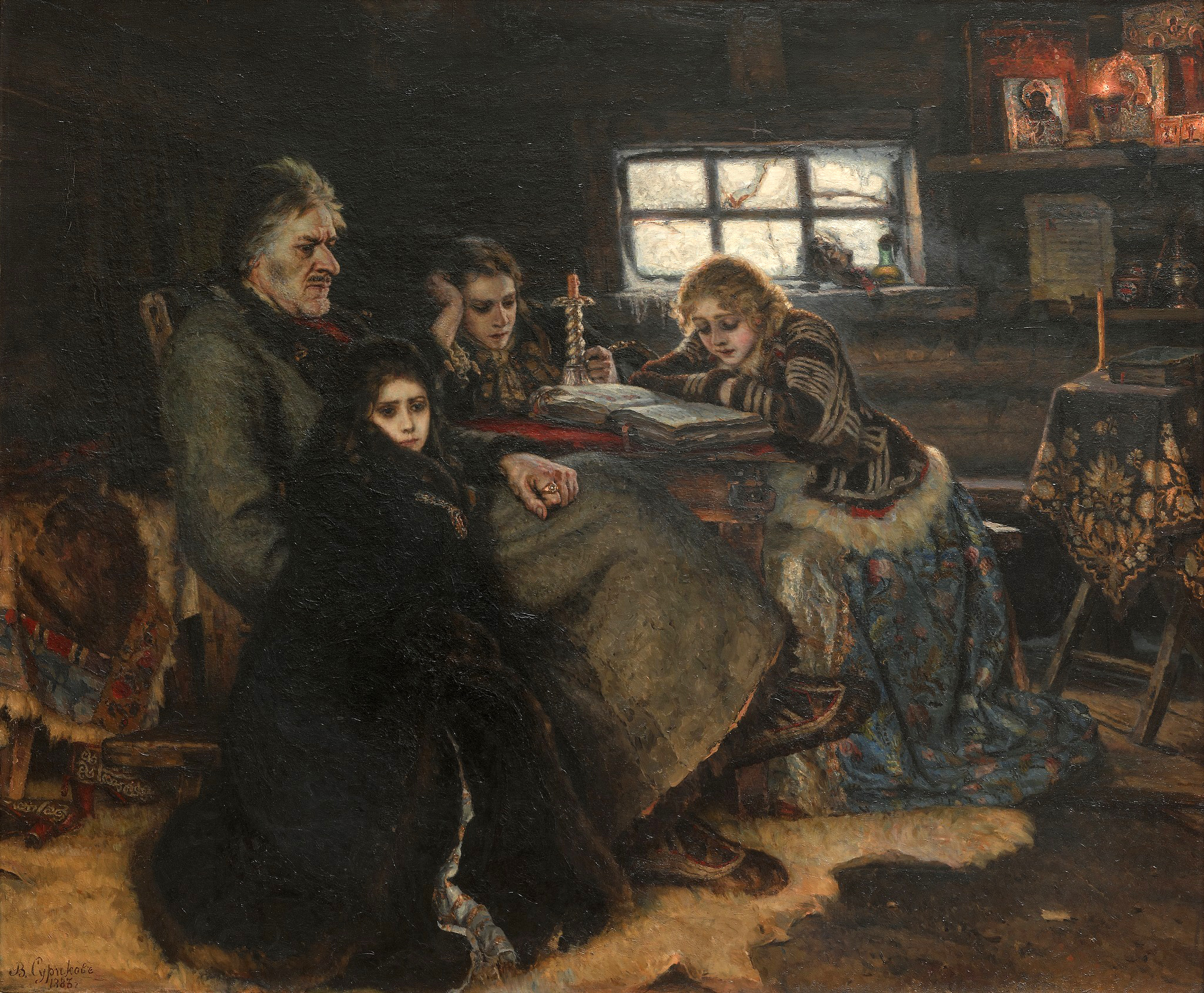
"Menshikov v Berezove" painting by Surikov

In 1925, Lyublino officially became a town, having absorbed all of the surrounding towns. During the Soviet Era Lyublino became a part of Moscow in 1960, as a part of Zhdanovsky District. In 1969 Lyublinsky District was separated from Zhdanovsky District. By the 1970s almost all of the single-storey buildings were destroyed, being replaced with apartment buildings.
