= Nekrasovka District =

- District
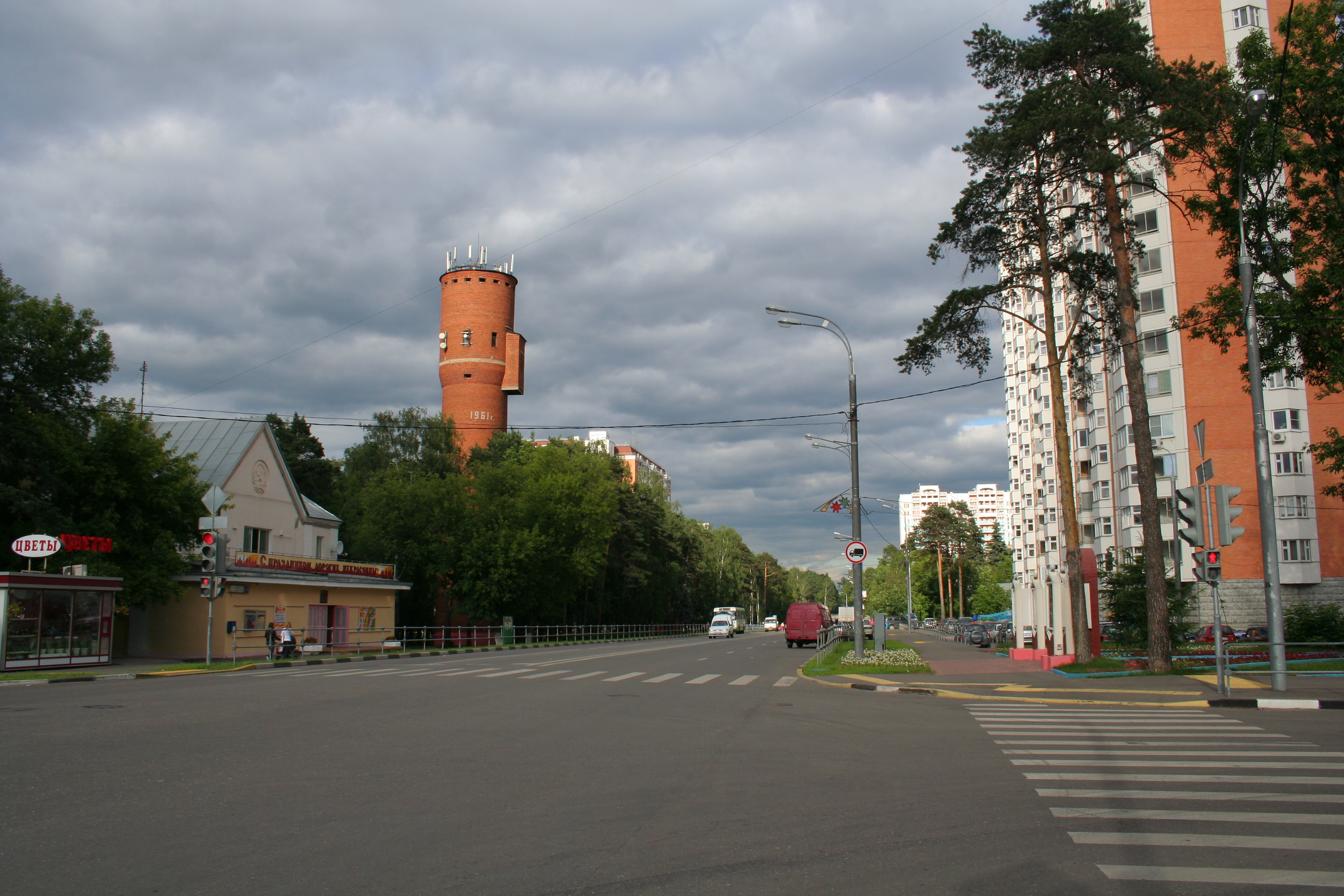
- Street view and water tower, Nekrasovka District

- Flag Coat of arms
- Location of Nekrasovka District on the map of Moscow
- Coordinates: 55°40′59″N 37°56′38″E
- Country: Russia
- Federal subject: Moscow

Area
  - Total: 11.475 km^{2} (4.431 sq mi)

Population
  - Estimate (2017): 68,539
- Time zone: UTC+
- OKTMO ID: 45391000
- Website: http://nekrasovka.mos.ru/

Nekrasovka District (Russian: райо́н Некрасовка) is an administrative district (raion) of South-Eastern Administrative Okrug, and one of the 125 raions of Moscow, Russia. The area of the district is 11.475 square kilometers (4.431 sq mi). Population: 68,539 (2017 est.)

== See also ==
- Administrative divisions of Moscow
