= Kapotnya District =

Kapotnya District Район Капотня (Russian)
- District
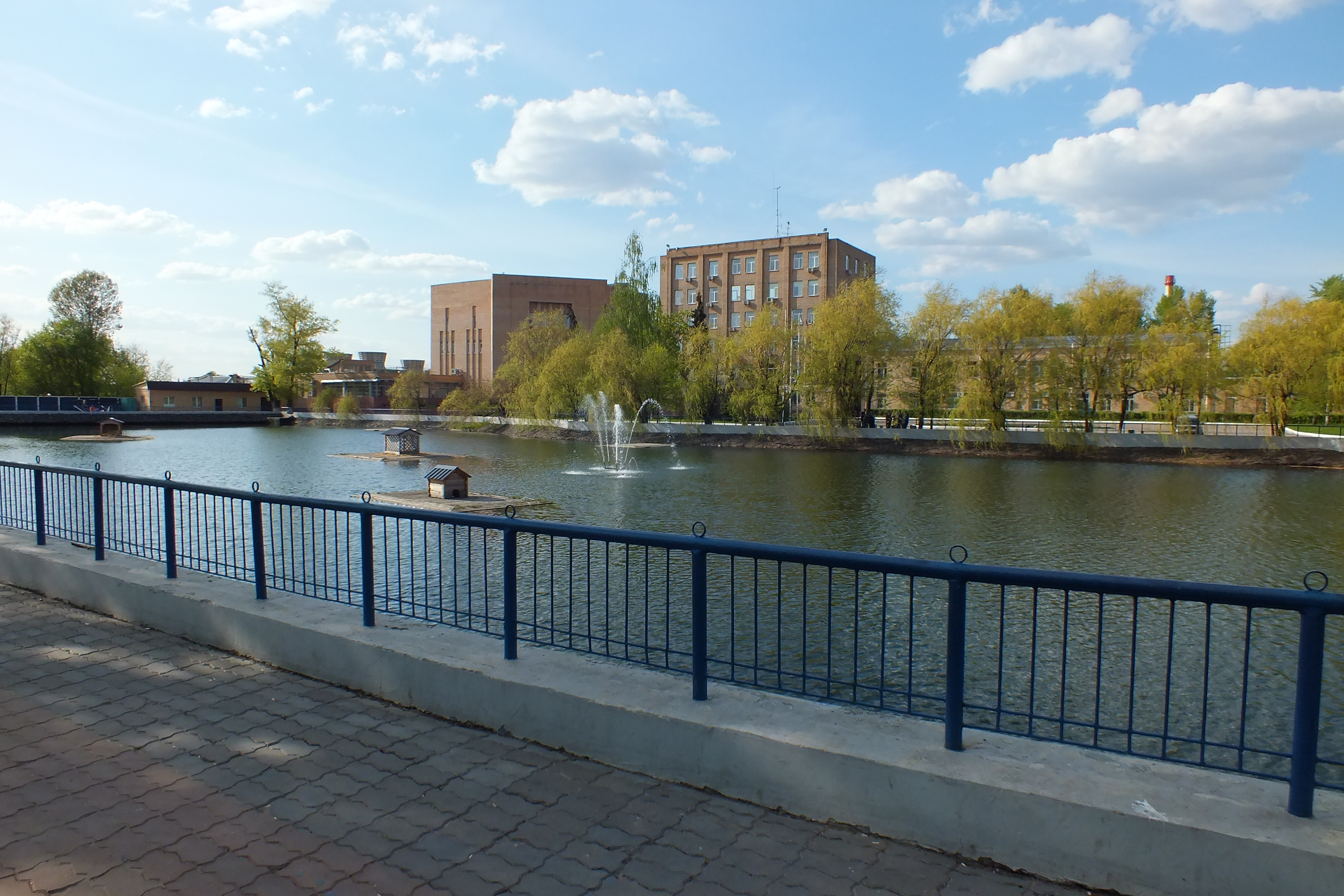
- Pond in the second quarter, Kapotnya District

- Flag Coat of arms
- Location of Kapotnya District on the map of Moscow
- Coordinates: 55°38′28″N 37°48′19″E
- Country: Russia
- Federal subject: Moscow

Area
  - Total: 8.06 km^{2} (3.11 sq mi)

Population
  - Estimate (2010): 27,200
- Time zone: UTC+
- OKTMO ID: 45386000
- Website: http://uprava-kapotnya.ru/

Kapotnya District (Russian: Капотня райо́н) is an administrative district (raion) of South-Eastern Administrative Okrug, and one of the 125 raions of Moscow, Russia.

Kapotnya is best known as the site of Moscow Refinery, one of the few remaining industrial facilities within Moscow proper (since most others were moved to less populous areas for ecological reasons). The refinery claims minimizing environmental risks as its priority.

== See also ==
- Administrative divisions of Moscow
