= Vykhino-Zhulebino District =

Vykhino-Zhulebino District Район Выхино-Жулебино (Russian)
- District
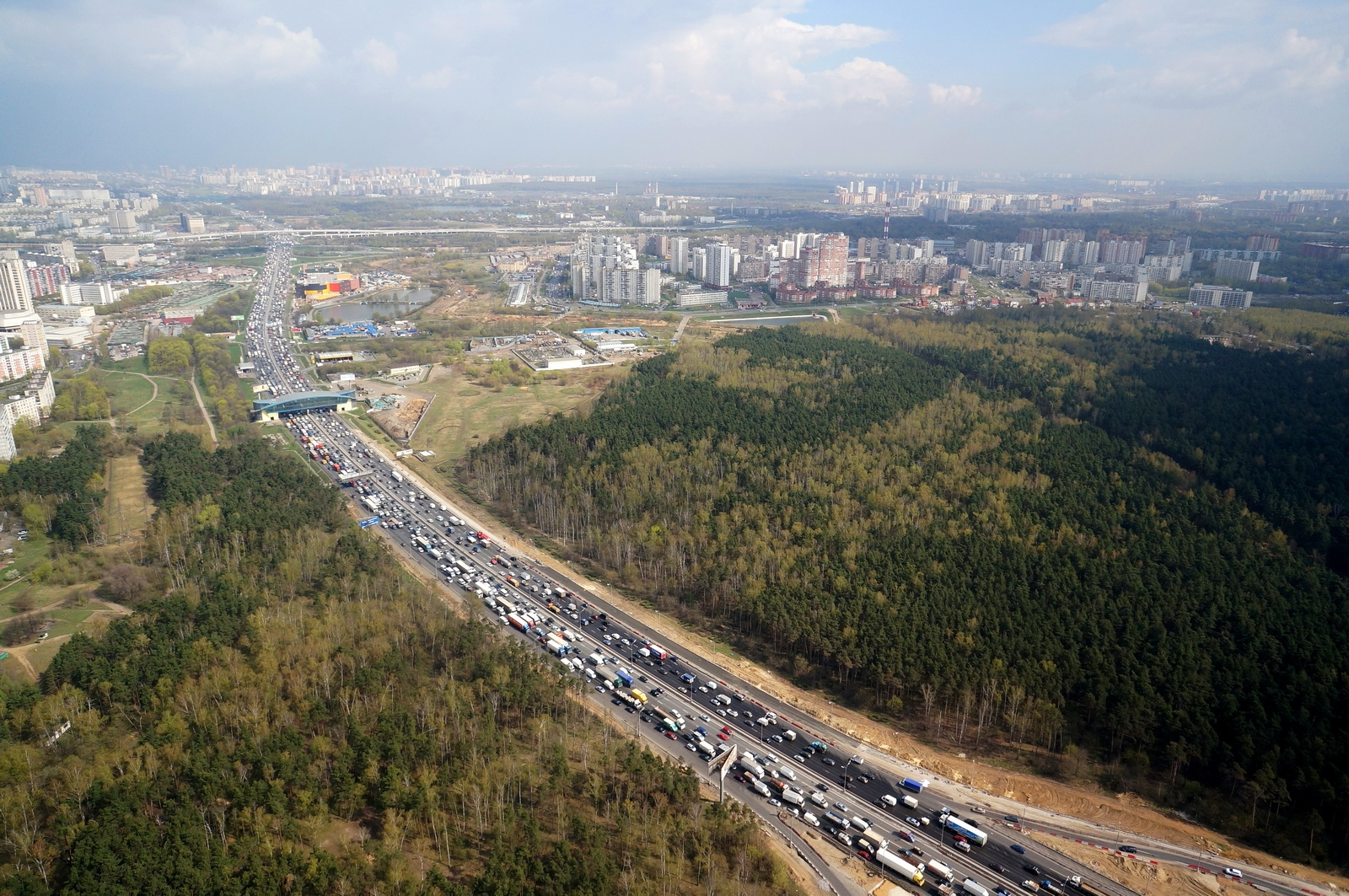
- The Moscow Automobile Ring Road (MKAD) divides the former municipal districts of Vykhino (left) and Zhulebino (right). In the photo, there is Zhulebinskiy Zakaznik to the right of the MKAD.

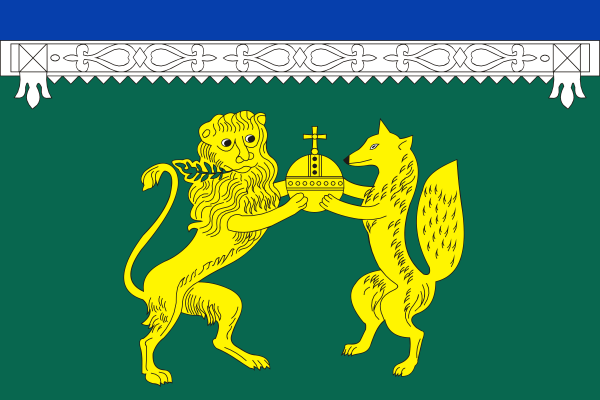
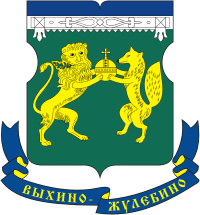
- Flag Coat of arms
- Location of Vykhino-Zhulebino District on the map of Moscow
- Coordinates: 55°42′N 37°49′E
- Country: Russia
- Federal subject: Moscow

Area
  - Total: 14.77 km^{2} (5.70 sq mi)

Population
  - Estimate (2017): 219,600
- Time zone: UTC+
- OKTMO ID: 45385000
- Website: http://vyhino-zhulebino.mos.ru/

Vykhino-Zhulebino District is an administrative district (raion) of South-Eastern Administrative Okrug, one of the 125 raions of Moscow, Russia. The area of the district is 14.77 square kilometers (5.70 sq mi). Population: 219,600 (2016 est.).

== See also ==
- Administrative divisions of Moscow
