= Nagatinsky Zaton District =

- District
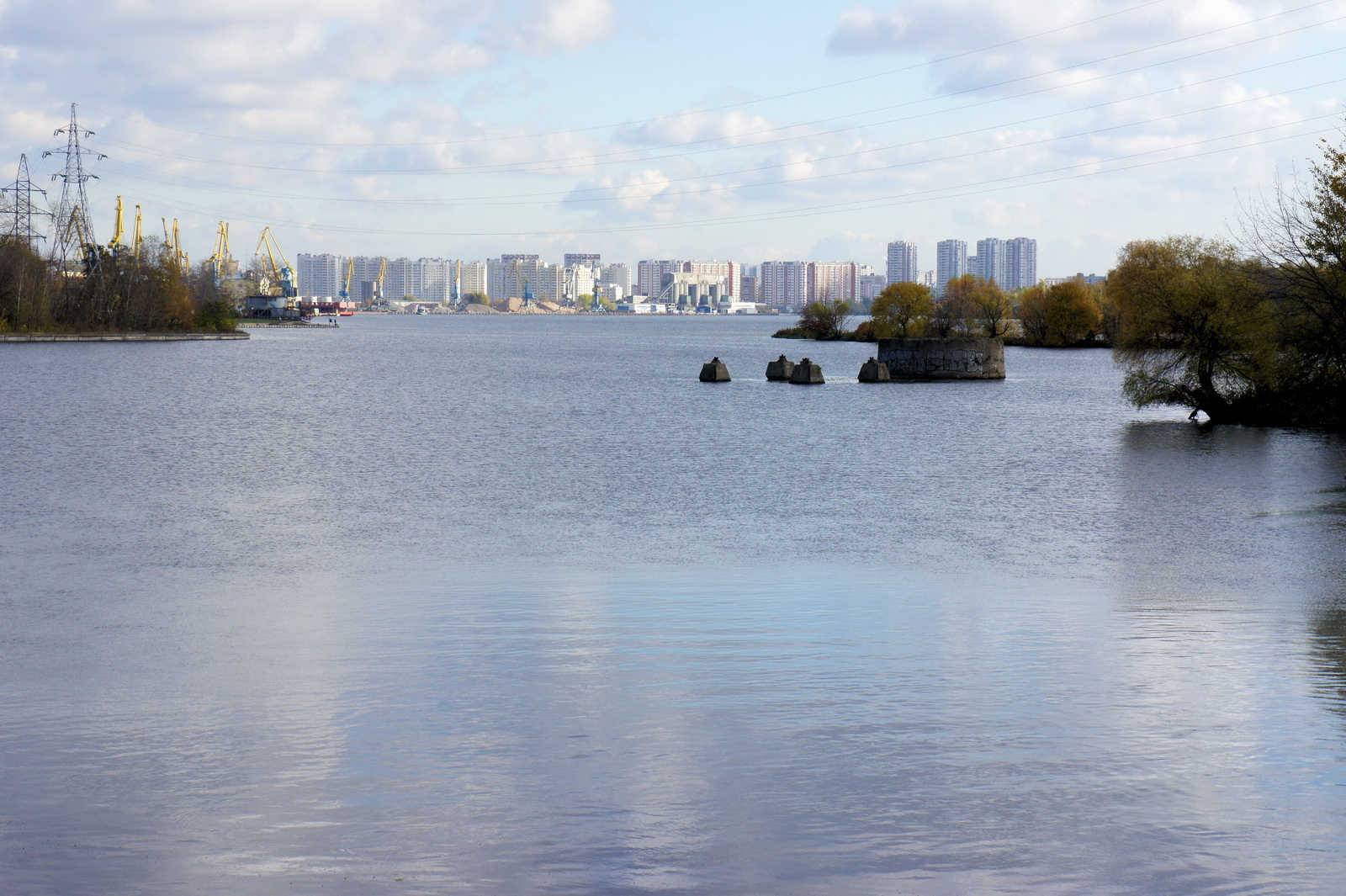
- Nagatinsky Lowlands, Nagatinsky zaton District

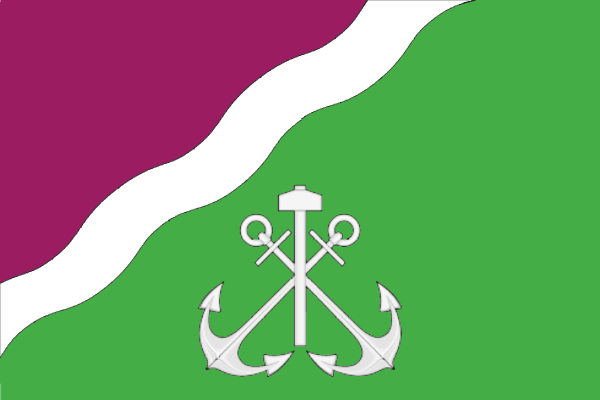
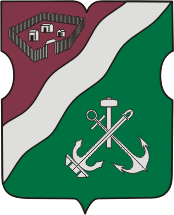
- Flag Coat of arms
- Location of Nagatinsky Zaton District on the map of Moscow
- Coordinates: 55°40′57″N 37°42′08″E
- Country: Russia
- Federal subject: Moscow
- Time zone: UTC+
- OKTMO ID: 45919000
- Website: http://nagatinsky-zaton.mos.ru/

Nagatinsky Zaton District (Russian: район Нагатинский Затон) is a district in Southern Administrative Okrug of Moscow, Russia, located on the right bank of the Moskva River. The name Nagatino comes from a former village, known since the 14th century, which was engulfed by Moscow in 1960. District authorities control Kolomenskoye park, four permanently uninhabited islands on Moskva River and the peninsula of Nagatino Poima on its opposite, northern bank.

Nagatino-Sadovniki is a different district, west of Nagatinsky Zaton.

== History ==
See Kolomenskoye for the history of this area
