= Kuzminki District =

- District
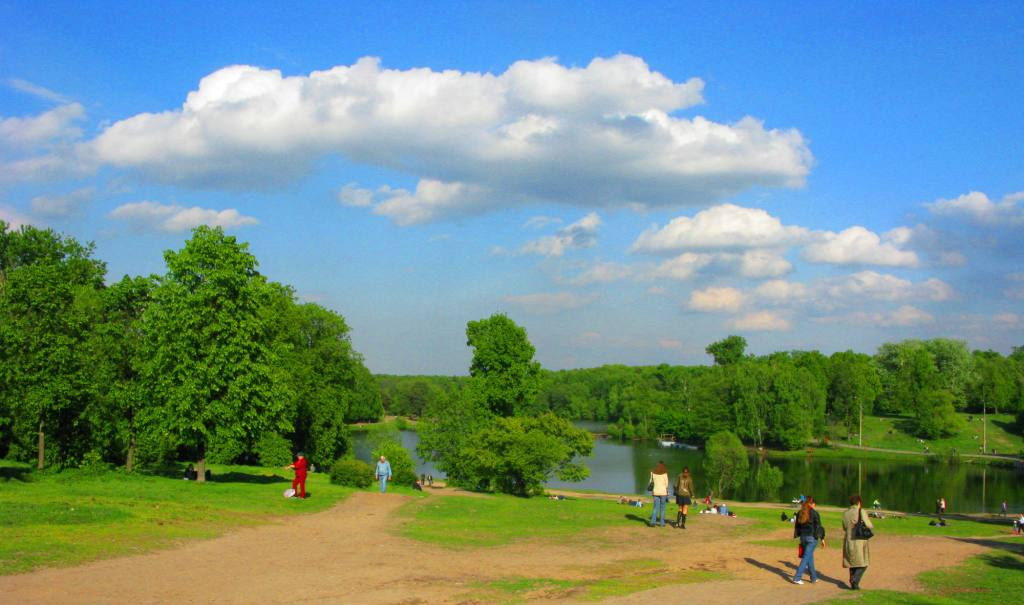
- Park in Kuzminki District

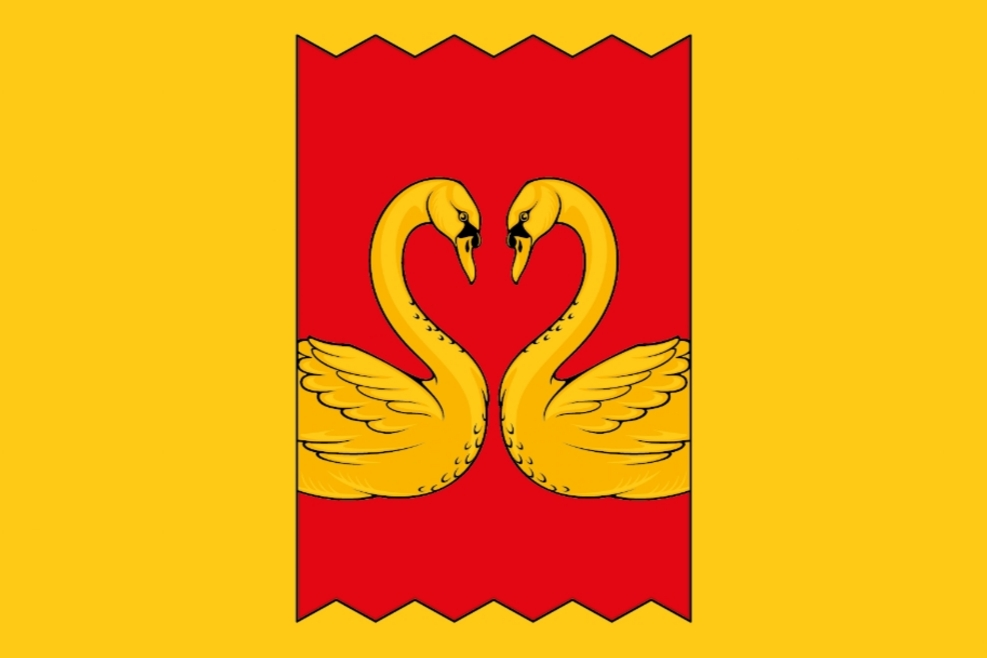
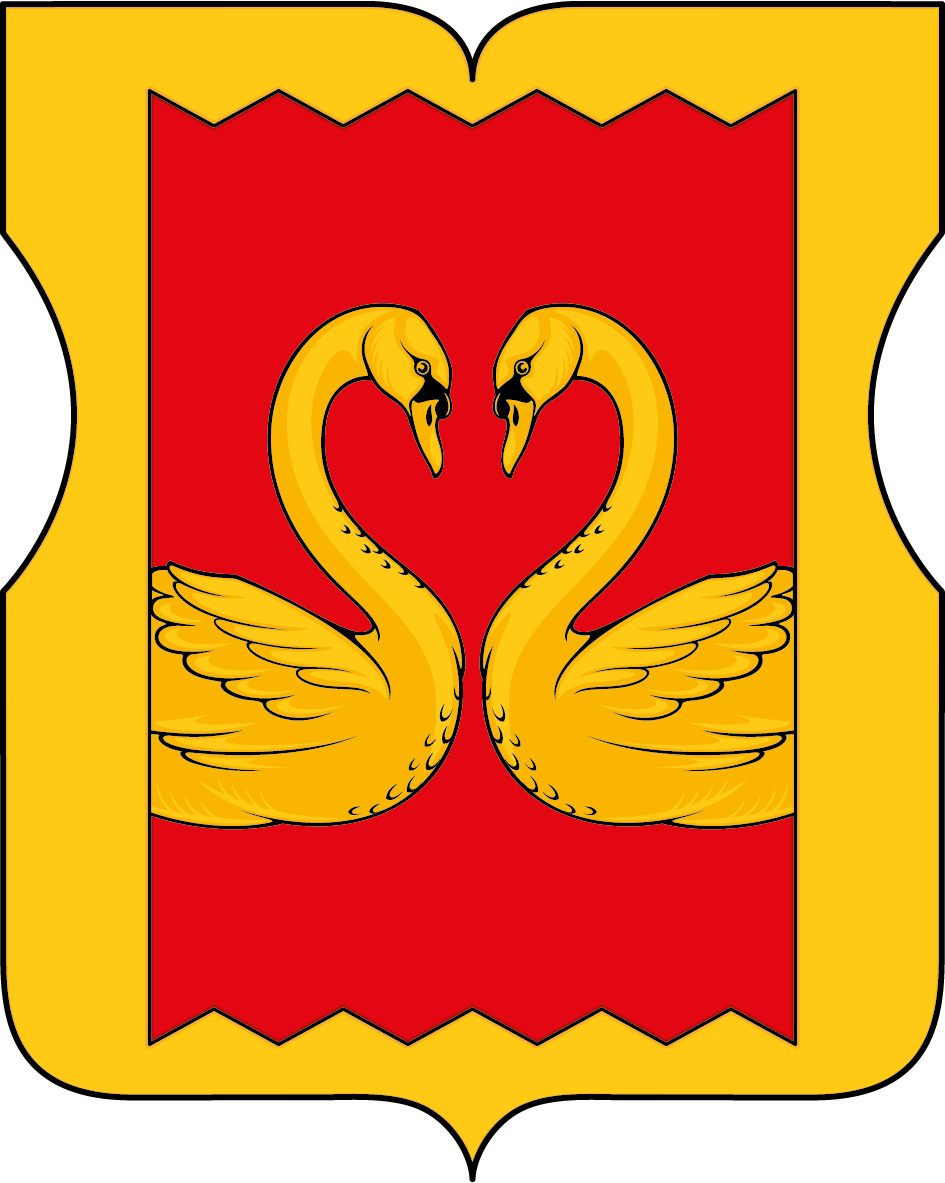
- Flag Coat of arms
- Location of Kuzminki District on the map of Moscow
- Coordinates: 55°41′56″N 37°46′11″E
- Country: Russia
- Federal subject: Moscow

Area
  - Total: 8.15 km^{2} (3.15 sq mi)

Population
  - Estimate (2010): 27,200
- Time zone: UTC+
- OKTMO ID: 45387000
- Website: http://kuzminki.mos.ru/

Kuzminki District (Russian: райо́н Кузьми́нки) is a district of South-Eastern Administrative Okrug of the federal city of Moscow, Russia. Population: 142,249 (2010 census); 122,951 (2002 census).

== History ==
The main point of interest in the district is the Vlakhernskoye-Kuzminki, a former estate of the Stroganov and Golitsyn families. In the 17th century, the territory of the modern district belonged to the Simon monastery. In 1702, Peter the Great gave this land to Grigory Dmitriyevich Stroganov.

== Transportation ==
Two Moscow Metro stations are located in the district: Kuzminki and Volzhskaya.
