= South-Eastern Administrative Okrug =

South-Eastern Administrative Okrug Юго-Восточный административный округ
- Administrative okrug of Moscow
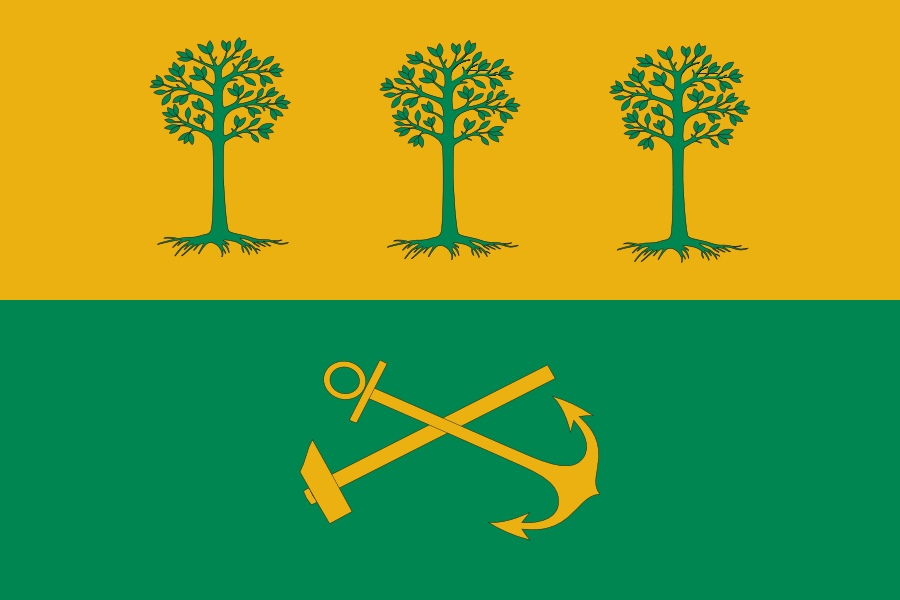
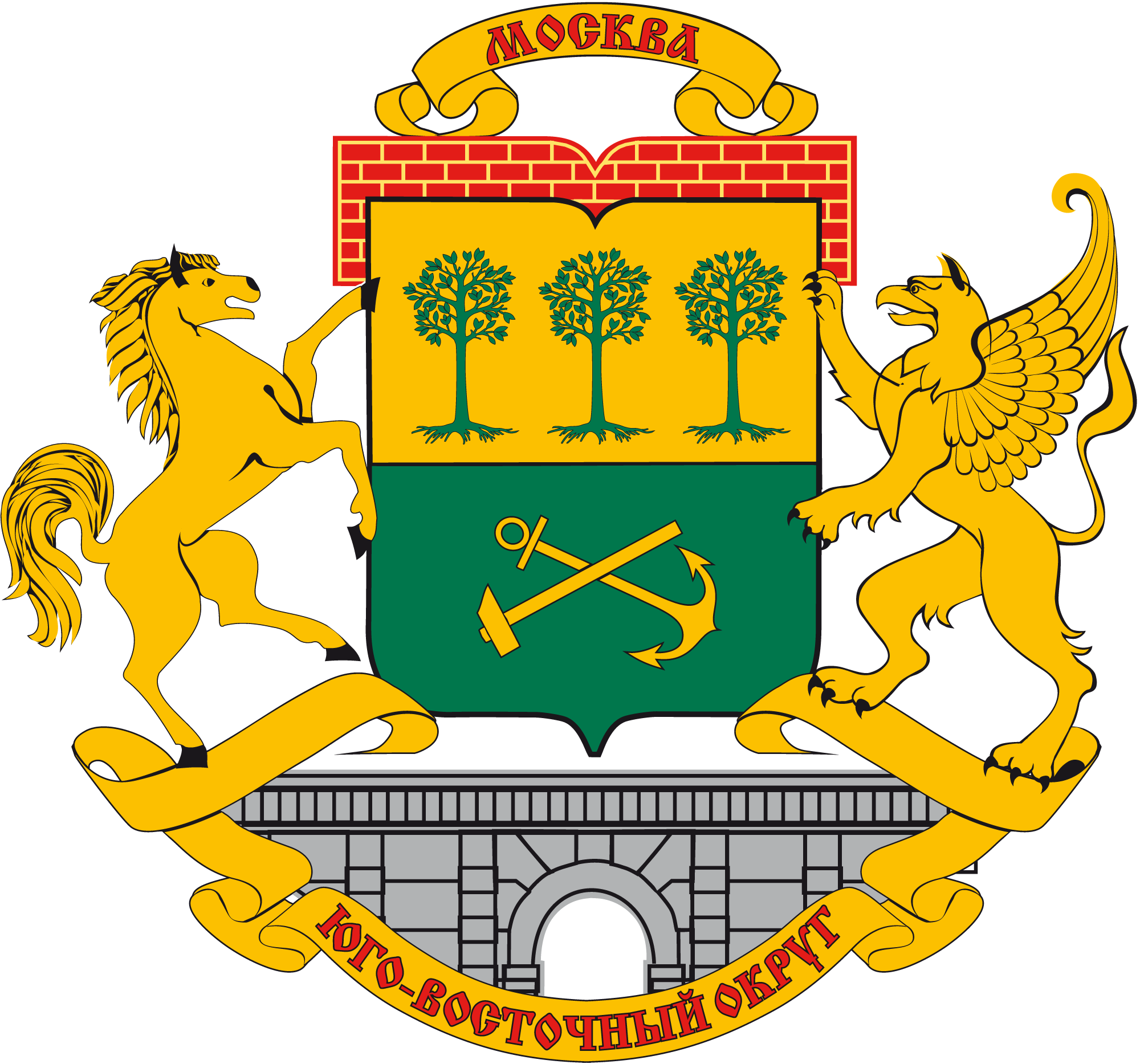
- Flag Coat of arms
- South-Eastern Administrative Okrug in Moscow
- Coordinates: 55°40′N 37°37′E
- Country: Russia
- Federal city: Moscow
- Established: 1991
- Districts: 12

Government
  - Prefect: Vladimir Zotov

Area
  - Total: 123.34 km^{2} (47.62 sq mi)

Population (2010 Census)
  - Total: 1,318,885
- Website: http://uvao.mos.ru

South-Eastern Administrative Okrug (Russian: Ю́го-Восто́чный администрати́вный о́круг, romanized: Yugo-Vostochny administrativny okrug), or Yugo-Vostochny Administrative Okrug, is one of the twelve high-level territorial divisions (administrative okrugs) of the federal city of Moscow, Russia. As of the 2010 Census, its population was 1,318,885, up from 1,109,121 recorded during the 2002 Census.

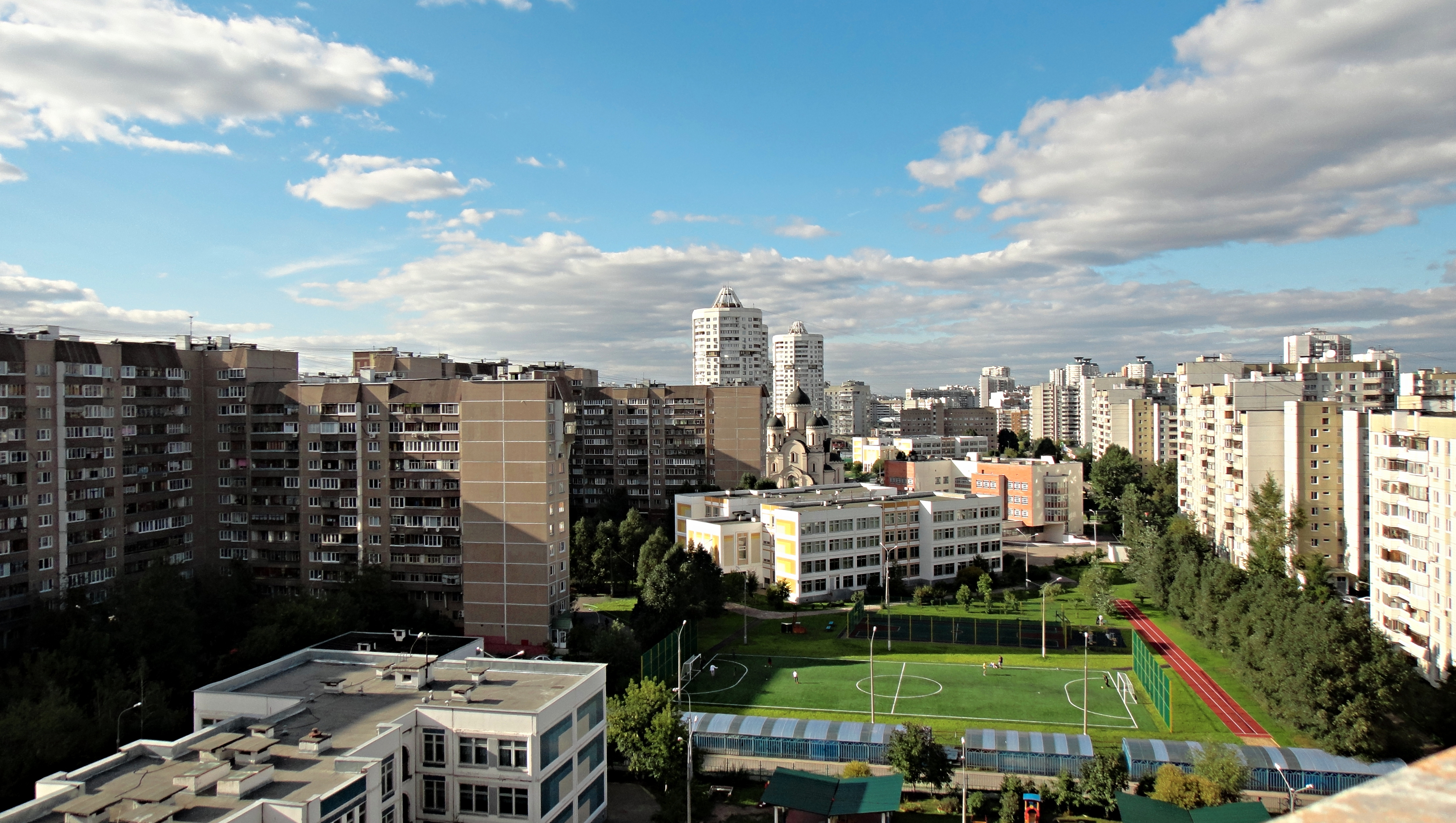
Landscape in South-Eastern Administrative Okrug

== Territorial divisions ==
The administrative okrug comprises the following twelve districts:

- Kapotnya
- Kuzminki
- Lefortovo
- Lyublino
- Maryino
- Nekrasovka
- Nizhegorodsky
- Pechatniki
- Ryazansky
- Tekstilshchiki
- Vykhino-Zhulebino
- Yuzhnoportovy
