= Ryazansky District, Moscow =

- District
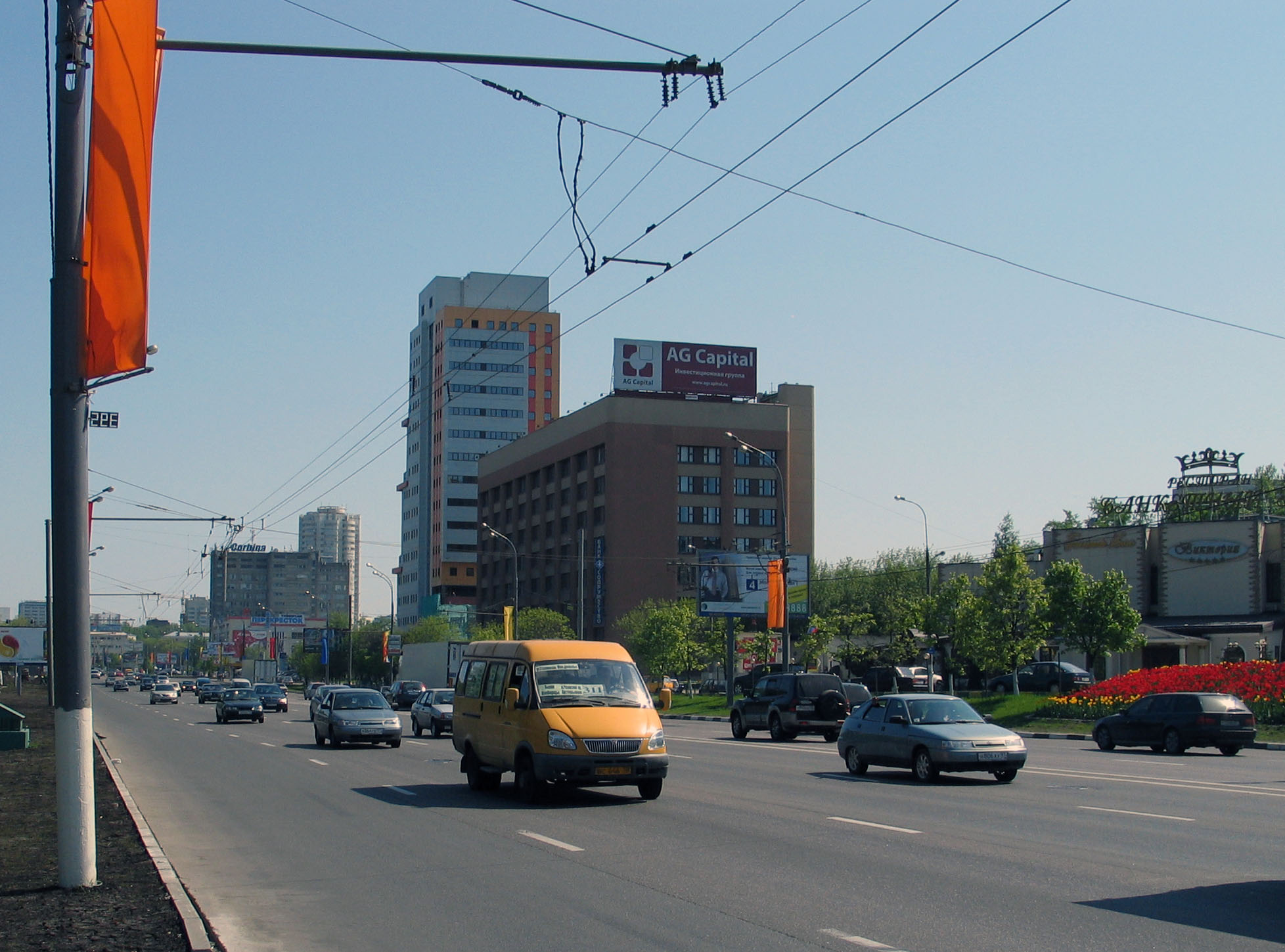
- Ryazansky Prospekt, Ryazansky District

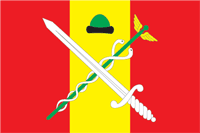
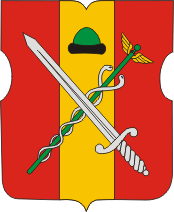
- Flag Coat of arms
- Location of Ryazansky District, Moscow on the map of Moscow
- Coordinates: 55°43′24″N 37°46′13″E
- Country: Russia
- Federal subject: Moscow

Area
  - Total: 6.485 km^{2} (2.504 sq mi)
- Time zone: UTC+
- OKTMO ID: 45394000
- Website: https://ryazansky.mos.ru/

Ryazansky District, Moscow (Russian: Рязанский райо́н) is an administrative district (raion) of South-Eastern Administrative Okrug, and one of the 125 raions of Moscow, Russia. The area of the district is 6.485 square kilometers (2.504 sq mi).

== See also ==
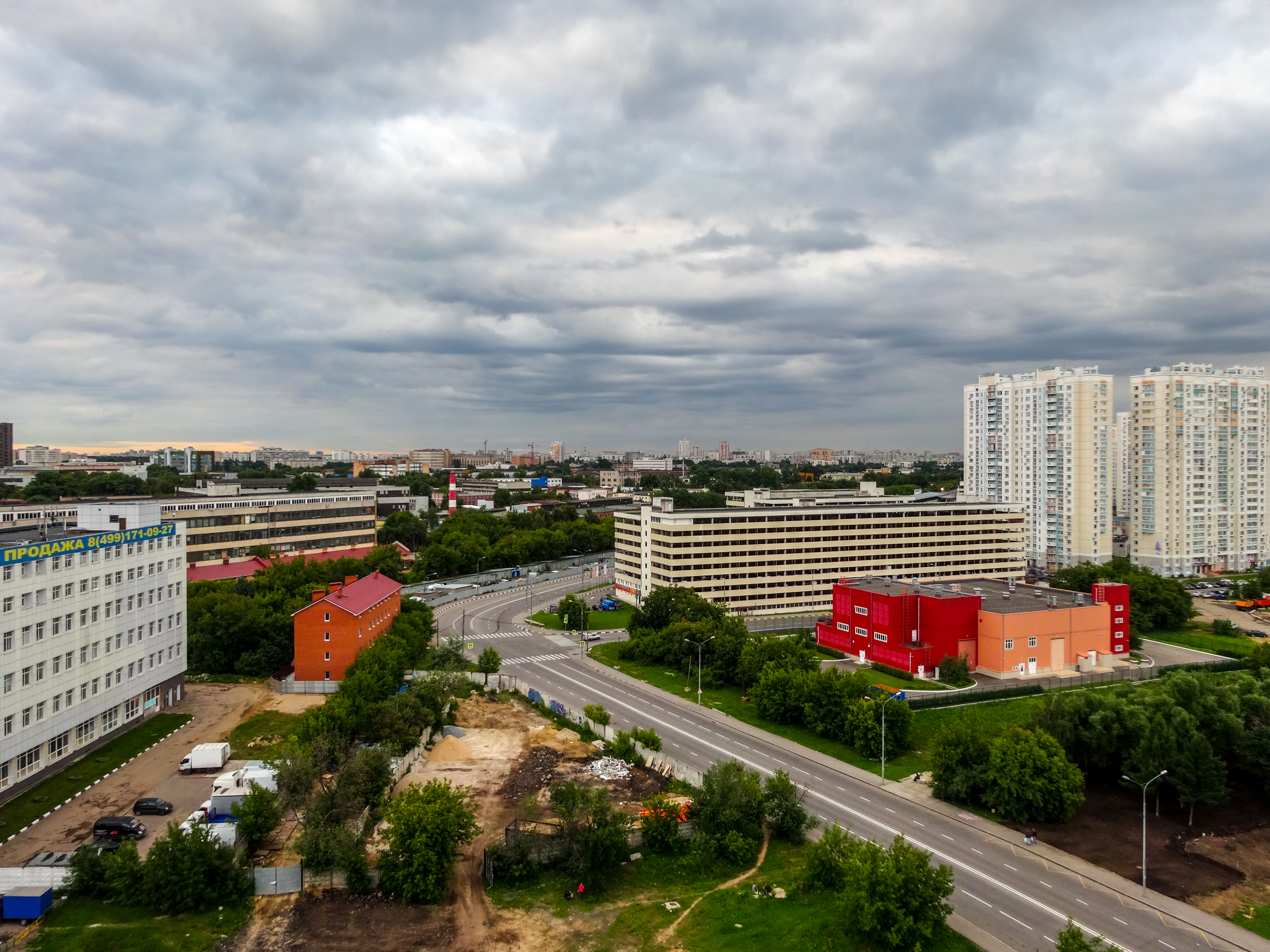
View to Ryazansky district of Moscow. City block 115-A and industrial zone #56 "Graivoronovo". June 2014

- Administrative divisions of Moscow
