= Tekstilshchiki District =

Tekstilshchiki District, Moscow
- District
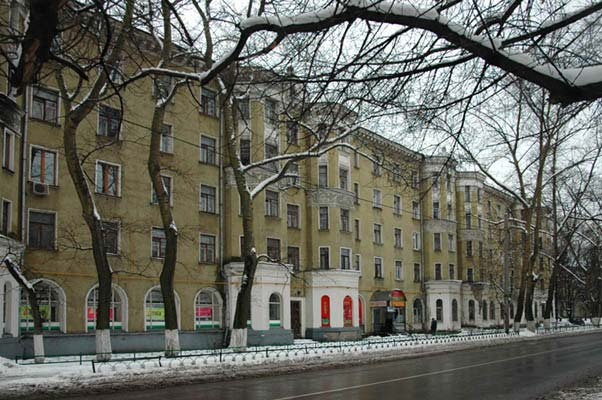
- Saratovskaya Street, Tekstilshchiki District

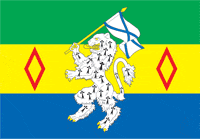
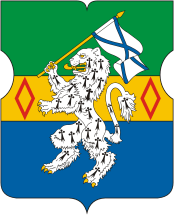
- Flag Coat of arms
- Location of Tekstilshchiki District, Moscow on the map of Moscow
- Coordinates: 55°42′34″N 37°43′42″E
- Country: Russia
- Federal subject: Moscow

Area
  - Total: 6 km^{2} (2.3 sq mi)

Population
  - Estimate (2017): 102,935
- Time zone: UTC+
- OKTMO ID: 45395000
- Website: https://tekstilschiky.mos.ru/

Tekstilshchiki District (Russian: райо́н Тексти́льщики) is a district of South-Eastern Administrative Okrug of the federal city of Moscow, Russia. The area of the district is 6 square kilometers (2.3 mi^{2}). Population: 101,712 (2010 census); 87,849 (2002 census).
