= Nizhegorodsky District, Moscow =

Nizhegorodsky District Нижегородский район (Russian)
- District
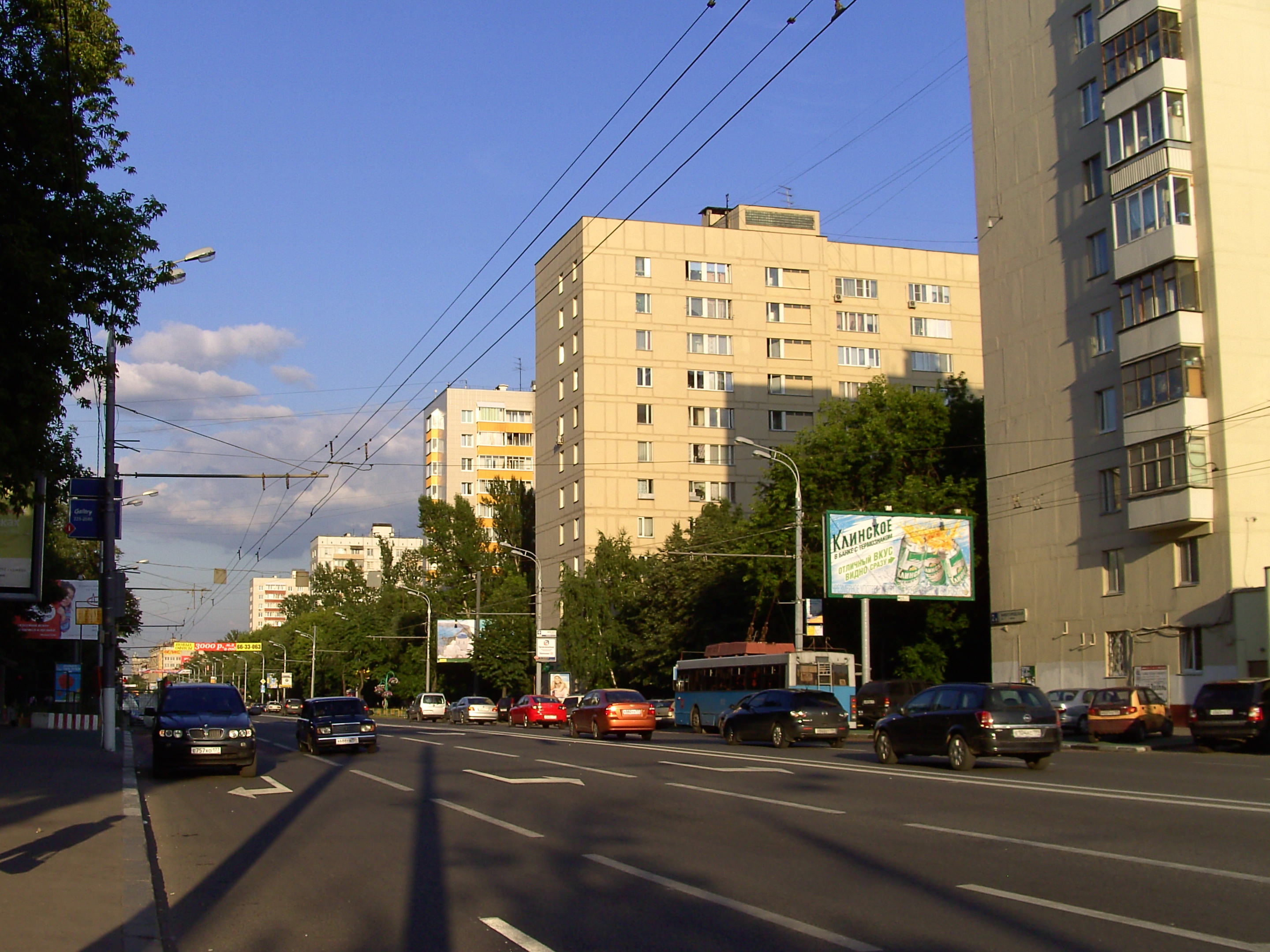
- Nizhny Novgorod Street, Nizhegorodsky District

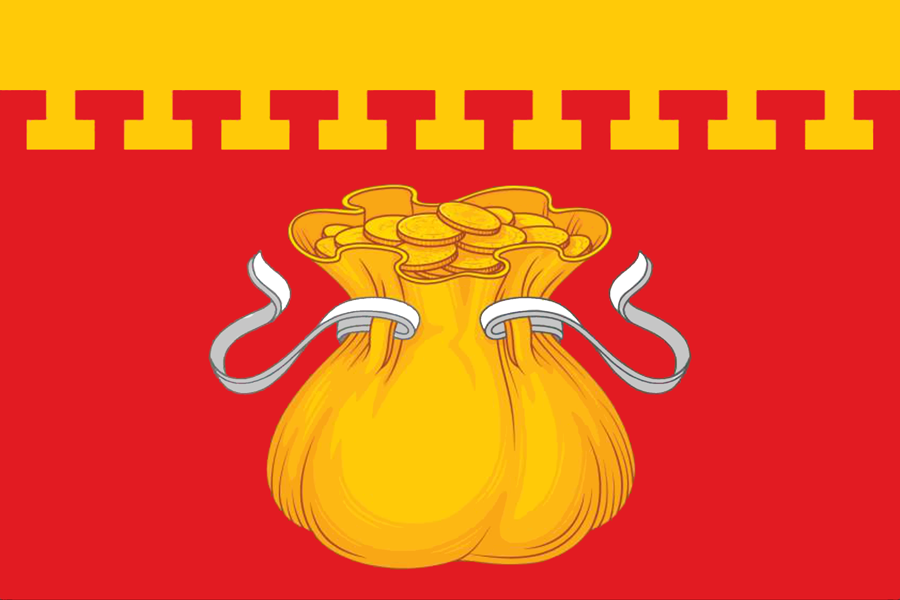
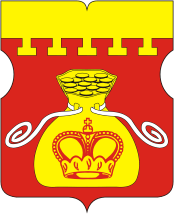
- Flag Coat of arms
- Location of Nizhegorodsky District on the map of Moscow
- Coordinates: 55°43′46″N 37°42′58″E
- Country: Russia
- Federal subject: Moscow
- Time zone: UTC+
- OKTMO ID: 45392000
- Website: https://nizhegorodsky.mos.ru/

Nizhegorodsky District (Russian: Нижегородский райо́н) is an administrative district (raion) of South-Eastern Administrative Okrug, and one of the 125 raions of Moscow, Russia. The area of the district is 7.574 square kilometers (2.924 sq mi). Population: 32,000 (2010 est.).

== See also ==
- Administrative divisions of Moscow
