= Flag of Moscow =

Moscow
- Proportion: 2∶3
- Adopted: 1 February 1995 (current version)
- Design: Dark red background with Saint George wearing armor and a blue cape holding a lance riding on a silver horse stabbing a zilant with a lance

The flag of Moscow, the capital of Russia, is a dark red banner of arms charged as the arms of the city in the centre. It displays Saint George wearing armor and a blue cape with a golden lance in his right hand riding on a silver horse. He is shown stabbing a zilant with a lance. The legend in which the flag came from originated in Jacobus de Voragine's Golden Legend.

The flag was adopted on 1 February 1995. The proportions are 2:3.

== Other flags ==
Flag	Date	Use	Description
	1999–present	Flag of Moscow Oblast	
	1994–1995	Former flag of Moscow	
	2001–present	Flag of the Central Administrative Okrug	
	2004–present	Flag of Krasnoselsky District	
	2005–present	Flag of Presnensky District	
	2000–present	Flag of the Northern Administrative Okrug	
	2004–present	Flag of Aeroport District	
	2004–present	Flag of Begovoy District	
	2004–present	Flag of Beskudnikovsky District	
	2004–present	Flag of Dmitrovsky District	
	2004–present	Flag of Golovinsky District	
	2004–present	Flag of Khoroshyovsky District	
	2004–present	Flag of Khovrino District	
	?–present	Flag of Koptevo District	
	2004–present	Flag of Levoberezhny District	
	2004–present	Flag of Molzhaninovsky District	
	2004–present	Flag of Savyolovsky District	
	2005–present	Flag of Sokol District	
	2005–present	Flag of Timiryazevsky District	
	2004–present	Flag of Vostochnoye Degunino District	
	2003–present	Flag of Voykovsky District	
	2004–present	Flag of Zapadnoye Degunino District	
	2001–present	Flag of the North-Eastern Administrative Okrug	
	2004–present	Flag of the Alexeyevsky District	
	2004–present	Flag of Altufyevsky District	
	2004–present	Flag of Babushkinsky District	
	2004–present	Flag of Bibirevo District	
	2019–present	Flag of Butyrsky District	
	2004–2019	Flag of Butyrsky District	
	2004–present	Flag of Lianozovo District	
	2004–present	Flag of Losinoostrovsky District	
	2004–present	Flag of Marfino District	
	2004–present	Flag of Maryina Roshcha District	
	2004–present	Flag of Ostankinsky District	
	2004–present	Flag of Otradnoye District	
	2004–present	Flag of Rostokino District	
	2004–present	Flag of Severnoye Medvedkovo District	
	2020–present	Flag of Severny District	
	2004–2020	Flag of Severny District	
	2004–present	Flag of Sviblovo District	
	2004–present	Flag of Yaroslavsky District	
	2018–present	Flag of Yuzhnoye Medvedkovo District	
	2004–2018	Flag of Yuzhnoye Medvedkovo District	
	2003–present	Flag of Eastern Administrative Okrug	
	2004–present	Flag of Bogorodskoye District	
	2015–present	Flag of Golyanovo District	
	2003–2015	Flag of Golyanovo District	
	2001–present	Flag of Ivanovskoye District	
	2004–present	Flag of Izmaylovo District	
	2017–present	Flag of Kosino-Ukhtomsky District	
	2001–2017	Flag of Kosino-Ukhtomsky District	
	2018–present	Flag of Metrogorodok District	
	2004–2018	Flag of Metrogorodok District	
	2004–present	Flag of Novogireyevo District	
	2004–present	Flag of Novokosino District	
	2004–present	Flag of Perovo District	
	?–present	Flag of Preobrazhenskoye District	
	2021–present	Flag of Severnoye Izmaylovo District	
	2004–2021	Flag of Severnoye Izmaylovo District	
	2020–present	Flag of Sokolinaya Gora District	
	2004–2020	Flag of Sokolinaya Gora District	
	2018–present	Flag of Sokolniki District	
	2004–2018	Flag of Sokolniki District	
	2004–present	Flag of Veshnyaki District	
	2004–present	Flag of Vostochnoye Izmaylovo District	
	2004–present	Flag of Vostochny District, Moscow	
	2003–present	Flag of the South-Eastern Administrative Okrug	
	2004–present	Flag of Kapotnya District	
	2002–2004	Flag of Kapotnya District	
	2004–present	Flag of Kuzminki District	
	2005–present	Flag of Lefortovo District	
	2004–present	Flag of Lyublino District	
	2007–present	Flag of Maryino District	
	2004–present	Flag of Nekrasovka District	
	2018–present	Flag of Nizhegorodsky District	
	2002–2018	Flag of Nizhegorodsky District	
	2017–present	Flag of Pechatniki District	
	2004–2017	Flag of Pechatniki District	
	2004–present	Flag of Ryazansky District	
	2004–present	Flag of Tekstilshchiki District	
	2004–present	Flag of Vykhino-Zhulebino District	
	2004–present	Flag of Yuzhnoportovy District	
	2000–present	Flag of Southern Administrative Okrug	
	2004–present	Flag of Biryulyovo Vostochnoye District	
	2018–present	Flag of Biryulyovo Zapadnoye District	
	2004–2018	Flag of Biryulyovo Zapadnoye District	
	2004–present	Flag of Brateyevo District	
	2004–present	Flag of Chertanovo Severnoye District	
	2004–present	Flag of Chertanovo Tsentralnoye District	
	2004–present	Flag of Chertanovo Yuzhnoye District	
	2016–present	Flag of Danilovsky District	
	2004–2016	Flag of Danilovsky District	
	2005–present	Flag of Donskoy District	
	2019–present	Flag of Moskvorechye-Saburovo District	
	2004–2019	Flag of Moskvorechye-Saburovo District	
	2016–present	Flag of Nagatino-Sadovniki District	
	2004–2016	Flag of Nagatino-Sadovniki District	
	2019–present	Flag of Nagatinsky Zaton District	
	2004–2019	Flag of Nagatinsky Zaton District	
	2004–present	Flag of Nagorny District	
	2004–present	Flag of Orekhovo-Borisovo Severnoye District	
	2004–present	Flag of Orekhovo-Borisovo Yuzhnoye District	
	2020–present	Flag of Tsaritsyno District	
	2004–2020	Flag of Tsaritsyno District	
	2004–present	Flag of Zyablikovo District	
	2001–present	Flag of the South-Western Administrative Okrug	
	2004–present	Flag of Akademichesky District	
	2004–present	Flag of Cheryomushki District	
	2004–present	Flag of Gagarinsky District	
	2004–present	Flag of Konkovo District	
	2004–present	Flag of Kotlovka District	
	2016–present	Flag of Lomonosovsky District	
	2004–2016	Flag of Lomonosovsky District	
	2004–present	Flag of Obruchevsky District	
	2004–present	Flag of Severnoye Butovo District	
	2004–present	Flag of Tyoply Stan District	
	2004–present	Flag of Yasenevo District	
	2004–present	Flag of Yuzhnoye Butovo District	
	2004–present	Flag of Zyuzino District	
	2002–present	Flag of the Western Administrative Okrug	
	2020–present	Flag of Dorogomilovo District	
	2004–2020	Flag of Dorogomilovo District	
	2004–present	Flag of Filyovsky Park District	
	2004–present	Flag of Fili-Davydkovo District	
	2004–present	Flag of Krylatskoye District	
	2004–present	Kuntsevo District	
	2004–present	Flag of Mozhaysky District	
	2004–present	Flag of Novo-Peredelkino District	
	2004–present	Flag of Ochakovo-Matveyevskoye District	
	2005–present	Flag of Prospekt Vernadskogo District	
	2004–present	Flag of Ramenki District	
	2004–present	Flag of Solntsevo District	
	2004–present	Flag of Troparyovo-Nikulino District	
	2004–present	Flag of Vnukovo District	
	2002–present	Flag of the North-Western Administrative Okrug	
	2004–present	Flag of Khoroshyovo-Mnyovniki District	
	2004–present	Flag of Kurkino District	
	2004–present	Flag of Mitino District	
	2004–present	Flag of Pokrovskoye-Streshnevo District	
	2004–present	Flag of Severnoye Tushino District	
	2005–present	Flag of Shchukino District	
	2004–present	Flag of Strogino District	
	2021–present	Flag of Yuzhnoye Tushino District	
	2004–2021	Flag of Yuzhnoye Tushino District	
	2000–present	Flag of Zelenogradsky Administrative Okrug	
	2000–present	Flag of Zelenograd	
	2004–present	Flag of Matushkino District	
	2004–present	Flag of Savyolki District	
	2004–present	Flag of Staroye Kryukovo District	
	2004–present	Flag of Silino District	
	2004–present	Flag of Kryukovo District	
Novomoskovsky Administrative Okrug
	2007–present	Flag of Kokoshkino	
	2008–present	Flag of Moskovsky Settlement	
	2004–present	Flag of Shcherbinka	
	2004–2004	Flag of Shcherbinka	Design based on the flag of the Russian SFSR
Troitsky Administrative Okrug
	2008–present	Flag of Voronovskoye Settlement	
	2003–present	Flag of Troitsk	
