= 2017 Moscow municipal elections =

Federal city elections in Russia

- 10 September 2017

1,502
	Majority party	Minority party	Third party
Party	United Russia	Yabloko	Independent
Seats won	1,153	176	108
	Fourth party	Fifth party	Sixth party
Party	CPRF	A Just Russia	Party of Growth
Seats won	44	10	5
	Seventh party	Eighth party
Party	LDPR	PARNAS
Seats won	4	2
- Share of winning party's seats by district.

The 2017 Moscow municipal elections took place in Moscow on 10 September 2017. Elections took place for deputies of the municipal councils in 124 of 125 districts of Moscow and in one administrative okrug, for a total of 1,502 seats, which were contested by around 7,500 candidates. The voter turnout was 14.82%. Although the post of municipal council member is relatively powerless, candidates for mayor of Moscow are required to obtain support from municipal deputies to stand in elections.

While United Russia gained the majority with 1,153 seats, the Communist Party of the Russian Federation (KPRF) was replaced in second place by the liberal opposition party Yabloko with 176 seats. The Communist Party only received 44 seats, while 108 went to independents, ten to A Just Russia, five to the Party of Growth, four to the Liberal Democratic Party of Russia (LDPR), and two to the People's Freedom Party (PARNAS). Because of the large number of seats that went to opposition parties and independents, and the fact that in several districts they obtained the majority, the elections were regarded as progress for the liberal opposition in Russia. Dmitry Gudkov, opposition politician and former member the State Duma who organized the effort to get opposition candidates on the municipal councils, stated that "our victory wasn't complete, but it is a victory."

== Results ==
=== Overview ===
Composition of the municipal council seats

In multiple districts in the center of Moscow as well as some on the periphery of the city, the ruling party United Russia suffered defeats to opposition candidates, who in total received a combined total of nearly 20% of the seats. The opposition had formed a coalition called 'United Democrats' to get candidates elected to municipal councils of deputies.

- In seven districts of the city, not a single United Russia candidate was elected.
- In 25 districts United Russia deputies formed a minority in the local council.
- In five districts the opposition and United Russia received an equal number of seats.

In the Gagarinsky District, where President Vladimir Putin voted, twelve out of the twelve seats went to members of the liberal party Yabloko. In the Tverskoy District, where the Moscow Kremlin is located, Yabloko received ten of the twelve seats.

Dmitry Gudkov stated after the municipal election that his intent was to run for mayor of Moscow in the 2018 election, but Yabloko did not pass the minimum requirement for the municipal filter, according to Moscow Election Commission.

=== By district ===
Listed in Russian alphabetical order:

District	Seats	ER	Yabloko	Independents	KPRF	SR	PR	LDPR	PARNAS
Akademichesky	12	0	5	1	3	0	2	0	1
Alexeyevsky	10	4	4	2	0	0	0	0	0
Altufyevsky	12	11	0	1	0	0	0	0	0
Arbat	10	5	4	1	0	0	0	0	0
Aeroport	12	3	6	1	0	0	2	0	0
Babushkinsky	10	9	1	0	0	0	0	0	0
Basmanny	12	7	4	1	0	0	0	0	0
Begovoy	10	7	3	0	0	0	0	0	0
Beskudnikovsky	10	10	0	0	0	0	0	0	0
Bibirevo	15	15	0	0	0	0	0	0	0
Biryulyovo Vostochnoye	15	15	0	0	0	0	0	0	0
Biryulyovo Zapadnoye	10	10	0	0	0	0	0	0	0
Bogorodskoye	15	10	1	2	0	2	0	0	0
Brateyevo	10	10	0	0	0	0	0	0	0
Butyrsky	10	6	1	0	2	0	1	0	0
Veshnyaki	15	15	0	0	0	0	0	0	0
Vnukovo	10	10	0	0	0	0	0	0	0
Voikovsky	10	7	2	1	0	0	0	0	0
Vostochnoye Degunino	10	10	0	0	0	0	0	0	0
Vostochnoye Izmaylovo	10	10	0	0	0	0	0	0	0
Vostochny	10	4	0	0	0	6	0	0	0
Vykhino-Zhulebino	20	19	0	1	0	0	0	0	0
Gagarinsky	12	0	12	0	0	0	0	0	0
Golovinsky	15	13	2	0	0	0	0	0	0
Golyanovo	15	15	0	0	0	0	0	0	0
Danilovsky	12	9	2	1	0	0	0	0	0
Dmitrovsky	10	10	0	0	0	0	0	0	0
Donskoy	10	8	2	0	0	0	0	0	0
Dorogomilovo	12	6	6	0	0	0	0	0	0
Zamoskvorechye	10	6	4	0	0	0	0	0	0
Zapadnoye Degunino	10	10	0	0	0	0	0	0	0
Zyuzino	15	7	2	6	0	0	0	0	0
Zyablikovo	15	15	0	0	0	0	0	0	0
Ivanovskoye	15	15	0	0	0	0	0	0	0
Izmaylovo	12	3	4	3	1	0	0	1	0
Kapotnya	10	10	0	0	0	0	0	0	0
Konkovo	15	6	6	3	0	0	0	0	0
Koptevo	15	15	0	0	0	0	0	0	0
Kosino-Ukhtomsky	10	10	0	0	0	0	0	0	0
Kotlovka	10	10	0	0	0	0	0	0	0
Krasnoselsky	10	3	0	7	0	0	0	0	0
Krylatskoye	10	5	0	5	0	0	0	0	0
Kryukovo	10	10	0	0	0	0	0	0	0
Kuzminki	15	15	0	0	0	0	0	0	0
Kuntsevo	10	4	3	1	2	0	0	0	0
Kurkino	10	0	0	10	0	0	0	0	0
Levoberezhny	10	9	1	0	0	0	0	0	0
Lefortovo	15	11	0	1	3	0	0	0	0
Lianozovo	15	15	0	0	0	0	0	0	0
Lomonosovsky	10	2	6	1	1	0	0	0	0
Losinoostrovsky	12	10	1	0	1	0	0	0	0
Lyublino	20	20	0	0	0	0	0	0	0
Marfino	10	10	0	0	0	0	0	0	0
Maryina Roshcha	10	5	5	0	0	0	0	0	0
Maryino	20	20	0	0	0	0	0	0	0
Matushkino	10	10	0	0	0	0	0	0	0
Metrogorodok	10	10	0	0	0	0	0	0	0
Meshchansky	10	5	3	2	0	0	0	0	0
Mitino	12	11	1	0	0	0	0	0	0
Mozhaisky	10	8	1	0	1	0	0	0	0
Molzhaninovsky	10	1	0	6	2	0	0	1	0
Moskvorechye-Saburovo	10	10	0	0	0	0	0	0	0
Nagatino-Sadovniki	10	10	0	0	0	0	0	0	0
Nagatinsky Zaton	10	10	0	0	0	0	0	0	0
Nagorny	10	10	0	0	0	0	0	0	0
Nekrasovka	15	14	0	0	1	0	0	0	0
Nizhegorodsky	10	10	0	0	0	0	0	0	0
Novogireyevo	12	12	0	0	0	0	0	0	0
Novokosino	15	15	0	0	0	0	0	0	0
Novo-Peredelkino	10	10	0	0	0	0	0	0	0
Obruchevsky	10	10	0	0	0	0	0	0	0
Orekhovo-Borisovo Severnoye	15	15	0	0	0	0	0	0	0
Orekhovo-Borisovo Uzhnoye	15	15	0	0	0	0	0	0	0
Ostankinsky	12	0	1	4	7	0	0	0	0
Otradnoye	18	15	1	1	0	1	0	0	0
Ochakovo-Matveyevskoye	10	10	0	0	0	0	0	0	0
Perovo	15	14	0	0	1	0	0	0	0
Pechatniki	15	11	0	2	2	0	0	0	0
Pokrovskoye-Streshnevo	12	11	1	0	0	0	0	0	0
Preobrazhenskoye	10	6	4	0	0	0	0	0	0
Presnensky	15	5	1	9	0	0	0	0	0
Prospekt Vernadskogo	10	7	2	0	1	0	0	0	0
Ramenki	12	0	4	6	2	0	0	0	0
Rostokino	10	7	0	3	0	0	0	0	0
Ryazansky	10	10	0	0	0	0	0	0	0
Savyolki	10	10	0	0	0	0	0	0	0
Savyolovsky	12	11	1	0	0	0	0	0	0
Sviblovo	12	11	1	0	0	0	0	0	0
Severnoye Butovo	10	10	0	0	0	0	0	0	0
Severnoye Izmaylovo	12	10	1	1	0	0	0	0	0
Severnoye Medvedkovo	15	12	0	1	0	0	0	2	0
Severnoye Tushino	15	12	3	0	0	0	0	0	0
Severny District	10	10	0	0	0	0	0	0	0
Silino	10	9	0	1	0	0	0	0	0
Sokol	10	3	5	1	1	0	0	0	0
Sokolinaya Gora	12	12	0	0	0	0	0	0	0
Sokolniki	10	10	0	0	0	0	0	0	0
Solntsevo	10	10	0	0	0	0	0	0	0
Staroye Kryukovo	10	10	0	0	0	0	0	0	0
Strogino	16	15	1	0	0	0	0	0	0
Tagansky	15	12	2	0	0	1	0	0	0
Tverskoy	12	1	10	1	0	0	0	0	0
Tekstilshchiki	10	10	0	0	0	0	0	0	0
Tyoply Stan	15	14	0	1	0	0	0	0	0
Timiryazevsky	15	8	4	2	1	0	0	0	0
Troparyovo-Nikulino	10	0	9	1	0	0	0	0	0
Filyovsky Park	10	4	4	1	0	0	0	0	1
Fili-Davydkovo	10	7	0	1	2	0	0	0	0
Khamovniki	15	0	9	5	1	0	0	0	0
Khovrino	12	8	3	1	0	0	0	0	0
Khoroshyovo-Mnyovniki	15	10	2	0	3	0	0	0	0
Khoroshyovsky	10	4	4	1	1	0	0	0	0
Tsaritsyno	10	10	0	0	0	0	0	0	0
Cheryomushki	12	5	2	0	5	0	0	0	0
Chertanovo Severnoye	10	10	0	0	0	0	0	0	0
Chertanovo Tsentralnoye	10	10	0	0	0	0	0	0	0
Chertanovo Yuzhnoye	15	15	0	0	0	0	0	0	0
Yuzhnoye Butovo	12	12	0	0	0	0	0	0	0
Yuzhnoye Medvedkovo	10	10	0	0	0	0	0	0	0
Yuzhnoye Tushino	12	11	0	1	0	0	0	0	0
Yuzhnoportovy	10	10	0	0	0	0	0	0	0
Yakimanka	10	1	9	0	0	0	0	0	0
Yaroslavsky	12	12	0	0	0	0	0	0	0
Yasenevo	15	15	0	0	0	0	0	0	0
Troitsk	20	19	0	1	0	0	0	0	0
Total	1502	1153	176	108	44	10	5	4	2
