= Moscow City Duma District 6 =

Moscow City Duma electoral constituency

- Moscow City Duma constituency
- Deputy: Nadezhda Perfilova; United Russia
- Administrative Okrug: Northern
- Districts: part of Beskudnikovsky, Dmitrovsky, Vostochnoye Degunino, part of Zapadnoye Degunino
- Voters: 191,340 (2024)

Moscow City Duma District 6 is one of 45 constituencies in Moscow City Duma. The district covers outer parts of Northern Moscow.

The district has been represented since 2024 by United Russia deputy Nadezhda Perfilova, (Note: member of My Moscow faction in 2014–2019) a school principal and three-term member, who was redistricted from District 7.

== Boundaries ==
District boundaries from 2014 to 2024

1993–1997: Begovoy, Koptevo, Savyolovsky, Timiryazevsky
The district covered inner parts of Northern Moscow.

1997–2005: Begovoy, Koptevo, Savyolovsky, Timiryazevsky, TEOS TSKhA (Note: merged into Timiryazevsky District in 2002)
The district was unchanged with Timiryazev Academy being elevated to a separate administrative division status.

2005–2009: Bogorodskoye, Golyanovo, Izmaylovo, Metrogorodok, Preobrazhenskoye, Severnoye Izmaylovo, part of Sokolniki, Vostochnoye Izmaylovo, Vostochny
The district was completely reconfigured as it was placed into Eastern Moscow, overlapping the then-eliminated State Duma Preobrazhensky constituency.

2009–2014: Bogorodskoye, Golyanovo, Izmaylovo, Metrogorodok, Preobrazhenskoye, Severnoye Izmaylovo, Vostochnoye Izmaylovo, Vostochny
The district was lightly rearranged prior to the 2009 election, losing Sokolniki to District 5.

2014–2024: Golovinsky, Khovrino, Levoberezhny, part of Zapadnoye Degunino
The district was completely rearranged in the 2014 redistricting as it was moved to cover outer parts of Northern Moscow.

2024–present: part of Beskudnikovsky, Dmitrovsky, Vostochnoye Degunino, part of Zapadnoye Degunino
During the 2023–24 Moscow redistricting all of the former district was renumbered District 5. In its new configuration the district took all of former District 7.

== Members elected ==
Election	Member	Party
1993	Irina Rukina	Choice of Russia
1997	Irina Rukina	Independent
2001	Irina Rukina	Union of Right Forces
2005	Andrey Metelsky	United Russia
2009	Andrey Metelsky	United Russia
2014	Nadezhda Babkina	United Russia
2019	Yevgeny Bunimovich	Yabloko
2024	Nadezhda Perfilova	United Russia

== Election results ==
=== 2001 ===
Summary of the 16 December 2001 Moscow City Duma election in District 6
Candidate	Party	Votes	%
Irina Rukina (incumbent)	Union of Right Forces	18,018	33.67%
Aleksandr Andreyev	Independent	12,338	23.06%
Yury Kotov	Communist Party	7,899	14.76%
Vladimir Yatsenko	Independent	5,766	10.78%
Shamun Kagermanov	Independent	979	1.83%
against all		5,875	10.98%
Total		54,038	100%

=== 2005 ===
Summary of the 4 December 2005 Moscow City Duma election in District 6
Candidate	Party	Votes	%
Andrey Metelsky (incumbent) (Note: redistricted from District 14)	United Russia	72,305	46.02%
Valentina Prisyazhnyuk (incumbent) (Note: redistricted from District 12)	Independent	37,534	23.89%
Dmitry Shchavelev	Russian Party of Life	13,208	8.41%
Kirill Prokofyev	Liberal Democratic Party	9,072	5.77%
Vladislav Paramzin	Independent	7,571	4.82%
Total		157,119	100%

=== 2009 ===
Summary of the 11 October 2009 Moscow City Duma election in District 6
Candidate	Party	Votes	%
Andrey Metelsky (incumbent)	United Russia	91,328	64.26%
Vladimir Koshelev	Communist Party	22,867	16.09%
Miras Tulepov	A Just Russia	8,103	5.70%
Kirill Strebkov	Liberal Democratic Party	7,734	5.44%
Oleg Alekseyev	Independent	6,838	4.81%
Total		142,126	100%

=== 2014 ===
Summary of the 14 September 2014 Moscow City Duma election in District 6
Candidate	Party	Votes	%
Nadezhda Babkina	United Russia	13,509	36.91%
Sergey Grigorov	Yabloko	8,759	23.93%
Boris Yeliseyev	A Just Russia	5,994	16.38%
Nadezhda Barynina	Communist Party	5,406	14.77%
Tamara Lopareva	Liberal Democratic Party	1,673	4.57%
Total		36,595	100%

=== 2019 ===
Summary of the 8 September 2019 Moscow City Duma election in District 6
Candidate	Party	Votes	%
Yevgeny Bunimovich	Yabloko	16,732	40.56%
Mikhail Balykhin	Independent	11,449	27.75%
Aleksey Melnikov	Communist Party	6,921	16.78%
Natalya Krutskikh	Communists of Russia	2,496	6.05%
Aleksey Pochernin	Liberal Democratic Party	2,341	5.67%
Total		41,255	100%

=== 2024 ===
Summary of the 6–8 September 2024 Moscow City Duma election in District 6
Candidate	Party	Votes	%
Nadezhda Perfilova (incumbent) (Note: redistricted from District 7)	United Russia	43,166	54.09%
Viktoria Aleynikova	A Just Russia – For Truth	11,862	14.86%
Maksim Konkin	Communist Party	9,523	11.93%
Valery Limet	New People	7,122	8.92%
Marsel Dyuran	Liberal Democratic Party	4,222	5.29%
Nikolay Ageyev	Independent	3,896	4.88%
Total		79,807	100%
