= Preobrazhensky constituency =

Russian legislative constituency

Preobrazhensky single-member constituency
- Constituency of the Russian State Duma

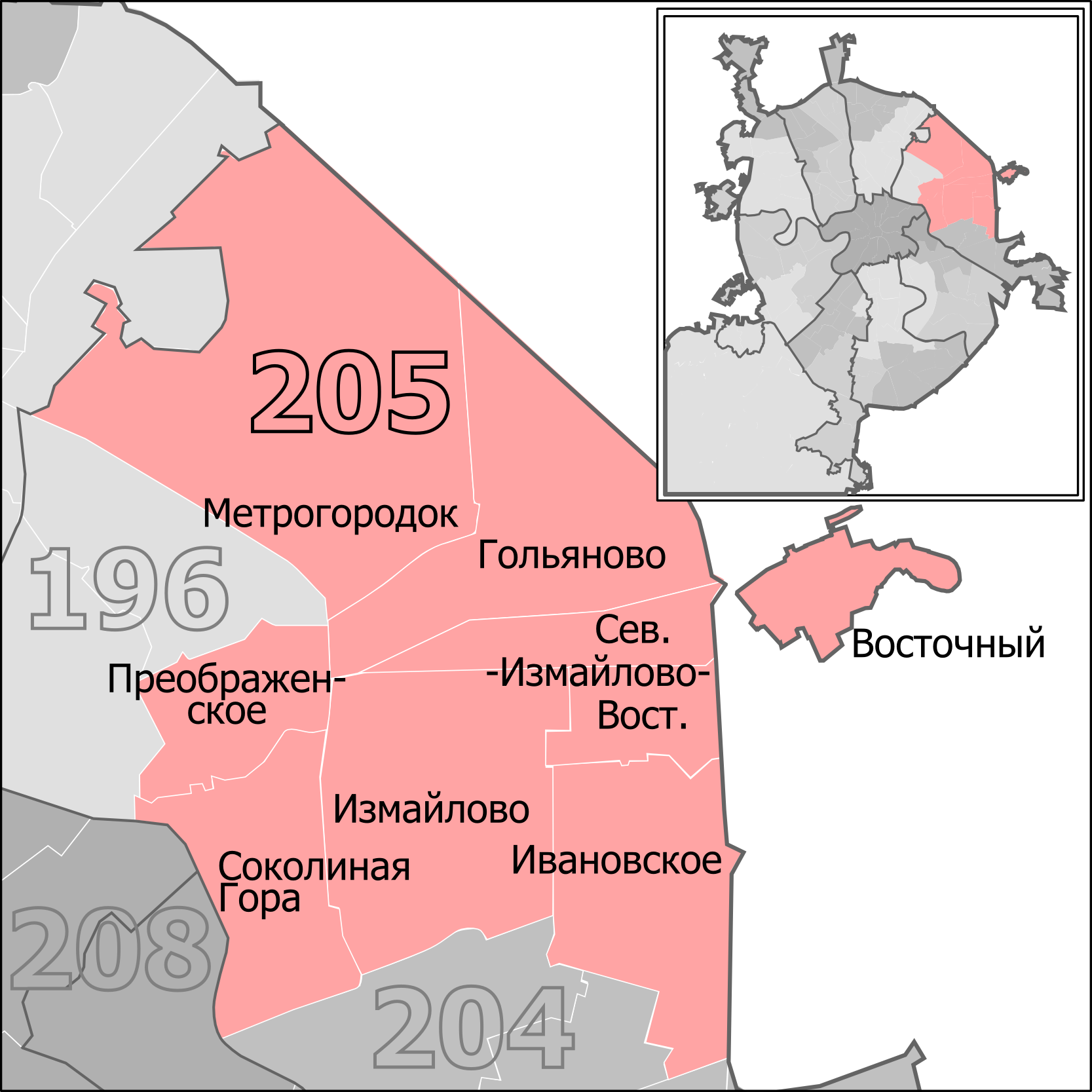
- Constituency boundaries since 2016
- Deputy: Vladislav Tretiak; United Russia
- Federal subject: Moscow
- Districts: Eastern AO (Golyanovo, Ivanovskoye, Izmaylovo, Metrogorodok, Preobrazhenskoye, Severnoye Izmaylovo, Sokolinaya Gora, Vostochnoye Izmaylovo, Vostochny)
- Voters: 468,156 (2026)

The Preobrazhensky constituency (No.204 (Note: No.198 in 1993-1995, No.199 in 1995-2007, No.205 in 2016–2026)) is a Russian legislative constituency in Moscow. The constituency covers northern and central Eastern Moscow.

The constituency has been represented since 2026 by United Russia deputy Vladislav Tretiak, six-term State Duma member, 1972, 1976 and 1984 Olympic Champion ice hockey player, who won the open seat, succeeding one-term A Just Russia incumbent Anatoly Wasserman.

== Boundaries ==
1993–1995: Eastern Administrative Okrug (Bogorodskoye District, Golyanovo District, Izmaylovo District, Metrogorodok District, Preobrazhenskoye District, Severnoye Izmaylovo District, Sokolniki District, Vostochny District)
The constituency covered northern half of Eastern Moscow.

1995–2007: Eastern Administrative Okrug (Bogorodskoye District, Golyanovo District, Izmaylovo District, Metrogorodok District, Preobrazhenskoye District, Severnoye Izmaylovo District, Vostochnoye Izmaylovo District, Vostochny District)
After the 1995 redistricting the constituency was slightly changed, losing Sokolniki to Babushkinsky constituency. This seat instead gained Vostochnoye Izmaylovo from Perovo constituency.

2016–present: Eastern Administrative Okrug (Golyanovo District, Ivanovskoye District, Izmaylovo District, Metrogorodok District, Preobrazhenskoye District, Severnoye Izmaylovo District, Sokolinaya Gora District, Vostochnoye Izmaylovo District, Vostochny District)
The constituency was re-created for the 2016 election and retained most of its former territory, losing Bogorodskoye to Babushkinsky constituency. This seat instead gained Ivanovskoye and Sokolinaya Gora from Perovo constituency.

== Members elected ==
Election	Member	Party
1993	Aleksandr Zhukov (Note: in 2004 appointed as Deputy Prime Minister of Russia)	Dignity and Charity
1995	Aleksandr Zhukov	Forward, Russia!
1999	Aleksandr Zhukov	Fatherland – All Russia
2003	Aleksandr Zhukov	United Russia
2005	Sergey Shavrin	United Russia
2007	Proportional representation - no election by constituency	
2011	Proportional representation - no election by constituency	
2016	Anton Zharkov	United Russia
2021	Anatoly Wasserman	Independent
2026	Vladislav Tretiak	United Russia

== Election results ==
=== 1993 ===
Summary of the 12 December 1993 Russian legislative election in the Preobrazhensky constituency
Candidate	Party	Votes	%
Aleksandr Zhukov	Dignity and Charity	62,407	23.57%
Andrey Frolov	Yavlinsky—Boldyrev—Lukin	42,237	15.95%
Vladimir Katin	Independent	28,397	10.72%
Aleksandr Andreyev	Communist Party	21,623	8.17%
Mikhail Maley	Party of Russian Unity and Accord	15,755	5.95%
Viktor Vishnyakov	Liberal Democratic Party	11,365	4.29%
Eduard Myslovsky	Kedr	9,618	3.63%
Andrey Lagunov	Civic Union	5,785	2.18%
against all		51,126	19.31%
Total		264,820	100%

=== 1995 ===
Summary of the 17 December 1995 Russian legislative election in the Preobrazhensky constituency
Candidate	Party	Votes	%
Aleksandr Zhukov (incumbent)	Forward, Russia!	44,203	15.49%
Valery Loginov	Communist Party	35,154	12.32%
Irina Osokina	Independent	32,872	11.52%
Valery Kuzin	Independent	29,425	10.31%
Andrey Frolov	Democratic Russia and Free Trade Unions	13,697	4.80%
Tamara Solomatina	Stanislav Govorukhin Bloc	12,590	4.41%
Mikhail Chelnokov	Independent	12,344	4.32%
Vladimir Pukhov	Independent	8,096	2.84%
Gasan Mirzoyev	Russian Lawyers' Association	7,818	2.74%
Aleksandr Filatov	Liberal Democratic Party	6,901	2.42%
Anatoly Pchelintsev	Christian-Democratic Union - Christians of Russia	6,556	2.30%
Albert Miroshnikov	Agrarian Party	4,270	1.50%
Feliks Yemelin	Independent	4,182	1.47%
Olga Bukharkova	Independent	3,352	1.17%
Aleksandr Muzychenko	Faith, Work, Conscience	3,325	1.16%
German Khrustalyov	Independent	3,178	1.11%
Aleksandr Kotenkov	Party of Russian Unity and Accord	2,951	1.03%
Natalia Sidorova	Independent	2,657	0.93%
Oleg Novikov	Federal Democratic Movement	2,432	0.85%
Vyacheslav Astafyev	Independent	2,394	0.84%
Mikhail Kosarev	Social Democrats	2,040	0.71%
Aleksandr Obidin	Russian All-People's Movement	1,275	0.45%
against all		36,654	12.84%
Total		285,437	100%

=== 1999 ===
Summary of the 19 December 1999 Russian legislative election in the Preobrazhensky constituency
Candidate	Party	Votes	%
Aleksandr Zhukov (incumbent)	Fatherland – All Russia	131,130	46.38%
Arkady Baskayev	Independent	32,291	11.42%
Irina Osokina	Yabloko	20,403	7.22%
Andrey Kassirov	Communist Party	16,939	5.99%
Andrey Metelsky	Andrey Nikolayev and Svyatoslav Fyodorov Bloc	14,175	5.01%
Andrey Frolov	Union of Right Forces	12,021	4.25%
Oleg Denisov	Independent	4,794	1.70%
Anatoly Mostovoy	Congress of Russian Communities-Yury Boldyrev Movement	3,491	1.23%
Yelena Rumyantseva	Independent	3,137	1.11%
Lidia Basmanova	Spiritual Heritage	2,273	0.80%
Vladimir Ivanov	Independent	2,249	0.80%
Vladimir Petrov	Kedr	2,110	0.75%
Andrey Banov	Independent	1,264	0.45%
Vitaly Tyukov	Independent	1,178	0.42%
Anatoly Rabinovich	Independent	999	0.35%
against all		27,558	9.75%
Total		282,746	100%

=== 2003 ===
Summary of the 7 December 2003 Russian legislative election in the Preobrazhensky constituency
Candidate	Party	Votes	%
Aleksandr Zhukov (incumbent)	United Russia	156,932	65.55%
Valery Monakhov	Communist Party	16,067	6.71%
Anton Morozov	Liberal Democratic Party	7,554	3.16%
Georgy Minenko	Development of Enterprise	5,958	2.49%
German Khrustalyov	Independent	3,027	1.26%
Maksim Palashchenko	United Russian Party Rus'	2,463	1.03%
Leonid Shpigel	Independent	2,454	1.03%
against all		40,499	16.92%
Total		240,310	100%

=== 2004 ===
The results of the by-election were invalidated due to low turnout and another by-election was scheduled for 4 December 2005

Summary of the 5 December 2004 by-election in the Preobrazhensky constituency
Candidate	Party	Votes	%
Aleksandr Zhukov	United Russia	23,516	23.04%
Sergey Shavrin	Independent	19,967	19.56%
Sergey Mitrokhin	Yabloko	16,639	16.30%
Mikhail Dvornikov	Independent	7,820	7.66%
Yury Nazarov	Russian Communist Workers Party-Russian Party of Communists	7,708	7.55%
Mikhail Delyagin	Independent	3,968	3.88%
Andrey Cherepanov	Independent	3,091	3.02%
Aleksey Nazarov	Independent	2,732	2.67%
Anton Morozov	Liberal Democratic Party	2,169	2.12%
Pyotr Khomyakov	Independent	940	0.92%
Leonid Shpigel	Independent	728	0.71%
Ivan Grachev	Development of Enterprise	659	0.64%
Georgy Benyaguyev	Independent	371	0.36%
Andrey Priyatkin	Independent	290	0.28%
against all		9,680	9.48%
Total		102,061	100%

=== 2005 ===
Summary of the 4 December 2005 by-election in the Preobrazhensky constituency
Candidate	Party	Votes	%
Sergey Shavrin	United Russia	55,329	36.20%
Vladimir Kvachkov	Independent	44,167	28.89%
Yanina Perepechayeva	Independent	7,428	4.86%
Leonid Shpigel	Independent	5,751	3.76%
Maksim Shugaley	Independent	2,566	1.67%
against all		28,933	18.93%
Total		152,832	100%

=== 2016 ===
Summary of the 18 September 2016 Russian legislative election in the Preobrazhensky constituency
Candidate	Party	Votes	%
Anton Zharkov	United Russia	56,431	33.75%
Anatoly Wasserman	A Just Russia	32,379	19.37%
Nikolay Korsakov	Communist Party	17,032	10.19%
Olga Demicheva	Yabloko	16,708	9.99%
Andrey Kireyev	Liberal Democratic Party	13,458	8.05%
Yelena Barsukova	The Greens	6,311	3.77%
Arseny Belenky	Party of Growth	5,363	3.21%
Vadim Korovin	People's Freedom Party	4,198	2.51%
Konstantin Bely	Rodina	3,378	2.02%
Vadim Saltanovich	Communists of Russia	2,811	1.68%
Yevdokia Shlyapina	Civilian Power	1,849	1.11%
Dmitry Mashenskikh	Patriots of Russia	1,266	0.76%
Ivan Kononov	Civic Platform	1,155	0.69%
Total		167,199	100%

=== 2021 ===
Results by district: Anatoly Wasserman: 20–30% 30–40%; Sergey Obukhov: 30–40% 50–60%

Summary of the 17-19 September 2021 Russian legislative election in the Preobrazhensky constituency
Candidate	Party	Votes	%
Anatoly Wasserman	Independent	75,281	33.66%
Sergey Obukhov	Communist Party	54,062	24.18%
Alyona Popova	Yabloko	15,482	6.92%
Yulia Gladkova	Russian Party of Freedom and Justice	13,891	6.21%
Vyacheslav Demchenko	New People	13,669	6.11%
Anton Medvedev	Liberal Democratic Party	13,651	6.10%
Nadezhda Zagordan	Green Alternative	12,327	5.51%
Yaroslav Sidorov	Communists of Russia	7,245	3.24%
Marina Kostycheva	Rodina	5,814	2.60%
Natalya Koryagina	Party of Growth	3,919	1.75%
Nikita Ishchenko	Civic Platform	2,542	0.98%
Total		223,619	100%

=== 2026 ===
Summary of the 18-20 September 2026 Russian legislative election in the Preobrazhensky constituency
Candidate	Party	Votes	%
Vladislav Tretiak	United Russia	112,649	45.35%
Dmitry Medvedev	Communist Party	33,266	13.39%
Anna Shatunovskaya-Byurno	Yabloko	28,643	11.53%
Dmitry Voronin	New People	23,537	9.47%
Vsevolod Voronin	Liberal Democratic Party	18,134	7.30%
Igor Baranov	A Just Russia	14,964	6.02%
Anastasia Azarova	The Greens	10,762	4.33%
Tatyana Yatskevich	Party of Direct Democracy	5,520	2.22%
Total		248,426	100%
