= Kryukovo =

Kryukovo may refer to:

- Kryukovo District, a district in Zelenograd Administrative Okrug of Moscow, Russia
- Staroye Kryukovo District, a district in Zelenograd Administrative Okrug of Moscow, Russia
- Kryukovo railway station, main railway station in Zelenograd Administrative Okrug of Moscow, Russia
- Kryukovo, name of several rural localities in Russia
