= Administrative divisions of Moscow =

Divisions of Moscow, Russia

| Federal city of Moscow, Russia | Coat of arms of Moscow |
As of July 1, 2012:
| Number of city administrative okrugs (административных округов) | 12 |
| Number of administrative districts (районы) | 125 |
| Number of administrative settlements (поселения) | 21 |
| Number of municipal formations (intra-city territories of a federal city) | 146 |
| Number of municipal okrugs (муниципальных округов) | 125 |
| Number of municipal settlements (муниципальных поселения) | 19 |
| Number of urban okrugs (городских округов) | 2 |

Map of Moscow administrative okrugs: 1. Central Administrative Okrug; 2. Northern Administrative Okrug; 3. North-Eastern Administrative Okrug; 4. Eastern Administrative Okrug; 5. South-Eastern Administrative Okrug; 6. Southern Administrative Okrug; 7. South-Western Administrative Okrug; 8. Western Administrative Okrug; 9. North-Western Administrative Okrug; 10. Zelenogradsky Administrative Okrug; 11. Novomoskovsky Administrative Okrug; 12. Troitsky Administrative Okrug

The federal city of Moscow, Russia is divided into administrative districts called administrative okrugs, which are a subdivision of state administration. They are further divided into municipal formations called districts (raions) and settlements (poseleniy), which are local self-government entities.

== Overview ==
Administratively, the city is divided into 12 administrative okrugs, which in turn are subdivided into 146 administrative units, which include 125 administrative districts and 21 administrative settlements. Municipally, each of the 146 administrative units have municipal status as 125 municipal okrugs, 19 municipal settlements, and 2 urban okrugs. The municipalities of Shcherbinka and Troitsk are styled "urban okrugs" due to their former municipal status within the territory in Moscow Oblast which became New Moscow.

The city does not have a downtown area; the urban core is scattered across the city. Prominent business areas include Tverskoy, Arbat, and Presnensky Districts (the latter being home to the Moscow-City complex). Central Administrative Okrug as a whole has a large concentration of businesses. The city hall and major administration buildings are located in Tverskoy District (home to the Moscow Kremlin). Western Administrative Okrug is home to Moscow State University, Sparrow Hills and Mosfilm Studios, while North-Eastern hosts Ostankino Tower and VDNKh Exhibition Park. The total population of the Federal City of Moscow was 11,503,501 inhabitants at the Russian Census (2010).

On July 1, 2012, Moscow's land area grew by 1,490 sq km (580 sq mi), taking in territory from Moscow Oblast and called New Moscow.

== Administrative okrugs ==
=== Central Administrative Okrug ===
The territory of Kitay-gorod is not a part of any district and is governed directly by the administrative okrug.

| Name | Population | Map |
|---|---|---|
| Central Administrative Okrug (Центральный административный округ, Tsentralny administrativny okrug) | 701,353 | Central Okrug districts |
| Districts under the central administrative krug jurisdiction: | | Central Okrug districts |
| Arbat (Арбат) | 25,699 | Central Okrug districts |
| Basmanny (Басманный) | 100,899 | Central Okrug districts |
| Khamovniki (Хамовники) | 97,110 | Central Okrug districts |
| Krasnoselsky (Красносельский) | 45,229 | Central Okrug districts |
| Meshchansky (Мещанский) | 56,077 | Central Okrug districts |
| Presnensky (Пресненский) | 116,979 | Central Okrug districts |
| Tagansky (Таганский) | 109,993 | Central Okrug districts |
| Tverskoy (Тверской) | 75,955 | Central Okrug districts |
| Yakimanka (Якиманка) | 22,822 | Central Okrug districts |
| Zamoskvorechye (Замоскворечье) | 50,590 | Central Okrug districts |

=== Northern Administrative Okrug ===
| Name | Population | Map |
|---|---|---|
| Northern Administrative Okrug (Северный административный округ, Severny administrativny okrug) | 1,112,846 | Northern Okrug districts |
| Districts under the administrative okrug jurisdiction: | | Northern Okrug districts |
| Aeroport (Аэропорт) | 74,775 | Northern Okrug districts |
| Begovoy (Беговой) | 44,385 | Northern Okrug districts |
| Beskudnikovsky (Бескудниковский) | 74,790 | Northern Okrug districts |
| Dmitrovsky (Дмитровский) | 88,931 | Northern Okrug districts |
| Golovinsky (Головинский) | 102,160 | Northern Okrug districts |
| Khoroshyovsky (Хорошёвский) | 55,949 | Northern Okrug districts |
| Khovrino (Ховрино) | 79,092 | Northern Okrug districts |
| Koptevo (Коптево) | 97,989 | Northern Okrug districts |
| Levoberezhny (Левобережный) | 51,309 | Northern Okrug districts |
| Molzhaninovsky (Молжаниновский) | 2,929 | Northern Okrug districts |
| Savyolovsky (Савёловский) | 57,814 | Northern Okrug districts |
| Sokol (Сокол) | 57,317 | Northern Okrug districts |
| Timiryazevsky (Тимирязевский) | 84,098 | Northern Okrug districts |
| Vostochnoye Degunino (Восточное Дегунино) | 97,083 | Northern Okrug districts |
| Voykovsky (Войковский) | 67,470 | Northern Okrug districts |
| Zapadnoye Degunino (Западное Дегунино) | 76,756 | Northern Okrug districts |

=== North-Eastern Administrative Okrug ===
| Name | Population | Map |
|---|---|---|
| North-Eastern Administrative Okrug (Северо-Восточный административный округ, Severo-Vostochny administrativny okrug) | 1,240,062 | North Eastern Okrug districts |
| Districts under the administrative okrug jurisdiction: | | North Eastern Okrug districts |
| Alexeyevsky (Алексеевский) | 73,429 | North Eastern Okrug districts |
| Altufyevsky (Алтуфьевский) | 50,091 | North Eastern Okrug districts |
| Babushkinsky (Бабушкинский) | 77,491 | North Eastern Okrug districts |
| Bibirevo (Бибирево) | 151,334 | North Eastern Okrug districts |
| Butyrsky (Бутырский) | 60,922 | North Eastern Okrug districts |
| Lianozovo (Лианозово) | 76,465 | North Eastern Okrug districts |
| Losinoostrovsky (Лосиноостровский) | 72,640 | North Eastern Okrug districts |
| Marfino (Марфино) | 23,971 | North Eastern Okrug districts |
| Maryina roshcha (Марьина роща) | 60,194 | North Eastern Okrug districts |
| Ostankinsky (Останкинский) | 57,707 | North Eastern Okrug districts |
| Otradnoye (Отрадное) | 168,972 | North Eastern Okrug districts |
| Rostokino (Ростокино) | 35,134 | North Eastern Okrug districts |
| Severnoye Medvedkovo (Северное Медведково) | 111,804 | North Eastern Okrug districts |
| Severny (Северный) | 9,629 | North Eastern Okrug districts |
| Sviblovo (Свиблово) | 52,824 | North Eastern Okrug districts |
| Yaroslavsky (Ярославский) | 84,739 | North Eastern Okrug districts |
| Yuzhnoye Medvedkovo (Южное Медведково) | 72,716 | North Eastern Okrug districts |

=== Eastern Administrative Okrug ===
| Name | Population | Map |
|---|---|---|
| Eastern Administrative Okrug (Восточный административный округ, Vostochny administrativny okrug) | 1,394,497 | Eastern Okrug districts |
| Districts under the administrative okrug jurisdiction: | | Eastern Okrug districts |
| Bogorodskoye (Богородское) | 98,602 | Eastern Okrug districts |
| Golyanovo (Гольяново) | 159,147 | Eastern Okrug districts |
| Ivanovskoye (Ивановское) | 127,905 | Eastern Okrug districts |
| Izmaylovo (Измайлово) | 110,099 | Eastern Okrug districts |
| Kosino-Ukhtomsky (Косино-Ухтомский) | 16,917 | Eastern Okrug districts |
| Metrogorodok (Метрогородок) | 37,283 | Eastern Okrug districts |
| Novogireyevo (Новогиреево) | 95,183 | Eastern Okrug districts |
| Novokosino (Новокосино) | 97,927 | Eastern Okrug districts |
| Perovo (Перово) | 135,095 | Eastern Okrug districts |
| Preobrazhenskoye (Преображенское) | 80,827 | Eastern Okrug districts |
| Severnoye Izmaylovo (Северное Измайлово) | 80,785 | Eastern Okrug districts |
| Sokolinaya gora (Соколиная гора) | 85,056 | Eastern Okrug districts |
| Sokolniki (Сокольники) | 54,975 | Eastern Okrug districts |
| Veshnyaki (Вешняки) | 126,546 | Eastern Okrug districts |
| Vostochnoye Izmaylovo (Восточное Измайлово) | 75,450 | Eastern Okrug districts |
| Vostochny (Восточный) | 12,700 | Eastern Okrug districts |

=== South-Eastern Administrative Okrug ===
| Name | Population | |
|---|---|---|
| South-Eastern Administrative Okrug (Юго-Восточный административный округ, Yugo-Vostochny administrativny okrug) | 1,116,924 | South Eastern Okrug districts |
| Districts under the administrative okrug jurisdiction: | | South Eastern Okrug districts |
| Kapotnya (Капотня) | 27,828 | South Eastern Okrug districts |
| Kuzminki (Кузьминки) | 122,951 | South Eastern Okrug districts |
| Lefortovo (Лефортово) | 87,560 | South Eastern Okrug districts |
| Lyublino (Люблино) | 132,331 | South Eastern Okrug districts |
| Maryino (Марьино) | 206,388 | South Eastern Okrug districts |
| Nekrasovka (Некрасовка) | 7,803 | South Eastern Okrug districts |
| Nizhegorodsky (Нижегородский) | 38,756 | South Eastern Okrug districts |
| Pechatniki (Печатники) | 71,383 | South Eastern Okrug districts |
| Ryazansky (Рязанский) | 89,270 | South Eastern Okrug districts |
| Tekstilshchiki (Текстильщики) | 87,849 | South Eastern Okrug districts |
| Vykhino-Zhulebino (Выхино-Жулебино) | 184,749 | South Eastern Okrug districts |
| Yuzhnoportovy (Южнопортовый) | 60,056 | South Eastern Okrug districts |

=== Southern Administrative Okrug ===
| Name | Population | |
|---|---|---|
| Southern Administrative Okrug (Южный административный округ, Yuzhny administrativny okrug) | 1,593,065 | Southern Okrug districts |
| Districts under the administrative okrug jurisdiction: | | Southern Okrug districts |
| Biryulyovo Vostochnoye (Бирюлёво Восточное) | 129,700 | Southern Okrug districts |
| Biryulyovo Zapadnoye (Бирюлёво Западное) | 83,303 | Southern Okrug districts |
| Brateyevo (Братеево) | 94,644 | Southern Okrug districts |
| Chertanovo Severnoye (Чертаново Северное) | 104,613 | Southern Okrug districts |
| Chertanovo Tsentralnoye (Чертаново Центральное) | 104,042 | Southern Okrug districts |
| Chertanovo Yuzhnoye (Чертаново Южное) | 133,008 | Southern Okrug districts |
| Danilovsky (Даниловский) | 90,265 | Southern Okrug districts |
| Donskoy (Донской) | 45,477 | Southern Okrug districts |
| Moskvorechye-Saburovo (Москворечье-Сабурово) | 67,257 | Southern Okrug districts |
| Nagatino-Sadovniki (Нагатино-Садовники) | 69,031 | Southern Okrug districts |
| Nagatinsky zaton (Нагатинский затон) | 105,948 | Southern Okrug districts |
| Nagorny (Нагорный) | 69,535 | Southern Okrug districts |
| Orekhovo-Borisovo Severnoye (Орехово-Борисово Северное) | 121,402 | Southern Okrug districts |
| Orekhovo-Borisovo Yuzhnoye (Орехово-Борисово Южное) | 137,965 | Southern Okrug districts |
| Tsaritsyno (Царицыно) | 115,708 | Southern Okrug districts |
| Zyablikovo (Зябликово) | 121,197 | Southern Okrug districts |

=== South-Western Administrative Okrug ===
| Name | Population | |
|---|---|---|
| South-Western Administrative Okrug (Юго-Западный административный округ, Yugo-Zapadny administrativny okrug) | 1,179,211 | South Western Okrug districts |
| Districts under the administrative okrug jurisdiction: | | South Western Okrug districts |
| Akademichesky (Академический) | 96,172 | South Western Okrug districts |
| Cheryomushki (Черёмушки) | 89,264 | South Western Okrug districts |
| Gagarinsky (Гагаринский) | 72,072 | South Western Okrug districts |
| Konkovo (Коньково) | 138,757 | South Western Okrug districts |
| Kotlovka (Котловка) | 58,666 | South Western Okrug districts |
| Lomonosovsky (Ломоносовский) | 81,851 | South Western Okrug districts |
| Obruchevsky (Обручевский) | 63,484 | South Western Okrug districts |
| Severnoye Butovo (Северное Бутово) | 75,045 | South Western Okrug districts |
| Tyoply Stan (Тёплый Стан) | 112,733 | South Western Okrug districts |
| Yasenevo (Ясенево) | 174,236 | South Western Okrug districts |
| Yuzhnoye Butovo (Южное Бутово) | 105,212 | South Western Okrug districts |
| Zyuzino (Зюзино) | 111,719 | South Western Okrug districts |

=== Western Administrative Okrug ===
| Name | Population | Photos |
|---|---|---|
| Western Administrative Okrug (Западный административный округ, Zapadny administrativny okrug) | 1,049,104 | Western Okrug districts |
| Districts under the administrative okrug jurisdiction: | | Western Okrug districts |
| Dorogomilovo (Дорогомилово) | 59,732 | Western Okrug districts |
| Filyovsky park (Филёвский парк) | 66,775 | Western Okrug districts |
| Fili-Davydkovo (Фили-Давыдково) | 92,965 | Western Okrug districts |
| Krylatskoye (Крылатское) | 76,261 | Western Okrug districts |
| Kuntsevo (Кунцево) | 125,100 | Western Okrug districts |
| Mozhaysky (Можайский) | 109,248 | Western Okrug districts |
| Novo-Peredelkino (Ново-Переделкино) | 86,755 | Western Okrug districts |
| Ochakovo-Matveyevskoye (Очаково-Матвеевское) | 90,576 | Western Okrug districts |
| Prospekt Vernadskogo (Проспект Вернадского) | 56,564 | Western Okrug districts |
| Ramenki (Раменки) | 101,485 | Western Okrug districts |
| Solntsevo (Солнцево) | 85,642 | Western Okrug districts |
| Troparyovo-Nikulino (Тропарёво-Никулино) | 77,901 | Western Okrug districts |
| Vnukovo (Внуково) | 20,100 | Western Okrug districts |

=== North-Western Administrative Okrug ===
| Name | Population | Photos |
|---|---|---|
| North-Western Administrative Okrug (Северо-Западный административный округ, Severo-Zapadny administrativny okrug) | 779,965 | North Western Okrug districts |
| Districts under the administrative okrug jurisdiction: | | North Western Okrug districts |
| Khoroshyovo-Mnyovniki (Хорошёво-Мнёвники) | 146,968 | North Western Okrug districts |
| Kurkino (Куркино) | 2,339 | North Western Okrug districts |
| Mitino (Митино) | 138,371 | North Western Okrug districts |
| Pokrovskoye-Streshnevo (Покровское-Стрешнево) | 46,707 | North Western Okrug districts |
| Severnoye Tushino (Северное Тушино) | 138,533 | North Western Okrug districts |
| Shchukino (Щукино) | 89,454 | North Western Okrug districts |
| Strogino (Строгино) | 124,149 | North Western Okrug districts |
| Yuzhnoye Tushino (Южное Тушино) | 93,444 | North Western Okrug districts |

=== Zelenogradsky Administrative Okrug ===
| Name | Population (2010) | Photos |
|---|---|---|
| City of Zelenograd (город Зеленоград, Gorod Zelenograd) | 221,712 | Zelenograd districts |
| Districts under the administrative okrug jurisdiction: | | Zelenograd districts |
| Matushkino (Матушкино), formerly 'Number 1' | | Zelenograd districts |
| Savyolki (Савёлки), formerly 'Number 2' | | Zelenograd districts |
| Staroye Kryukovo (Старое Крюково), formerly 'Number 3' | | Zelenograd districts |
| Silino (Силино), formerly 'Number 4' | | Zelenograd districts |
| Kryukovo (Крюково) | 85,219 | Zelenograd districts |

=== Novomoskovsky Administrative Okrug ===
| Name | Population | Photos |
|---|---|---|
| Novomoskovsky Administrative Okrug (Новомосковский административный округ, Novomoskovsky administrativny okrug) | 113,569 | Novomoskovsky Administrative Okrug |
| Settlements under the administrative okrug jurisdiction: | | Novomoskovsky Administrative Okrug |
| Vnukovskoye Settlement (Поселение Внуковское) | | Novomoskovsky Administrative Okrug |
| Voskresenskoye Settlement (Поселение Воскресенское) | | Novomoskovsky Administrative Okrug |
| Desyonovskoye Settlement (Поселение Десёновское) | | Novomoskovsky Administrative Okrug |
| Kokoshkino Settlement (Поселение Кокошкино) | | Novomoskovsky Administrative Okrug |
| Marushkinskoye Settlement (Поселение Марушкинское) | | Novomoskovsky Administrative Okrug |
| Moskovsky Settlement (Поселение Московский) | | Novomoskovsky Administrative Okrug |
| Mosrentgen Settlement (Поселение Мосрентген) | | Novomoskovsky Administrative Okrug |
| Ryazanovskoye Settlement (Поселение Рязановское) | | Novomoskovsky Administrative Okrug |
| Sosenskoye Settlement (Поселение Сосенское) | | Novomoskovsky Administrative Okrug |
| Filimonkovskoye Settlement (Поселение Филимонковское) | | Novomoskovsky Administrative Okrug |
| Shcherbinka Settlement (Щербинка) | | Novomoskovsky Administrative Okrug |

=== Troitsky Administrative Okrug ===
| Name | Population | Photos |
|---|---|---|
| Troitsky Administrative Okrug (Троицкий административный округ, Troitsky administrativny okrug) | 86,752 | Troitsky Administrative Okrug |
| Settlements under the administrative okrug jurisdiction: | | Troitsky Administrative Okrug |
| Voronovskoye Settlement (Поселение Вороновское) | | Troitsky Administrative Okrug |
| Kiyevsky Settlement (Поселение Киевский) | | Troitsky Administrative Okrug |
| Klenovskoye Settlement (Поселение Клёновское) | | Troitsky Administrative Okrug |
| Krasnopakhorskoye Settlement (Поселение Краснопахорское) | | Troitsky Administrative Okrug |
| Mikhaylovo-Yartsevskoye Settlement (Поселение Михайлово-Ярцевское) | | Troitsky Administrative Okrug |
| Novofyodorovskoye Settlement (Поселение Новофёдоровское) | | Troitsky Administrative Okrug |
| Pervomayskoye Settlement (Поселение Первомайское) | | Troitsky Administrative Okrug |
| Rogovskoye Settlement (Поселение Роговское) | | Troitsky Administrative Okrug |
| Troitsky Settlement (Поселение Троицк) | | Troitsky Administrative Okrug |
| Shchapovskoye Settlement (Поселение Щаповское) | | Troitsky Administrative Okrug |

== Territorial units with special status ==
Former territorial units with special status (Russian: территориальная единица с особым статусом, ТЕОС) which existed in 1995–2002, and were not part of the districts in which they were located:

- Bitsa Park, Moscow
- Izmaylovsky Park
- Losiny Ostrov National Park
- Sokolniki Park
- ZIL
- Zelenogradskaya
- Moscow State University
- Sheremetyevsky
- Southwestern Center of Science and Industry
- Vodny Stadion
- Moscow International Business Center
- Kuzminki–Lyublino
- Kitay-gorod

All territorial units with special status were merged into districts in 2002.

== History ==
Territorial changes in 1922–1995

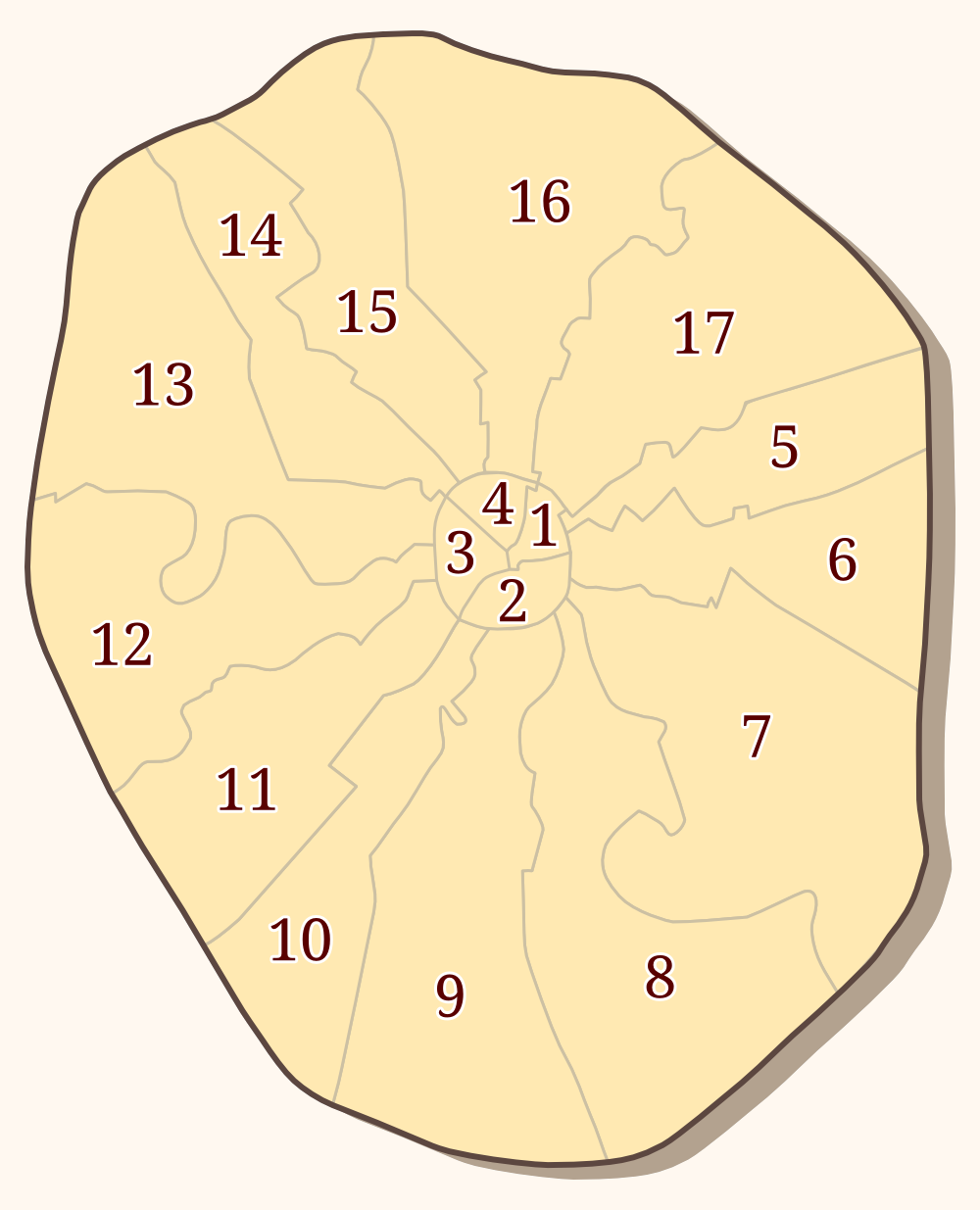
Moscow districts in 1960

=== Russian Soviet Federative Socialist Republic ===
1917–1920

In 1917 Moscow was divided into 8 districts. In October 1917 Moscow was divided into 11 districts.

1920–1936

In 1936 Moscow was divided into 7 districts.

1936–1960

In 1936 Moscow was divided into 23 districts.

1960–1969

In 1960 Moscow was divided into 17 districts.

1969–1991

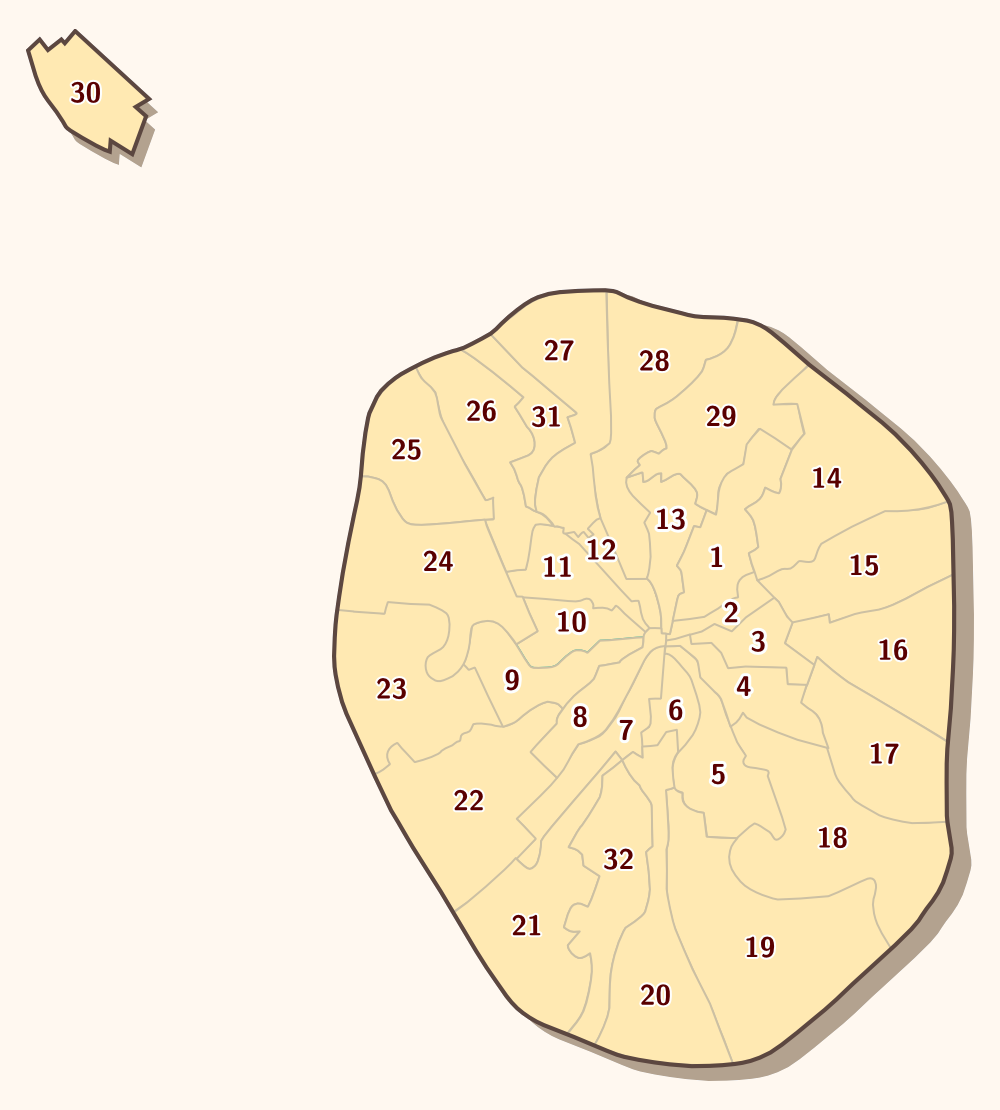
Moscow districts in 1978

In 1969 Moscow was divided into 30 districts:

- Central part of Moscow

1. Sokolnichesky
2. Baumansky
3. Kalininsky
4. Zhdanovsky
5. Proletarsky
6. Moskvoretsky
7. Oktyabrsky
8. Leninsky
9. Kievsky
10. Krasnopresnensky
11. Frunzensky
12. Sverdlovsky
13. Dzerzhinsky
  - Other districts within the Moscow Ring Road
14. Kuybyshevsky
15. Pervomaysky
16. Perovsky
17. Volgogradsky
18. Lyublinsky
19. Krasnogvardeysky
20. Sovetsky
21. Cheryomushkinsky
22. Gagarinsky
23. Kuntsevsky
24. Khoroshyovsky (later renamed Voroshilovsky, and then back to Khoroshyovsky)
25. Tushinsky
26. Leningradsky
27. Timiryazevsky
28. Kirovsky
29. Babushkinsky
  - outside the Moscow Ring Road:
30. Zelenogradsky

In 1977, Zheleznodorozhny and Sevastopolsky Districts were established. Sevastopolsky District was split off Sovetsky and Cheryomushkinsky Districts, whereas Zheleznodorozhny District was split off Kirovsky and Timiryazevsky Districts.

In 1984, a number of localities which previously belonged to Moscow Oblast were appended to Moscow. In particular, the town of Solntsevo was transferred to Moscow, and Solntsevsky District was established.

=== Russian Federation ===
Parts of Moscow Oblast's territory, including the towns of Troitsk, Moskovsky, and Shcherbinka, as well as parts of the territories of Leninsky, Naro-Fominsky, and Podolsky Districts, were transferred to Moscow on July 1, 2012. The new territories have been organized into two new administrative okrugs—Novomoskovsky and Troitsky.
