= Anatoly Wasserman =

Russian journalist and politician (born 1952)

Anatoly Wasserman MP
- Анатолий Вассерман
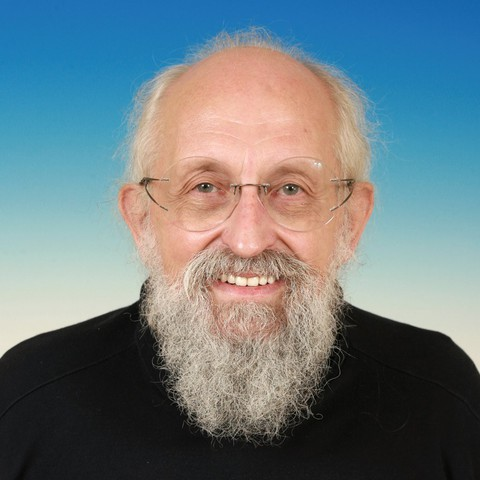
- Official portrait, c. 2021

Member of the State Duma for Moscow
- Incumbent
- Assumed office 12 October 2021
- Preceded by: Anton Zharkov
- Constituency: Preobrazhensky (No. 205)

Personal details
- Born: December 9, 1952 (age 73) Odesa, Ukrainian SSR, Soviet Union
- Citizenship: Soviet (1952–1991); Ukrainian (1991–2016); Russian (since 2016)
- Party: A Just Russia
- Occupation: computer scientist; journalist
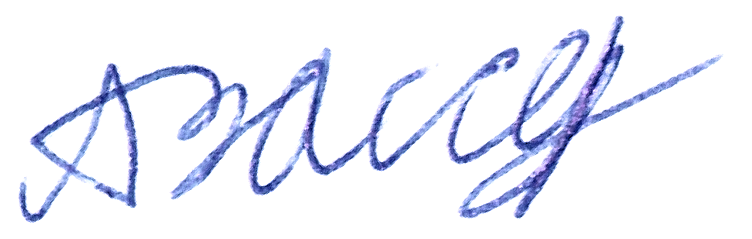
- Signature
- Website: vassermans.ru
- Anatoly Wasserman's voice Wasserman on the Echo of Moscow program, 5 February 2012

Anatoly Aleksandrovich Wasserman (Note: Also transliterated Anatoly Alexandrovich Vasserman; Russian: Анато́лий Алекса́ндрович Ва́ссерман, Ukrainian: Анатолій Олександрович Вассерман, romanized: Anatoliy Oleksandrovych Vasserman,) (born 9 December 1952) is a Russian politician, journalist and political pundit who has won numerous television intellectual quiz shows. Since September 2021 he is a member of the State Duma of the Russian Federation (the 8th convocation).

== Biography ==
Wasserman studied thermal physics at the Institute of refrigeration and cryotechnologies in Odessa, specializing also in computer programming. In 1974—1991 he was employed as a programmer at different R&D centers in Odessa dealing with low-temperature food technologies.

Wasserman has worked as a journalist since 23 November 1991 to the present (from 1996 to 1999, for computer magazines in particular).

In 1994, he ran for office as a Deputy of the Verkhovna Rada of Ukraine and took second place in his constituency.

After the annexation of Crimea by the Russian Federation in 2014 and the start of the 2014 to present Russo-Ukrainian War, Wasserman became increasingly critical of the Ukrainian government. In 2015 the Security Service of Ukraine opened a criminal investigation against him for alleged separatist activity.

On 27 January 2016, Wasserman became a naturalized Russian citizen (with citizenship granted by Vladimir Putin).

On 27 June 2016, he was nominated as a candidate for Deputy of the State Duma of Russia from the party A Just Russia; he took the second place in his constituency.

Wasserman advised Dmitry Medvedev not to experiment on Russians after Medvedev proposed beginning a gradual transition to a shorter working week, starting with an experiment on the territory of one region or on a group of companies. According to the publicist, without accurate economic calculations, this can result in a reduction in wages. Wasserman noted that "we do not need experiments, but concrete calculations". It is necessary to calculate whether the increase in labor productivity will compensate for the loss of one working day, because otherwise, the salary of citizens will fall, the journalist explained.

In 2021 Wasserman again ran for election to the State Duma, this time as an independent candidate. As in 2016, he ran in the Preobrazhensky constituency of Moscow; Moscow Mayor Sergey Sobyanin publicly endorsed his candidacy. In addition, the ruling United Russia party also did not nominate a candidate in this constituency. Wasserman won the seat, defeating the CPRF candidate Sergei Obukhov.

=== Sanctions ===
Wasserman is sanctioned by the UK government on 11 March 2022 in relation to the Russo-Ukrainian War.
