= Nizhegorodsky =

Nizhegorodsky (masculine), Nizhegorodskaya (feminine), or Nizhegorodskoye (neuter) may refer to:

- Nizhegorodsky District, name of several districts and city districts in Russia
- Nizhny Novgorod Oblast (Nizhegorodskaya oblast), a federal subject of Russia
- Nizhegorodskaya (rural locality), a rural locality (a stanitsa) in Krasnodar Krai, Russia
- Nizhegorodskaya (Moscow Metro), a station on the Moscow Metro
- Nizhegorodskaya (Moscow Central Circle), a station on the Moscow Railway
- Nizhegorodskaya railway station, on the Gorkovsky suburban railway line in Moscow
- Nizhegorodsky (family), a princely family of Rurikid stock
- 48th Nizhegorodsky Reconnaissance Regiment, air unit of the Soviet Air Forces

== See also ==
- Nizhny Novgorod
