= Nizhegorodsky District =

Nizhegorodsky District (Russian: Нижегородский райо́н) is the name of several districts in Russia.

== Districts of the federal subjects ==
Location of Moscow in Russia

- Nizhegorodsky District, Moscow, a district in South-Eastern Administrative Okrug of the federal city of Moscow

== City divisions ==
- Nizhegorodsky City District, Nizhny Novgorod, a city district of Nizhny Novgorod, the administrative center of Nizhny Novgorod Oblast
Location of Nizhny Novgorod in Russia

== See also ==
- Nizhegorodsky (disambiguation)
