= Irina Rukina =

Russian Feminist and Political Official

Irina Mikhailonova Rukina
- Ирина Михайлонова Рукина
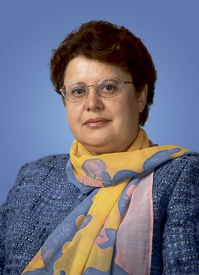
- Born: January 13, 1948 (age 78); Moscow, Soviet Union
- Education: Doctor of Economics
- Organization: Moscow City Duma
- Political party: A Just Russia – For Truth
- Movement: Women's Movement of Russia
- Awards: Order "For Merit to the Fatherland", Medal "In Commemoration of the 850th Anniversary of Moscow"

Irina Mikhailonova Rukina (Russian: Ирина Михайловна Рукина; born January 13, 1948) is a Russian economist, and political figure and a deputy of the Moscow City Duma of the first 3 convocations. She is a member of the Women's Movement of Russia.

== Public and political activities ==
Irina has been a part of 4 political parties. The following being in chronological order are;

- Democratic Choice of Russia (1994-2001)
- Union of Right Forces (2001-2002)
- Russian Party of Life (2003-2006)
- A Just Russia - For Truth (2006-2007)

Each varying politically from each other.

At the convocations she attended of the Moscow City Duma; she was a member of DCR.

She is reported being against inflation; saying women can help fix the issue.

The problem of employment, fear of loosing[sic] the job stands very sharp now. Prices for food, clothes, medicines, and public utilities are rising - very difficult. I would like to say them: "Be patient, dear, just wait a couple of years and everything will be wonderful." However, I cannot assume such a responsibility. I know only, that women themselves can contribute to the better future

— Irina Rukina
