= Savyolki District =

Savyolki District Савёлки (Russian)
- District
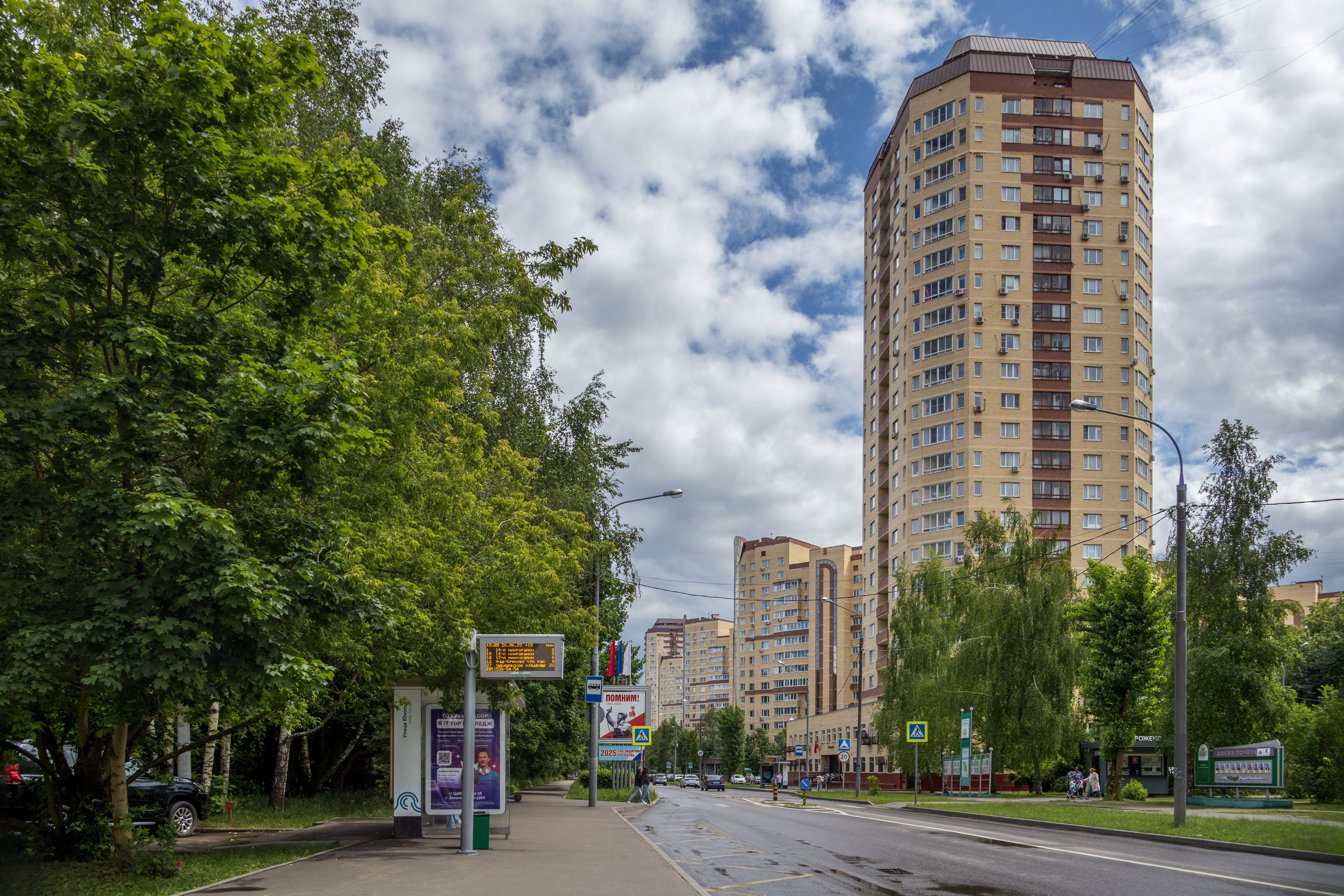
- Street scene in Zelenograd, Savyolki District

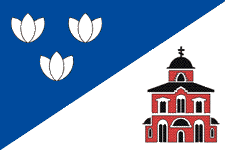
- Flag Coat of arms
- Location of Savyolki District on the map of Moscow
- Coordinates: 55°59′23″N 37°13′55″E
- Country: Russia
- Federal subject: Moscow

Government
  - Type: Local government
  - Leader: Igor Kostin
- Time zone: UTC+
- OKTMO ID: 45377000
- Website: http://www.savelki.ru/

Savyolki (Russian: Савёлки) is a district of Moscow within Zelenogradsky Administrative Okrug.

== See also ==
- Administrative divisions of Moscow
