= Matushkino District =

Matushkino District Ма́тушкино (Russian)
- District
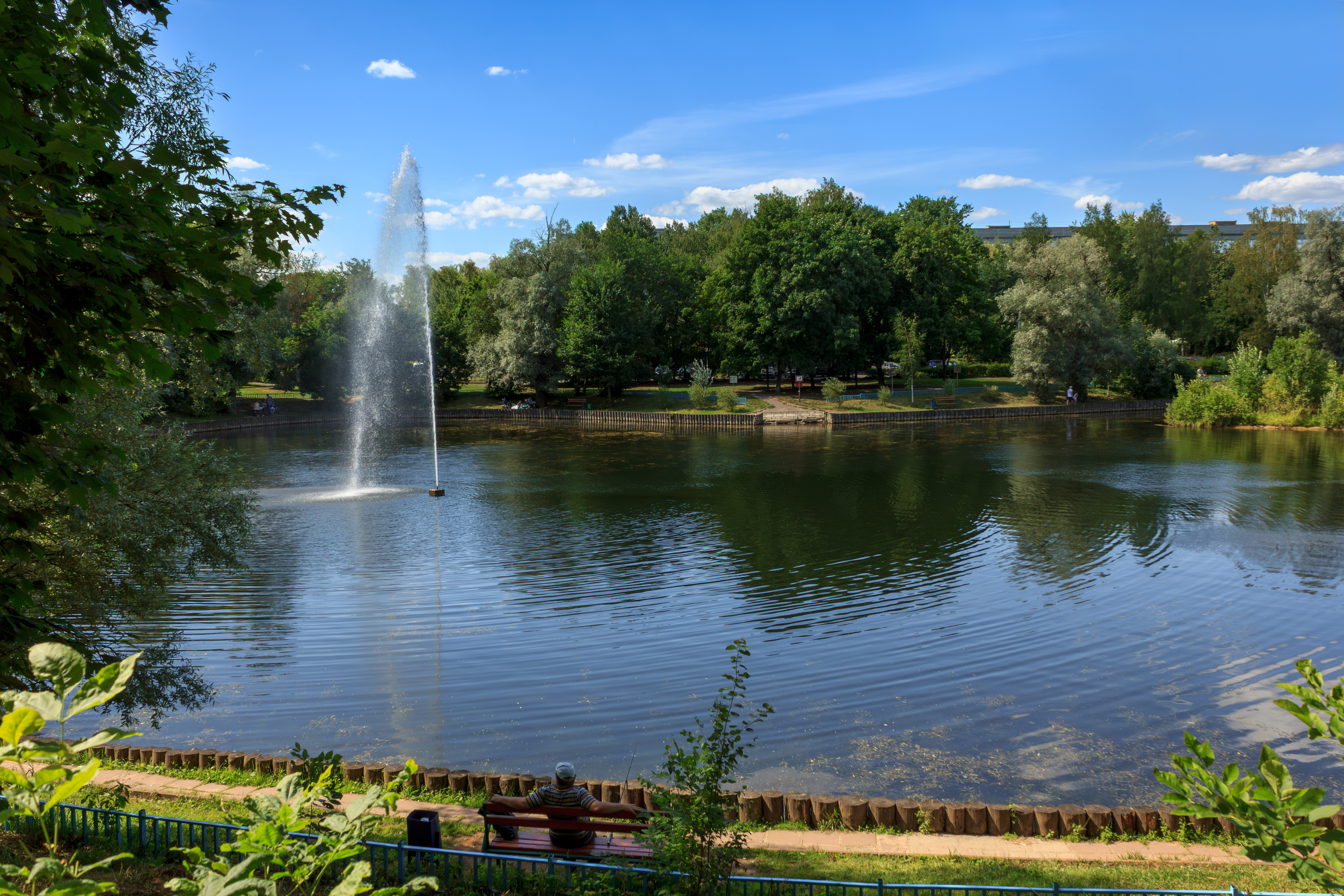
- Bykovo Pond in Zelenograd, Matushkino District

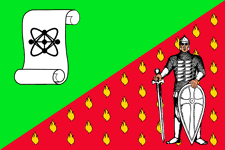
- Flag Coat of arms
- Location of Matushkino District on the map of Moscow
- Coordinates: 56°00′32″N 37°12′19″E
- Country: Russia
- Federal subject: Moscow
- Time zone: UTC+
- OKTMO ID: 45331000
- Website: http://matushkino.mos.ru/

Matushkino (Russian: Ма́тушкино) is a district of Moscow within Zelenogradsky Administrative Okrug.

== See also ==
- Administrative divisions of Moscow
