= Silino District =

Silino District Си́лино (Russian)
- District
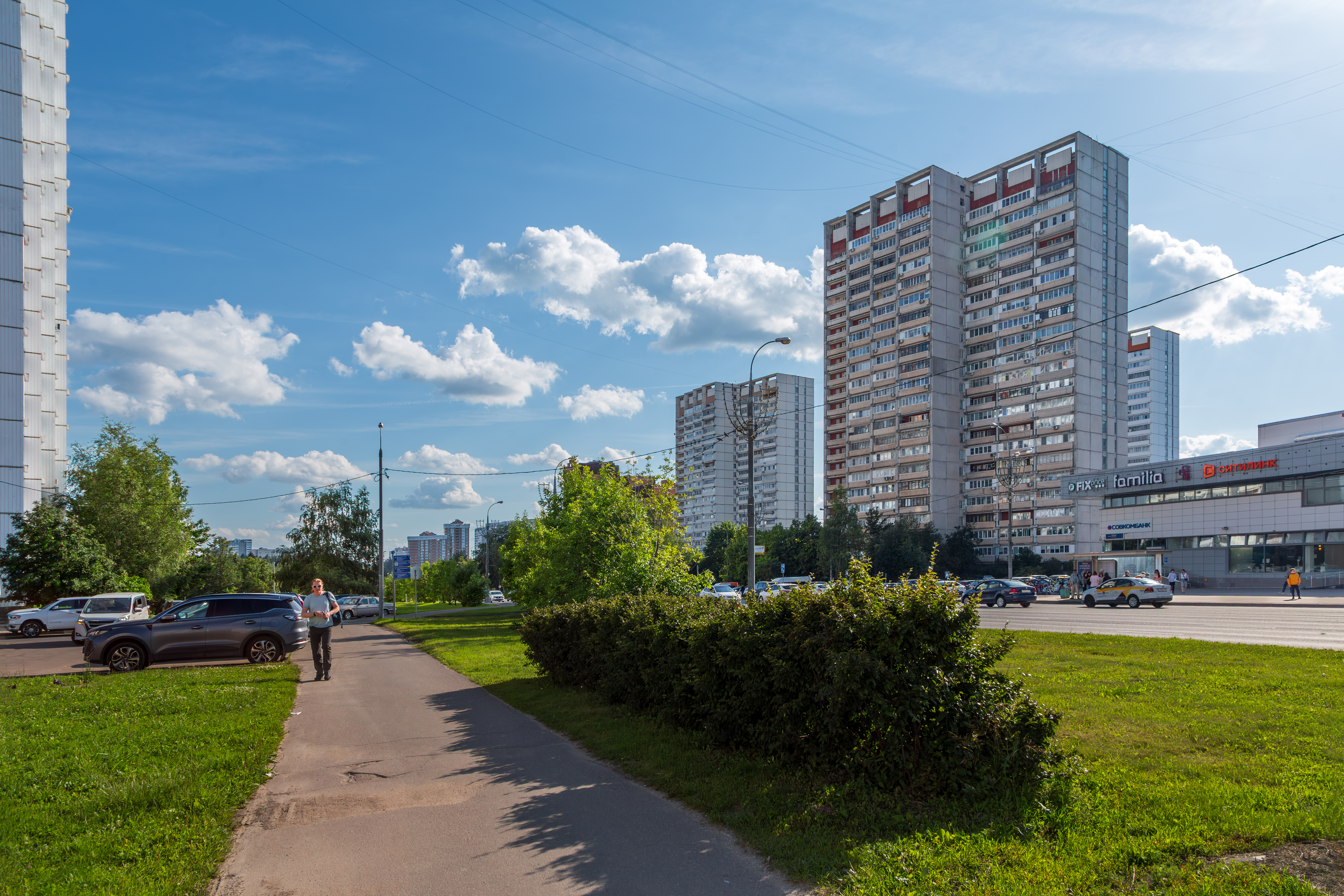
- Zelenograd - Panfilovskiy Avenue, Silino District

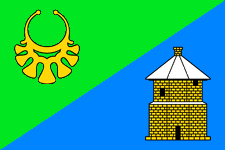
- Flag Coat of arms
- Location of Silino District on the map of Moscow
- Coordinates: 55°59′56″N 37°10′10″E
- Country: Russia
- Federal subject: Moscow
- Time zone: UTC+
- OKTMO ID: 45332000
- Website: http://www.silino.ru/

Silino (Russian: Си́лино) is a district of Moscow within Zelenogradsky Administrative Okrug.

== See also ==
- Administrative divisions of Moscow
