= Kokoshkino =

Kokoshkino Кокошкино
- Urban-type settlement
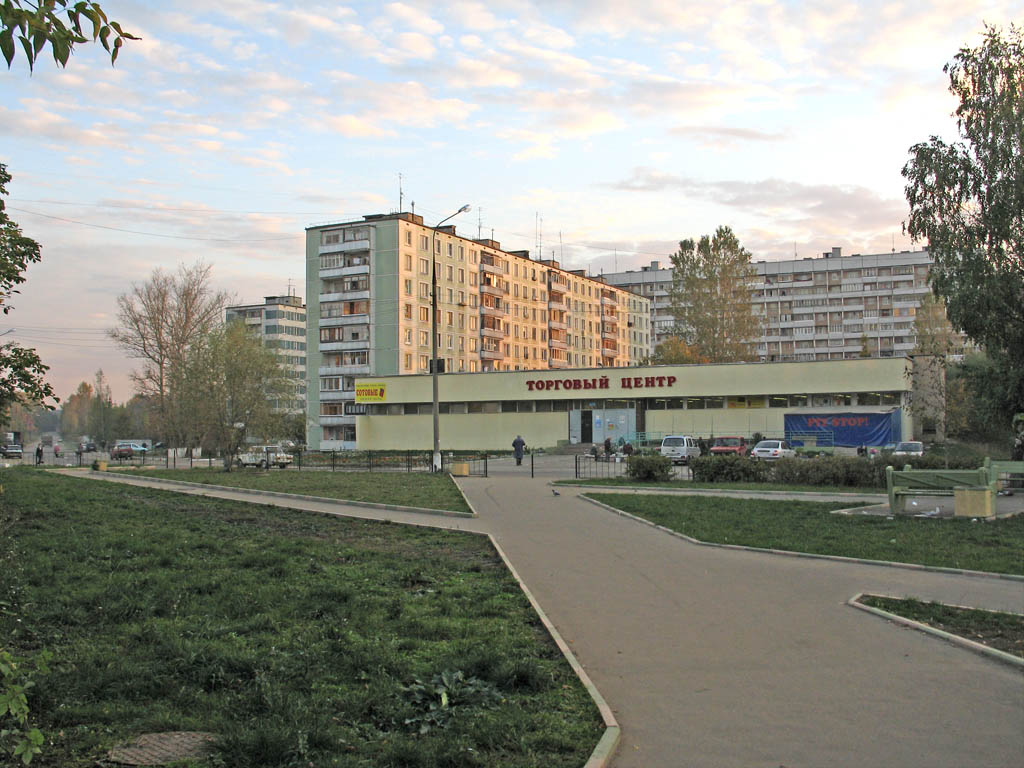

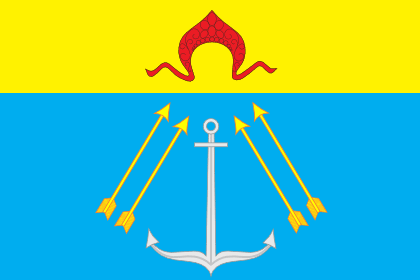
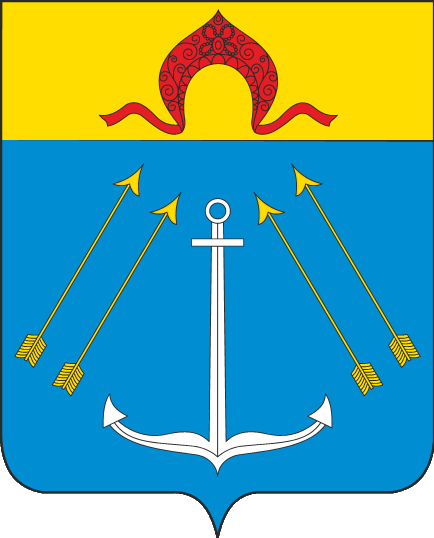
- Flag Coat of arms
- Interactive map of Kokoshkino
- Location of Kokoshkino Kokoshkino (Moscow)
- Coordinates: 55°36′N 37°10′E
- Country: Russia
- Federal subject: Moscow
- Administrative district: Novomoskovsky Administrative Okrug
- Founded: 1952

Population (2010 Census)
  - Total: 11,600
  - Estimate (2020): 18,932 (+63.2%)
- Postal code: 143390

Kokoshkino is an urban locality (an urban-type settlement) in Novomoskovsky Administrative Okrug of the federal city of Moscow, Russia.

Population: 11,600 (2010 census); 9,900 (2002 census); 10,694 (1989 Soviet census).

Kokoshkino is named after Fyodor Kokoshkin, founder of the Constitutional Democratic Party, who owned a house nearby. The flag of the Kokoshkino settlement is based on the coat of arms of the Kokoshkin family.
