= Staroye Kryukovo District =

Staroye Kryukovo District Ста́рое Крю́ково (Russian)
- District
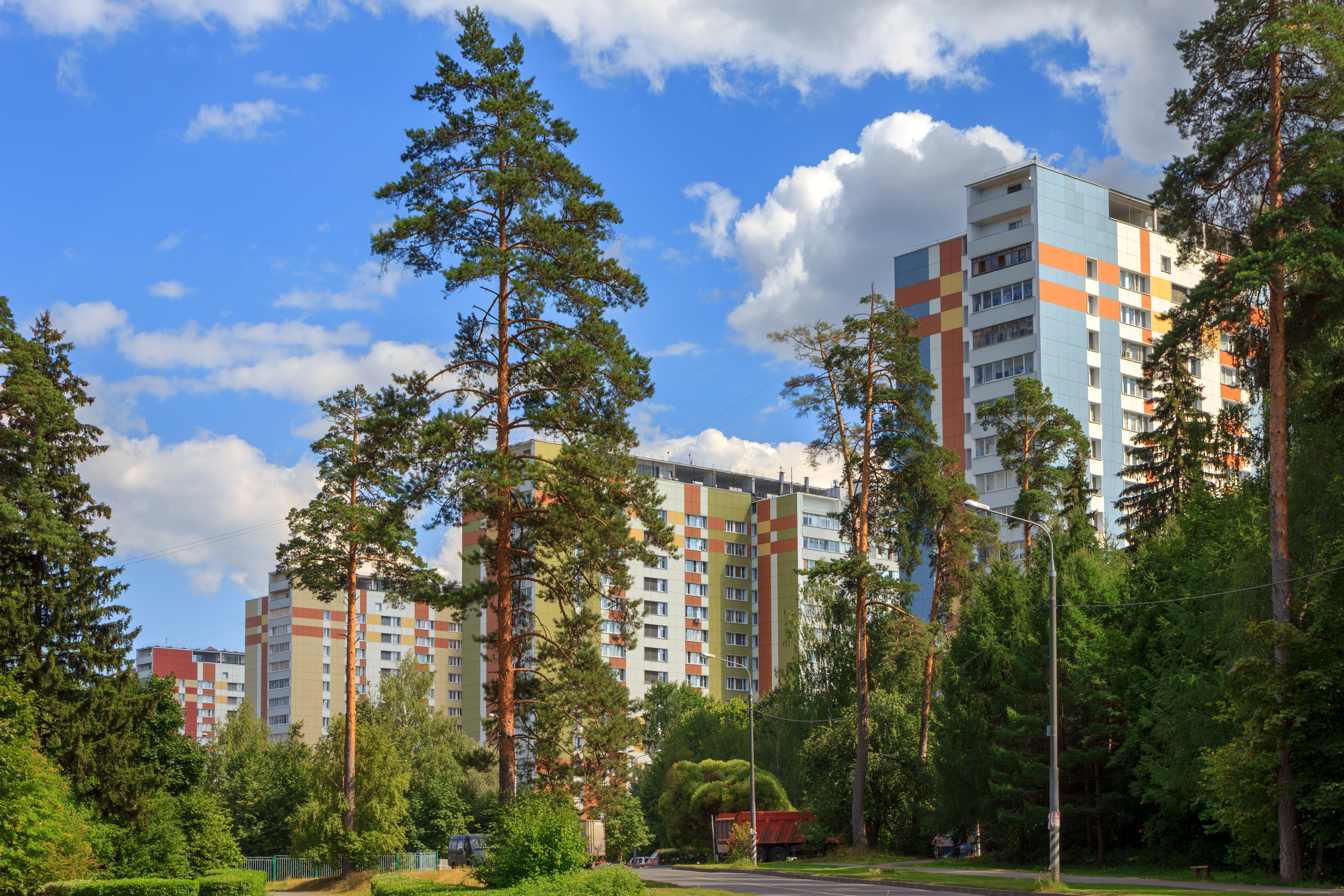
- Zelenograd 9th Microdistrict, Staroye Kryukovo District

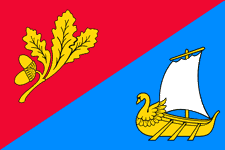
- Flag Coat of arms
- Location of Staroye Kryukovo District on the map of Moscow
- Coordinates: 55°59′N 37°12′E
- Country: Russia
- Federal subject: Moscow

Government
  - Type: Local government
  - Leader: Vasily Harpak
- Time zone: UTC+
- OKTMO ID: 45927000
- Website: https://staroe-krukovo.ru/

Staroye Kryukovo (Russian: Ста́рое Крю́ково) is a district of Moscow within Zelenogradsky Administrative Okrug.

== See also ==
- Administrative divisions of Moscow
