= Eastern Administrative Okrug =

Eastern Administrative Okrug Восточный административный округ
- Administrative okrug of Moscow
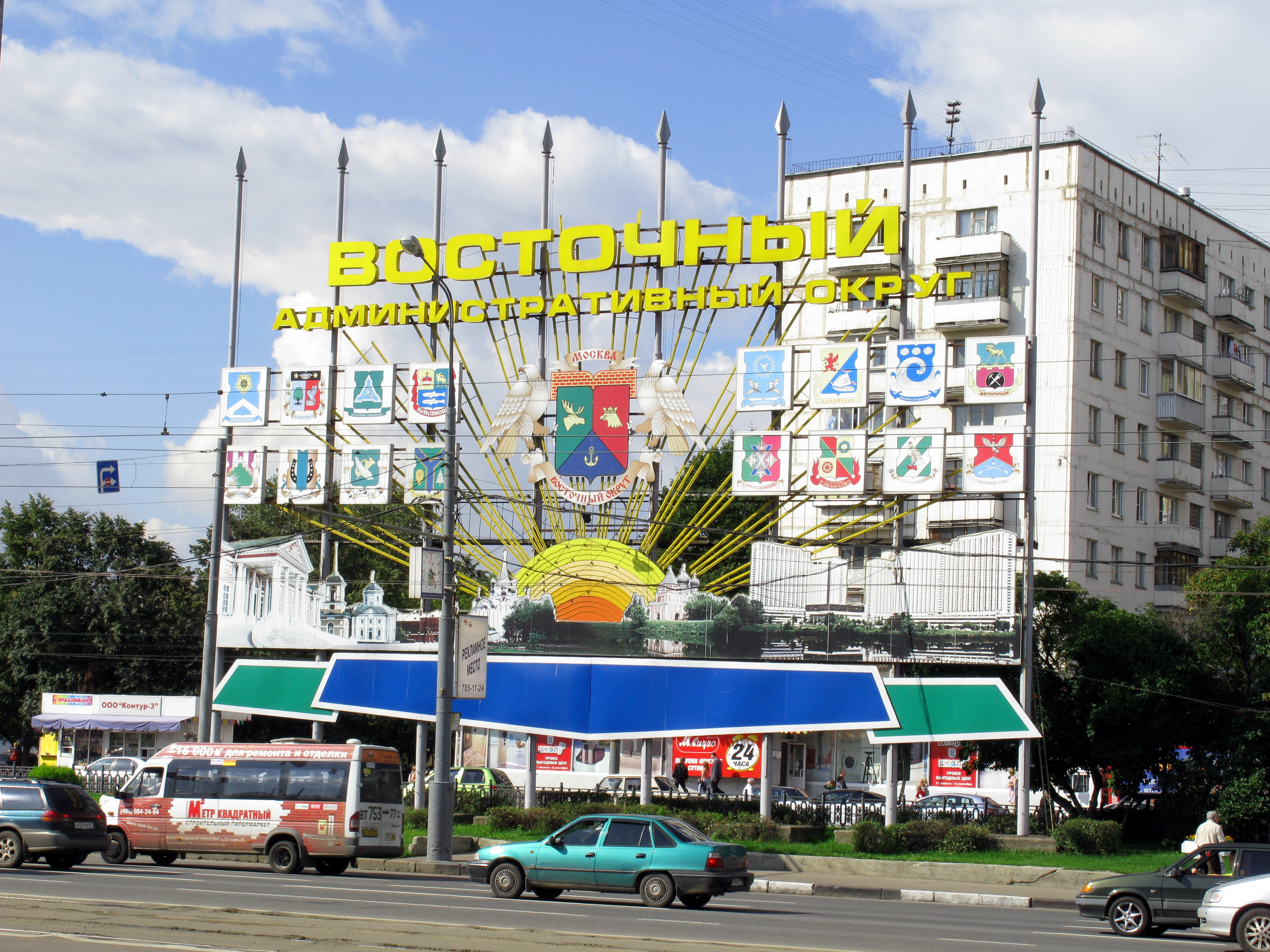
- Eastern Administrative Okrug sign on Preobrazhenskaya Square

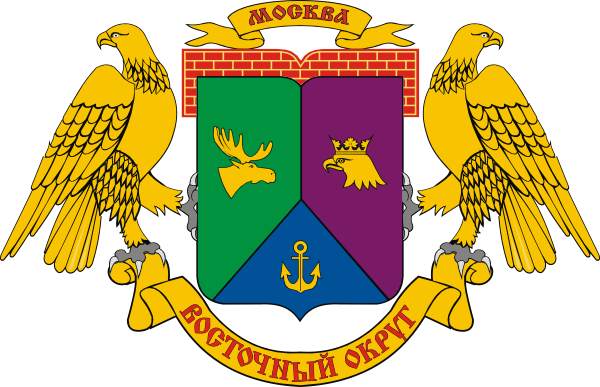
- Flag Coat of arms
- Eastern Administrative Okrug in Moscow
- Coordinates: 55°47′N 37°46′E
- Country: Russia
- Federal city: Moscow
- Established: 1991
- Districts: 16

Government
  - Prefect: Vsevolod Timofeyev

Area
  - Total: 154.6 km^{2} (59.7 sq mi)

Population (2010 Census)
  - Total: 1,452,759
- Website: http://vao.mos.ru

Eastern Administrative Okrug (Russian: Восто́чный администрати́вный о́круг, romanized: Vostochny administrativny okrug), or Vostochny Administrative Okrug, is one of the twelve high-level territorial divisions (administrative okrugs) of the federal city of Moscow, Russia. As of the 2010 Census, its population was 1,452,759, up from 1,394,497 recorded during the 2002 Census.

== Territorial divisions ==
The administrative okrug comprises the following sixteen districts:

- Bogorodskoye
- Veshnyaki
- Vostochnoye Izmaylovo
- Vostochny
- Golyanovo
- Ivanovskoye
- Izmaylovo
- Kosino-Ukhtomsky
- Metrogorodok
- Novogireyevo
- Novokosino
- Perovo
- Preobrazhenskoye
- Severnoye Izmaylovo
- Sokolinaya gora
- Sokolniki
