= Golyanovo District =

- District
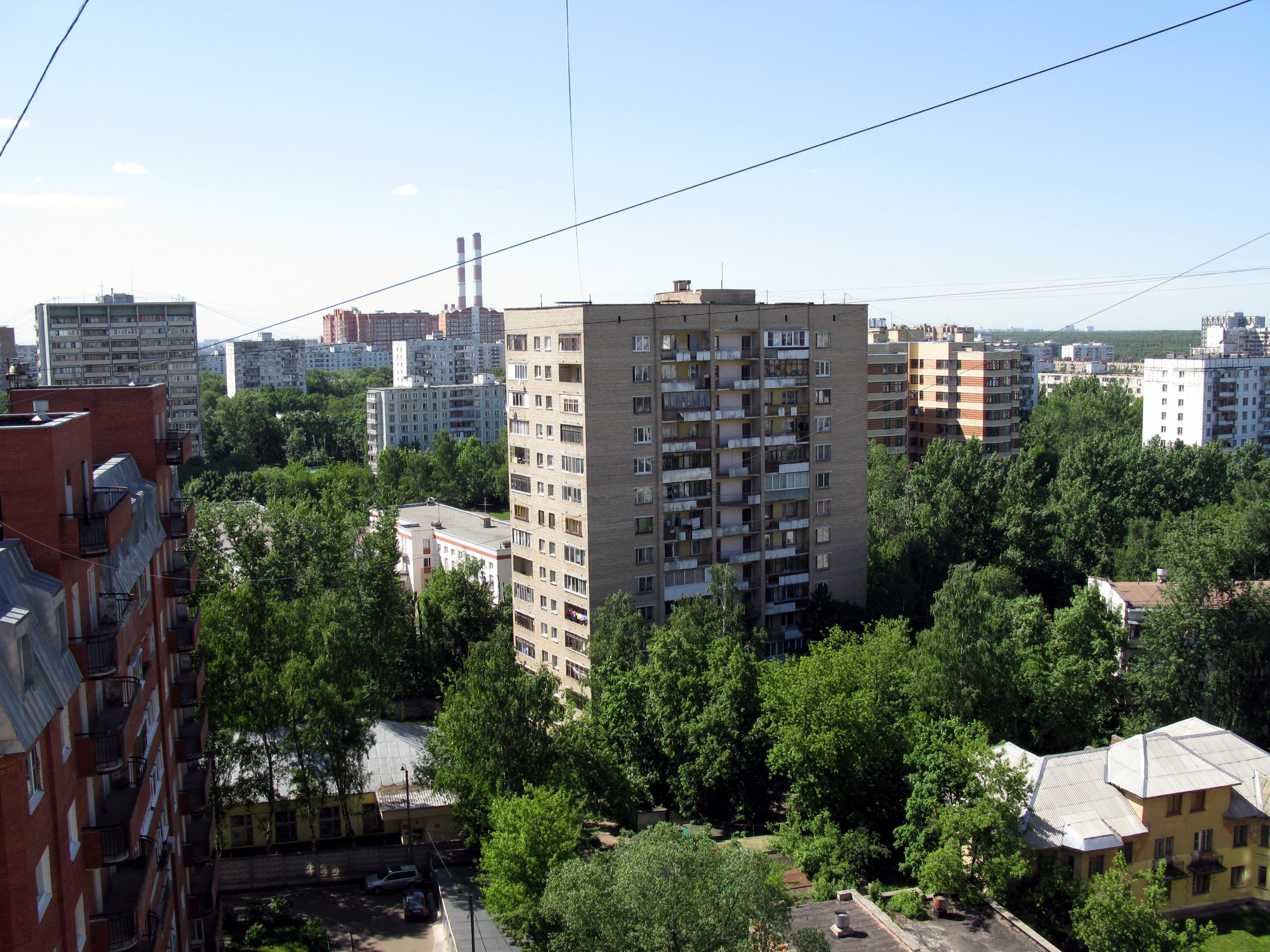
- Neighborhood in Golyanovo District

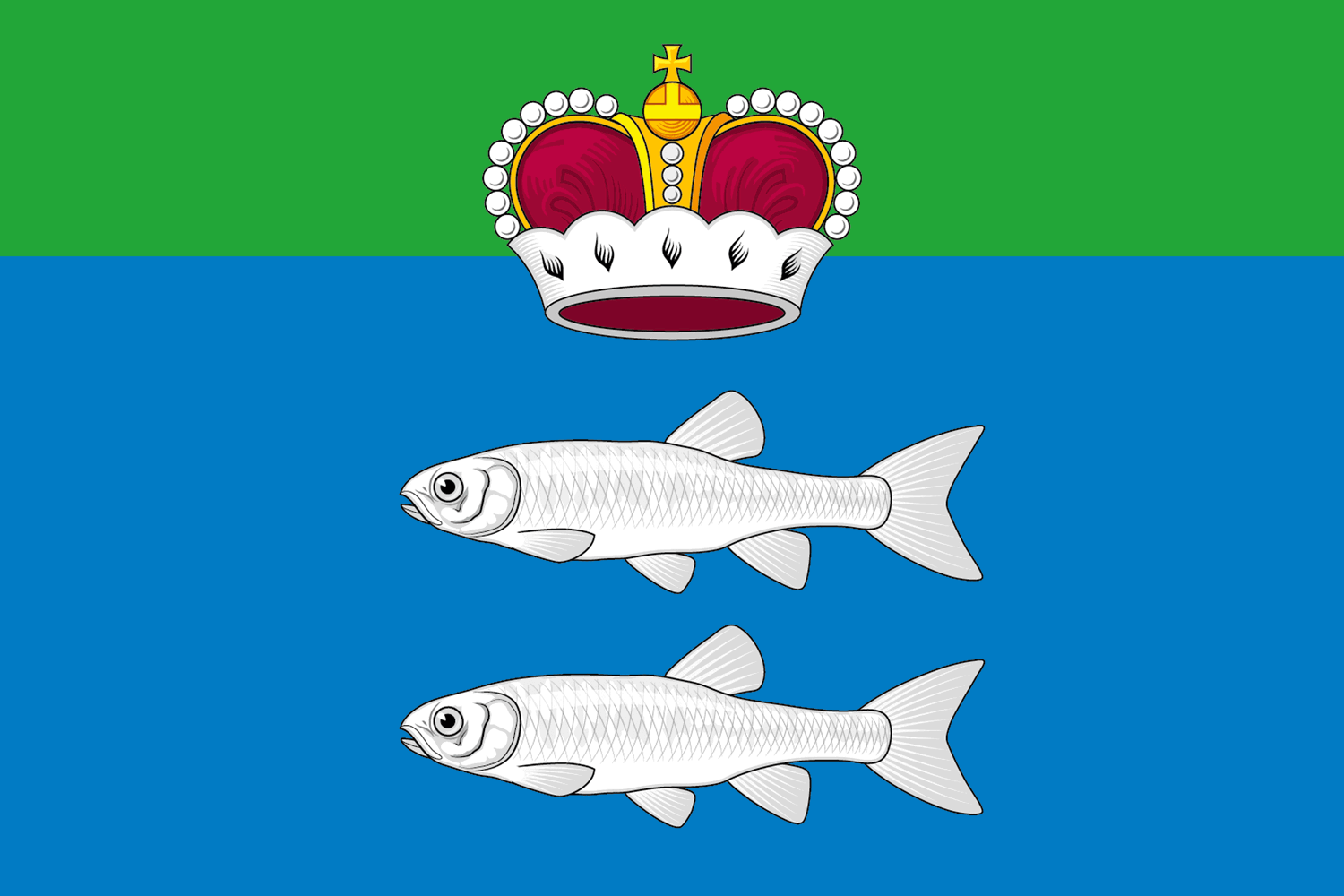
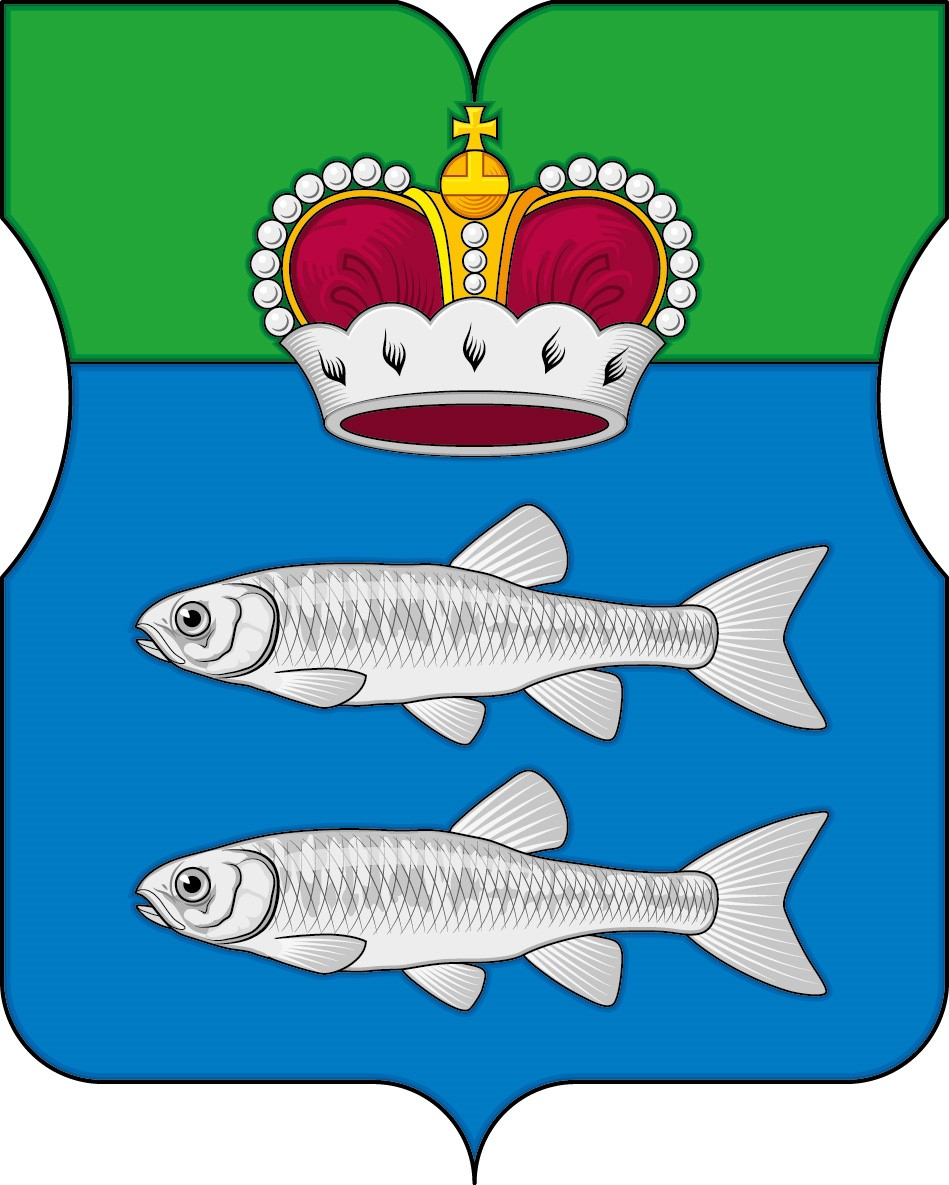
- Flag Coat of arms
- Location of Golyanovo District on the map of Moscow
- Coordinates: 55°49′14″N 37°48′26″E
- Country: Russia
- Federal subject: Moscow

Area
  - Total: 15 km^{2} (5.8 sq mi)
- Time zone: UTC+
- OKTMO ID: 45305000
- Website: http://golyanovo.mos.ru/

Golyanovo District (Russian: райо́н Голья́ново) is a district of Eastern Administrative Okrug of the federal city of Moscow, Russia. Population: 157,040 (2010 census); 159,147 (2002 census).

It is one of the largest districts in Moscow, both in terms of the geographic area and population size. Located 9-15 km to the east of the Kremlin, this large territory is bounded by MKAD (Moscow Automobile Ring Road), Shchyolkovskoye Shosse, and the national park "Losiny Ostrov".

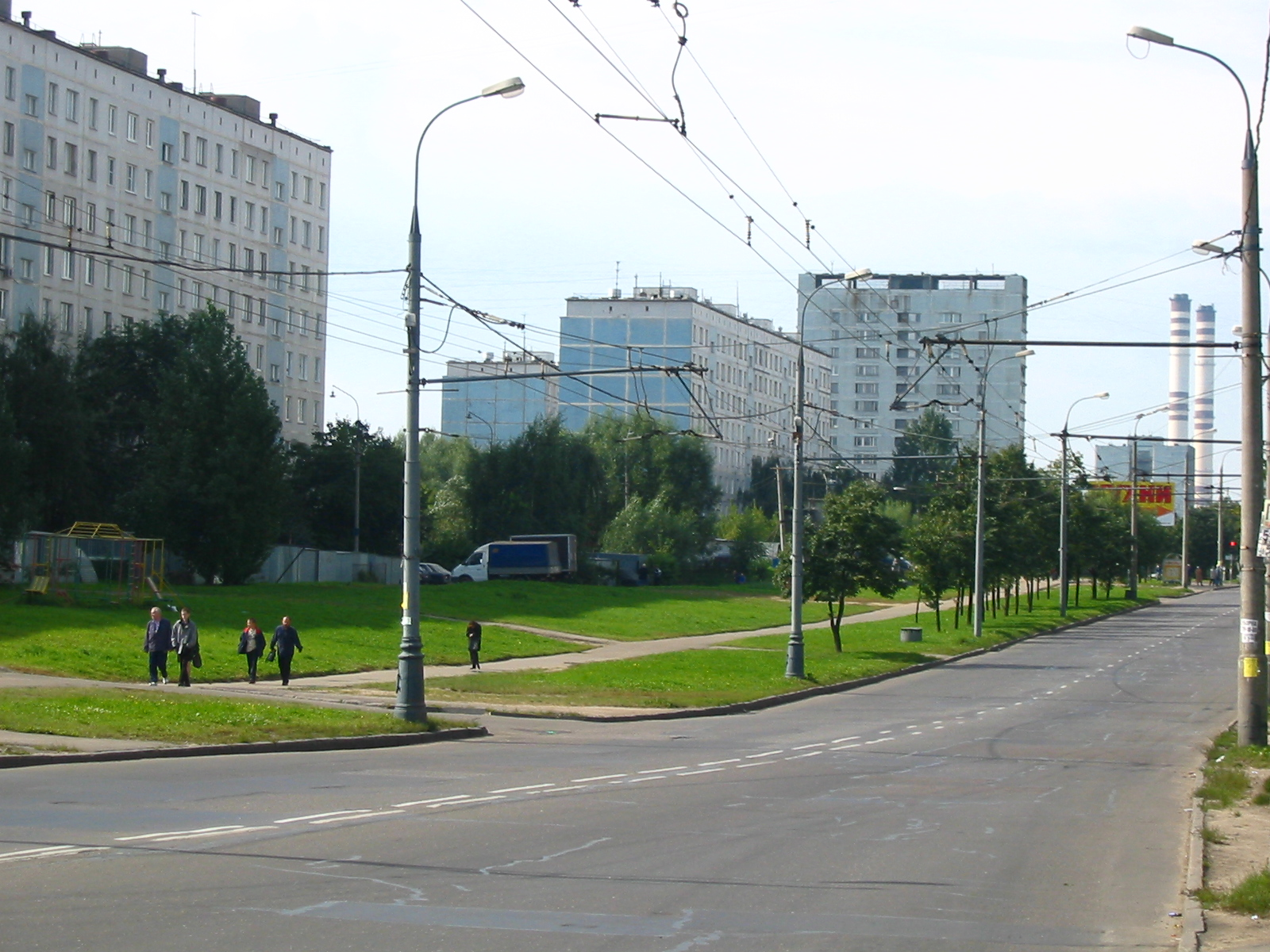
Golyanovo in 2004

Golyanovo is named after Russian: гольян, romanized: golyan, lit. 'minnow', which was once abundant in the local lakes. The first mention of Golyanovo dates back to the 17th century. Golyanovo was incorporated into the city of Moscow in the early 1960s. At approximately the same time, city officials started massive construction projects in the district, building numerous microdistricts.

== History ==
=== Early history (17th–18th centuries) ===
The first mentions of Golyanovo date back to the 1660s. Initially, it was a hamlet (prisyolok) of the royal palace village of Pokrovskoye-Rubtsovo, located on the ancient Khomutovka road. The name likely derives from the small minnow fish (golyan), which was found in local rivers, or from the nickname of the first settler. In 1662, a wooden church dedicated to the Solovetsky wonderworkers Zosima and Savvaty was built here. For a long time, the peasants were under the jurisdiction of the royal Prikaz of the Great Palace and engaged in agriculture.

=== 19th century: Trubetskoy estate and industrial development ===
In the early 19th century, Golyanovo passed into private hands. In 1811, Prince Ivan Nikolayevich Trubetskoy became its owner. During the French invasion of Russia in 1812, the main Trubetskoy estate near Moscow was burned by the French, so the princely residence was moved to Golyanovo. This gave an impetus to the development of the village: in 1842, a stone church in the late classicism style, which has survived to this day, was erected. In the second half of the 19th century, the local economy began to shift towards manufacturing, with small brick, weaving, and dyeing factories opening in the village and the neighboring settlements of Chernitsyno and Kaloshino.

=== 20th century: Industrialization ===
At the beginning of the 20th century, the economic profile of the area changed significantly: new manufacturing industries began to develop, and large agricultural enterprises were established. Subsequently, the district acquired pronounced industrial characteristics. The Moscow Abrasive Plant, the "Mospromelektrokonstruktsiya" plant, Installation Plant No. 1, and an opto-mechanical plant were commissioned here, and a number of research institutes were also opened.

=== Part of Moscow (since 1960) ===
In August 1960, following the construction of the Moscow Automobile Ring Road (MKAD), Golyanovo and the neighboring villages of Chernitsyno and Kaloshino were incorporated into the city limits of Moscow as part of the unified Golyanovo district. In the second half of the 1960s, mass residential construction began here, transforming the former settlements into a large residential area. In 1963, the Shchyolkovskaya metro station was opened, and in 1971, the Central Bus Terminal was built. The modern boundaries of the district were established in 1991. Today, it is one of the largest districts in the eastern part of the capital.

== Symbols ==
The modern official symbols of the Golyanovo municipal district are the coat of arms and the flag. Both of these symbols were adopted on April 23, 2015. The flag and the coat of arms have an identical composition that reflects the historical and natural features of the area.

The heraldic design of the coat of arms and flag consists of a blue (azure) field with a green top band (chief). The main elements include:

- Silver fishes: Two minnows (golyans) swimming one above the other, referring to the most likely origin of the district's name.
- Princely hat: Placed over the border of the green and blue fields, it serves as a reminder that these lands were historically owned by the princes Trubetskoy.
- Colors: The green color represents the Losiny Ostrov National Park located within the district, while the blue symbolizes high aspirations and sincerity.

=== Coat of arms ===
The coat of arms features a blue (azure) field with a green top band (chief). Two silver minnows (golyans) are depicted swimming one above the other in the blue field. A princely hat is placed over the border between the green and blue sections. The coat of arms is entered into the State Heraldic Register of the Russian Federation under No. 10340.

=== Flag ===
The flag is a rectangular panel with a width-to-length ratio of 2:3. The main field is blue, with a green horizontal stripe along the top edge covering three-tenths of the flag's width. In the center of the flag are two white minnows swimming one above the other, topped by a princely hat placed over the border of the two colored bands. The flag is entered into the State Heraldic Register of the Russian Federation under No. 10341.
