= Vostochny District, Moscow =

- District
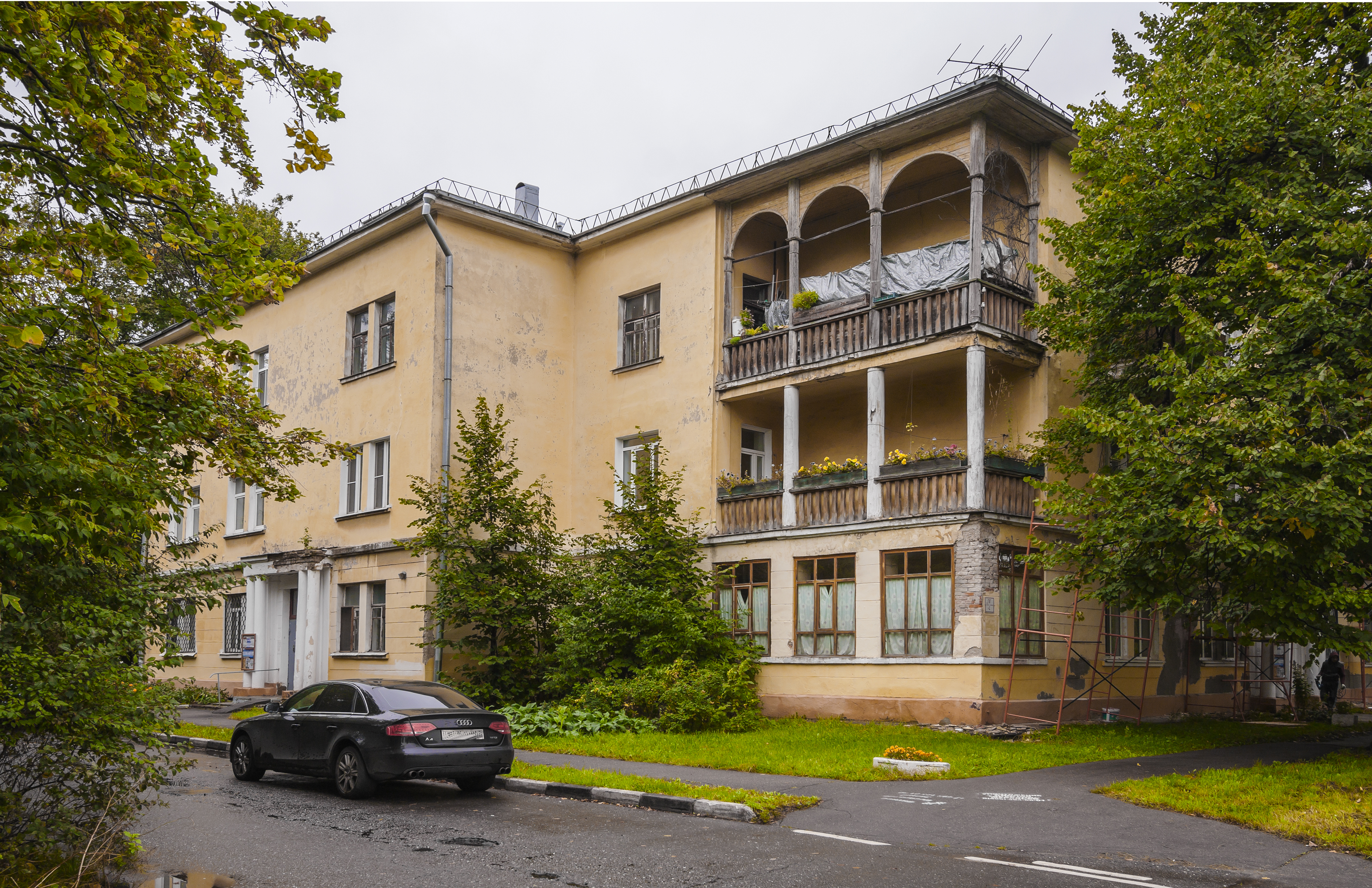
- Residential village, Vostochny District

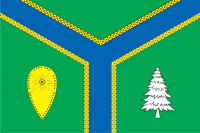
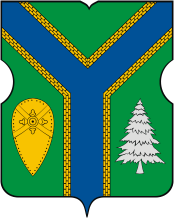
- Flag Coat of arms
- Location of Vostochny District, Moscow on the map of Moscow
- Coordinates: 55°49′08″N 37°51′59″E
- Country: Russia
- Federal subject: Moscow
- Time zone: UTC+
- OKTMO ID: 45304000
- Website: http://vostochniy.mos.ru/

Vostochny District, Moscow (Russian: райо́н Восто́чный) is an administrative district (raion) of Eastern Administrative Okrug, and one of the 125 raions of Moscow, Russia.

== See also ==
- Administrative divisions of Moscow
