= Metrogorodok District =

Metrogorodok
- District
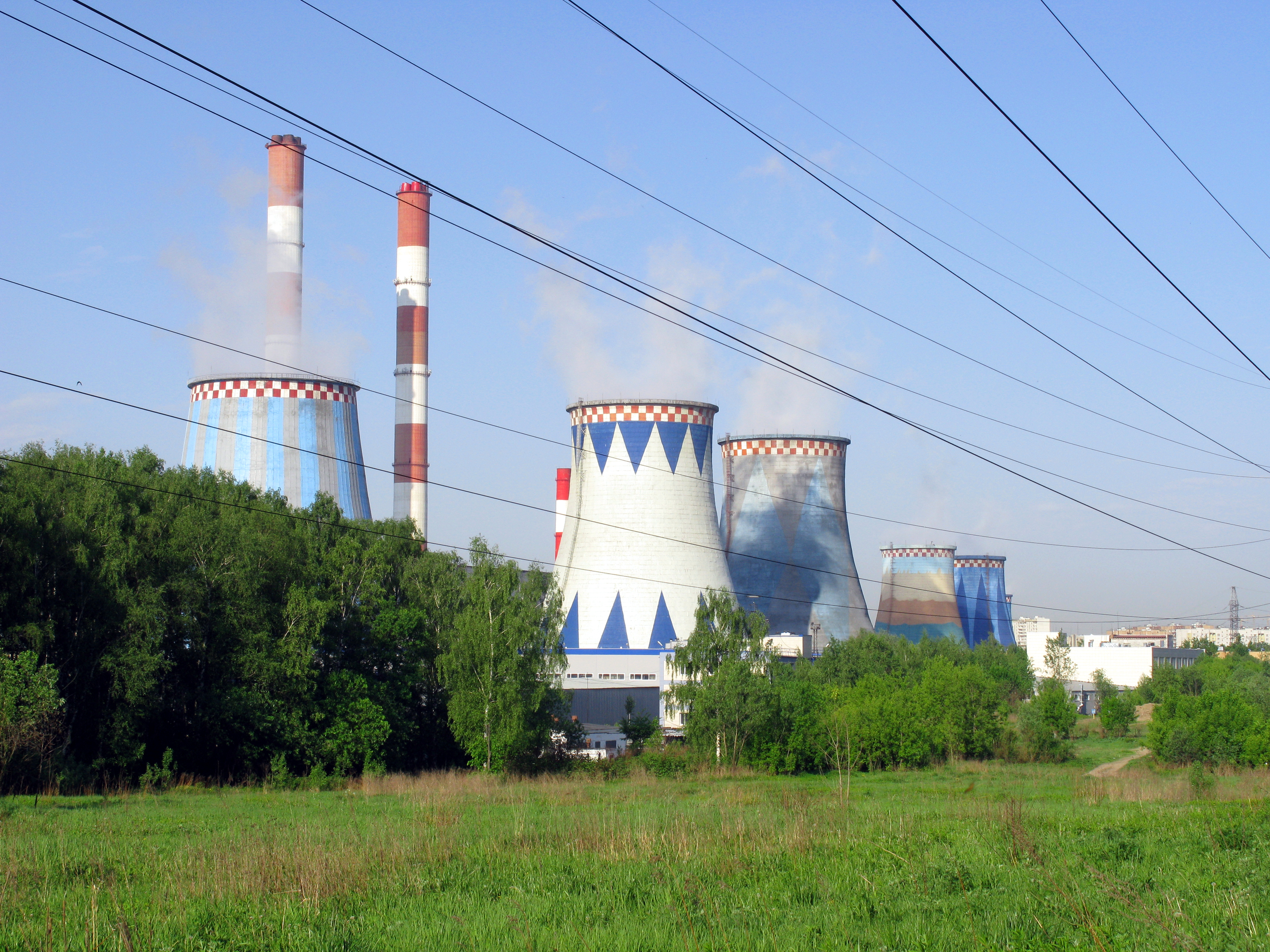
- CHP-23 power station, Metrogorodok District

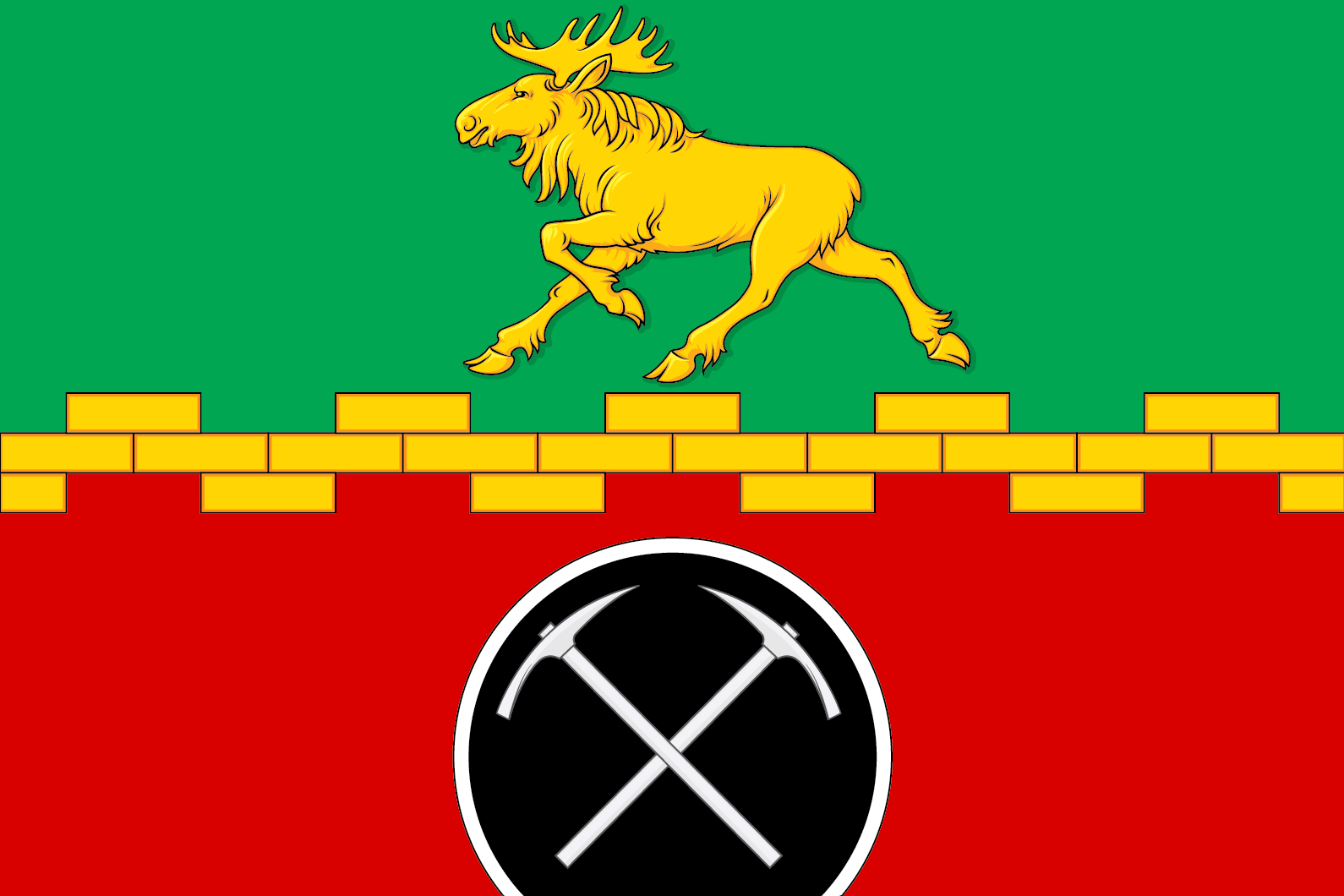
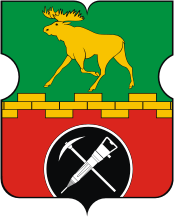
- Flag Coat of arms
- Location of Metrogorodok District on the map of Moscow
- Coordinates: 55°50′19″N 37°44′54″E
- Country: Russia
- Federal subject: Moscow

Area
  - Total: 27.57 km^{2} (10.64 sq mi)
- Time zone: UTC+
- OKTMO ID: 45311000
- Website: Official website

Metrogorodok District (Russian: район Метрогородок) is the northernmost administrative district (55° 50' 19.26" 37° 44' 55.32"E) (raion) of Eastern Administrative Okrug, and one of the 125 raions of Moscow, Russia.

The district has a size of 27.57 square kilometers (10.64 sq mi). 90% of the Metrogorodok's area is occupied by the Losiny Ostrov National Park. Despite that fact, the ecological situation is assessed as unfavorable because of the Kaloshino industrial zone, combined heat and power station No. 23 and felling of forest zones.

The municipality got its name from the metro builders settlement, which arose in the 1930s during the construction of the first stage of the Moscow metro.

== See also ==
- Administrative divisions of Moscow
