= Vostochnoye Izmaylovo District =

Vostochnoye Izmaylovo District район Восточное Измайлово (Russian)
- District
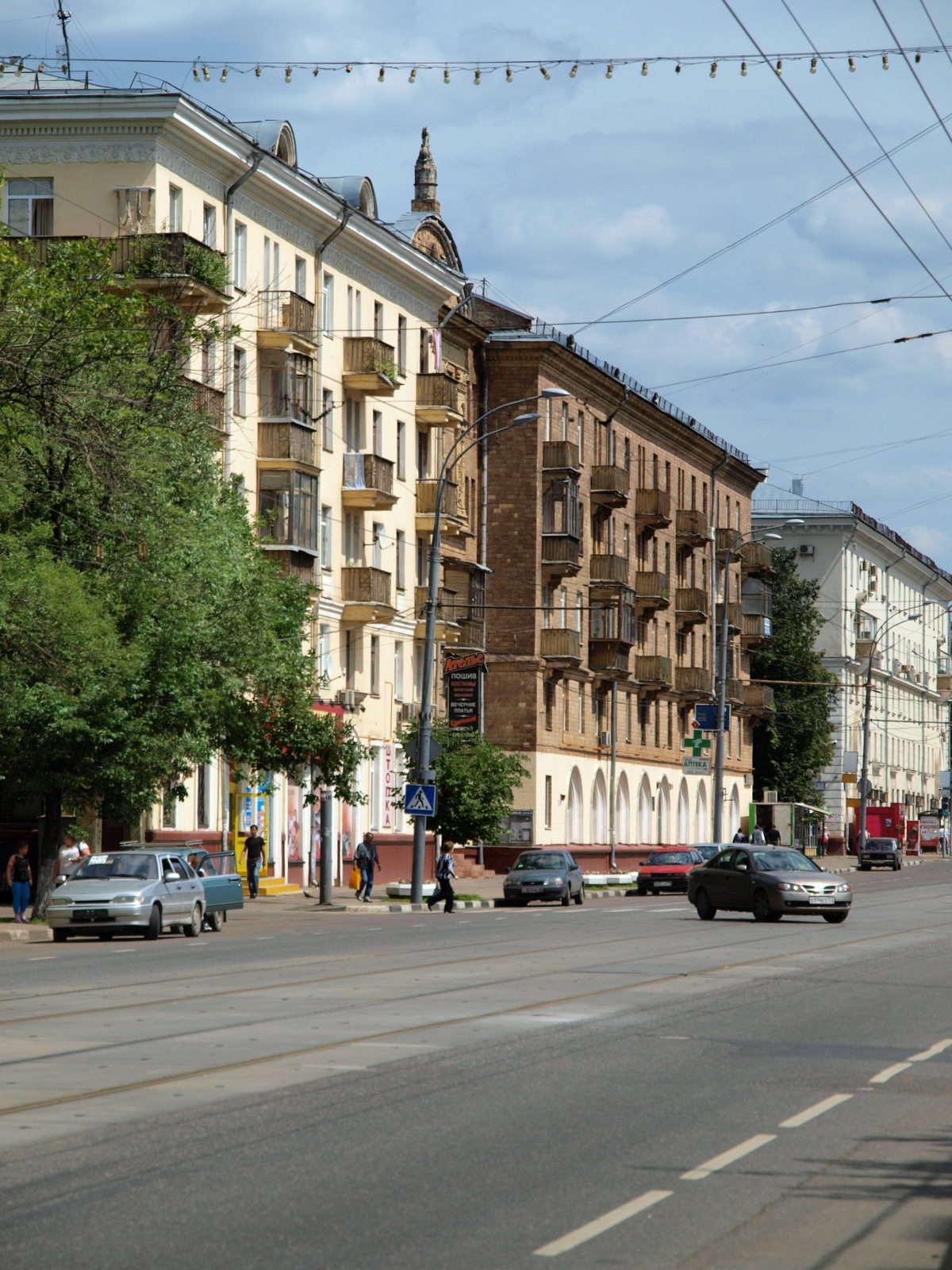
- Pervomayskaya Street in Vostochnoye Izmaylovo District

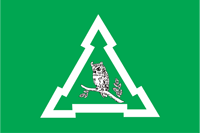
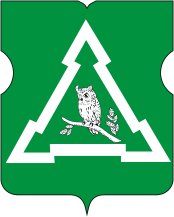
- Flag Coat of arms
- Location of Vostochnoye Izmaylovo District in Moscow (pre-2012 map)
- Coordinates: 55°47′47″N 37°49′04″E
- Country: Russia
- Federal subject: federal city of Moscow

Area
  - Total: 3.84 km^{2} (1.48 sq mi)

Population (2010 Census)
  - Total: 76,312
  - Density: 19,900/km^{2} (51,500/sq mi)

Municipal structure
  - Municipally incorporated as: Vostochnoye Izmaylovo Municipal Okrug
- Time zone: UTC+
- OKTMO ID: 45303000
- Website: http://v-izm.mos.ru

Vostochnoye Izmaylovo District (Russian: райо́н Восто́чное Изма́йлово) is an administrative district (raion), one of the sixteen in Eastern Administrative Okrug of the federal city of Moscow, Russia. The area is 3.84 square kilometres (1.48 mi^{2}). As of the 2010 Census, its population was 76,312, up from 75,450 recorded during the 2002 Census.

== Municipal status ==
As a municipal division, it is incorporated as Vostochnoye Izmaylovo Municipal Okrug.
