= Severnoye Izmaylovo District =

- District
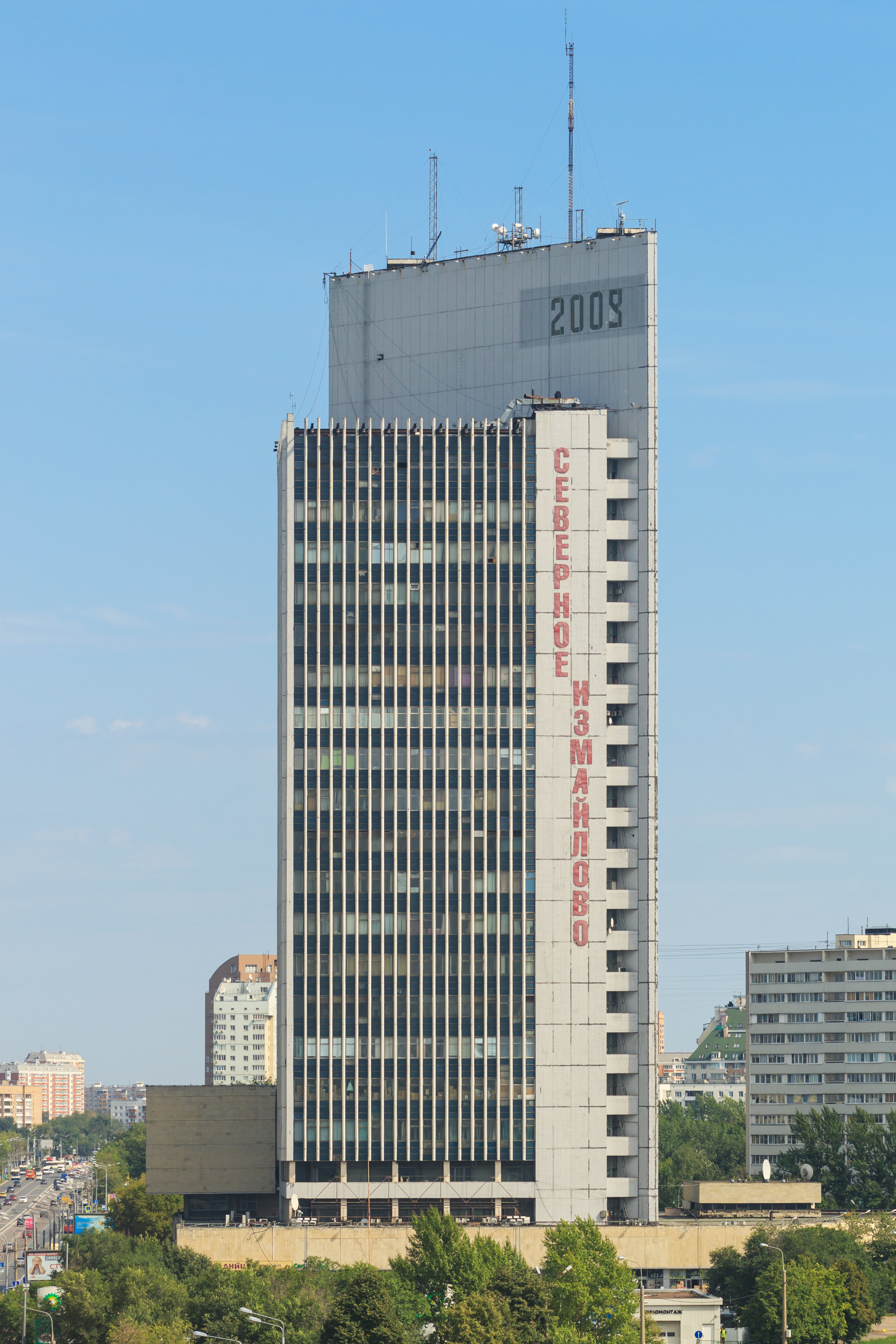
- View of Severnoye Izmaylovo District

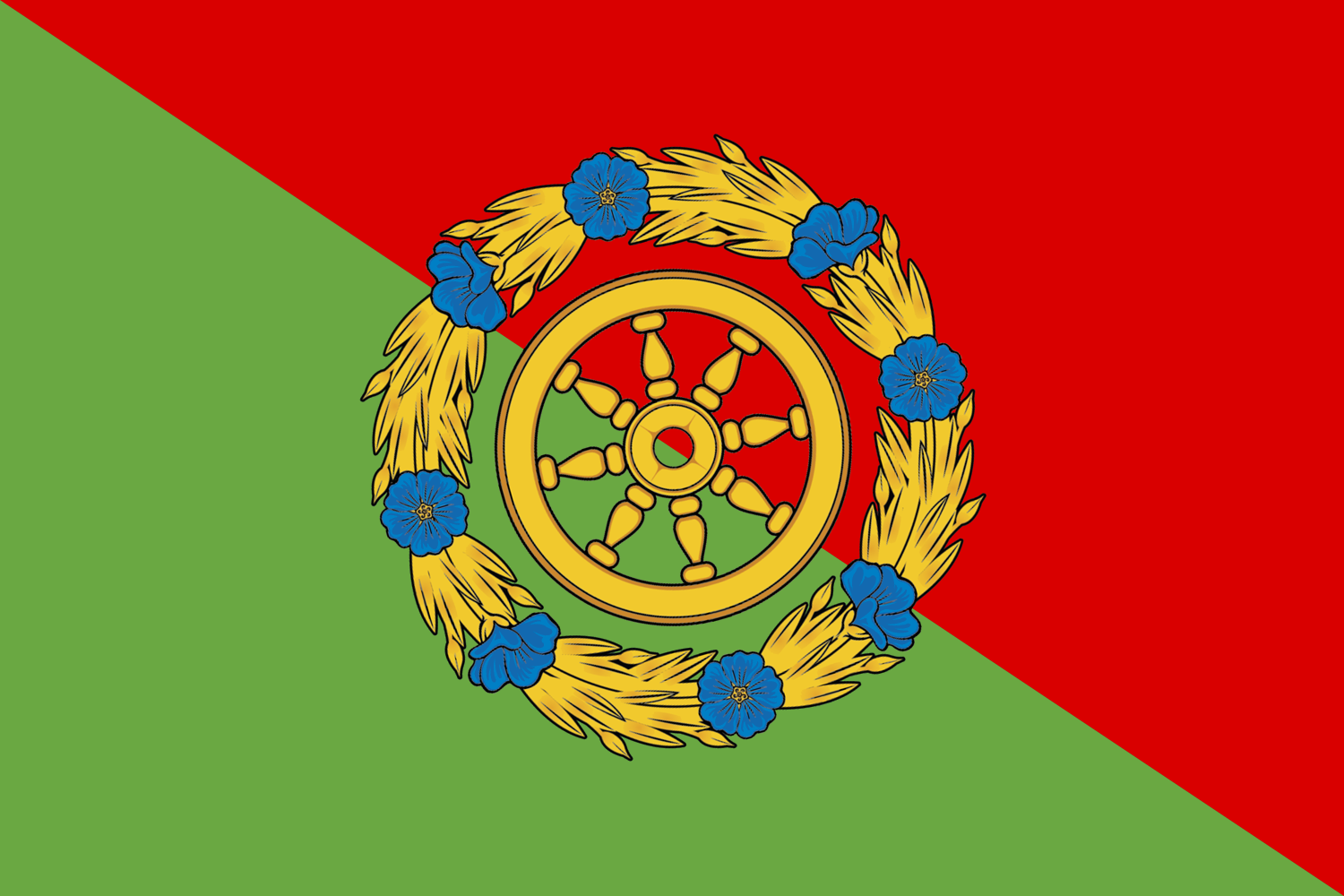
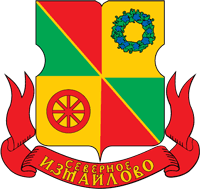
- Flag Coat of arms
- Location of Severnoye Izmaylovo District on the map of Moscow
- Coordinates: 55°48′32″N 37°49′17″E
- Country: Russia
- Federal subject: Moscow
- Established: 1991

Area
  - Total: 4 km^{2} (1.5 sq mi)

Population
  - Estimate (2017): 85,741
- Time zone: UTC+
- OKTMO ID: 45313000
- Website: http://sevizm.mos.ru/

Severnoye Izmaylovo District (Russian: район Северное Измайлово) is one of 16 administrative districts (raions) of Eastern Administrative Okrug, and one of the 125 raions of Moscow, Russia. It is bounded on the north by Shchyolkovo Highway, on the south by Sirenevy Boulevard, and on the east by the Moscow Ring Road (MKAD). The area of the district is 4 square kilometers (1.5 sq mi). Population: 85741 (2017 est.);

== See also ==
- Administrative divisions of Moscow
