= Khovrino constituency =

Russian legislative constituency

Khovrino single-member constituency
- Constituency of the Russian State Duma
- Deputy: Aleksandr Asafov; United Russia
- Federal subject: Moscow
- Districts: Zelenogradsky AO, Northern AO (Golovinsky, Khovrino, Levoberezhny, Molzhaninovsky), North-Western AO (Kurkino, Severnoye Tushino)
- Voters: 485,630 (2026)

The Khovrino constituency (No.206 (Note: Sheremetyevo constituency No.203 in 1993-1995, Sheremetyevo constituency No.205 in 1995-2007, No.207 in 2016–2026)) is a Russian legislative constituency in Moscow. The constituency covers north-western part of Northern Moscow and northern North-Western Moscow as well as Zelenograd.

The constituency has been represented since 2026 by United Russia deputy Aleksandr Asafov, political consultant and media strategist, who won the open seat after three-term United Russia incumbent Irina Belykh successfully sought re-election on the party list.

== Boundaries ==
1993–2007 Sheremetyevo constituency: Northern Administrative Okrug (Beskudnikovsky District, Businovo District, (Note: merged with Zapadnoye Degunino District in 1997) Dmitrovsky District, Khovrino District, Levoberezhny District, Molzhaninovsky District, Vostochnoye Degunino District, Zapadnoye Degunino District), Zelenograd
The constituency covered northern part of Northern Moscow and the exclave Zelenograd.

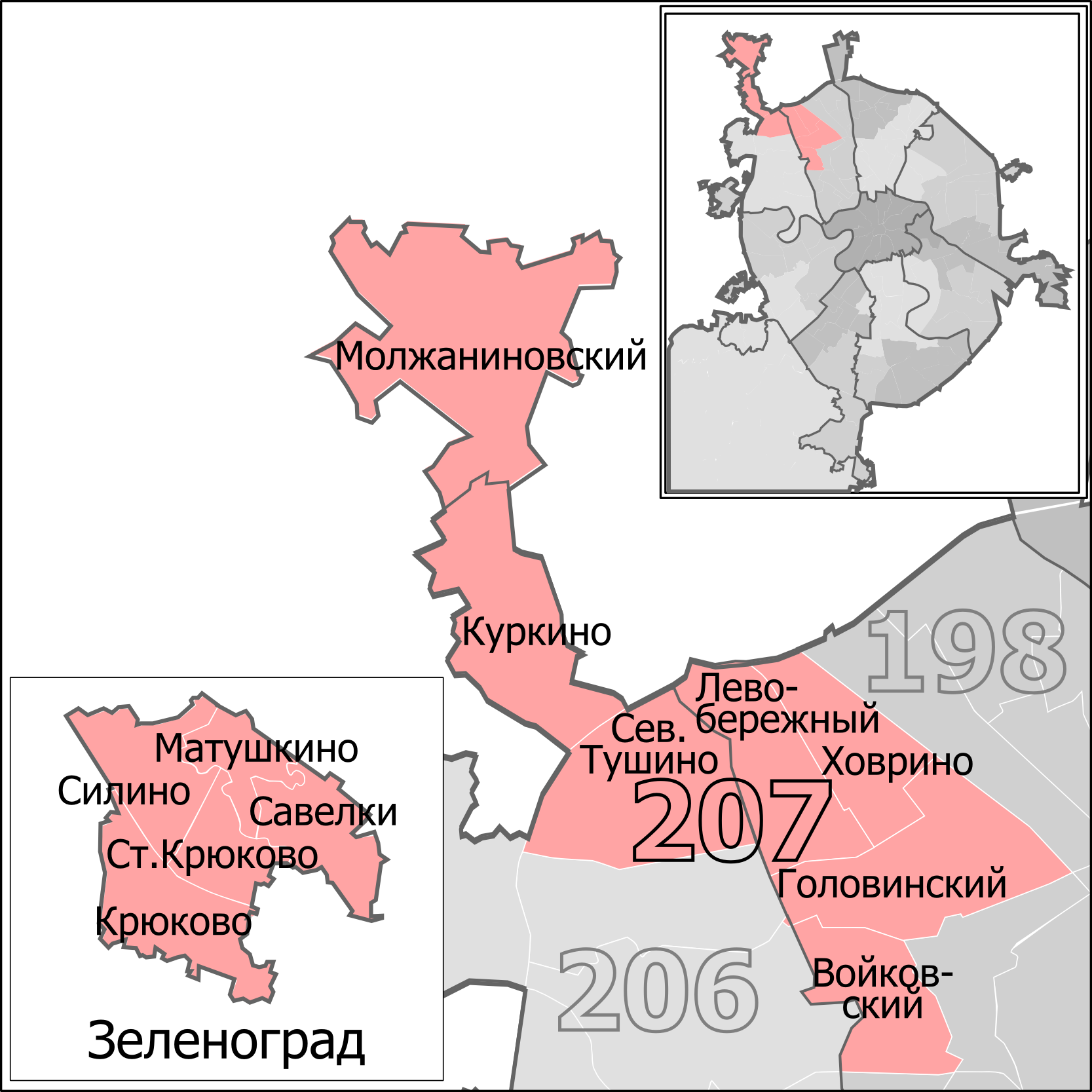
Constituency boundaries from 2016 to 2026

2016–2026: North-Western Administrative Okrug (Kurkino District, Severnoye Tushino District), Northern Administrative Okrug (Golovinsky District, Khovrino District, Levoberezhny District, Molzhaninovsky District, Voykovsky District), Zelenograd
The constituency was re-created for the 2016 election under the name "Khovrino constituency" and retained half of its former territory, losing Beskudnikovsky District, Dmitrovsky District, Vostochnoye Degunino and Zapadnoye Degunino to Leningradsky constituency. This seat instead gained Golovinsky District and Voykovsky District from Leningradsky constituency as well as North-Western Moscow districts Kurkino and Severnoye Tushino from Tushino constituency.

2026–present: North-Western Administrative Okrug (Kurkino District, Severnoye Tushino District), Northern Administrative Okrug (Golovinsky District, Khovrino District, Levoberezhny District, Molzhaninovsky District), Zelenograd
After the 2025 redistricting the constituency was slightly altered, losing Voykovsky District to Tushino constituency.

== Members elected ==
Election	Member	Party
1993	Andrey Makarov	Choice of Russia
1995	Andrey Makarov	Independent
1999	Nikolay Kovalyov	Fatherland – All Russia
2003	Sergey Osadchy	United Russia
2007	Proportional representation - no election by constituency	
2011	Proportional representation - no election by constituency	
2016	Irina Belykh	United Russia
2021	Irina Belykh	United Russia
2026	Aleksandr Asafov	United Russia

== Election results ==
=== 1993 ===
Summary of the 12 December 1993 Russian legislative election in the Sheremetyevo constituency
Candidate	Party	Votes	%
Andrey Makarov	Choice of Russia	59,986	27.66%
Tatyana Bulgakova	Liberal Democratic Party	–	8.51%
Artur Aleksanyan	Independent	–	–
Sergey Baranov	Independent	–	–
Yury Konkin	Agrarian Party	–	–
Vitaly Kryuchkov	Independent	–	–
Sergey Kulishov	Civic Union	–	–
Andrey Pavlov	Yavlinky–Boldyrev–Lukin	–	–
Roman Pugachev	Party of Russian Unity and Accord	–	–
Vladimir Saprykin	Communist Party	–	–
Vitaly Shomin	Kedr	–	–
Total		216,876	100%

=== 1995 ===
Summary of the 17 December 1995 Russian legislative election in the Sheremetyevo constituency
Candidate	Party	Votes	%
Andrey Makarov (incumbent)	Independent	53,803	18.13%
Arkady Murashyov	Democratic Choice of Russia – United Democrats	52,286	17.62%
Viktor Zhiltsov	Communist Party	36,597	12.33%
Aleksandr Chumakov	Yabloko	31,530	10.62%
Fyodor Zheleznov	Independent	20,307	6.84%
Sergey Nefyodov	Pamfilova–Gurov–Lysenko	11,537	3.89%
Vitaly Tarlavsky	Party of Workers' Self-Government	8,746	2.95%
Vladimir Bespalov	Serving Russia!	8,627	2.91%
Vyacheslav Makarov	Social Democrats	7,067	2.38%
Anatoly Malashkin	Independent	4,308	1.45%
Sergey Baranov	Independent	4,291	1.45%
Vyacheslav Grigoryev	Independent	3,894	1.31%
Aleksandr Semchenko	Christian-Democratic Union - Christians of Russia	3,835	1.29%
against all		43,306	14.59%
Total		296,790	100%

=== 1999 ===
Summary of the 19 December 1999 Russian legislative election in the Sheremetyevo constituency
Candidate	Party	Votes	%
Nikolay Kovalyov	Fatherland – All Russia	105,155	34.00%
Svyatoslav Fyodorov	Andrey Nikolayev and Svyatoslav Fyodorov Bloc	49,449	15.99%
Arkady Murashyov	Union of Right Forces	32,750	10.59%
Fyodor Zheleznov	Independent	24,090	7.79%
Kirill Lyats	Independent	9,305	3.01%
Ksenia Kuleshova	Spiritual Heritage	6,862	2.22%
Pavel Melnikov	Movement in Support of the Army	6,806	2.20%
Yelena Guseva	Independent	6,603	2.14%
Veniamin Dmitriyenko	Party of Pensioners	5,579	1.80%
Sergey Tseluyko	Russian Socialist Party	3,789	1.23%
Aleksandr Bobrovsky	Peace, Labour, May	1,692	0.55%
against all		49,025	15.85%
Total		309,241	100%

=== 2003 ===
Summary of the 7 December 2003 Russian legislative election in the Sheremetyevo constituency
Candidate	Party	Votes	%
Sergey Osadchy	United Russia	121,221	45.69%
Yevgeny Antonenko	Union of Right Forces	27,444	10.34%
Sergey Nikitin	Communist Party	19,705	7.43%
Sergey Zuyev	Independent	16,715	6.30%
Sergey Rubakhin	Party of Russia's Rebirth-Russian Party of Life	7,061	2.66%
Aleksandr Popov	Liberal Democratic Party	6,858	2.58%
Georgy Anisimov	United Russian Party Rus'	4,214	1.59%
Andrey Kobozev	Independent	2,095	0.79%
against all		54,577	20.57%
Total		266,585	100%

=== 2016 ===
Summary of the 18 September 2016 Russian legislative election in the Khovrino constituency
Candidate	Party	Votes	%
Irina Belykh	United Russia	58,401	34.32%
Yelena Pavlova	Communist Party	26,890	15.80%
Mikhail Peskov	Yabloko	17,919	10.53%
Yulia Timoshina	Liberal Democratic Party	16,781	9.86%
Aleksey Alekseyev	A Just Russia	12,471	7.33%
Yana Yaroshevskaya	Rodina	7,380	4.34%
Yekaterina Kolosova	Patriots of Russia	6,682	4.04%
Sergey Korepanov	Communists of Russia	5,460	3.21%
Aleksey Shcherbina	People's Freedom Party	4,921	2.89%
Artur Grokhovsky	The Greens	4,435	2.61%
Vasily Grebenchenko	Civilian Power	2,512	1.48%
Total		169,988	100%

=== 2021 ===
Summary of the 17-19 September 2021 Russian legislative election in the Khovrino constituency
Candidate	Party	Votes	%
Irina Belykh (incumbent)	United Russia	92,008	36.85%
Ivan Ulyanchenko	Communist Party	52,656	21.09%
Arkady Pavlinov	A Just Russia — For Truth	18,249	7.31%
Dmitry Makarenko	New People	16,112	6,45%
Vyacheslav Milovanov	Liberal Democratic Party	13,382	5.36%
Ilya Ulyanov	Communists of Russia	12,477	5.00%
Mikhail Khazin	Rodina	11,499	4.61%
Sergey Ulyanov	Party of Pensioners	6,983	2.80%
Andrey Pangayev	The Greens	5,987	2.40%
Sergey Demin	Party of Growth	4,427	1.77%
Yevgeny Serafontov	Russian Party of Freedom and Justice	4,010	1.61%
Stepan Solovyev	Green Alternative	3,699	1.48%
Yury Yurchenko	Civic Platform	2,546	1.02%
Total		249,671	100%

=== 2026 ===
Summary of the 18-20 September 2026 Russian legislative election in the Khovrino constituency
Candidate	Party	Votes	%
Aleksandr Asafov	United Russia	98,410	39.06%
Sergey Chvyrov	New People	30,046	11.92%
Viktor Kogan-Yasny	Yabloko	28,071	11.14%
Ivan Ulyanchenko	Communist Party	25,145	9.98%
Viktoria Aleynikova	A Just Russia	21,508	8.54%
Valentin Orionov	Liberal Democratic Party	19,774	7.85%
Sergey Ulyanov	Communists of Russia	11,759	4.67%
Anna Buglayeva	The Greens	9,735	3.86%
Maria Kalinina	Party of Direct Democracy	6,619	2.63%
Total		251,975	100%
