= Moscow City Duma District 2 =

Moscow City Duma electoral constituency

- Moscow City Duma constituency
- Deputy: Olga Zaitseva; United Russia
- Administrative Okrug: North-Western, Northern
- Districts: Kurkino, part of Mitino, Molzhaninovsky, part of Severnoye Tushino
- Voters: 159,324 (2024)

Moscow City Duma District 2 is one of 45 constituencies in Moscow City Duma. Currently the district covers outer parts of North-Western and Northern Moscow.

The district has been represented since 2024 by Olympic Champion biathlete Olga Zaitseva (United Russia), who succeeded retiring one-term Independent incumbent Dmitry Loktev, (Note: Loktev was expelled from the Communist Party in February 2021) a historical reenactment club leader.

== Boundaries ==
District boundaries from 2014 to 2024

1993–1997: Basmanny, Krasnoselsky, Tagansky
The district covered eastern parts of Central Moscow.

1997–2005: Basmanny, Krasnoselsky, Meshchansky, Tverskoy
The district was moved westwards, losing Tagansky District to District 3 and gaining Tverskoy and Meshchansky districts from District 1.

2005–2009: Aeroport, Begovoy, Golovinsky, Khoroshyovsky, Koptevo, Savyolovsky, Shchukino, Sokol, Timiryazevsky, Voykovsky
The district was completely reconfigured as it was placed into Northern and North-Western Moscow, overlapping the then-eliminated State Duma Leningradsky constituency.

2009–2014: Aeroport, Begovoy, Golovinsky, Khoroshyovsky, Koptevo, Levoberezhny, Savyolovsky, Sokol, Timiryazevsky, Voykovsky
The district was slightly reconfigured, losing Shchukino to District 17 and gaining Levoberezhny District from District 3.

2014–2024: Kurkino, Molzhaninovsky, Severnoye Tushino, Yuzhnoye Tushino
The district was completely rearranged in the 2014 redistricting as it was moved to cover outer parts of North-Western and Northern Moscow.

2024–present: Kurkino, part of Mitino, Molzhaninovsky, part of Severnoye Tushino
During the 2023–24 Moscow redistricting the district lost Yuzhnoye Tushino and southern half of Severnoye Tushino to District 3, in exchange gaining northern and western Mitino.

== Members elected ==
Election	Member	Party
1993	Nikolay Moskovchenko	Choice of Russia
1997	Mikhail Moskvin-Tarkhanov	Democratic Choice of Russia
2001	Mikhail Moskvin-Tarkhanov	Union of Right Forces
2005	Igor Antonov	United Russia
2009	Igor Antonov	United Russia
2014	Olga Yaroslavskaya	Independent
2019	Dmitry Loktev	Communist Party
2024	Olga Zaitseva	United Russia

== Election results ==
=== 2001 ===
Summary of the 16 December 2001 Moscow City Duma election in District 2
Candidate	Party	Votes	%
Mikhail Moskvin-Tarkhanov (incumbent)	Union of Right Forces	14,399	27.39%
Yelena Karpukhina	Communist Party	12.484	23.75%
Anatoly Andryushchenko	Independent	6,522	12.41%
Irina Botsu	Independent	5,365	10.21%
Ksenia Nazarova	Independent	2,823	5.37%
Vadim Kazachenko	Liberal Democratic Party	2,040	3.88%
against all		7,396	14.07%
Total		53,182	100%

=== 2005 ===
Summary of the 4 December 2005 Moscow City Duma election in District 2
Candidate	Party	Votes	%
Igor Antonov (incumbent) (Note: redistricted from District 4)	United Russia	45,984	29.34%
Irina Rukina (incumbent) (Note: redistricted from District 6)	Russian Party of Life	33,144	21.15%
Vladimir Ulas	Communist Party	32,107	20.49%
Tatyana Filippova	Rodina	20,529	13.10%
Aleksey Anisimov	Liberal Democratic Party	8,559	5.46%
Marina Godovanets	Independent	7,477	4.77%
Total		156,730	100%

=== 2009 ===
Summary of the 11 October 2009 Moscow City Duma election in District 2
Candidate	Party	Votes	%
Igor Antonov (incumbent)	United Russia	90,880	58.12%
Vladimir Ulas	Communist Party	30,420	19.46%
Vyacheslav Gumenyuk	A Just Russia	10,866	6.95%
Yelena Guseva	Independent	10,256	6.56%
Natalya Konshina	Liberal Democratic Party	6,085	3.89%
Rustam Rabadanov	Independent	1,831	1.17%
Total		156,355	100%

=== 2014 ===
Summary of the 14 September 2014 Moscow City Duma election in District 3
Candidate	Party	Votes	%
Olga Yaroslavskaya	Independent	13,061	38.63%
Yelena Shmeleva	Communist Party	7,604	22.49%
Mikhail Peskov	Yabloko	5,444	16.10%
Sergey Tsapenko	A Just Russia	3,399	10.05%
Svetlana Zolotaryova	Independent	1,851	5.47%
Yegor Anisimov	Liberal Democratic Party	1,266	3.74%
Total		33,814	100%

=== 2019 ===
Summary of the 8 September 2019 Moscow City Duma election in District 2
Candidate	Party	Votes	%
Dmitry Loktev	Communist Party	15,091	39.80%
Svetlana Volovets	Independent	14,079	37.13%
Andrey Petrov	Liberal Democratic Party	3,456	9.12%
Vladislav Zhukov	A Just Russia	2,809	7.41%
Pavel Rassudov	Independent	1,046	2.76%
Total		37,914	100%

=== 2024 ===
Summary of the 6–8 September 2024 Moscow City Duma election in District 2
Candidate	Party	Votes	%
Olga Zaitseva	United Russia	33,974	53.33%
Stanislav Murashev	New People	7,848	12.32%
Vitaly Fedotov	Liberal Democratic Party	6,152	9.66%
Konstantin Loginov	Communist Party	5,171	8.12%
Ivan Melnikov	A Just Russia – For Truth	4,311	6.77%
Kirill Lukonin	The Greens	3,181	4.99%
Yevgeny Lagunov	Communists of Russia	3,044	4.78%
Total		63,710	100%
