= Tushino constituency =

Russian legislative constituency

Tushino single-member constituency
- Constituency of the Russian State Duma
- Deputy: Eduard Kazymov; United Russia
- Federal subject: Moscow
- Districts: North-Western AO (Khoroshyovo-Mnyovniki, Mitino, Pokrovskoye-Streshnevo, Shchukino, Yuzhnoye Tushino), Northern Administrative Okrug (Sokol, Voykovsky)
- Voters: 492,963 (2026)

The Tushino constituency (No.205 (Note: North-Western constituency No.200 in 1993-1995, No.200 in 1995-2007, No.206 in 2016–2026)) is a Russian legislative constituency in Moscow. The constituency covers most of North-Western Moscow and parts of western Northern Moscow

The constituency has been represented since 2026 by United Russia deputy Eduard Kazymov, Hero of Russia and retired Russian Navy guards captain, who won the open seat, succeeding one-term United Russia incumbent Aleksandr Mazhuga.

== Boundaries ==
1993–1995 North-Western constituency: North-Western Administrative Okrug (Khoroshyovo-Mnyovniki District, Kurkino District, Mitino District, Pokrovskoye-Streshnevo District, Severnoye Tushino District, Shchukino District, Strogino District, Yuzhnoye Tushino District)
The constituency covered all of North-Western Moscow.

1995–2003: North-Western Administrative Okrug (Khoroshyovo-Mnyovniki District, Kurkino District, Mitino District, Pokrovskoye-Streshnevo District, Severnoye Tushino District, Shchukino District, Yuzhnoye Tushino District)
Following the 1995 redistricting the constituency was slightly changed, losing Strogino to Kuntsevo constituency.

2003–2007: North-Western Administrative Okrug (Khoroshyovo-Mnyovniki District, Kurkino District, Mitino District, Pokrovskoye-Streshnevo District, Severnoye Tushino District, Shchukino District, Strogino District)
After the 2003 redistricting the constituency was altered, losing Yuzhnoye Tushino to Leningradsky constituency. This seat instead re-gained Strogino from Kuntsevo constituency.

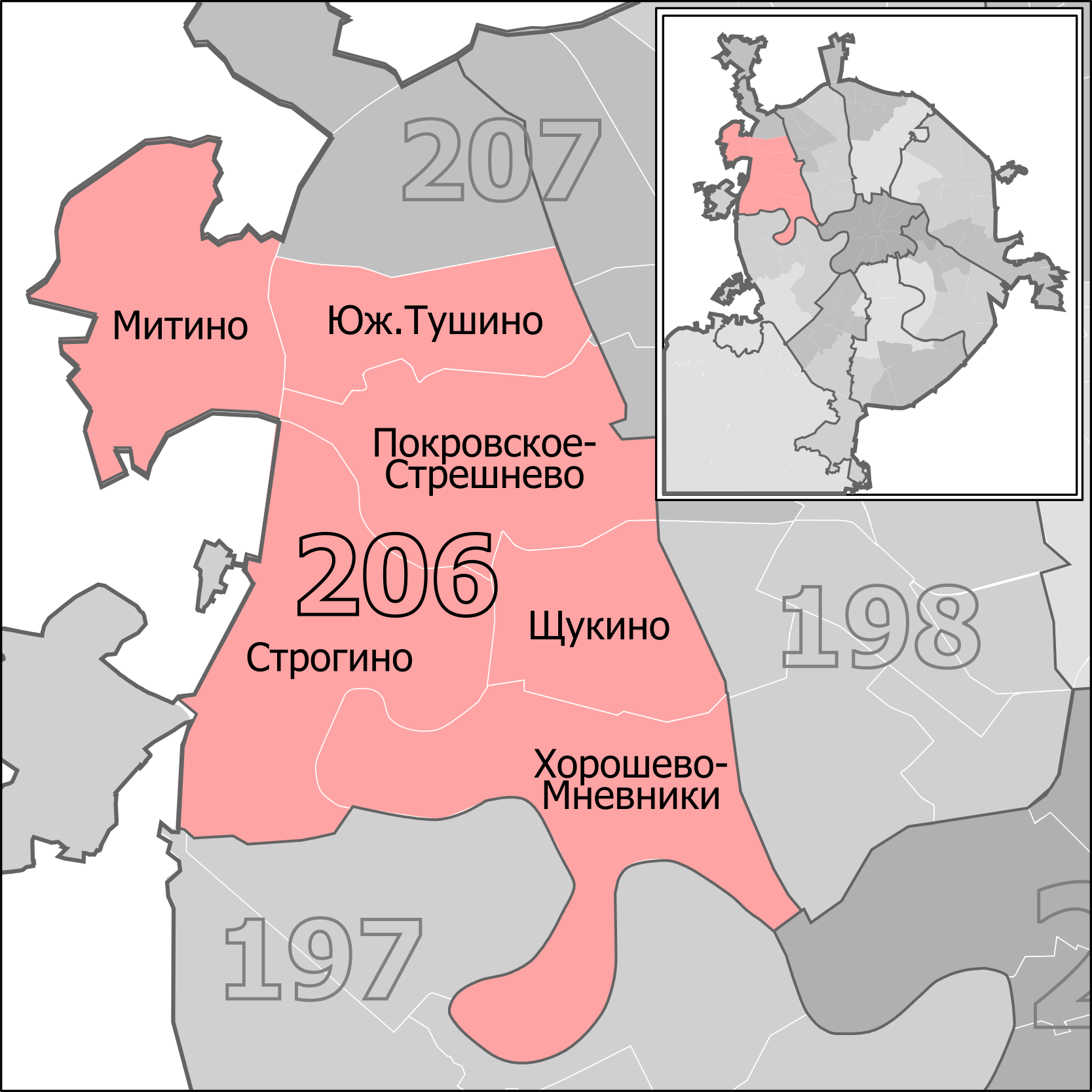
Constituency boundaries from 2016 to 2026

2016–2026: North-Western Administrative Okrug (Khoroshyovo-Mnyovniki District, Mitino District, Pokrovskoye-Streshnevo District, Shchukino District, Strogino District, Yuzhnoye Tushino District)
The constituency was re-created for the 2016 election and retained most of its former territory, losing Kurkino and Severnoye Tushino to Khovrino constituency. This seat instead re-gained Yuzhnoye Tushino from Leningradsky constituency.

2026–present: North-Western Administrative Okrug (Khoroshyovo-Mnyovniki District, Mitino District, Pokrovskoye-Streshnevo District, Shchukino District, Yuzhnoye Tushino District), Northern Administrative Okrug (Sokol District, Voykovsky District)
The constituency was slightly changed following the 2025 redistricting, losing Strogino to Kuntsevo constituency. This seat instead gained Northern Moscow districts Sokol from Leningradsky constituency and Voykovsky from Khovrino constituency.

== Members elected ==
Election	Member	Party
1993	Yury Vlasov	Independent
1995	Konstantin Borovoy	Party of Economic Freedom
1999	Aleksandr Shokhin (Note: in 2002 appointed to the Supervisory Board of Renaissance Capital)	Independent
2003	Vladimir Vasilyev	United Russia
2007	Proportional representation - no election by constituency	
2011	Proportional representation - no election by constituency	
2016	Gennady Onishchenko	United Russia
2021	Aleksandr Mazhuga	United Russia
2026	Eduard Kazymov	United Russia

== Election results ==
=== 1993 ===
Summary of the 12 December 1993 Russian legislative election in the North-Western constituency
Candidate	Party	Votes	%
Yury Vlasov	Independent	59,396	23.13%
Konstantin Borovoy	Independent	54,419	21.19%
Aleksey Surkov	Choice of Russia	31,527	12.27%
Yury Shatalov	Yavlinky–Boldyrev–Lukin	19,789	7.70%
Sergey Tsyplakov	Civic Union	19,543	7.61%
Aleksey Zvyagin	Liberal Democratic Party	9,543	3.72%
Irina Kaminskaya	Kedr	6,723	2.62%
Vladimir Stolypin	Democratic Party	6,254	2.43%
Igor Glinka	Russian Democratic Reform Movement	5,466	2.13%
against all		29,369	11.43%
Total		256,845	100%

=== 1995 ===
Summary of the 17 December 1995 Russian legislative election in the Tushino constituency
Candidate	Party	Votes	%
Konstantin Borovoy	Party of Economic Freedom	42,253	14.34%
Yury Vlasov (incumbent)	Independent	35,450	11.75%
Valery Shumakov	Independent	31,178	10.34%
Andrey Akopyan	Independent	28,725	9.52%
Tatyana Melnikova	Communist Party	19,460	6.45%
Konstantin Solovyov	Stanislav Govorukhin Bloc	18,663	6.19%
Galina Leskova	Kedr	16,270	5.39%
Yury Shatalov	Pamfilova–Gurov–Lysenko	12,286	4.07%
Valery Aleksin	Independent	10,672	3.54%
Igor Adarchenko	Forward, Russia!	10,214	3.39%
Vladimir Gusev	Communists and Working Russia - for the Soviet Union	9,454	3.13%
Sergey Tsyplakov	Congress of Russian Communities	7,094	2.35%
Lidia Maleyeva	Independent	6,533	2.17%
Larisa Vladimirova	Independent	3,867	1.28%
Anatoly Kuntsevich	Liberal Democratic Party	3,848	1.28%
Vladimir Gnezdilov	Independent	2,774	0.92%
Aleksandr Glod	Tikhonov-Tupolev-Tikhonov	2,258	0.75%
Aleksandr Grinin	Derzhava	1,753	0.58%
Irina Lipinskaya	Independent	1,233	0.41%
against all		30,337	10.06%
Total		301,626	100%

=== 1999 ===
Summary of the 19 December 1999 Russian legislative election in the Tushino constituency
Candidate	Party	Votes	%
Aleksandr Shokhin	Independent	91,661	28.81%
Yevgeny Velikhov	Fatherland – All Russia	71,983	22.62%
Konstantin Borovoy (incumbent)	Union of Right Forces	27,115	8.52%
Yury Pankratov	Movement in Support of the Army	23,354	7.34%
Konstantin Solovyov	Independent	18,437	5.79%
Ivan Okhlobystin	Kedr	12,955	4.07%
Sergey Glubokov	Liberal Democratic Party	4,397	1.38%
Anatoly Chekhovoy	Andrey Nikolayev and Svyatoslav Fyodorov Bloc	3,753	1.18%
Aleksandr Inozemtsev	Independent	3,440	1.08%
Aleksandr Demin	Independent	3,242	1.02%
Vladislav Tyshchenko	Spiritual Heritage	3,136	0.99%
against all		46,489	14.61%
Total		318,189	100%

=== 2003 ===
Summary of the 7 December 2003 Russian legislative election in the Tushino constituency
Candidate	Party	Votes	%
Vladimir Vasilyev	United Russia	64,871	23.59%
Sergey Ivanenko	Yabloko	42,400	15.42%
Mikhail Dvornikov	Independent	31,071	11.31%
Yury Sinelshchikov	Communist Party	23,623	8.59%
Aleksandra Ochirova	Independent	22,887	8.32%
Yury Vasilyev	People's Party	11,881	4.32%
Mikhail Nenashev	Independent	7,354	2.67%
Mikhail Sukhinin	Party of Russia's Rebirth-Russian Party of Life	4,291	1.56%
Andrey Sharomov	Union of People for Education and Science	3,152	1.15%
Maksim Gritsay	Independent	2,913	1.06%
Sergey Devichinsky	United Russian Party Rus'	1,413	0.51%
against all		53,954	19.62%
Total		276,282	100%

=== 2016 ===
Summary of the 18 September 2016 Russian legislative election in the Tushino constituency
Candidate	Party	Votes	%
Gennady Onishchenko	United Russia	41,041	25.20%
Dmitry Gudkov	Yabloko	32,147	19.74%
Igor Korotchenko	Rodina	28,248	17.34%
Sergey Baburin	Communist Party	20,007	12.28%
Ilya Sviridov	A Just Russia	10,655	6.54%
Sergey Marusov	Liberal Democratic Party	9,864	6.06%
Igor Vittel	Party of Growth	5,764	3.54%
Pyotr Pakhomov	Communists of Russia	3,839	2.36%
Aleksandr Shumsky	Civic Platform	3,083	1.89%
Dmitry Chugunov	Civilian Power	1,925	1.18%
Eduard Bagirov	Patriots of Russia	1,042	0.64%
Total		162,876	100%

=== 2021 ===
Results by district: Aleksandr Mazhuga: 40–50%; Andrey Grebennik: 20–30% 30–40% 40–50%

Summary of the 17-19 September 2021 Russian legislative election in the Tushino constituency
Candidate	Party	Votes	%
Aleksandr Mazhuga	United Russia	79,355	34.76%
Andrey Grebennik	Communist Party	56,581	24.78%
Maria Ivanova	New People	20,873	9.14%
Sergey Andropov	Party of Pensioners	14,751	6.46%
Aleksey Tsyba	A Just Russia — For Truth	12,394	5.43%
Irina Kopkina	Yabloko	11,240	4.92%
Aleksandr Vasilyev	Communists of Russia	9,646	4.22%
Svyatoslav Alyrin	Liberal Democratic Party	9,404	4.12%
Mikhail Misharin	The Greens	5,152	2.26%
Mikhail Ponomarev	Russian Party of Freedom and Justice	4,084	1.79%
Total		228,313	100%

=== 2026 ===
Summary of the 18-20 September 2026 Russian legislative election in the Tushino constituency
Candidate	Party	Votes	%
Eduard Kazymov	United Russia	86,702	35.37%
Yevgeny Biktuganov	Yabloko	31,670	12.92%
Aleksandr Ishchenko	Communist Party	31,231	12.74%
Aleksey Balin	New People	30,564	12.47%
Dmitry Lesnyak	Liberal Democratic Party	20,229	8.25%
Mikhail Kislitsky	A Just Russia	14,191	5.79%
Arkady Agranat	The Greens	11,734	4.79%
Aleksandr Ishchuk	Communists of Russia	9,286	3.79%
Gennady Goncharov	Party of Direct Democracy	8,300	3.39%
Total		245,144	100%
