= Kurkino =

Kurkino may refer to:

- Kurkino District, a district in the North-Western Administrative Okrug of Moscow, Russia
- Kurkino (inhabited locality), name of several inhabited localities in Russia
