= Vittel (disambiguation) =

Vittel is a commune in the Vosges department, France.

Vittel may also refer to:

- Vittel (brand), a French mineral water brand
- Igor Vittel, a Russian journalist and TV personality
- CS Vittel, a former football club in Vittel, France
