= Businovo District =

Former district in Moscow, Russia

Coordinates: 55.8825°N 37.4917°E

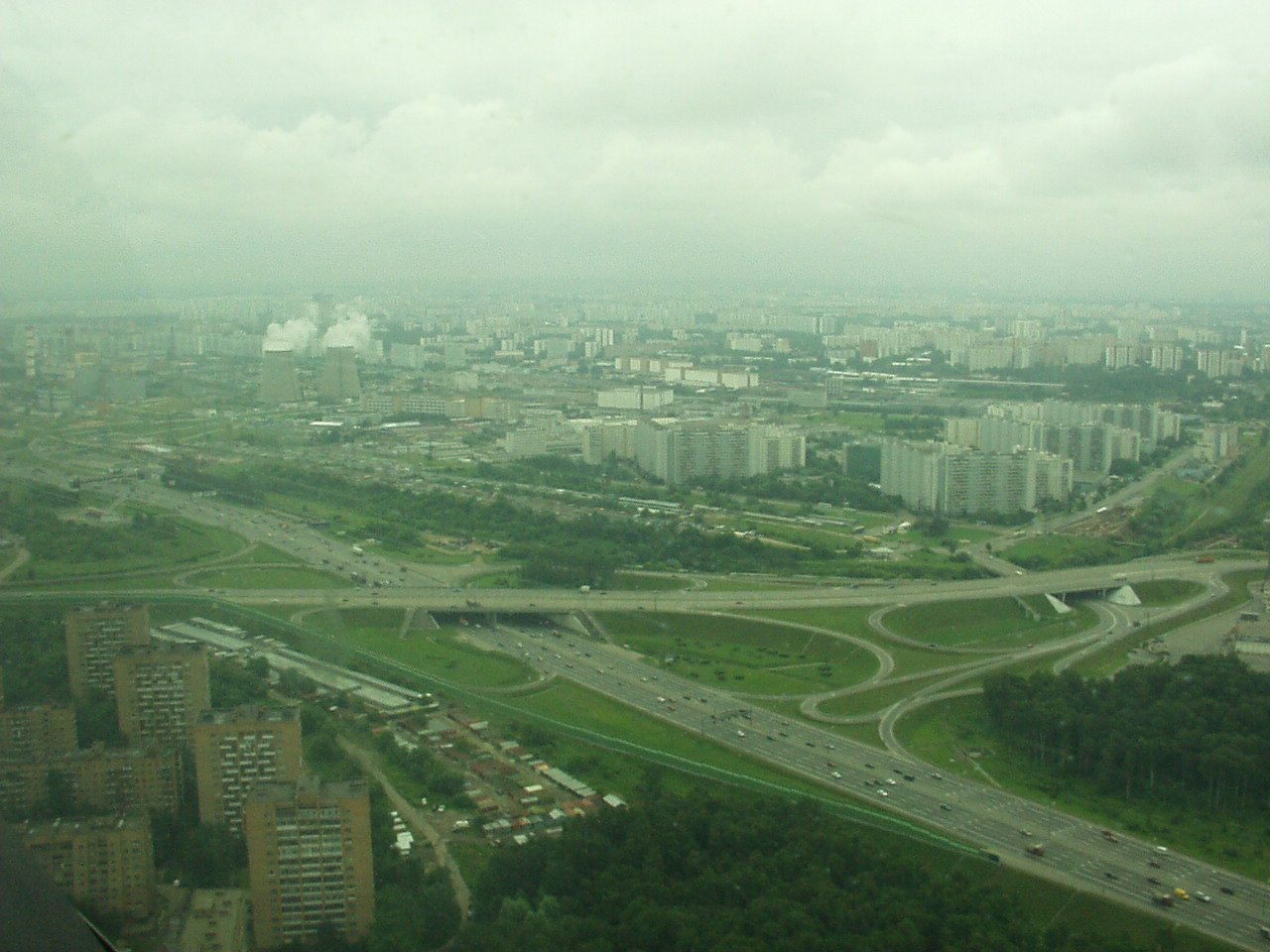
Businovo with the MKAD in foreground

Businovo District (Russian: Буси́ново) was formerly a district in the north of Moscow, Russia.

The village of Busino (Бусино) was first mentioned in the 16th century; its name is derived from "Ivan Busa", the name of a local merchant in 1547, whose son was known as "Busin". The record books of 1584–1586 referred to the village as "Kokorevo (Кокорево), also known as Businovo". In 1685, the village was a part of the lands owned by the Novodevichy Convent.

In 1912, the village comprised 75 households. In 1960, the community it was completely absorbed by Moscow and turned into a typical late Soviet sleeping district.

In 1991, as a result of Moscow's administrative reform, Businovo District was established.

Located close to the MKAD, Businovo was one of the northernmost districts of Moscow. It bordered Khovrino District in the west and Khimki in the north. Its area was approximately 2.8 square kilometers (1.1 sq mi). It had only three streets that circled it. There were two schools, two kindergartens, a music school, a municipal library, a polyclinic, and a militsiya station in the district. The closest metro station was Rechnoy Vokzal.

The district existed until August 22, 1997, when its territory was formally merged into Zapadnoye Degunino District.

Cogeneration plant (TETs-21) located on the eastern edge of Businovo is the largest in Europe in terms of generated heat with an estimated power 4,958 Gcal/h.
