= Western Choice =

Western Choice Западный выбор
- Chairman: Konstantin Borovoi
- Founders: Konstantin Borovoi; Valeriya Novodvorskaya; Alexei Devotchenko
- Founded: 17 March 2013
- Registered: 9 December 2013
- Dissolved: 1 August 2014
- Preceded by: Democratic Union
- Membership (1 Oct 2013): >2,000
- Ideology: Liberalism; Liberal democracy Libertarianism; Anti-communism; Pro-Europeanism; Atlanticism
- Political position: Centre-right
- International affiliation: Transnational Radical Party
- Colours: Blue; Orange

Website
- westchoice.ru (archived)

The Western Choice (Russian: Западный выбор, romanized: Zapadnyy vybor) was a Russian short-lived liberal political party founded in 2013 by opposition politicians Konstantin Borovoi and Valeriya Novodvorskaya. Konstantin Borovoi was elected chairman of the party.

Registered with the Ministry of Justice of the Russian Federation on December 9, 2013. The state registration of the party was canceled on August 1, 2014.

== History ==
The ideologists of the creation of a new party in November 2012 were the chairman of the Party of Economic Freedom Konstantin Borovoi and the chairwoman of the Democratic Union party Valeriya Novodvorskaya. The founders presented their project on the air of Radio Liberty, explaining that they aim to create a broad electoral party based on the principle laid down in the name, which includes the concepts of freedom, legality, market economy, democracy and humanism.

On 28 November 2012, the Initiative Group of the Western Choice Party was created. The Facebook page has become the main platform for the work of the initiative group, where within a few weeks the number of party supporters reached 500 people. In January 2013, the group prepared drafts of the party program, authored by Valeria Novodvorskaya, and its charter, the main developer of which was the lawyer Vadim Danilenko.

On 6 January 2013, the group decided to register the party with the Ministry of Justice of the Russian Federation. The organizing committee of the party was created, which included 16 people. The first official meeting was held on 19 January 2013 at the Sakharov Center. The application for the preparation, convening and holding of the Constituent Party Congress was registered with the Ministry of Justice of the Russian Federation on 22 January 2013 under No. 15-4559/13. An announcement about the creation of the party was published in Rossiyskaya Gazeta. The organizing committee decided to hold the founding congress of the party on 17 March 2013. The announcement of this was published on February 6 in Rossiyskaya Gazeta.

The founding congress of the party was held on March 17, 2013. Borovoy was elected chairman of the party, the Bureau of its Central Coordinating Council included secretary Yu.P. Zarubina and heads of departments A.I. Mavrodi (Moscow), V.G. Danilenko (Moscow region), A.E. Yankovsky (Novosibirsk), N.N. Gulevskaya (Stavropol) and T.Kh. Khairullin (St. Petersburg). In the spring, party leaders visited a number of cities in Russia, where they held meetings with the public and the press and presented new party branches.

On December 9, 2013, the Western Choice party was registered by the Ministry of Justice. The main provisions of the party program were officially published in Rossiyskaya Gazeta. Information about the party was also included in the 2nd edition of the publication “Political Parties in the Russian Federation”, published in 2014.

== Party goals ==
The Western Choice party declared its task to familiarize Russia with universal human values. Members of the party called Juraj Križanić, Prince Mikhail of Tver, Pyotr Chaadayev, Sergei Witte, Vladimir Solovyov, Andrei Sakharov, Yegor Gaidar, Galina Starovoytova and Sergei Yushenkov their ideological predecessors, and among their goals they declared the withdrawal of Russian troops from foreign territories, Russia's entry into the EU and NATO, the abolition of institutions for military service and registration, the ban on communist symbols, the release of political prisoners, the privatization of state property, etc.

== Actions ==
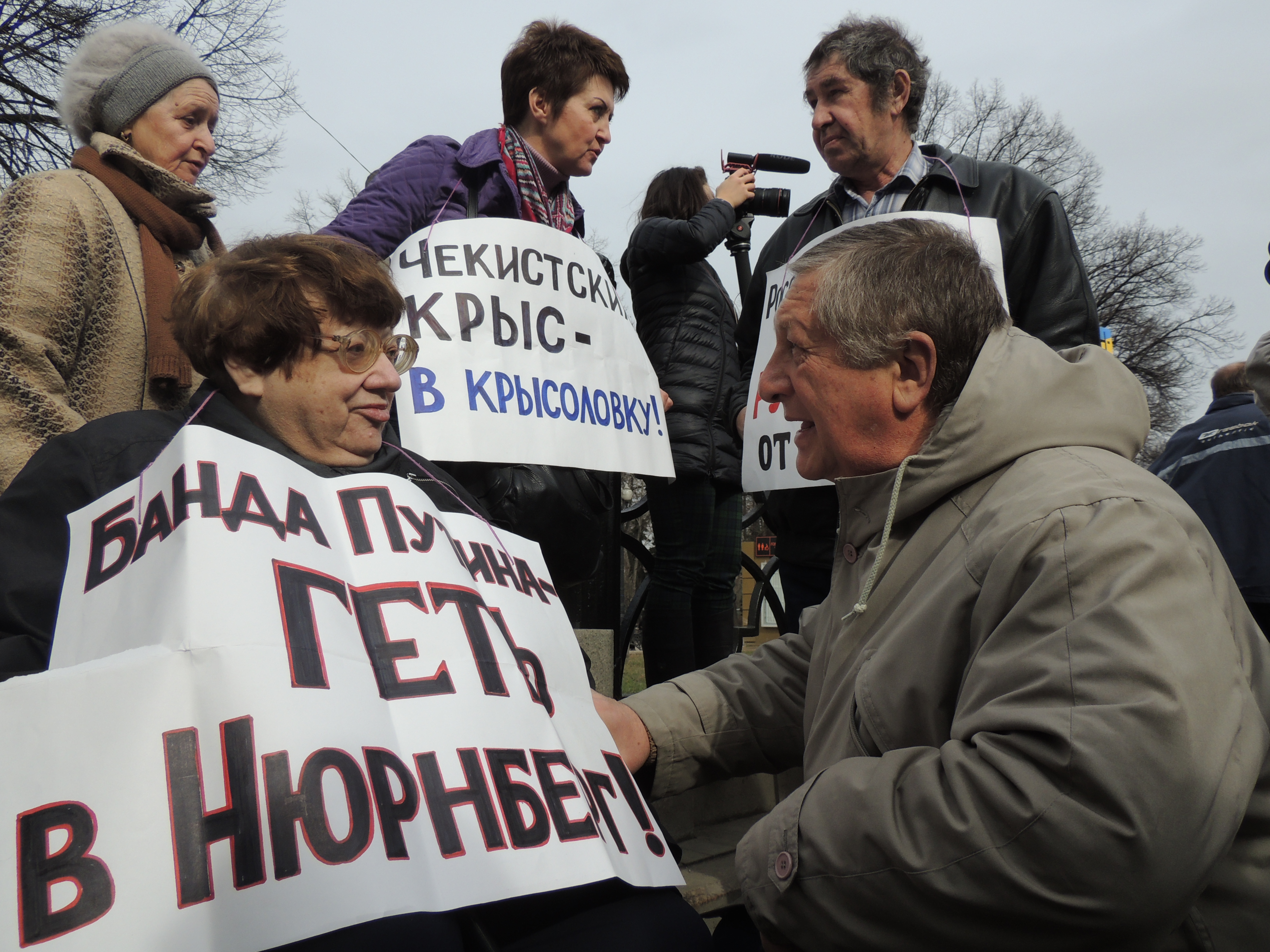
Leaders of the Western Choice party Valeria Novodvorskaya and Konstantin Borovoy at the Peace March on March 15, 2014

During its existence, the party regularly issued political statements and appeals, including those on events in Ukraine. Among them:

- Statement on the "Prohibition of Propaganda of Homosexuality" Law;
- Statement "For your and our Maidans";
- Statement “The people of Ukraine have risen! Glory to Ukraine! Glory to the heroes!";
- Statement to the leaders of the EU and US countries "Stop Russia's aggression against Ukraine";
- Petition to international parliamentary organizations, PACE and parliaments of democratic states;
- Statement against the Syrian adventure of Vladimir Putin and other

On December 12, 2013, the Western Choice party held a picket in defense of the Russian Constitution, on March 2, 2014, it came out with a picket in support of Euromaidan in front of the Ukrainian Embassy, and on March 15, 2014, took part in the Peace March rally in Moscow.

In March 2014, the head of the Kaliningrad regional branch of the party, Oleg Savvin, was arrested for hanging the German flag in the garage of the regional FSB. In April, the head of the regional branch of the party in Chechnya, Asya Gazhaeva, was detained.

A series of solitary actions in Moscow was undertaken by party activist Ekaterina Maldon, pickets and events with the participation of party members were also held in Volgograd and Tolyatti. In 2015, Maldon, Konstantin Golava, as well as a member of the party, the editor of the opposition publications Amurburg and Newsader, which regularly provided it with an information platform, were forced to emigrate.

== Deregistration ==
According to the laws of the Russian Federation in force at that time, in order to complete the state registration procedure, within 6 months, a political party had to register branches in at least half of the country's constituent entities. Only 25 out of 52 created branches of the Western Choice party were registered on time, so the required minimum was not reached, and therefore on August 1, 2014, the registration of the party was officially canceled.

A month earlier, on July 12, 2014, the ideologist of the Western Choice party, Valeriya Novodvorskaya, died. On November 5, actor and party activist Alexei Devotchenko died. On November 20, opposition journalist, head of the Kamchatka branch of the party Igor Kravchuk died.

Western Choice continued to exist as an unregistered party, and then as a political club and discussion platform. The party did not make a formal decision to dissolve itself, and its leaders Konstantin Borovoy and the head of the Stavropol branch Natalya Gulevskaya continued to publish materials and comment on the agenda under her name. In 2018, they introduced the new heads of the Moscow (Dmitry Kulish) and St. Petersburg (Marina Ken) branches of the party, who organized a number of protest actions in their cities. In 2019, Borovoy asked for asylum in the United States, and civil activist Marina Ken left the country the following year.

== Party members ==
- Konstantin Borovoi — Russian businessman and politician.
- Valeriya Novodvorskaya — Russian politician and dissident.
- Alexei Devotchenko — Russian theater and film actor, Merited Artist of the Russian Federation.
- Nikolai Khramov — coordinator of the Russian branch of the Transnational Radical Party.
- Alexander Shatalov — Soviet and Russian poet, critic, publisher, TV presenter.
- Arkady Yankovsky — Novosibirsk liberal politician, deputy of the State Duma of the Russian Federation 1995-1999.
- Konstantin Golava - LGBTQ- and civil-activist

== Criticism ==
In April 2014, State Duma deputy from the LDPR Roman Khudyakov sent an appeal to the Ministry of Justice of the Russian Federation with a request to check the legality of the activities of the Western Choice party. In particular, the deputy was outraged by the Russian party's support for the new authorities of Ukraine and the Right Sector movement recognized in Russia as extremist.
