= Alexander Mazhuga =

Russian politician

Alexander Mazhuga MP
- Александр Мажуга
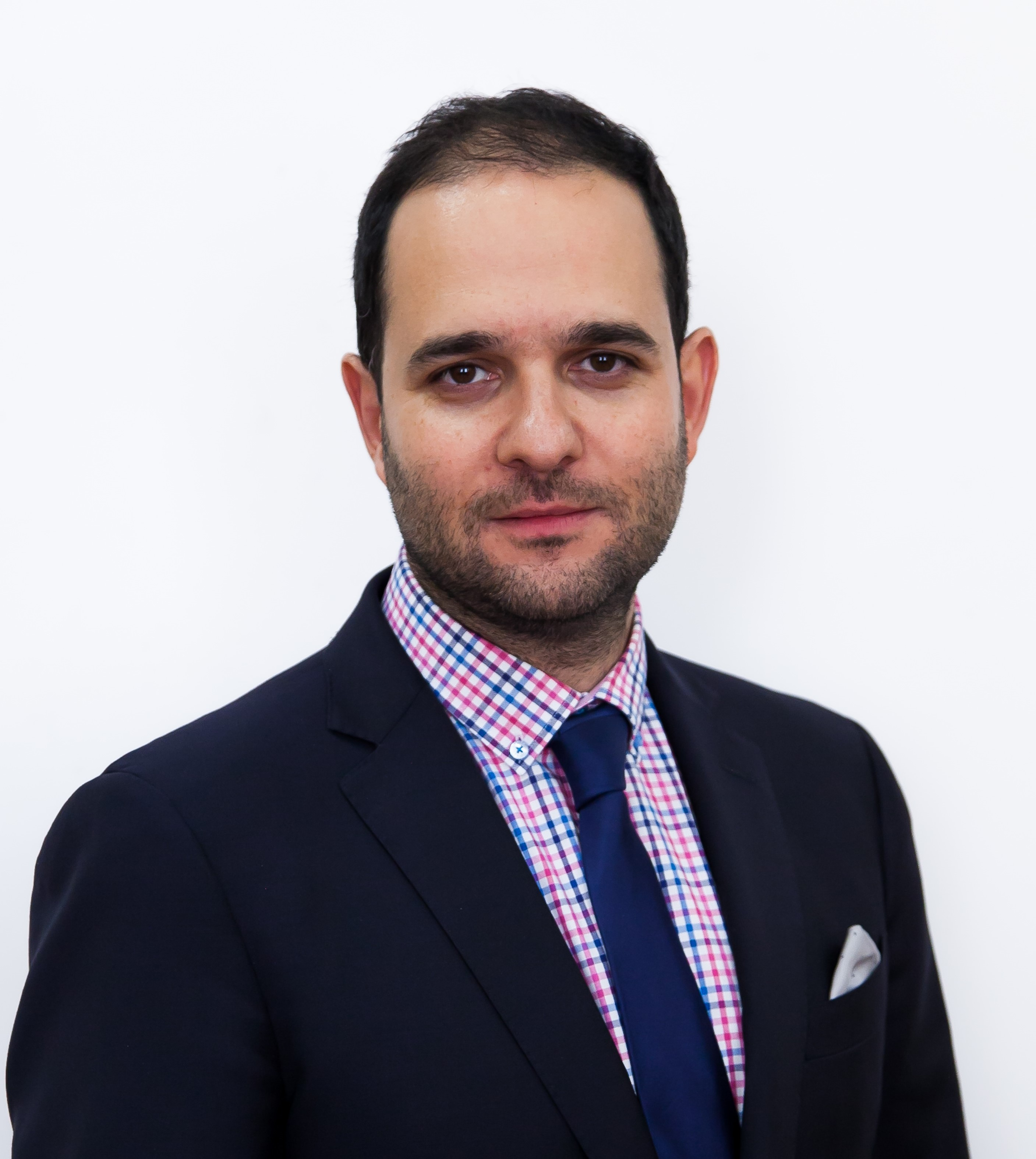

Member of the State Duma for Moscow
- Incumbent
- Assumed office 12 October 2021
- Preceded by: Gennady Onishchenko
- Constituency: Tushino (No. 206)

Personal details
- Born: 6 August 1980 (age 46) Moscow, RSFSR, USSR
- Party: United Russia
- Education: Moscow State University
- Occupation: Chemist; Academic

Alexander Georgievich Mazhuga (also spelled as Majouga, Russian: Александр Георгиевич Мажуга; born 6 August 1980, Moscow) is a Russian political figure and a deputy of the 8th State Duma. In 2013, he was granted a Doctor of Sciences in Chemistry degree.

In 2003, Mazhuga started working at the MSU Faculty of Chemistry. He is an author of scientific 15 patents, including international ones. From 2018 to 2021, he headed the D. Mendeleev University of Chemical Technology of Russia. Since September 2021, he has served as deputy of the 8th State Duma. On 12 October 2021 he became the First Deputy Chairman of the State Duma Committee on Science and Higher Education.

In 2019, Mazhuga took 44th place among the 118 youngest scientists in the world.

In February 2022 voted for recognition of the independence of Donetsk People's Republic and Luhansk People's Republic. Publicly supported the Russian invasion of Ukraine.

Expressed concerns about potential development of the biological weapon in the eastern Ukraine and warned about the potential use of the biological weapon against Russia.

== Sanctions ==
He has been sanctioned by the European Union, Switzerland, the United Kingdom, and the U.S.
