= Hovrinskaya Hospital =

Hospital in Russia

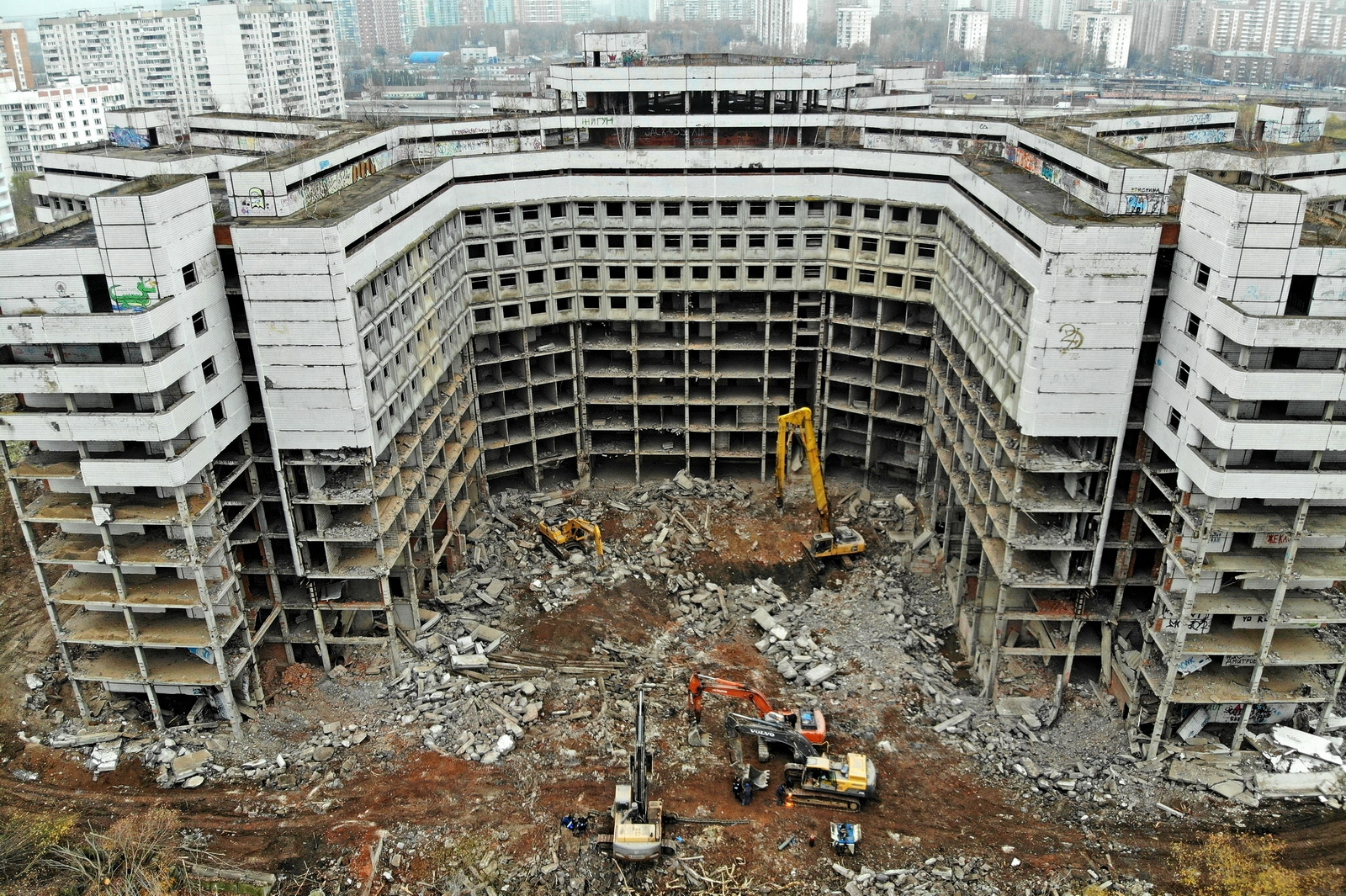
- Demolishing Hovrinskaya Hospital, November 6, 2018

Geography
- Location: Moscow, Russia

History
- Constructed: 1980-1985
- Opened: never opened
- Demolished: November 6, 2018

Links
- Lists: Hospitals in Russia

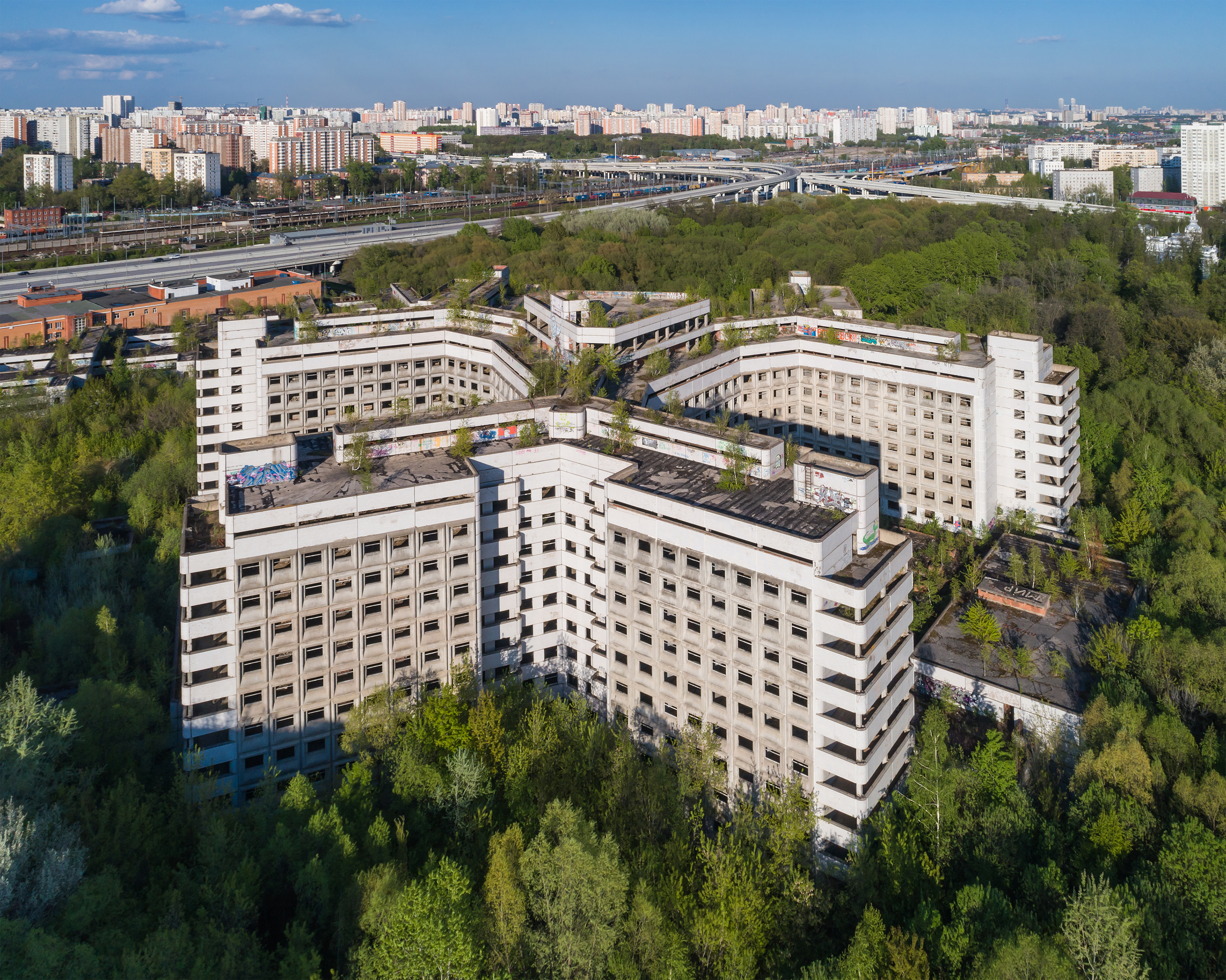
Aerial view, May 2017

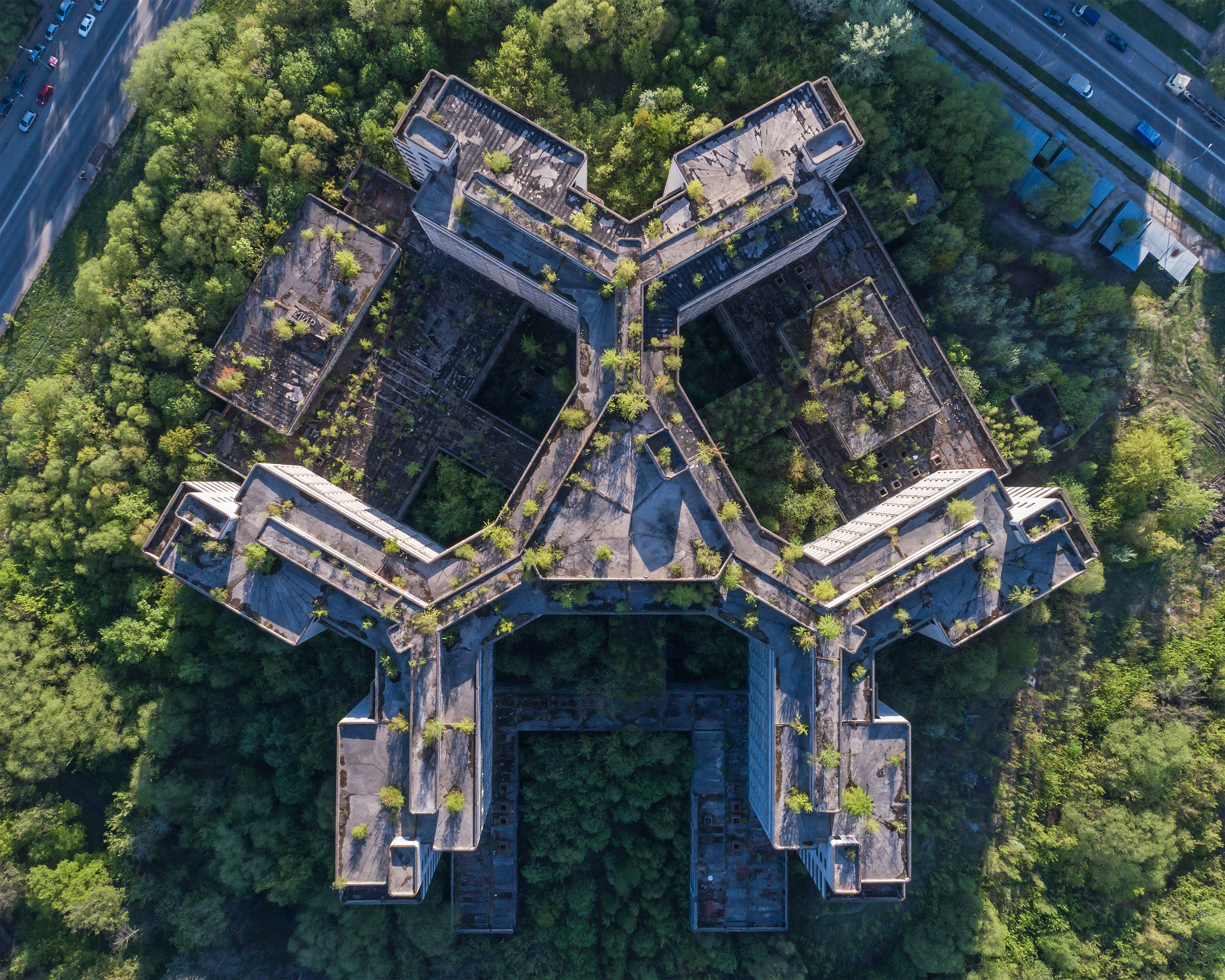
Aerial view, May 2017

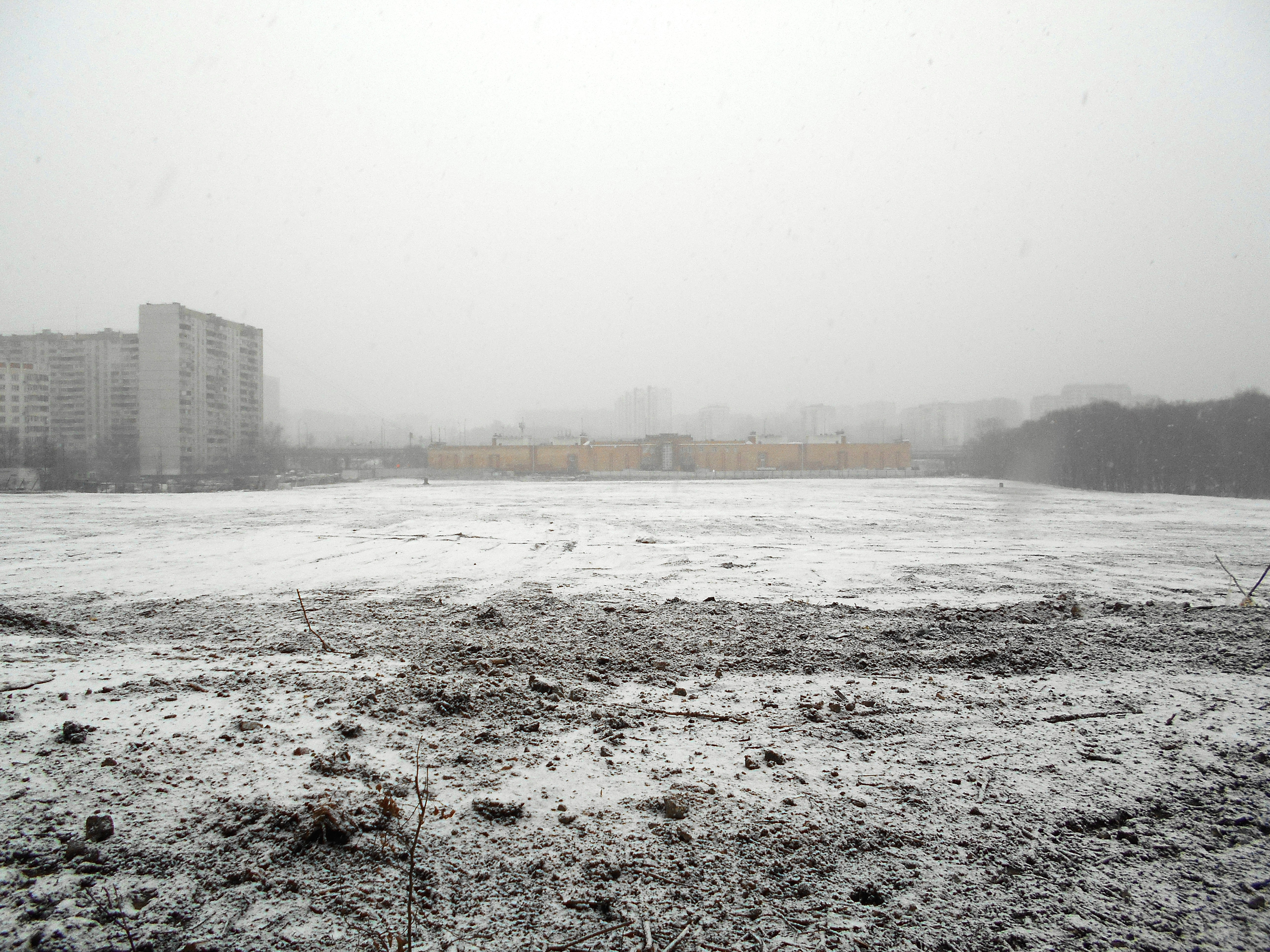
The place where Hovrinskaya hospital stood, March 24, 2019

Hovrinskaya hospital (Russian: Ховринская больница; HZB, Hovrinka, Umbrella, Unfinished) was an abandoned building in the Hovrino District of Moscow in the Hovrino area, near the railway station of the same name.

The building had a design which was also common to many others found within the Soviet Union. The hospital was designed to resemble the shape of a star, with branching corridors at the end of each point. The three wings of the building came together at a central point to form three courtyards with porches. Placed adjacent to the main building was an annex which housed the pathology department.

3D photogrammetry model of Hovrino hospital site (2017)

Due to the unfinished construction, parts of the building only contained fragments of walls and floors, with the basement also prone to flooding. Explanations for the abandonment of construction range from a lack of funding to possible shortcomings which emerged in the project and led to its abandonment. According to a map of Moscow from 1952, the hospital was to be built by the river Likhoborka and surrounding wetlands with sewage treatment facilities located nearby.

The abandoned building was well known among fans of urban legends as one of the most mysterious places in Moscow. Among urban explorers, the hospital earned the name "The Umbrella"' due to its resemblance to the logo of the Umbrella Corporation from the video game and film series Resident Evil and its similarity to the biohazard symbol.

One local urban explorer who took people through the building told British journalist Aliide Naylor that it was generally populated by "the homeless, drug addicts and other unpleasant personalities" as well as adrenaline-fuelled teenagers interested in the hobby. It is also the title-place of one of the chapters of the book I Love Russia: Reporting from a Lost Country by Elena Kostyuchenko, in which many of its inhabitants and stories are portrayed.

== History ==
Construction of the hospital began in 1980 and was suspended in 1985. Since then, the building remained unfinished and dilapidated until its demolition in 2018.

The hospital was designed to have a capacity of 1300 beds, and was constructed in the architectural style of brutalism.

Since the mid-1980s, the hospital was a frequent place for urban explorers and industrial climbers to visit. Related to the building are urban legends about the ghosts of hospital staff, satanists, the homeless, and other criminal elements. In 1990, a woman was murdered inside the hospital building and at the end of March 2011 an urban photographer was the victim of an armed assault inside the building. Due to the dangers of the unfinished construction and the dangers to visitors, the hospital was considered unsafe by the surrounding community.

On the second floor of the building, there was a memorial dedicated to Alexey Krayushkin, a 16-year-old boy who had committed suicide in 2005 when he threw himself down an open elevator shaft in the building. On the walls of the unfinished building there was a large amount of graffiti, the most famous of which read: "This hospital - the land of miracles: have gone into it and disappeared".

In July 2012 a decision was made to demolish the buildings and begin the construction of two new buildings, and in October of the same year the building and the land were put up for auction (auction held in December 2012) for an initial value of nearly 1.8 billion rubles which some experts believe was significantly overestimated.

On November 15, 2014, the Deputy Mayor for urban policy and the construction of Marat Khusnullin stated that the building would be put up for demolition to prepare for the construction of a new health care facility.

At the end of March 2015, it was again announced that the government was considering the possibility of demolishing Hovrinskaya Hospital (with an estimated cost of - 0,8-1 billion rubles). In April 2016 the city authorities announced that the dismantling of the building would begin in the following summer and plans were again made to sell the land at auction to attract investors.

In the second half of 2015, plans were made to start the filming a Blair Witch-style horror documentary called "Hovrino" about the abandoned hospital.

Hovrinskaya Hospital was demolished in October and November 2018.
