= Irina Belykh =

Russian politician

Irina Belykh MP
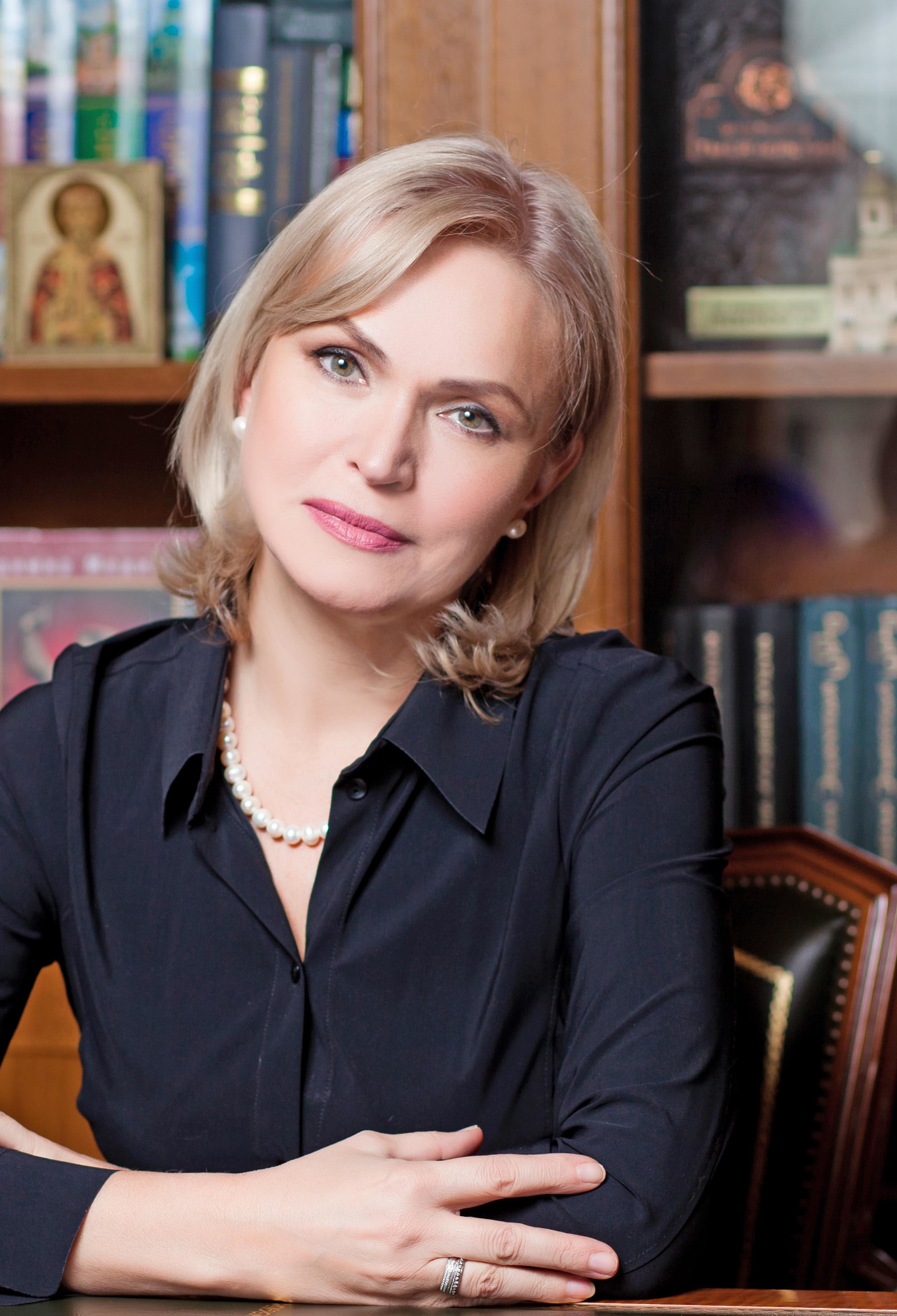

Chairman of the State Duma committee of the on education
- Incumbent
- Assumed office 17 September 2024
- Preceded by: Olga Kazakova

Deputy of the State Duma Russia
- Incumbent
- Assumed office 18 September 2016
- Preceded by: constituency re-established
- Constituency: Khovrino (No. 207)

Personal details
- Born: 16 August 1964 (age 61) Moscow, RSFSR, USSR
- Party: United Russia
- Education: Moscow State Pedagogical University; RANEPA
- Occupation: Teacher

Irina Viktorovna Belykh (Russian: Ирина Викторовна Белых; born 16 August 1964) is a Russian politician. Chairman of the State Duma Russia committee of the on education from 17 September 2024.

She has been the member of the State Duma for the Khovrino constituency since 2016.

== Education ==
She graduated from the Sholokhov Moscow State University for Humanities and Synergy University.

== Legislative Activity ==
From 2011 to 2022, during her tenure as a deputy of the 6th, 7th, and 8th convocations of the State Duma, she co-authored 95 legislative initiatives and amendments to draft federal laws.

On February 7, 2020, she submitted to the State Duma draft law No. 896438-7 "On conducting an experiment to establish special regulation in order to create the necessary conditions for the development and implementation of artificial intelligence technologies in a constituent entity of the Russian Federation — the federal city of Moscow, and on amending Articles 6 and 10 of the Federal Law 'On Personal Data'".

The deputy authored a bill equating meetings between deputies and constituents with the holding of public events. During the 7th convocation of the State Duma, she introduced and supported draft laws aligned with the interests of the Moscow city government: the renovation law, the law on the international medical cluster (No. 558199-6), and the law on the integrated development of industrial zones (No. 778655-6). According to media reports, Belykh was lobbied into the State Duma by the Moscow government, in particular by Deputy Mayor Anastasia Rakova. According to Transparency International’s 2019 ranking, she was among the top ten lobbyists in the State Duma.

On September 27, 2018, she voted in favor of the pension reform bill (No. 489161-7).

On 19 September 2021, she was elected a deputy of the State Duma of the VIII convocation from single-mandate constituency No. 207.[9] During the election campaign, she was actively supported by the Moscow authorities and was part of Moscow Mayor Sergey Sobyanin’s “team,” which headed the Moscow list of United Russia in the elections.

On 17 September 2024, she was approved by the State Duma as Chair of the Committee on Education.

== Awards and titles ==
- 2018 - Medal of the Order of Merit for the Fatherland, II degree
- 1993 - Honorary Worker of General Education of the Russian Federation
- Academician of the Russian Municipal Academy
