= Konstantin Borovoi =

Russian politician

- Константин Боровой
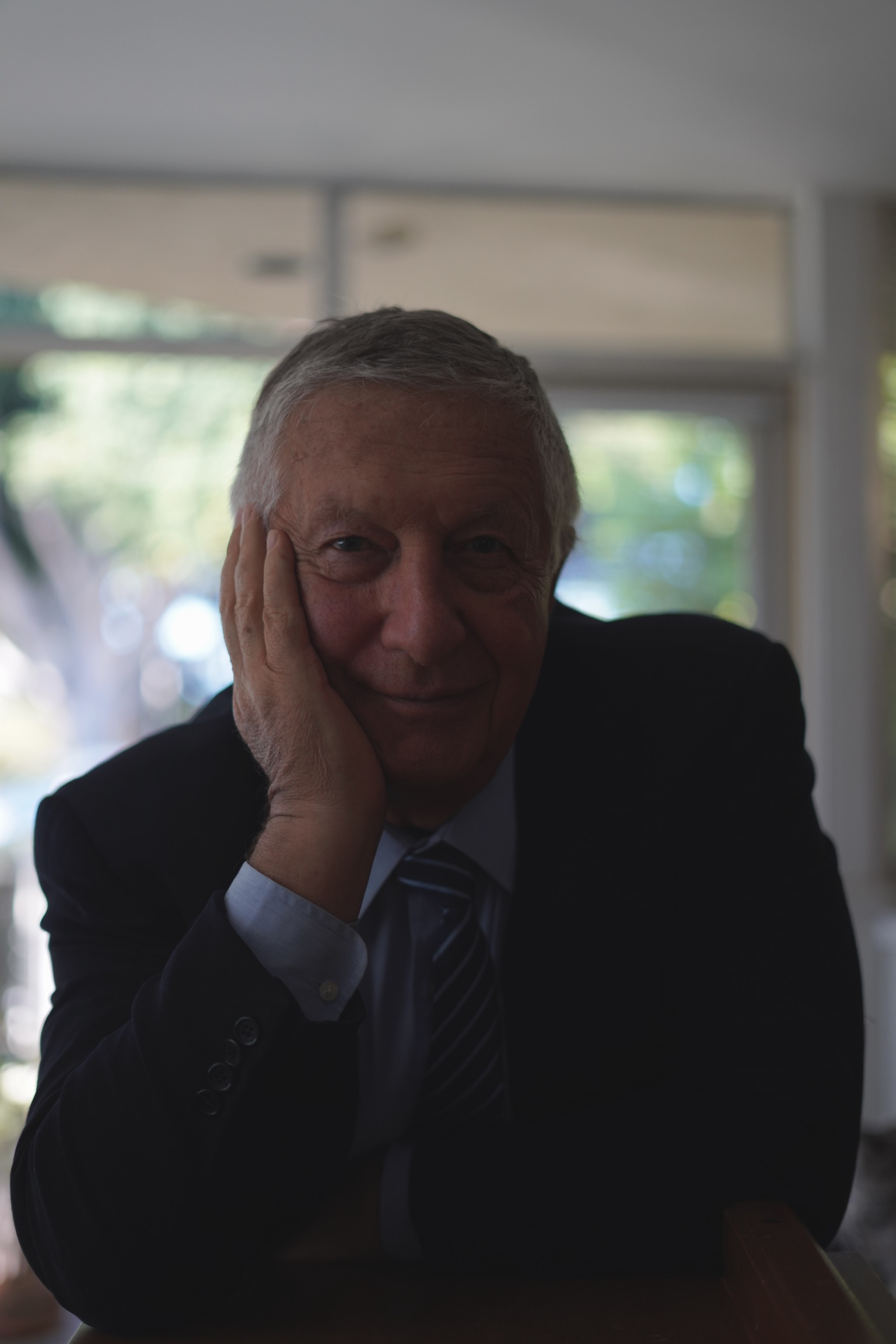
- Borovoi in 2023

Chairman of the Western Choice
- In office 17 March 2013 – 1 August 2014
- Preceded by: Office established
- Succeeded by: Office abolished

Chairman of the Party of Economic Freedom
- In office 14 May 1992 – 17 December 2003
- Preceded by: Office established
- Succeeded by: Office abolished

Member of the State Duma
- In office 17 January 1996 – 24 December 1999
- Preceded by: Yury Vlasov
- Succeeded by: Alexander Shokhin
- Constituency: Tushino

Personal details
- Born: 30 June 1948 (age 78) Moscow, Russian SFSR, Soviet Union
- Party: Party of Economic Freedom (1992–2003); Western Choice (2013–2014)
- Education: Moscow State University
- Occupation: Politician, entrepreneur

Konstantin Natanovich Borovoi (Russian: Константи́н Ната́нович Борово́й; born 30 June 1948) is a liberal Russian politician and entrepreneur, Russian Parliament Member (1995–2000), former Chairman of the Party of Economic Freedom (1992–2003), and former Chairman of the Western Choice (2013–2014).

== Biography ==
Borovoi was born in 1948 in Moscow and is the son of a math professor. He is a graduate of Moscow State University Faculty of Mechanics and Mathematics (1974). In 1990, he founded the first Russian commodities market, and was its president from 1990 to 1992. He also opened the first clearing bank, an investment company and the first business-news wire. He was a financial director of Russia's Open Film Festival.

In 1992, he created an Economic Freedom Party (Russian: Партия экономической свободы (ПЭС), Partiya Ekonomicheskoi svobody). The party ran in the 1995 parliamentary elections, but received 0.13% of the proportional representation vote, failing to cross the electoral threshold. However, it did win a constituency seat in the State Duma, taken by Borovoi. The party was deregistered in 2003.

In April 1996, he was speaking with the President of the Chechen Republic of Ichkeria, Dzhokhar Dudayev by phone when Dudayev was assassinated by two laser-guided missiles, after his location was detected by a Russian reconnaissance aircraft, which intercepted his phone call.

Up until December 1999, Borovoi was a member of the State Duma, representing the Tushino constituency.

In the spring of 2013, together with Valeriya Novodvorskaya, he created a liberal political party, Western Choice. On 17 March, he was elected its president.

In 2019, Borovoi fled to the United States after learning that there were plans to assassinate him.

== Political activism ==
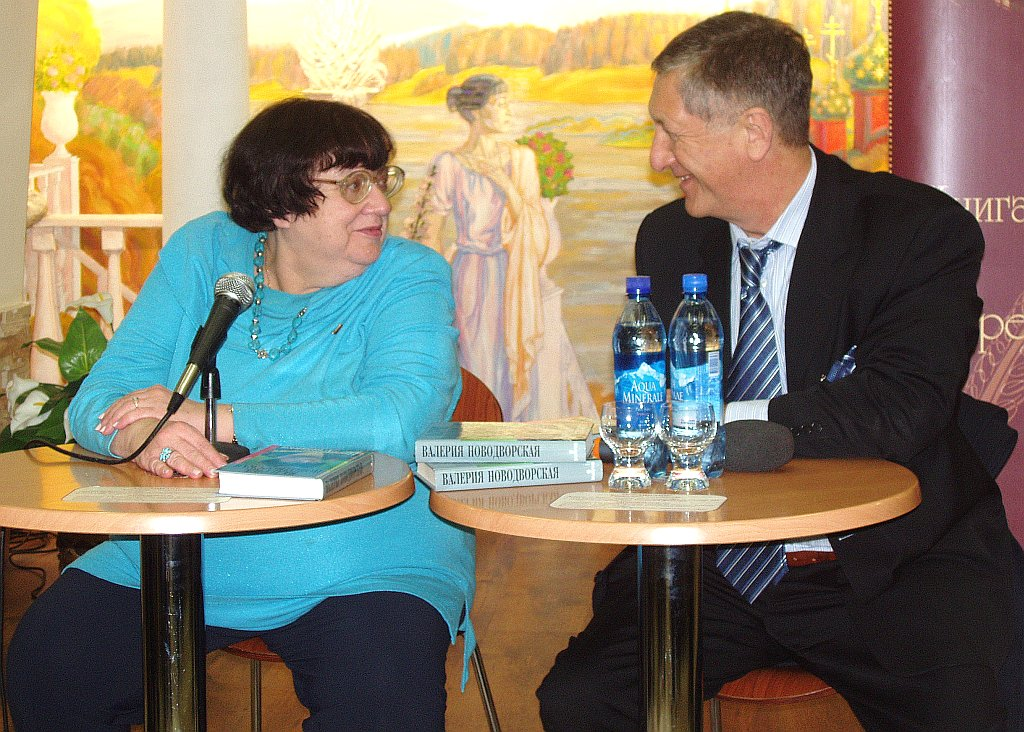
Borovoi with Valeriya Novodvorskaya in 2009

Borovoi self-identifies primarily as a liberal politician. In 1991, he participated in the resistance to the Communist Coup d'État in Russia State Committee on the State of Emergency (GKChP). On 20 August 1991, he and the 2,000 members of his stock exchange carried a huge flag of Russia to the White House, Russia's parliament building. From 2001 to 2004 Editor-in-Chief of America Magazine. In the spring of 2010, he was among the 34 first signatories of the online anti-Putin campaign "Putin Must Go" (Путин должен уйти). The campaign was begun by a coalition of opposition to Putin who regard his rule as lacking any rule of law. Together with Valeriya Novodvorskaya, he made video clips which he published on Live Journal, Facebook and YouTube. In 2012, he created a campaign called "Russia without Hitler". In 2016, he created the Valeriya Novodvorskaya Foundation.

== Bibliography ==
- Konstantin Borovoi, The Price of Freedom. M.: Novosti, 1993. 240 pages, 100 000 copies. ISBN 5-7020-0829-4 (in Russian)
- Konstantin Borovoi, Twelve Most Successful. How to Become Rich. M.: Vagrius, 2003. 224 pages. ISBN 5-264-00881-7 (in Russian)
- Konstantin Borovoi, Prostitution in Russia. Report from the bottom of Moscow. M.: Vagrius, 2007. 272 pages. ISBN 978-5-9697-0405-3, ISBN 978-5-9697-0393-3 (in Russian)
