= Severnoye Tushino District =

Severnoye Tushino District Северное Тушино (Russian)
- District
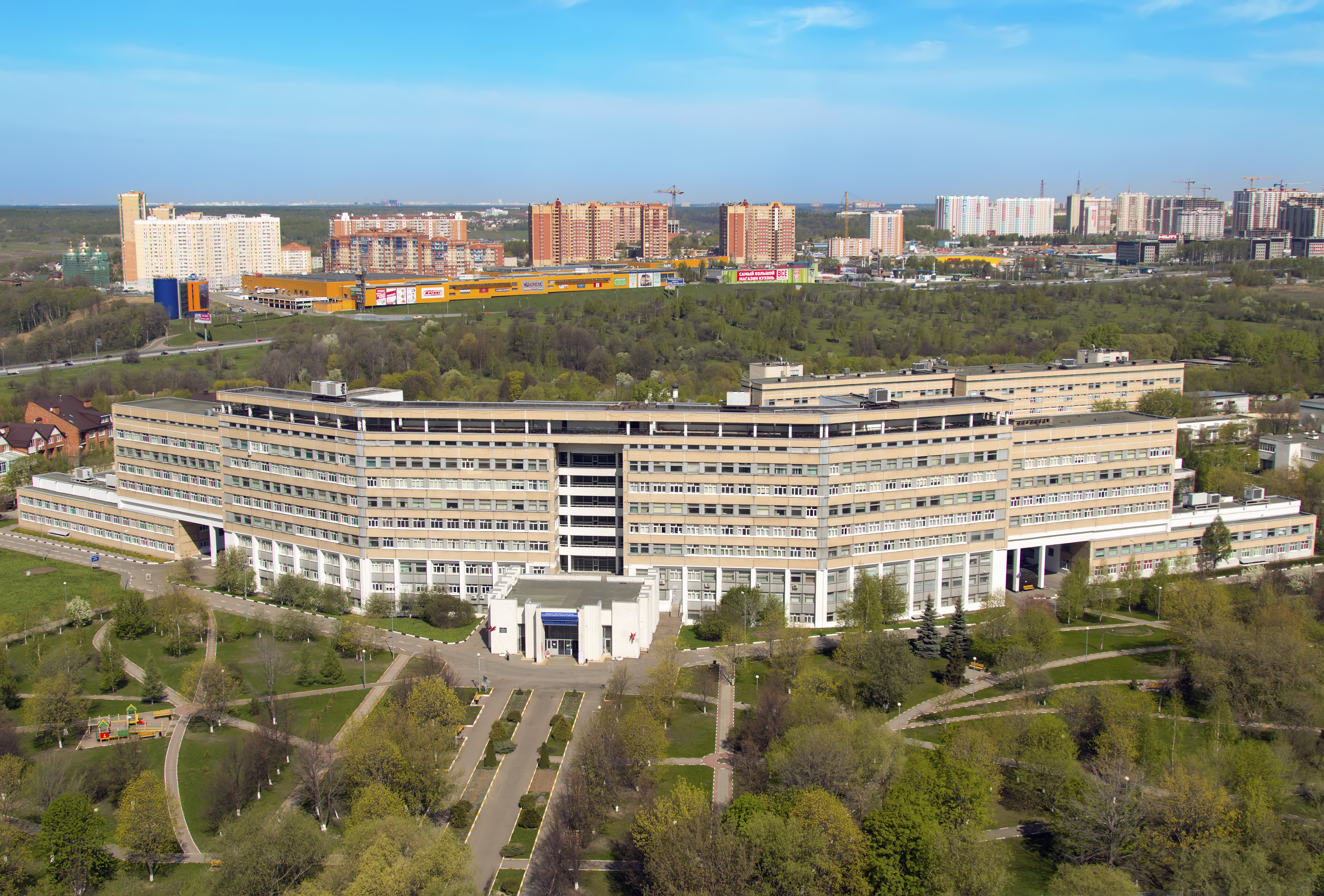
- Moscow Tushino Children Hospital, Severnoye Tushino District

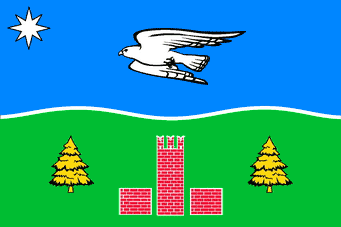
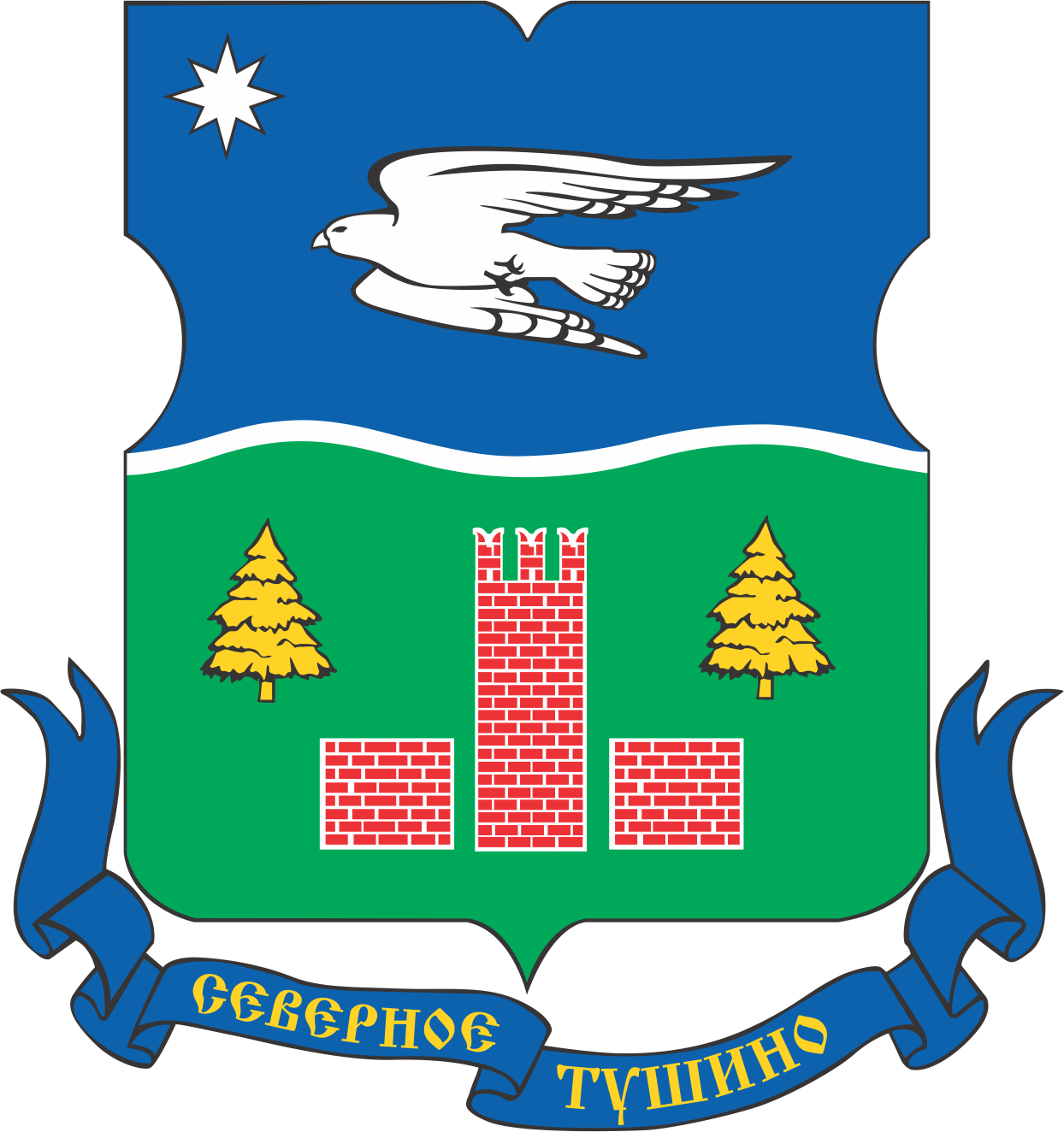
- Flag Coat of arms
- Location of Severnoye Tushino District on the map of Moscow
- Coordinates: 55°51′31″N 37°26′47″E
- Country: Russia
- Federal subject: Moscow
- Time zone: UTC+
- OKTMO ID: 45369000
- Website: http://severnoe-tushino.mos.ru/

Severnoye Tushino District or Northern Tushino (Russian: райо́н Северное Тушино) is an administrative district (raion) of North-Western Administrative Okrug, and one of the 125 raions of Moscow, Russia. In the district there are Alyoshkinsky forest and Severnoye Tushino park.

== Location ==
The neighborhood is in the northern part of North-Western Administrative Okrug. On the South it borders on Yuzhnoye Tushino. The southern border consists of the Khimkinsky and Yana Raynisa boulevards that continue into Salomei Neris Street. On the East it borders on Levoberezhny District. There is Khimka reservoir, also known as the Moscow Canal.

== History ==
=== Social Situation ===
Despite the high alcohol and drug abuse, the neighborhood is considered to be highly desirable due to its proximity to parks, beaches and solid housing and transportation infrastructure. Within the last 20 years the neighborhood has been through a revival due to an influx of immigrants from former Soviet states like Armenia, Georgia, Uzbekistan, etc.

== See also ==
- Administrative divisions of Moscow
