= Zapadnoye Degunino District =

- District
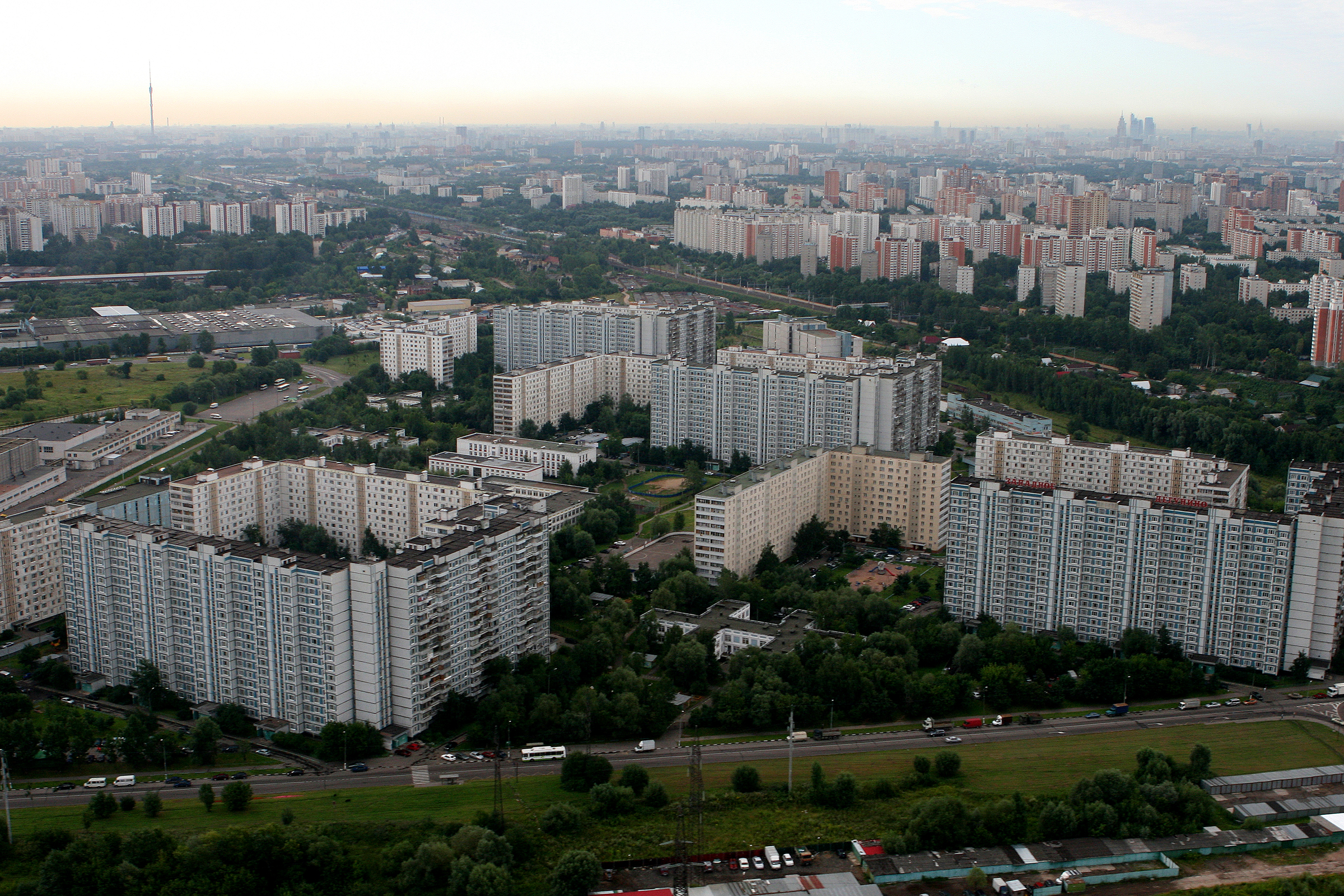
- Businivo, Zapadnoye Degunino District, Moscow

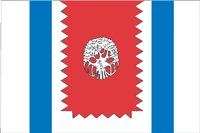
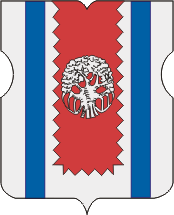
- Flag Coat of arms
- Location of Zapadnoye Degunino District on the map of Moscow
- Coordinates: 55°51′55″N 37°32′12″E
- Country: Russia
- Federal subject: Moscow

Area
  - Total: 7.5266 km^{2} (2.9060 sq mi)
- Time zone: UTC+
- OKTMO ID: 45340000
- Website: https://zap-degunino.mos.ru/

Zapadnoye Degunino District (Russian: Западное Дегунино – Western Degunino) is an administrative district (raion) of Northern Administrative Okrug, and one of the 125 raions of Moscow, Russia. The area of the district is 7.5266 square kilometers (2.9060 sq mi). In 1997 the Businovo District was merged into the district.

== See also ==
- Administrative divisions of Moscow
