= Kurkino (inhabited locality) =

Kurkino (Russian: Куркино) is the name of several inhabited localities in Russia.

Urban localities

- Kurkino, Tula Oblast, an urban-type settlement in Kurkinsky District of Tula Oblast

Rural localities

- Kurkino, Kaluga Oblast, a village in Yukhnovsky District of Kaluga Oblast
- Kurkino, Krasnoyarsk Krai, a village in Cheremushinsky Selsoviet of Karatuzsky District of Krasnoyarsk Krai
- Kurkino, Kursk Oblast, a selo in Kamyshinsky Selsoviet of Kursky District of Kursk Oblast
- Kurkino, Moscow Oblast, a village in Seredinskoye Rural Settlement of Shakhovskoy District of Moscow Oblast
- Kurkino, Pskov Oblast, a village in Kunyinsky District of Pskov Oblast
- Kurkino, Ryazan Oblast, a village in Iskrovsky Rural Okrug of Ryazansky District of Ryazan Oblast
- Kurkino, Smolensk Oblast, a village in Novoduginskoye Rural Settlement of Novoduginsky District of Smolensk Oblast
- Kurkino, Republic of Tatarstan, a village in Kukmorsky District of the Republic of Tatarstan
- Kurkino, Tver Oblast, a village in Kalininsky District of Tver Oblast
- Kurkino, Nefedovsky Selsoviet, Vologodsky District, Vologda Oblast, a village in Nefedovsky Selsoviet of Vologodsky District of Vologda Oblast
- Kurkino, Oktyabrsky Selsoviet, Vologodsky District, Vologda Oblast, a selo in Oktyabrsky Selsoviet of Vologodsky District of Vologda Oblast
