= Igor Vittel =

Russian journalist and TV personality (born 1968)

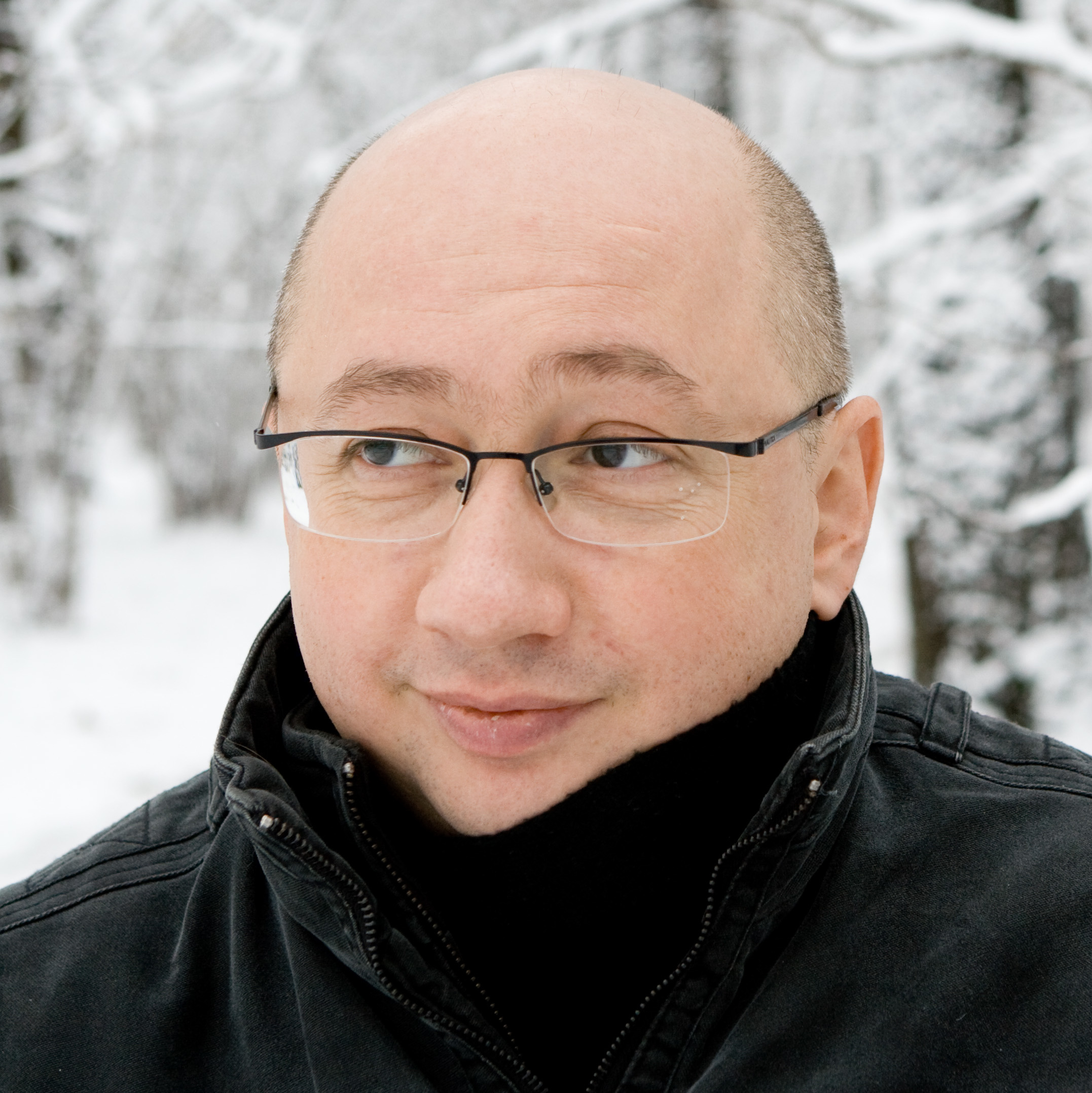
- Born: 1968 (age 57–58); Moscow, Russia
- Occupations: journalist, politician

Igor Stanislavovich Vittel is a Russian journalist and TV personality most known for his continuous work at Russian "business TV" channel RBC TV. He is also known as an expert guest at numerous political talk shows on major Russian TV channels such as Channel 1. He is systematically involved in other creative and political activities.

== Biography ==
Vittel was born in Moscow (USSR) in 1968, in an artistic family. He graduated at an aviation college to become a specialist in the life support of crewed spacecraft. Later he also received additional education in economics and journalism. Vittel first appeared on TV in 1991. He has worked at a number of Russian and foreign mass-media outlets, both aired and printed and worked as a producer for several documentary movies. For many years, Vittel lived outside Russia, particularly in the United States.

== Journalism ==
His main role is the RBC TV host—for over 14 years in programs with many names. The main format is the author's talk show where about 2 to 4 guests are invited to discuss current political and economical issues. He also hosted similar programs on radio — at Russian stations such as Business FM, Russian News Service and Finam FM. More over, Vittel regularly publishes articles at newspapers and news websites: such as AiF, Polit.ru, Pravda.ru, GQ, Lenta.ru and others.

As a guest political and economical expert, Vittel regularly appears at talk shows at TV channels such as Channel 1, Russia TV and TVC. He holds awards for journalistic achievements from tourism, marketing and energetic industries.

During the 2022 Russian invasion of Ukraine, he claimed that Ukraine was provoking Russian to attack, and that the Ukrainian president Volodymyr Zelenskyy was planning to let Ukrainian forces hit Ukraine in order to blame it on Russia.

== Political and other activities ==
Igor Vittel is a member of several social and political associations and unions such as Union of Journalists of Russia, National Anti-Corruption Committee, Russian Jewish Congress and others.

He also lectures in London School of Public Relations, Maimonides State Classic Academy and Russian Presidential Academy of National Economy and Public Administration.

Back in the 1980s, Vittel acted as music producer and was producing such musicians as Alexander Bashlachev, Yuri Naumov and Vostochny Syndrom band.

He produced two documentary movies: on Chechen war («На мне крови нет», 2011) and narcotics problematics («Дневник наркоманки», 2013). He also acted as producer at several Internet and media projects, involved in different types of consulting, etc. He plans to publish a book on modern Russian economic history.

In 2016 he run for State Duma of Russia at federal elections but lost to Gennady Onishchenko.
