= Molzhaninovsky District =

Molzhaninovsky District Молжаниновский район (Russian)
- District
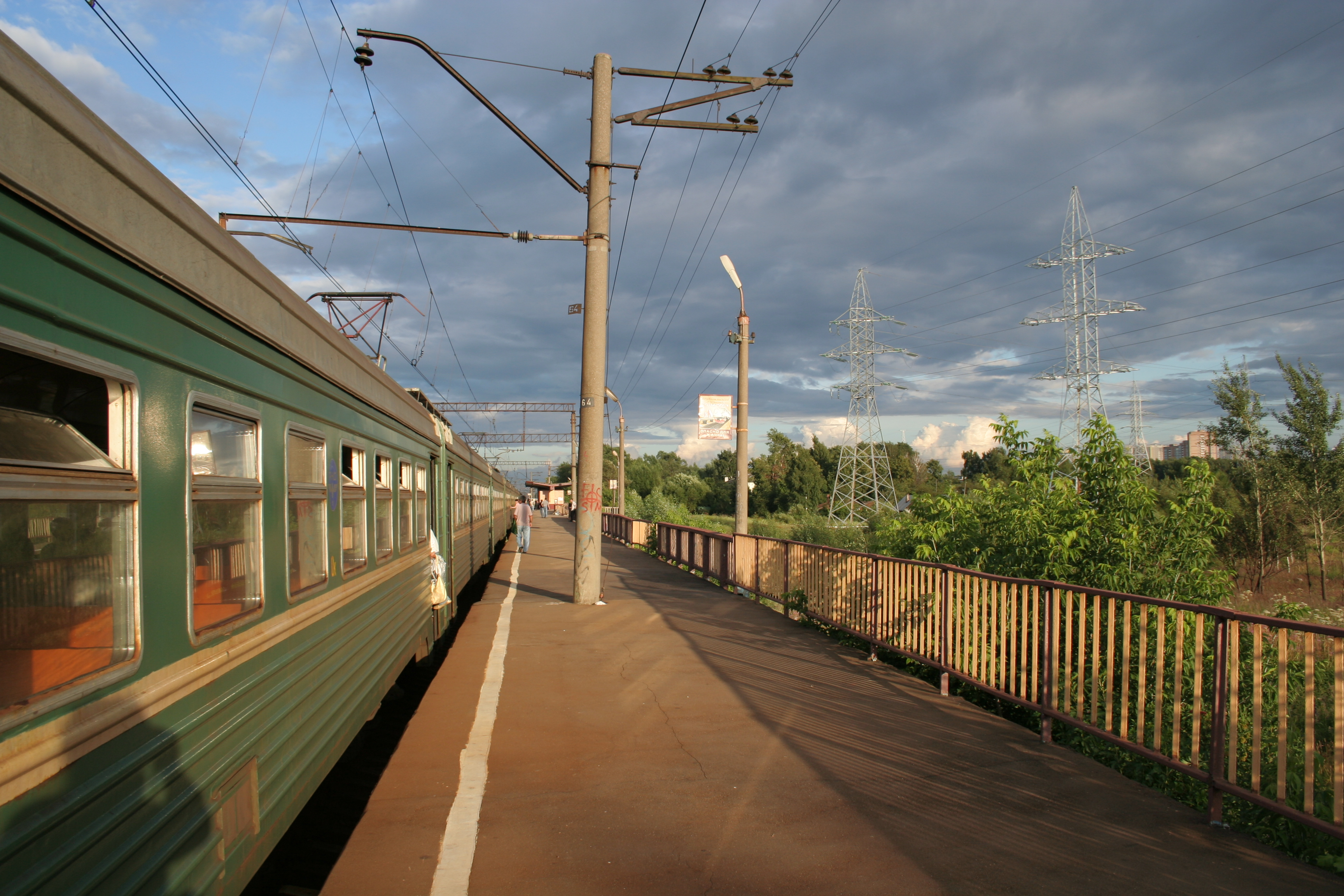
- Planernaya Rail Station, Molzhaninovsky District

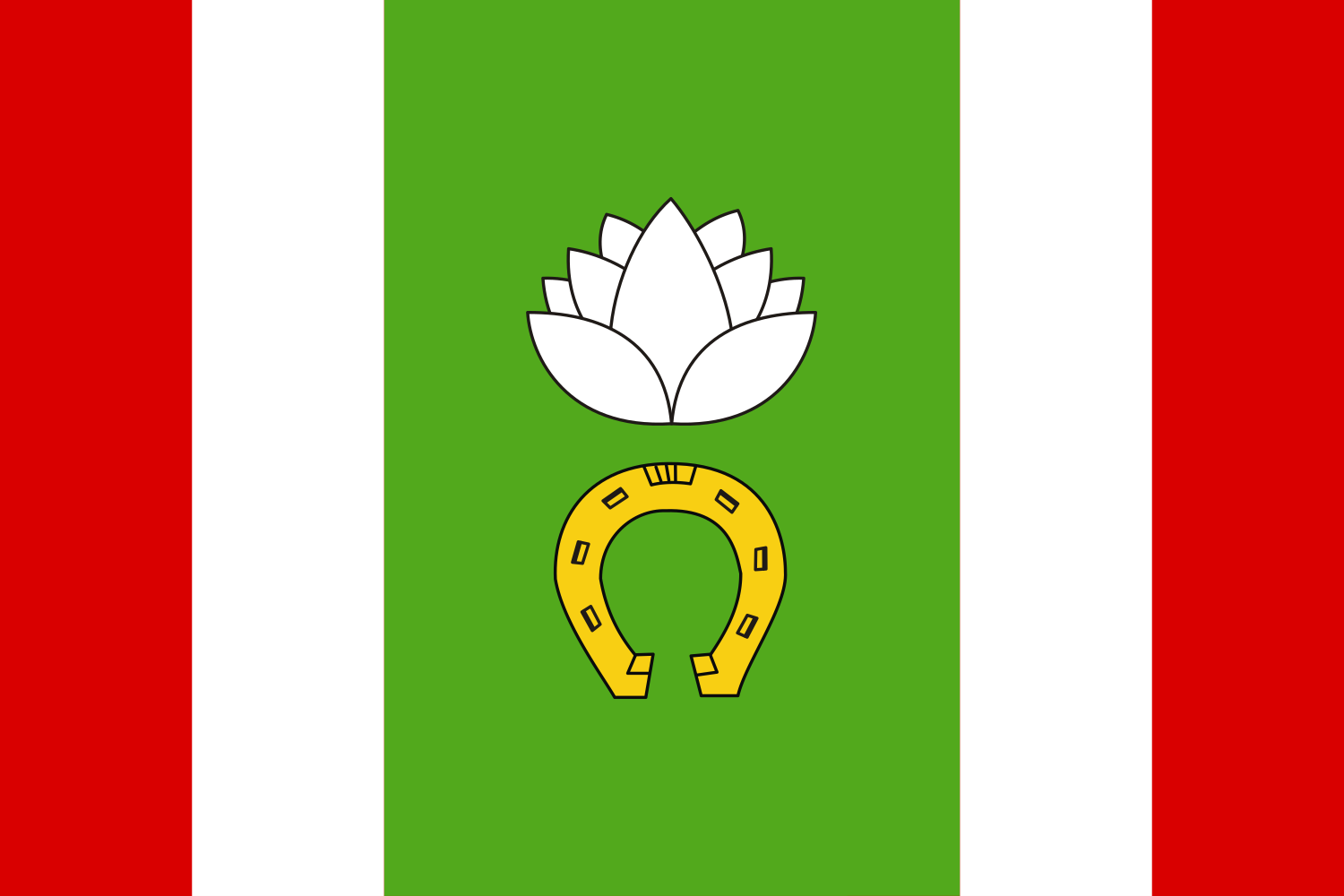
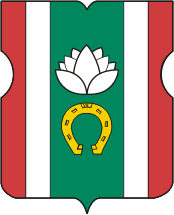
- Flag Coat of arms
- Location of Molzhaninovsky District in Moscow (pre-2012 map)
- Coordinates: 55°55′51″N 37°23′21″E
- Country: Russia
- Federal subject: federal city of Moscow

Area
  - Total: 16.65 km^{2} (6.43 sq mi)

Population (2010 Census)
  - Total: 3,521
  - Density: 211.5/km^{2} (547.7/sq mi)

Municipal structure
  - Municipally incorporated as: Molzhaninovsky Municipal Okrug
- Time zone: UTC+
- OKTMO ID: 45343000
- Website: https://molzhaninovskiy.mos.ru/

Population of Molzhaninovsky District
- 2010 Census: 3,521
- 2002 Census: 2,928

Molzhaninovsky District (Russian: Молжани́новский райо́н) is an administrative district (raion), one of the sixteen in Northern Administrative Okrug of the federal city of Moscow, Russia. The area of the district is 16.65 square kilometres (6.43 mi^{2}) As of the 2010 Census, the total population of the district was 3,521.

== Municipal status ==
As a municipal division, it is incorporated as Molzhaninovsky Municipal Okrug.
