= Golovinsky District =

Golovinsky District Головинский район (Russian)
- District
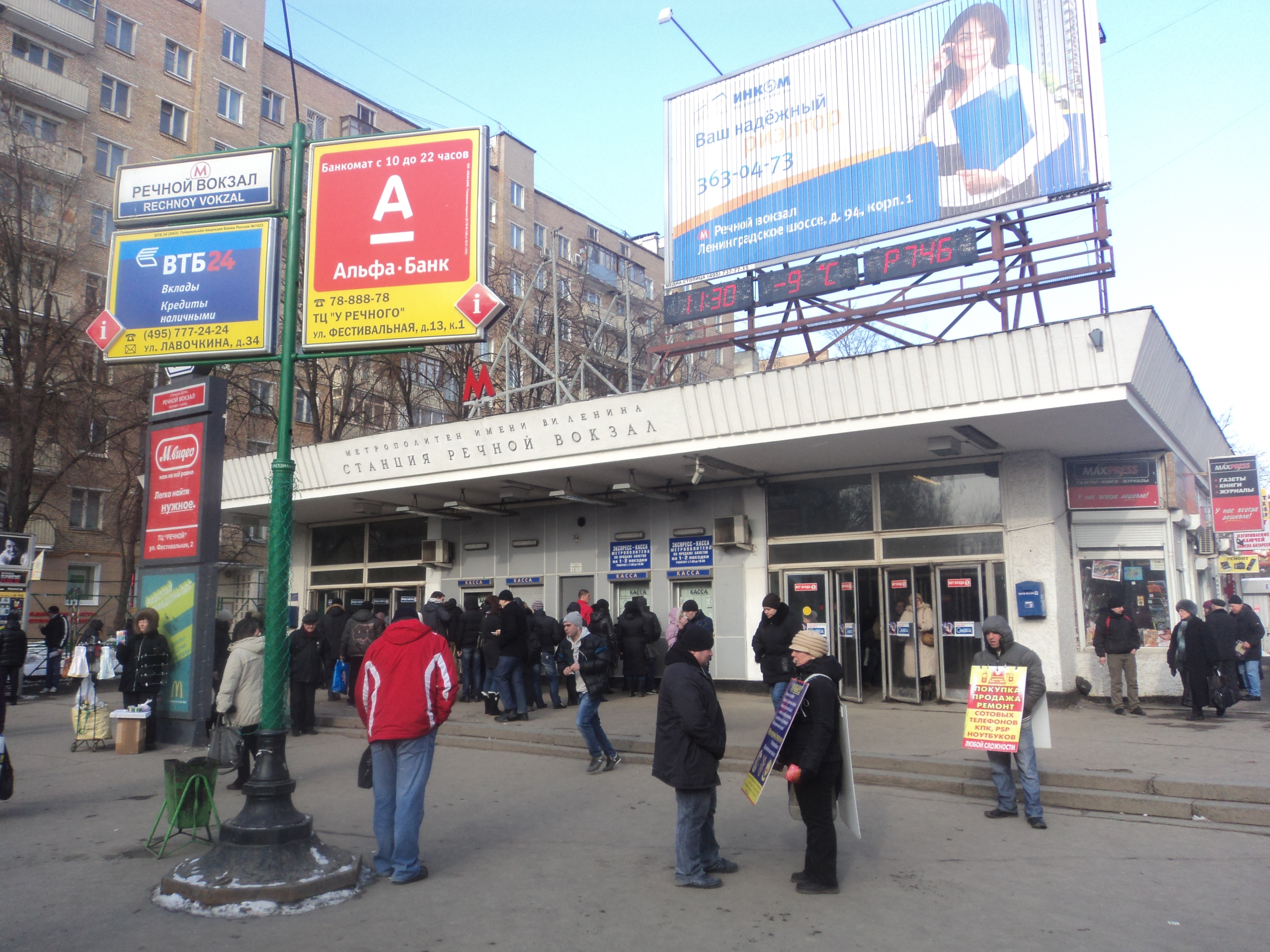
- Metro station entrance, Golovinsky District

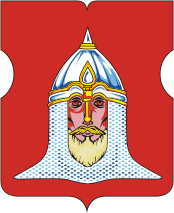
- Flag Coat of arms
- Location of Golovinsky District on the map of Moscow
- Coordinates: 55°50′45″N 37°31′01″E
- Country: Russia
- Federal subject: Moscow

Area
  - Total: 8.806 km^{2} (3.400 sq mi)
- Time zone: UTC+
- OKTMO ID: 45338000
- Website: https://golovinskiy.mos.ru/

Golovinsky District (Russian: Головинский райо́н) is an administrative district (raion) of Northern Administrative Okrug, and one of the 125 raions of Moscow, Russia. The area of the district is 8.806 square kilometers (3.400 sq mi). According to a 2018 estimate, the population of the district is 103,148.

== See also ==
- Administrative divisions of Moscow
