= Levoberezhny District, Moscow =

Levoberezhny District Левобережный район (Russian)
- District
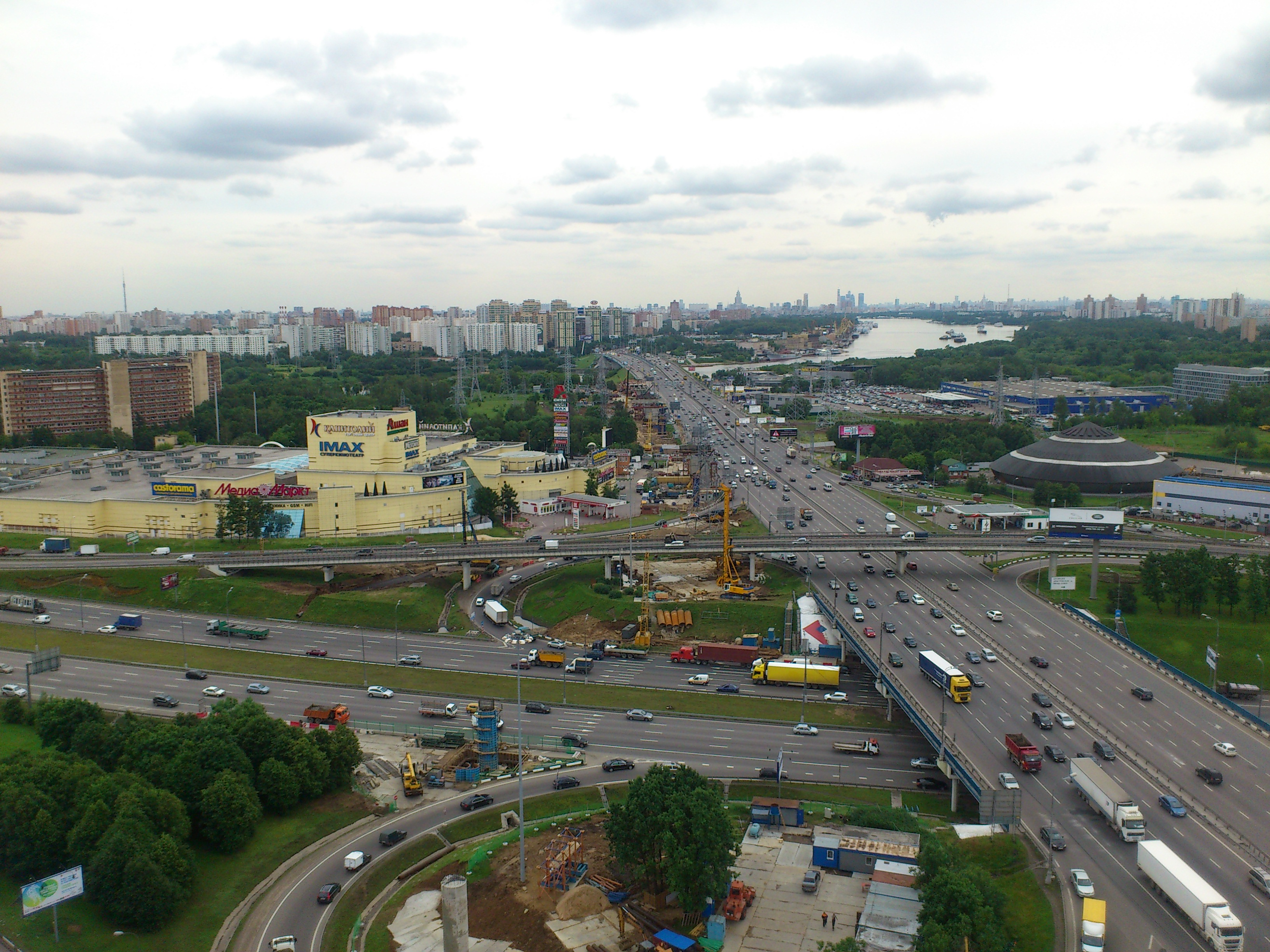
- View of Levoberezhny District

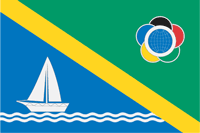
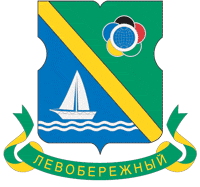
- Flag Coat of arms
- Location of Levoberezhny District in Moscow
- Coordinates: 55°52′N 37°28′E
- Country: Russia
- Federal subject: federal city of Moscow

Area
  - Total: 8 km^{2} (3.1 sq mi)

Population (2010 Census)
  - Total: 51,457
  - Density: 6,400/km^{2} (17,000/sq mi)

Municipal structure
  - Municipally incorporated as: Levoberezhny Municipal Okrug
- Time zone: UTC+
- OKTMO ID: 45342000
- Website: http://levoberezhny.mos.ru

Population of Levoberezhny District
- 2010 Census: 51,457
- 2002 Census: 51,309

Levoberezhny District (Russian: Левобере́жный райо́н) is an administrative district (raion), one of the sixteen in Northern Administrative Okrug of the federal city of Moscow, Russia. The area of the district is 8 square kilometres (3.1 mi^{2}). As of the 2010 Census, the total population of the district was 51,457.

== Municipal status ==
As a municipal division, it is incorporated as Levoberezhny Municipal Okrug.
