= Party of Economic Freedom =

Party of Economic Freedom Партия экономической свободы
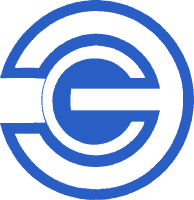
- Abbreviation: PEF (English); ПЭС (Russian)
- Leader: Konstantin Borovoi
- Founded: 14 May 1992
- Registered: 25 June 1992
- Dissolved: 17 December 2003
- Merged into: Union of Right Forces
- Headquarters: 11th building, Vtoroy Kolobovskiy Lane; Moscow, Moscow Oblast, Russia 105066
- Ideology: Liberalism; Neoconservatism; Economic liberalism
- Political position: Centre-right
- Colours: Blue
- Slogan: "Freedom, democracy, market" (Russian: "Свобода, демократия, рынок")

The Party of Economic Freedom (Russian: Партия экономической свободы, Partiya Ekonomicheskoi svobody) was a political party in Russia led by Konstantin Borovoi.

== History ==
The party was established in May 1992. It joined the "August" bloc for the 1993 parliamentary elections, but the bloc failed to obtain the 100,000 signatures necessary to get on the ballot. However, two party members, Irina Khakamada and Leonid Nekrasov, were elected after running as independents.

The party did manage to run in the 1995 parliamentary elections, but received 0.13% of the proportional representation vote, failing to cross the electoral threshold. However, it did win a single constituency seat in the State Duma, taken by Borovoy. Prior to the 1999 parliamentary elections the party was in negotiations to become part of the Union of Right Forces alliance, which it eventually joined. The Union won 29 of the 450 seats.

The party was deregistered in January 2003, then registered again on 8 February, and finally deregistered on 17 December.
