= Khovrino District =

Khovrino District район Ховрино (Russian)
- District
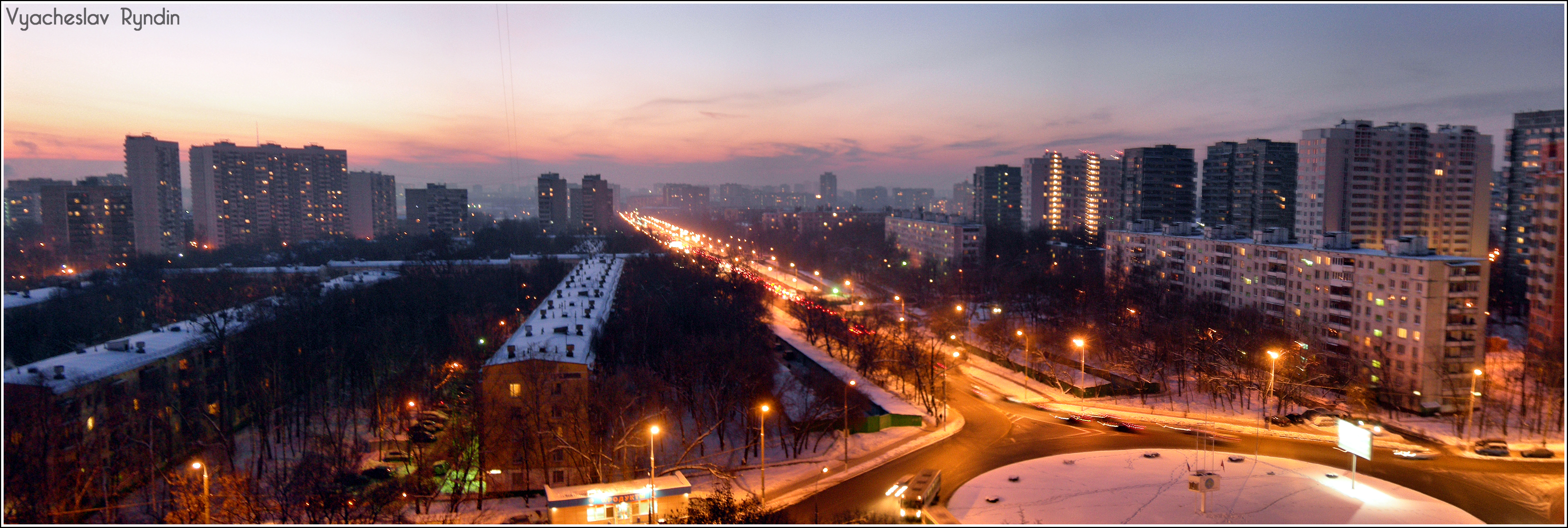
- Petrozavodskaya Street in Khovrino District

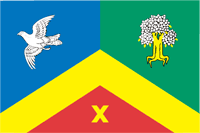
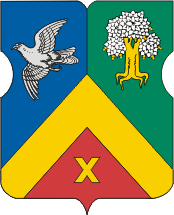
- Flag Coat of arms
- Location of Khovrino District in Moscow (pre-2012 map)
- Coordinates: 55°52′20″N 37°30′17″E
- Country: Russia
- Federal subject: federal city of Moscow

Area
  - Total: 5.727 km^{2} (2.211 sq mi)

Population (2010 Census)
  - Total: 80,792
  - Density: 14,110/km^{2} (36,540/sq mi)

Municipal structure
  - Municipally incorporated as: Khovrino Municipal Okrug
- Time zone: UTC+
- OKTMO ID: 45347000
- Website: http://khovrino.mos.ru/

Population of Khovrino District
- 2010 Census: 80,792
- 2002 Census: 79,092

Khovrino District (Russian: райо́н Хо́врино) is an administrative district (raion), one of the sixteen in Northern Administrative Okrug of the federal city of Moscow, Russia. It is located along the Likhoborka River. The area is 5.727 square kilometres (2.211 mi^{2}) As of the 2010 Census, the total population of the district was 80,792.

== History ==
The name of the district comes from that of a former village, known since the 15th century as an estate of a Surozh prince Stefan Gabras nicknamed "Khovra" (hence the name). In the late 19th century, Khovrino was owned by the Grachyov family of manufacturers. In 1960, Khovrino was engulfed by Moscow.

== Municipal status ==
As a municipal division, it is incorporated as Khovrino Municipal Okrug.

== Landmarks ==
- Hovrinskaya Hospital (1985-2018)
