= Yuzhnoye Tushino District =

- District
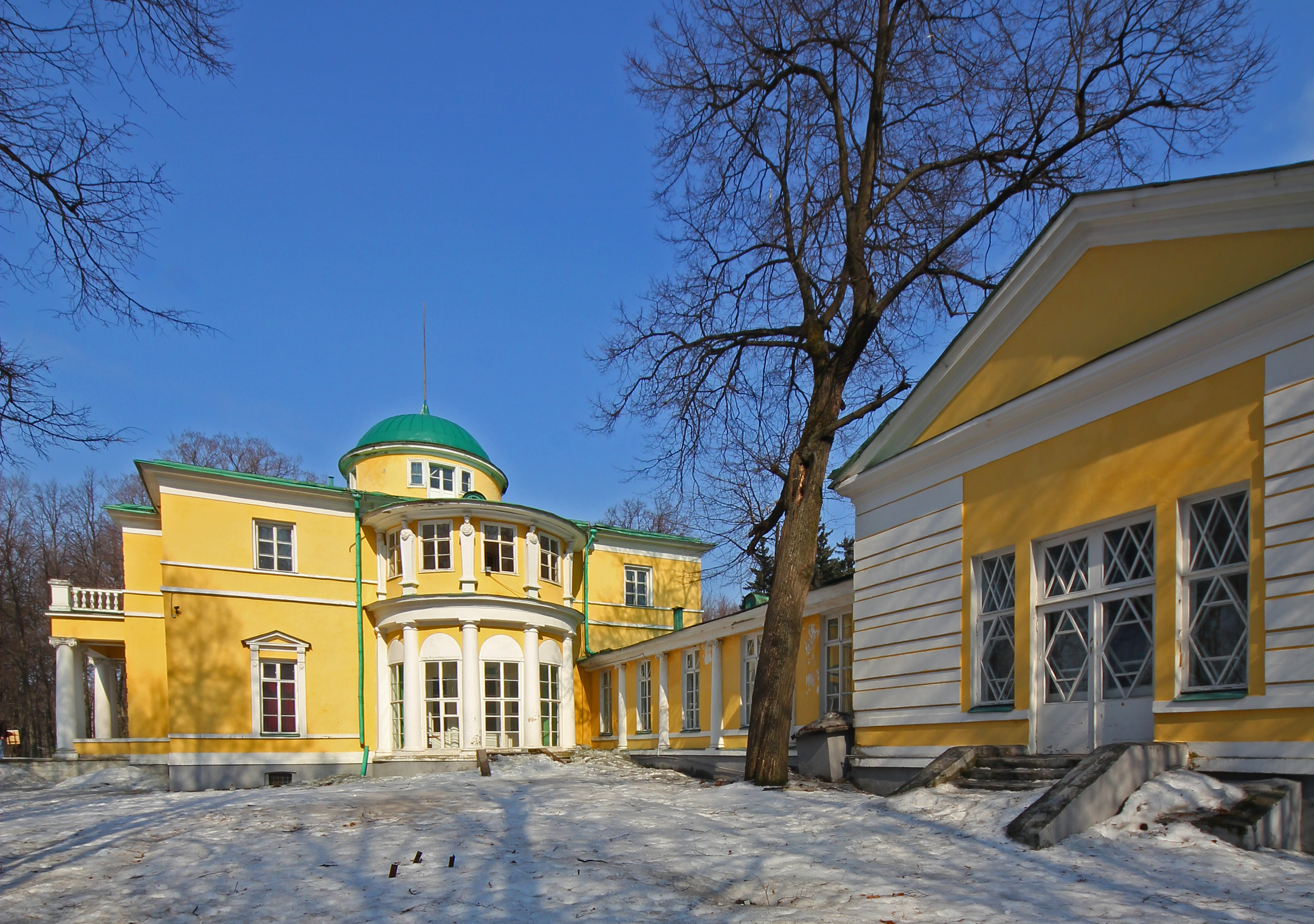
- Former Bratzevo estate, Yuzhnoye Tushino District

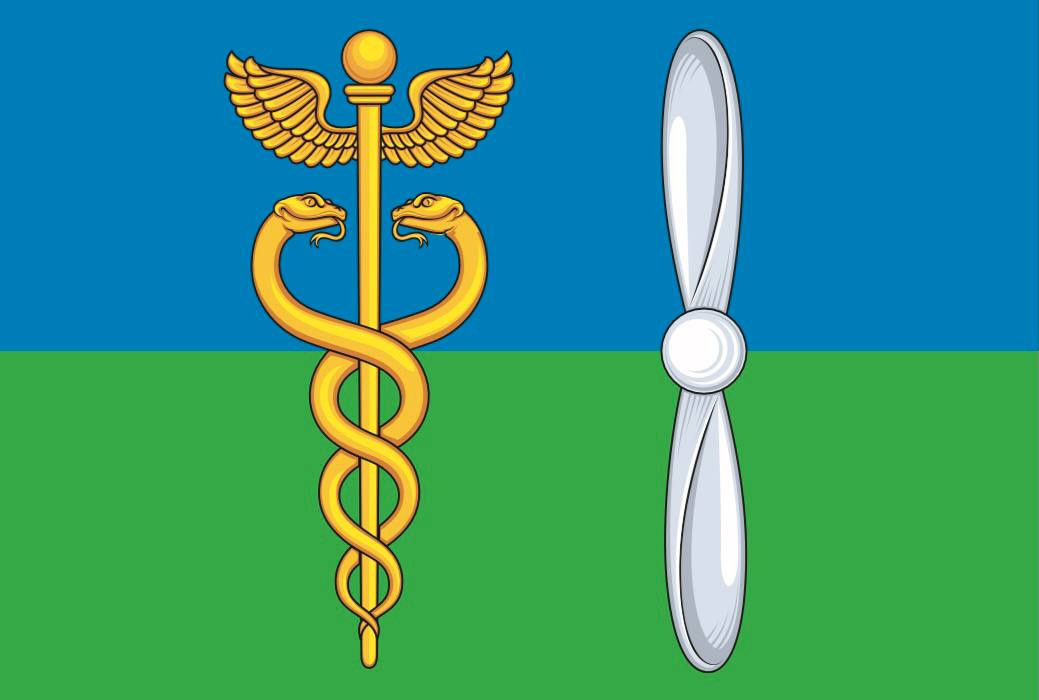
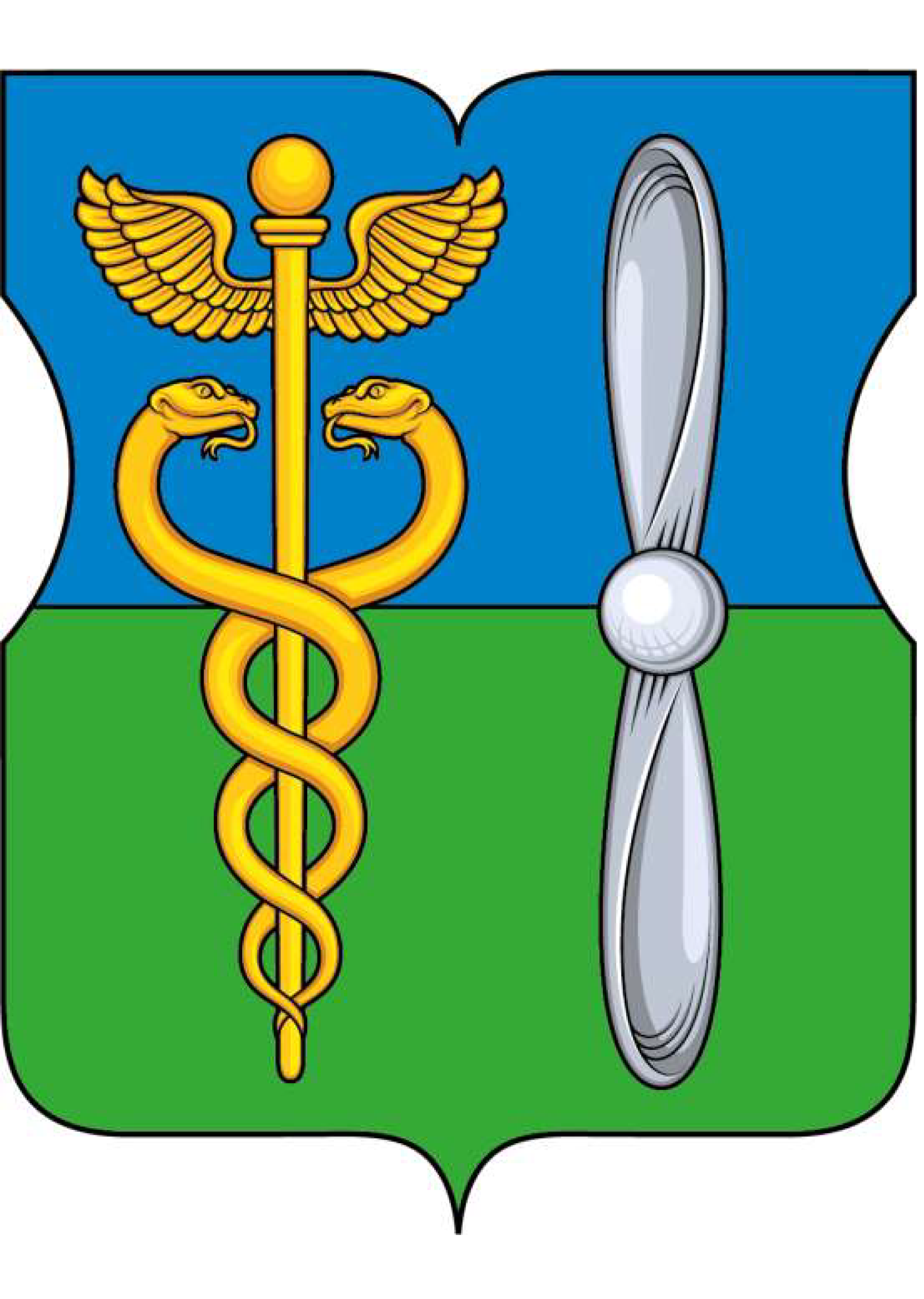
- Flag Coat of arms
- Location of Yuzhnoye Tushino District on the map of Moscow
- Coordinates: 55°50′40″N 37°25′55″E
- Country: Russia
- Federal subject: Moscow
- Time zone: UTC+
- OKTMO ID: 45373000
- Website: http://yutushino.ru/

Yuzhnoye Tushino District (Russian: Южное Тушино райо́н, lit. South Tushino) is an administrative district (raion) of North-Western Administrative Okrug, and one of the 125 raions of Moscow, Russia.

== History ==
Before 1960 district territories was part of Moscow oblast. It had villages Petrovo and Zakharkovo and Bratsevo mansion. The first wave of mass housing in the district began in the 1940-1950s as a part of the extending city Tushino. At that time, it was built along the streets of neighborhoods Skhodnenskaya (Skhodnya), Lodochnaya (Boat) and Okruzhnaya (Circle), but is currently under a mass demolition of these buildings and the construction in their place, modern high-rise buildings. The next wave of construction took place in the 1960-1970s, When neighborhoods were built along the boulevards Yana Raynisa (named after Janis Rajnis) and Khimkinski (after Khimka river, now this boulevard is near Khimkinskoye reservoir), Aerodromnaya (Tushino airfield) and Turistskaya (tourist) streets. In the 1970s, villages Petrovo and Zakharkovo was demolished. In the 1980s, neighborhoods were built along the streets Vasili Petushkova and knitting directions.

== Transport ==
District serves by Skhodnenskaya (Skhodnya, named after the street named after the river) metro station (line) and Trikotazhnaya (Knit, named after the demolished worker settlement) MCD station (line).

== See also ==
- Administrative divisions of Moscow
