= Kurkino District =

Kurkino District район Куркино (Russian)
- District
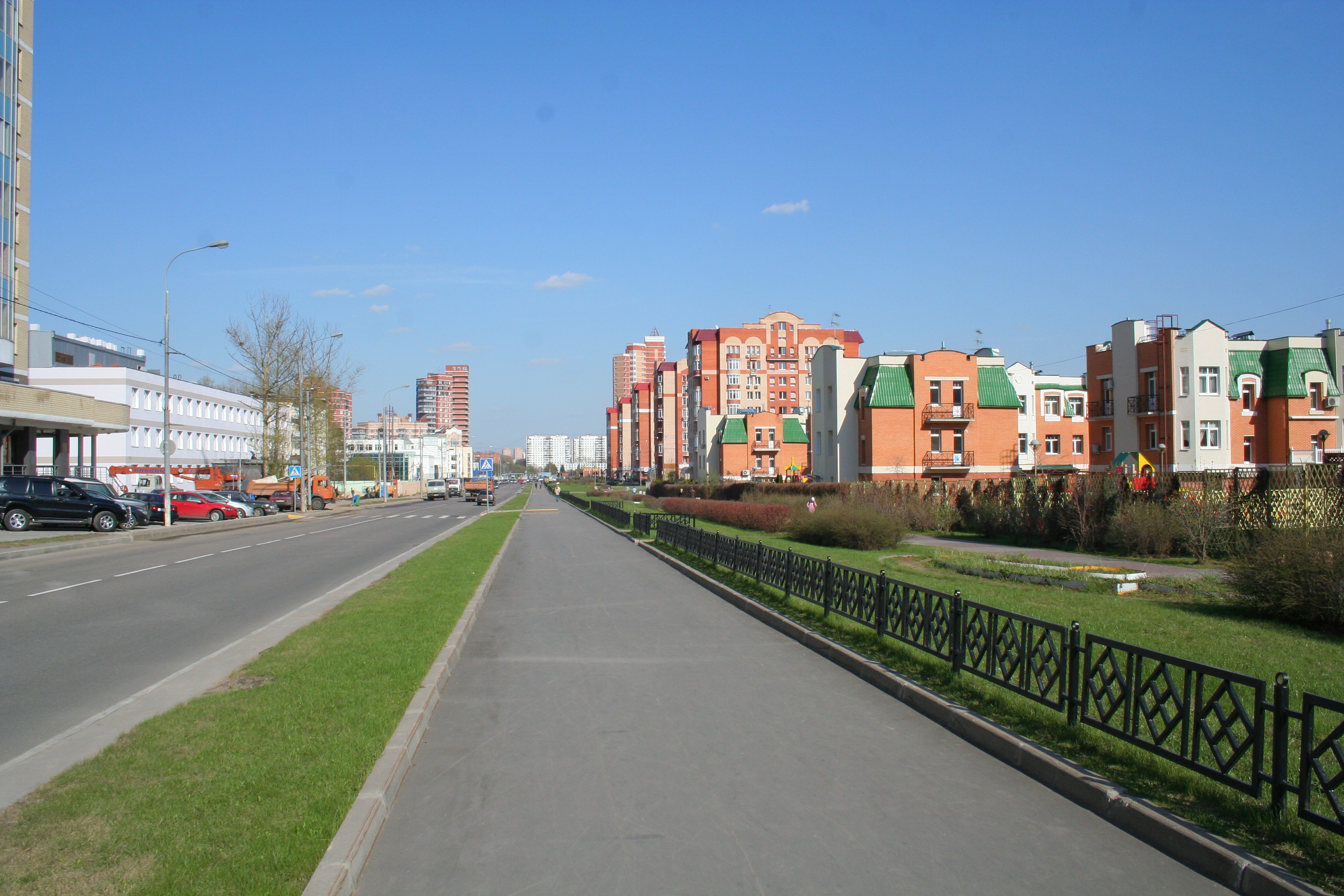
- A street in the Moscow's suburb of Kurkino, built in the 2000s.

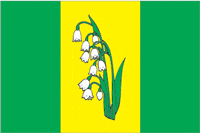
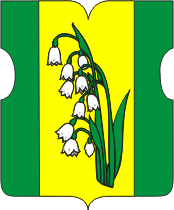
- Flag Coat of arms
- Location of Kurkino District in Moscow
- Coordinates: 55°53′32″N 37°23′19″E
- Country: Russia
- Federal subject: Moscow
- Established: 1992

Area
  - Total: 7.91 km^{2} (3.05 sq mi)

Population (2010 Census)
  - Total: 21,155
  - Estimate (2017): 30,000
  - Density: 2,670/km^{2} (6,930/sq mi)
  - Urban: 100%
  - Rural: 0%
- Time zone: UTC+
- OKTMO ID: 45366000

Kurkino District (Russian: район Куркино) is a district of North-Western Administrative Okrug of the federal city of Moscow, Russia. It is just outside the Moscow Ring Road, 19 km northwest of the center of Moscow. The area of the district is 7.91 square kilometres (3.05 mi^{2}). Population: 30,000 (Est. 2017) 21,314 (2010 census); 2,155 (2002 census).

== Geography ==
The neighborhood is located out of MKAD, on the northwest of Moscow. It borders the city of Khimki.

== History ==
The district was established in 1992.
