= Leningradsky constituency =

Russian legislative constituency

Leningradsky single-member constituency
- Constituency of the Russian State Duma
- Deputy: Eldar Sharipov; United Russia
- Federal subject: Moscow
- Districts: Northern AO (Aeroport, Begovoy, Beskudnikovsky, Dmitrovsky, Khoroshyovsky, Koptevo, Savyolovsky, Timiryazevsky, Vostochnoye Degunino, Zapadnoye Degunino)
- Voters: 523,041 (2026)

The Leningradsky constituency (No.197 (Note: Northern constituency No.199 in 1993-1995, No.194 in 1995-2007, No.198 in 2016–2026)) is a Russian legislative constituency in Moscow. The constituency covers inner and outer eastern parts of Northern Moscow.

The constituency has been represented since 2026 by United Russia deputy Eldar Sharipov, former municipal deputy and retired Russian Army captain, who defeated five-term A Just Russia incumbent Galina Khovanskaya.

== Boundaries ==
1993–1995 Northern constituency: Northern Administrative Okrug (Aeroport District, Begovoy District, Golovinsky District, Khoroshyovsky District, Koptevo District, Savyolovsky District, Sokol District, Timiryazevsky District, Voykovsky District)
The constituency covered inner parts of Northern Moscow.

1995–2003: Northern Administrative Okrug (Aeroport District, Begovoy District, Golovinsky District, Khoroshyovsky District, Koptevo District, Savyolovsky District, Sokol District, Timiryazevsky District, Voykovsky District)
After the 1995 redistricting the constituency retained its territory but changed its name from Northern to Leningradsky constituency.

2003–2007: North-Western Administrative Okrug (Yuzhnoye Tushino District), Northern Administrative Okrug (Aeroport District, Begovoy District, Golovinsky District, Khoroshyovsky District, Koptevo District, Savyolovsky District, Sokol District, Timiryazevsky District, Voykovsky District)
The constituency was slightly changed following the 2003 redistricting, gaining Yuzhnoye Tushino District in North-Western Moscow from Tushino constituency.

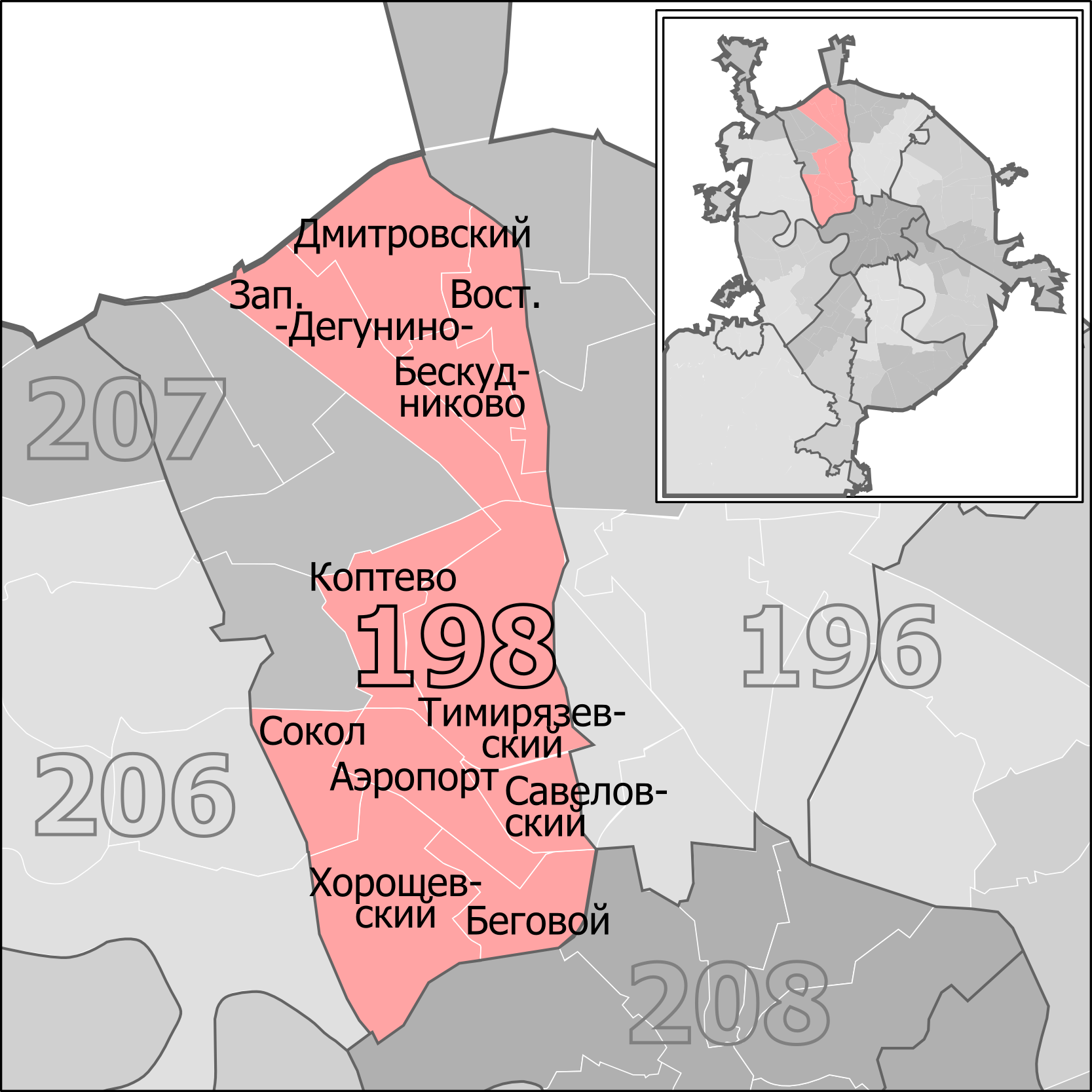
Constituency boundaries from 2016 to 2026

2016–2026: Northern Administrative Okrug (Aeroport District, Begovoy District, Beskudnikovsky District, Dmitrovsky District, Khoroshyovsky District, Koptevo District, Savyolovsky District, Sokol District, Timiryazevsky District, Vostochnoye Degunino District, Zapadnoye Degunino District)
The constituency was re-created for the 2016 election and retained most of its former territory, losing Golovinsky and Voykovsky districts to Khovrino constituency as well as Yuzhnoye Tushino District – to Tushino constituency. This seat instead gained eastern part of outer Northern Moscow from the former Sheremetyevo constituency.

2026–present: Northern Administrative Okrug (Aeroport District, Begovoy District, Beskudnikovsky District, Dmitrovsky District, Khoroshyovsky District, Koptevo District, Savyolovsky District, Timiryazevsky District, Vostochnoye Degunino District, Zapadnoye Degunino District)
Following the 2026 redistricting the constituency was slightly altered, losing Sokol District to Tushino constituency.

== Members elected ==
Election	Member	Party
1993	Alla Gerber	Independent
1995	Vladimir Lysenko	Pamfilova–Gurov–Lysenko
1999	Vladimir Lysenko	Independent
2003	Galina Khovanskaya	Yabloko
2007	Proportional representation - no election by constituency	
2011	Proportional representation - no election by constituency	
2016	Galina Khovanskaya	A Just Russia — For Truth
2021	Galina Khovanskaya	A Just Russia — For Truth
2026	Eldar Sharipov	United Russia

== Election results ==
=== 1993 ===
Summary of the 12 December 1993 Russian legislative election in the Northern constituency
Candidate	Party	Votes	%
Alla Gerber	Independent	44,977	18.43%
Vladimir Lysenko	Yavlinsky—Boldyrev—Lukin	42,044	17.23%
Dmitry Rogozin	Independent	20,589	8.44%
Sergey Mishin	Future of Russia–New Names	17,074	7.00%
Aleksandr Solovyev	Independent	16,462	6.75%
Sergey Kalashnikov	Liberal Democratic Party	12,595	5.16%
Vladimir Zhuravlev	Independent	10,891	4.46%
Konstantin Kalachev	Party of Russian Unity and Accord	5,446	2.23%
Igor Krugovykh	Independent	4,883	2.00%
Valentina Farafonova	Kedr	3,606	1.48%
Yury Tsypkin	Agrarian Party	3,493	1.43%
against all		47,704	19.55%
Total		244,037	100%

=== 1995 ===
Summary of the 17 December 1995 Russian legislative election in the Leningradsky constituency
Candidate	Party	Votes	%
Vladimir Lysenko	Pamfilova–Gurov–Lysenko	55,133	18.59%
Vladimir Zhuravlyov	Communist Party	34,442	11.61%
Alla Yaroshinskaya	Independent	28,630	9.65%
Aleksandr Dondukov	Congress of Russian Communities	26,695	9.00%
Vyacheslav Ageyev	Independent	19,134	6.45%
Oleg Samarin	Independent	17,517	5.91%
Vladimir Ivanov	Independent	14,701	4.96%
Larisa Grigoryeva	Kedr	12,250	4.13%
Aleksandr Aksanov	Independent	8,094	2.73%
Dmitry Shestakov	Beer Lovers Party	8,075	2.72%
Aleksandr Stankevich	Independent	6,453	2.18%
Aleksandr Slavinsky	Trade Unions and Industrialists – Union of Labour	5,882	1.98%
Eduard Savenko (Limonov)	Independent	5,555	1.87%
Georgy Lukava	Liberal Democratic Party	4,502	1.52%
Igor Krugovykh	Independent	3,011	1.02%
Vladimir Moiseyev	Stable Russia	2,944	0.99%
Oleg Vasenin	Independent	2,083	0.70%
against all		36,038	12.15%
Total		296,640	100%

=== 1999 ===
Summary of the 19 December 1999 Russian legislative election in the Leningradsky constituency
Candidate	Party	Votes	%
Vladimir Lysenko (incumbent)	Independent	56,396	19.15%
Yevgeny Chivilikhin	Fatherland – All Russia	54,534	18.51%
Galina Khovanskaya	Yabloko	46,774	15.88%
Yury Sulyanov	Communist Party	26,438	8.98%
Yury Polyakov	Andrey Nikolayev and Svyatoslav Fyodorov Bloc	16,243	5.51%
Vladimir Ivanov	Independent	14,476	4.91%
Vladimir Milovanov	Communists and Workers of Russia - for the Soviet Union	5,954	2.02%
Lyudmila Sedova	Party of Pensioners	5,555	1.89%
Lilia Pogodina	Russian Socialist Party	4,720	1.60%
Vladlen Gotsiridze	Independent	4,593	1.56%
Boris Shpilev	Independent	4,071	1.38%
Sergey Prokuda	Independent	2,328	0.79%
Viktor Suvorin	Independent	2,202	0.75%
against all		42,416	14.40%
Total		294,556	100%

=== 2003 ===
Summary of the 7 December 2003 Russian legislative election in the Leningradsky constituency
Candidate	Party	Votes	%
Galina Khovanskaya	Yabloko	87,090	29.59%
Vladimir Lysenko (incumbent)	Independent	74,119	25.18%
Vladimir Ulas	Communist Party	34,289	11.65%
Yevgeny Gromov	United Russian Party Rus'	14,891	5.06%
Viktor Arkhipov	Party of Russia's Rebirth-Russian Party of Life	9,842	3.34%
Andrey Svintsov	Liberal Democratic Party	7,376	2.51%
Oleg Gabrusev	Independent	3,629	1.23%
against all		57,066	19.39%
Total		295,869	100%

=== 2016 ===
Summary of the 18 September 2016 Russian legislative election in the Leningradsky constituency
Candidate	Party	Votes	%
Galina Khovanskaya	A Just Russia	52,623	31.09%
Yulia Galyamina	Yabloko	23,684	13.99%
Vasily Vlasov	Liberal Democratic Party	20,306	11.99%
Anton Tarasov	Communist Party	20,134	11.89%
Valery Kalachev	Rodina	10,214	6.03%
Andrey Nechayev	Party of Growth	9,628	5.69%
Ivan Onishchenko	Patriots of Russia	5,981	3.53%
Vyacheslav Makarov	People's Freedom Party	5,468	3.23%
Fyodor Obyedkov	The Greens	4,350	2.57%
Vitaly Shunkov	Communists of Russia	4,315	2.55%
Aleksandr Guskov	Civilian Power	2,464	1.46%
Yury Yurchenko	Civic Platform	1,839	1.09%
Total		169,287	100%

=== 2021 ===
Results by district: Galina Khovanskaya: 20–30% 30–40%; Anastasia Bryukhanova: 20–30% 30–40%

Summary of the 17-19 September 2021 Russian legislative election in the Leningradsky constituency
Candidate	Party	Votes	%
Galina Khovanskaya (incumbent)	A Just Russia — For Truth	68,959	28.78%
Anastasia Bryukhanova	Independent	55,764	23.28%
Pyotr Zvyagintsev	Communist Party	27,586	11.51%
Marina Litvinovich	Yabloko	18,270	7.63%
Sangadzhi Tarbayev	New People	12,824	5.35%
Vasily Vlasov	Liberal Democratic Party	12,243	5.11%
Zoya Andrianova	The Greens	10,035	4.19%
Viktor Katayev	Russian Party of Freedom and Justice	8,758	3.66%
Aleksey Balabutkin	Communists of Russia	7,732	3.23%
Aleksey Melnikov	Independent	7,458	3.11%
Alisa Goluyenko	Green Alternative	3,368	1.41%
Total		239,587	100%

=== 2026 ===
Summary of the 18-20 September 2026 Russian legislative election in the Leningradsky constituency
Candidate	Party	Votes	%
Eldar Sharipov	United Russia	90,666	34.80%
Anastasia Pavlyuchenkova	New People	37,721	14.48%
Grigory Grishin	Yabloko	34,456	13.22%
Galina Khovanskaya (incumbent)	A Just Russia	31,253	11.99%
Matvey Zotov	Communist Party	22,923	8.80%
Aleksandr Shprygin	Liberal Democratic Party	19,433	7.46%
Vladimir Gorbachev	Communists of Russia	10,422	4.00%
Natalia Tsarenkova	The Greens	9,157	3.51%
Anton Palyulin	Party of Direct Democracy	3,422	1.31%
Total		260,567	100%
