= Timiryazevsky Park =

Forest park in Moscow, Russia

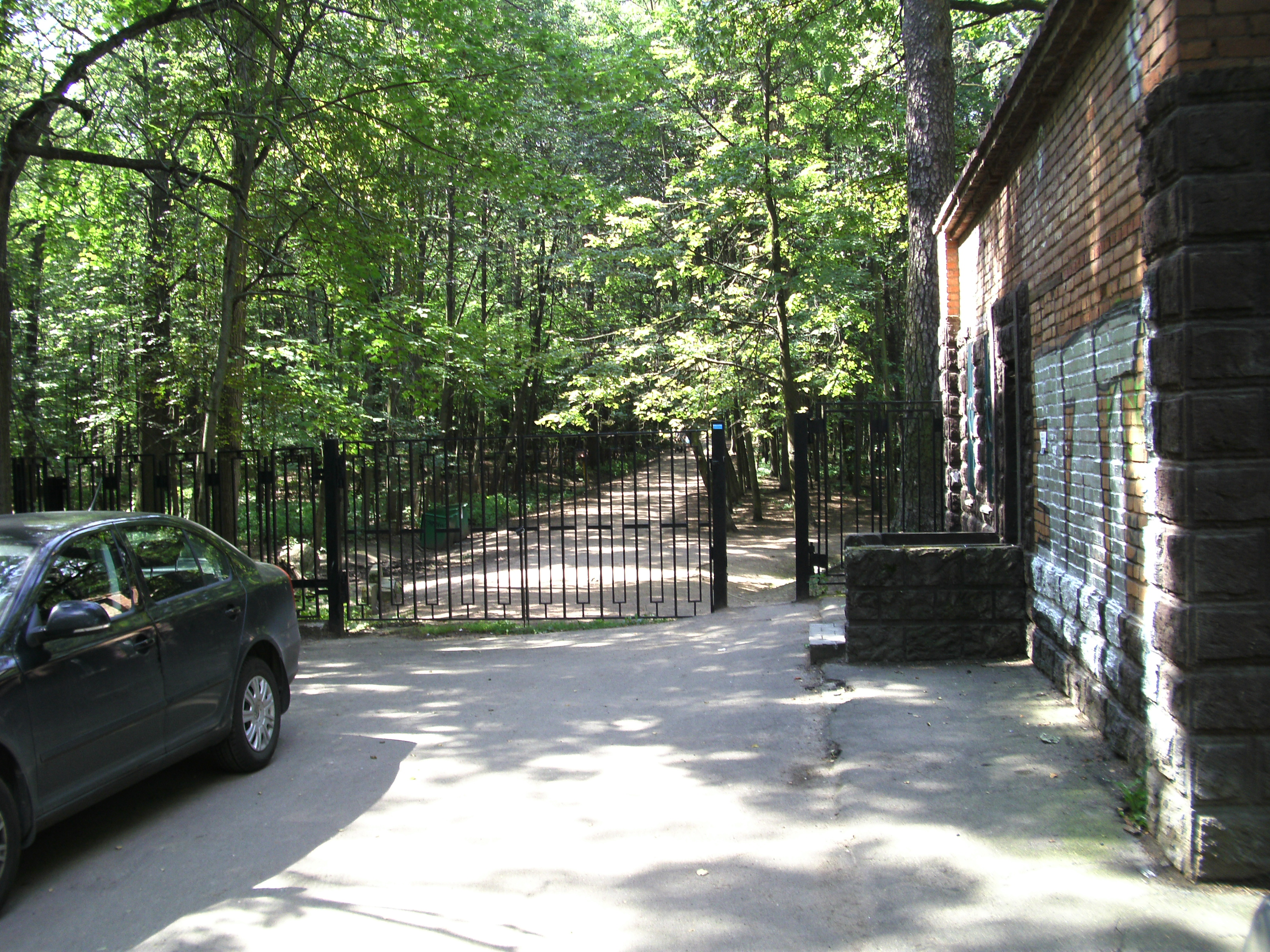
- Entrance to the park from Pasechnaya Street

- Location within Moscow
- Location: Moscow, Timiryazevsky District, Russia
- Coordinates: 55.819°N 37.545°E
- Area: 232 hectares (570 acres)
- Status: Cultural heritage of Russia

Timiryazevsky Park (also known as the Experimental Forest Dacha of the Russian State Agrarian University – Moscow Timiryazev Agricultural Academy) is a forest park located in the north of Moscow. It lies within the Timiryazevsky District of the Northern Administrative Okrug and covers an area of 232 hectares. The territory is federally owned.

== History ==
The history of the park spans several centuries. In the 16th century, the village of Semchino was located here; it was later renamed Petrovskoye-Razumovskoye. In the 17th century, the village belonged to Kirill Naryshkin, the grandfather of Peter the Great. It is known that Peter himself visited the forest area and personally planted several oak trees.

In 1865, the Petrovsky Agricultural and Forestry Academy (now the Russian State Agrarian University – Moscow Timiryazev Agricultural Academy) was founded on this land. The establishment of the Experimental Forest Dacha was overseen by the renowned forester Alfons Vargas de Bedemar. Under his leadership, the forest was divided into 14 sections by clearings. Since 1865, scientific research has been conducted on the territory of the Experimental Forest Dacha, focusing on the growth and productivity of stands of the main forest-forming tree species. Experimental plantings were carried out under the guidance of notable foresters such as M. K. Tursky, N. S. Nesterov, and V. P. Timofeev.

== Facilities and Features ==
The park currently hosts the following facilities:

- Timofeev Selection Station, established in 1992 by the Russian State Agrarian University – Timiryazev Academy, to preserve the scientific tradition of vegetable crop breeding, founded by Professor A. V. Kryuchkov.
- Vegetable Research Center named after V. I. Edelstein, founded by V. I. Edelstein in 1918. Since 1965, the station has borne his name. Between 2000 and 2002, a major renovation was carried out, and new greenhouses covering 1.1 hectares were built using French-made structures by Richel Serres de France. They are equipped with automated climate control and fertilizing systems.
- Agrochemical Soil Science Laboratory
- Fruit Growing Laboratory
- Floriculture Laboratory
- V. A. Mikhelson Meteorological Observatory
- Botanical Garden
- Dendrological Garden named after R. I. Schroeder
- Equestrian Sports Complex
- Experimental Forest Dacha
- In the northern part of the park lies the Bolshoy Sadovy Pond.
- The Zhabenka River flows through the park, mostly in an underground channel.
- A small cemetery, reportedly containing the graves of about a dozen professors and scientists involved in agriculture, as well as members of their families. Two additional graves from 1926 and 1946 are located near the "Young Forester's Trail".

== Gallery ==
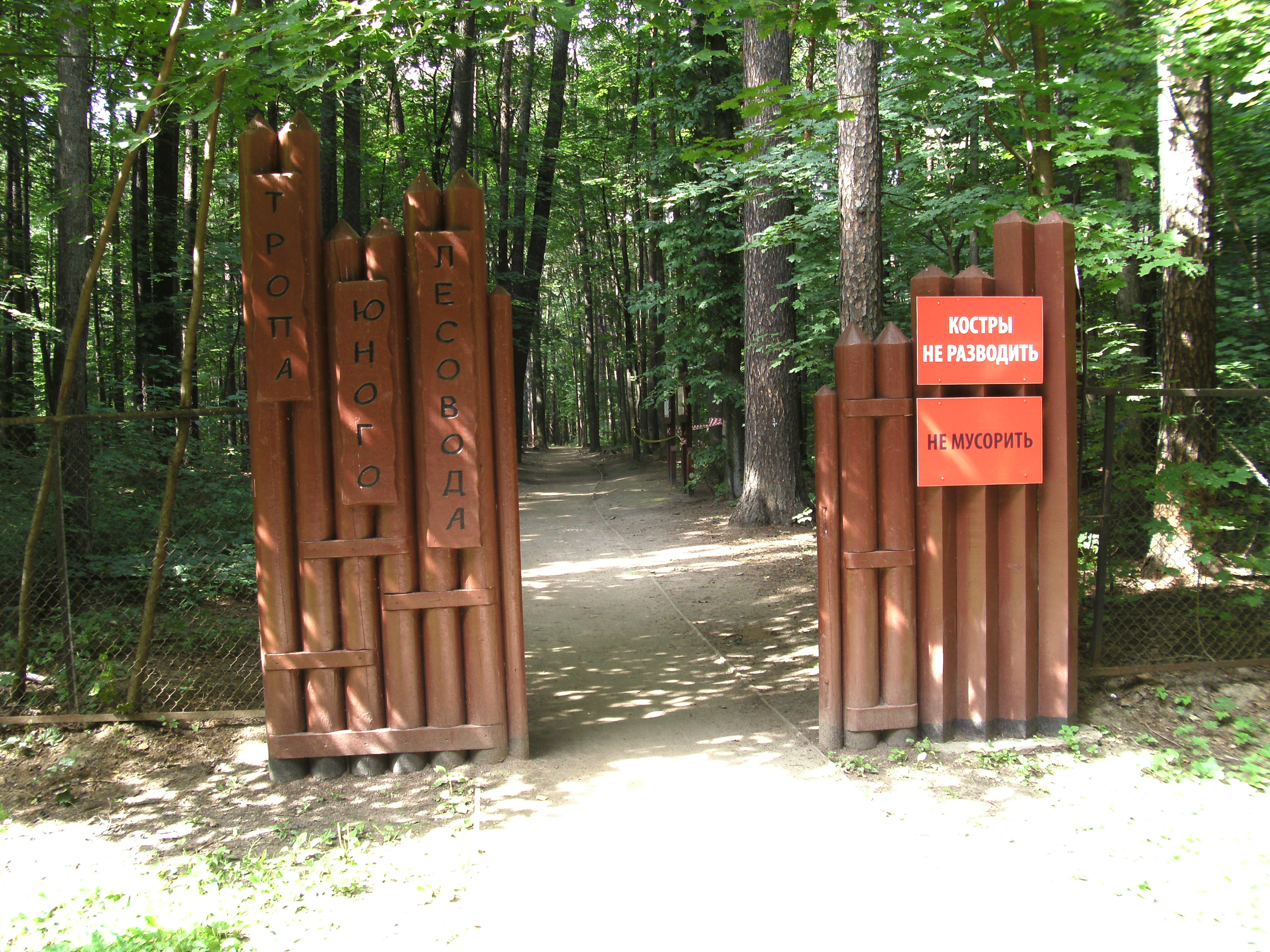
Young Forester's Trail

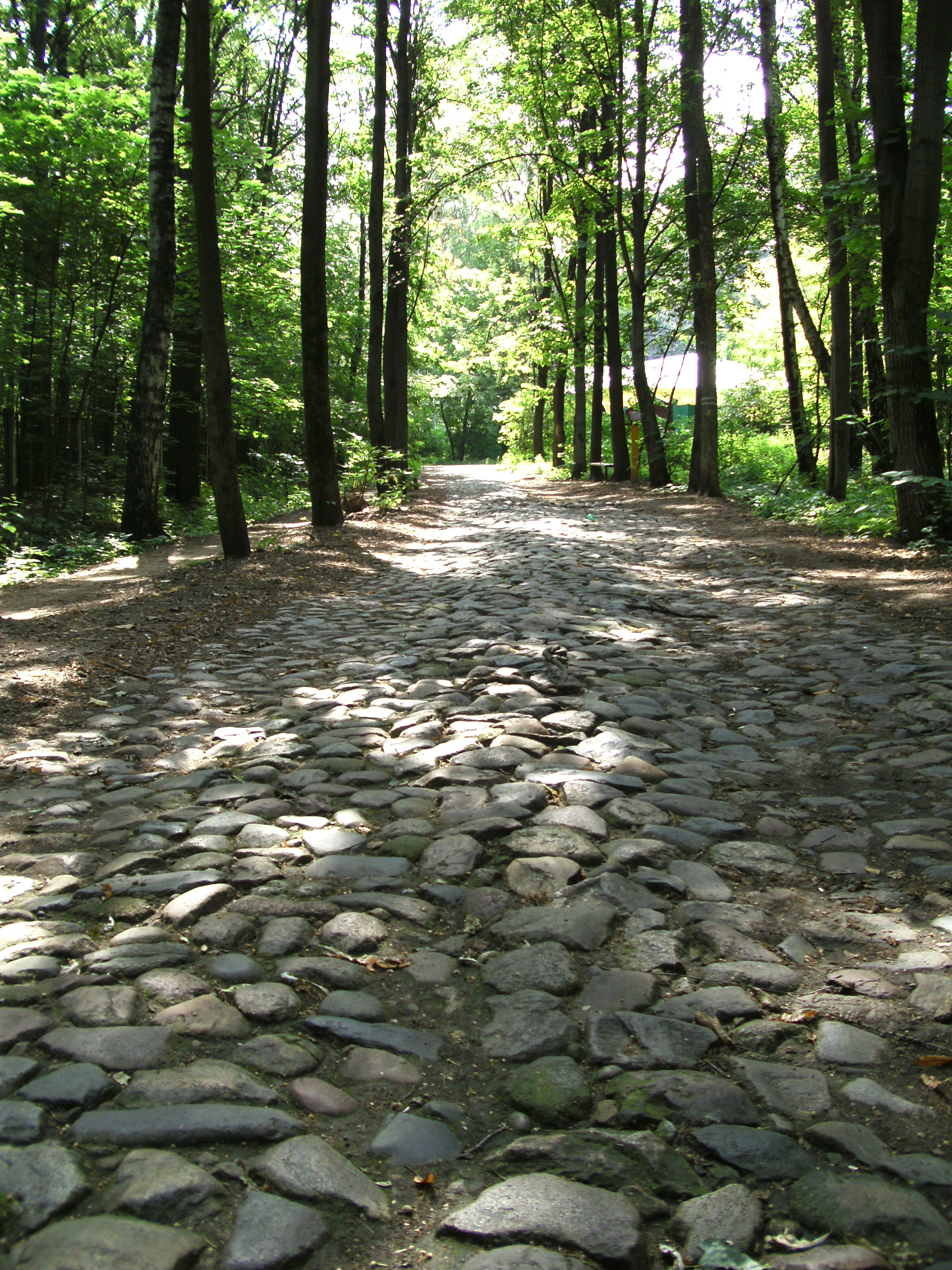
Birch Alley

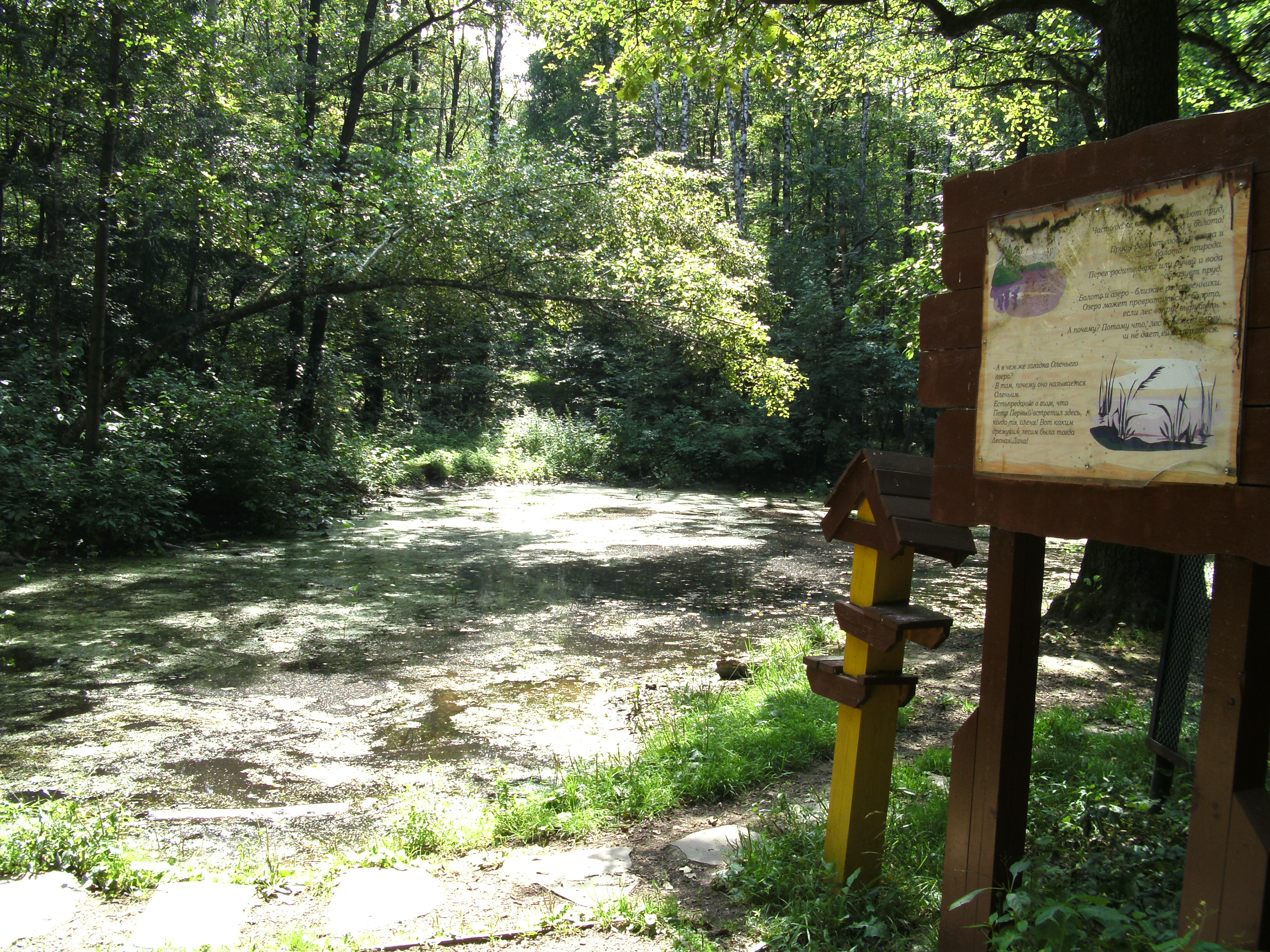
Deer Lake

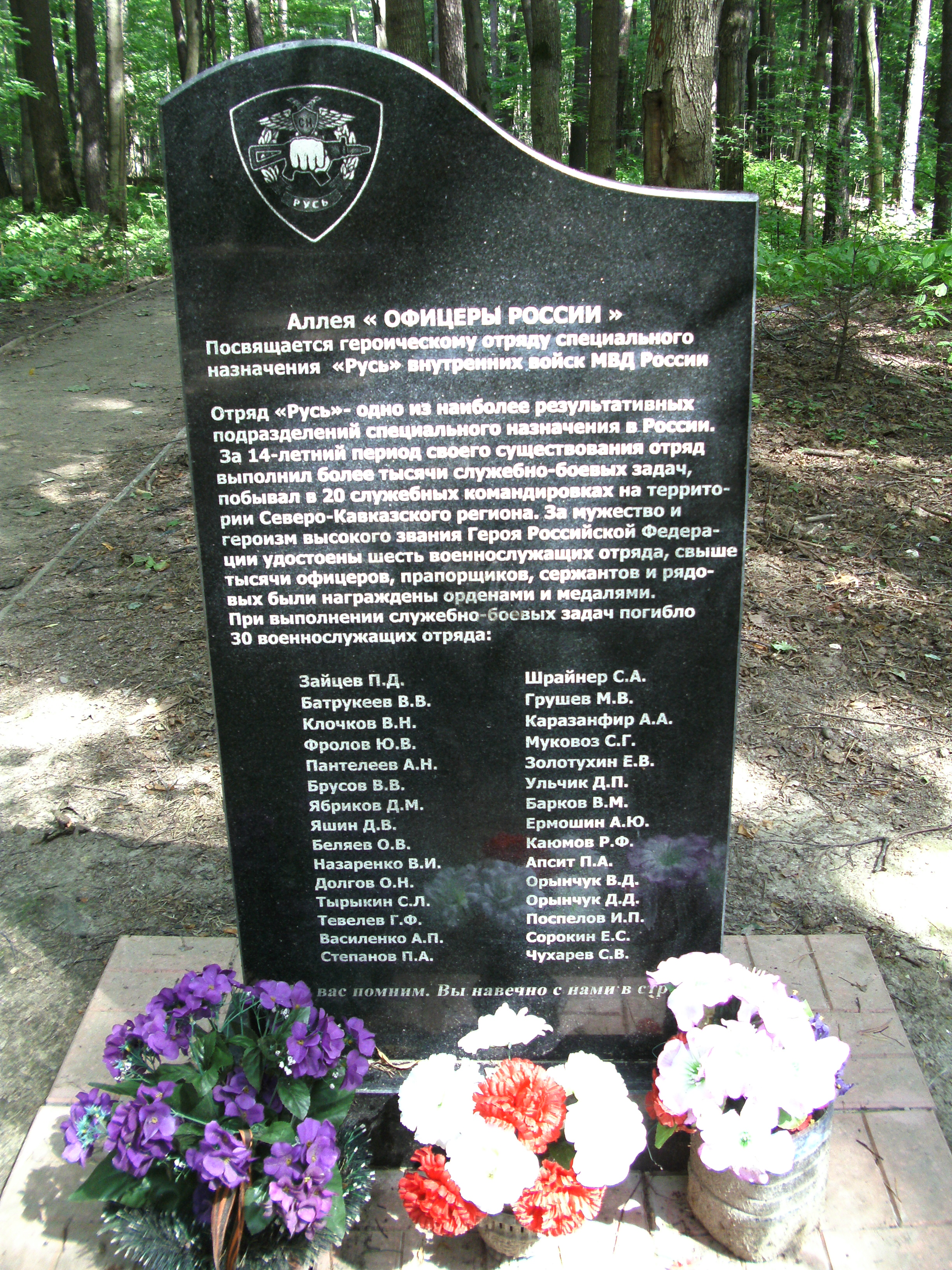
Obelisk in memory of Special Forces troops of "Rus" who died in the line of duty

== Issues ==
Timiryazevsky Park is a popular recreational area for Moscow residents. Some visitors hold picnics and light open fires, which poses a risk of forest fires. Additionally, a large amount of litter is often left behind by parkgoers.

A more serious threat to the park's green areas is posed by construction projects near its boundaries. These developments can lead to waterlogging of the soil, causing tree roots to rot and negatively affecting vegetation.

== Flora and Fauna ==
Timiryazevsky Park is one of the few locations in Moscow where natural populations of amphibians have been preserved. The park is home to species such as common frogs (*Rana temporaria*), moor frogs (*Rana arvalis*), lake frogs (*Pelophylax ridibundus*), and smooth newts (*Lissotriton vulgaris*).
