= Sokol, Moscow =

Sokol Сокол
- Area of Moscow
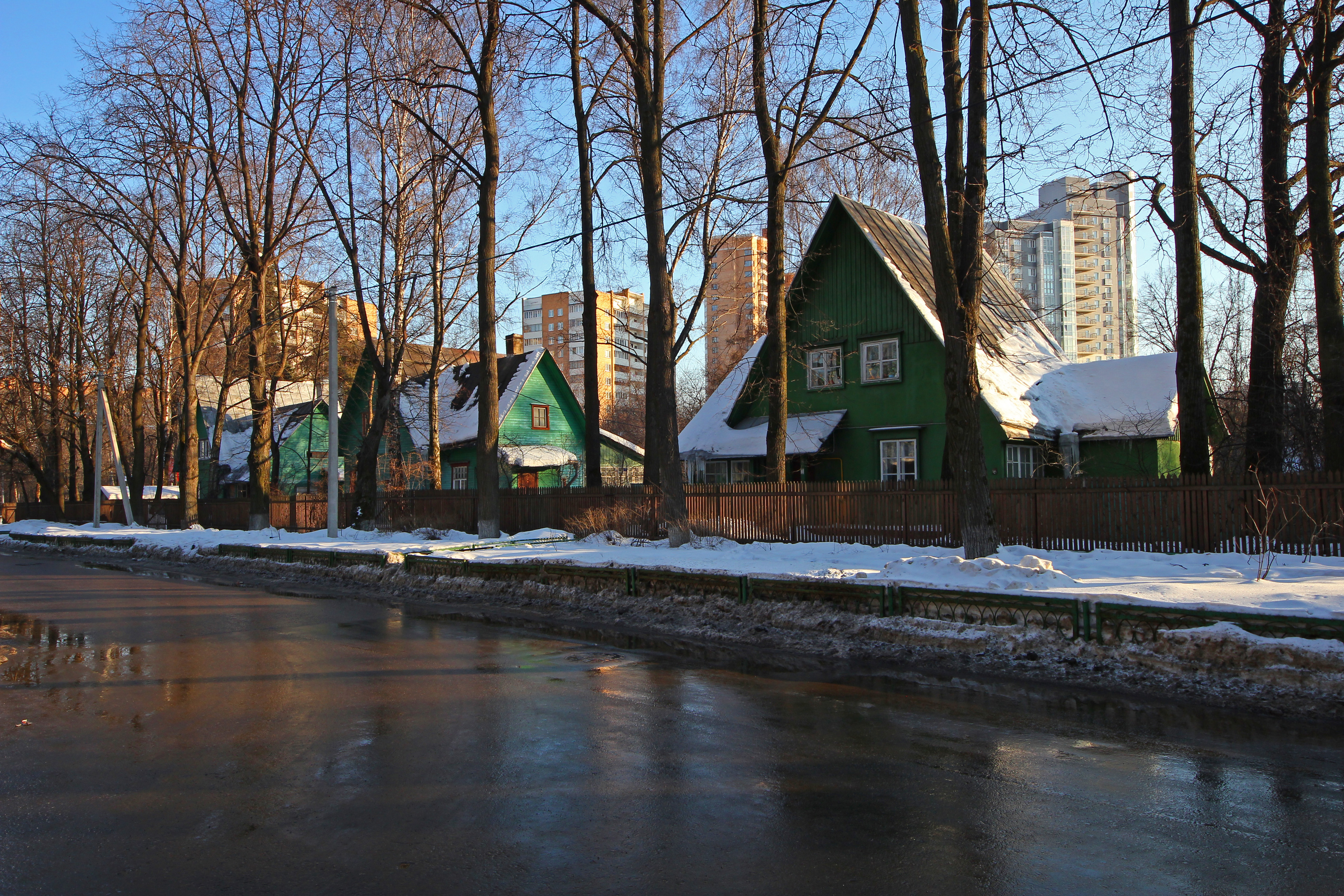

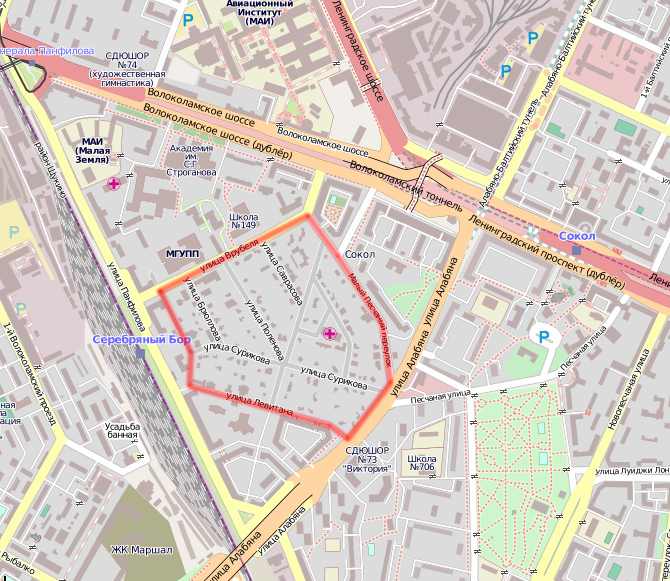
- Coordinates: 55°48′10″N 37°30′08″E
- Country: Russia
- City: Moscow
- District: Sokol
- Built: 1923-1930

Area
  - Total: 0.09 km^{2} (0.035 sq mi)

Sokol (Russian: Сокол) also known as "artists' settlement" (Russian: посёлок художников) is the first cooperative residential settlement in Moscow, founded in 1923. It is located in the Northern Administrative Okrug, not far from the later built Sokol metro station. The settlement "Sokol" became one of the embodiments of the garden city concept. Since 1979, the settlement has been under state protection as a monument to urban development of the first years of Soviet power. Since 1989, the settlement "Sokol" has been self-governing. The architects of the settlement "Sokol" implemented the concept of the "garden city", which was popular in the early 20th century. The idea of a settlement that would combine the best features of the city and the village was put forward by the British Ebenezer Howard in 1898. As early as 1903, a project appeared to build a similar garden city on Khodynka Field in Moscow. This project was being developed for some time, but the events of 1914-1917 prevented its implementation. The urban development plans of the 1920s – "New Moscow" by Alexey Shchusev and "Greater Moscow" by Sergei Shestako – also widely used the idea of a "garden city". The outskirts and suburbs of Moscow were supposed to be built up with settlements consisting of low-rise buildings, which were to have their own libraries, clubs, sports and children's playgrounds and kindergartens.

== History ==
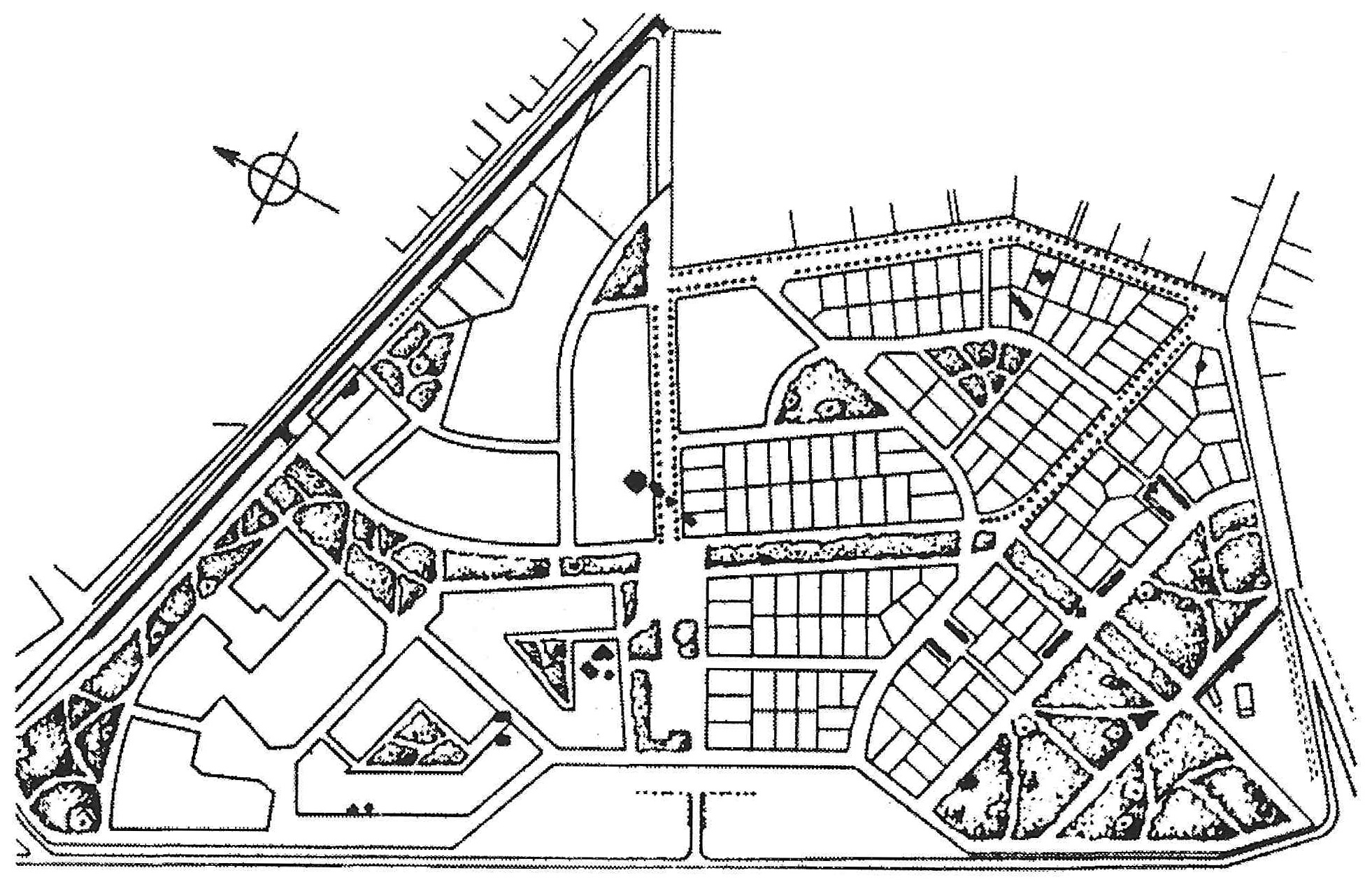
The original plan of the Sokol settlement (1923, architects B. M. Velikovsky, P. M. Nakhman)

The original plan of the settlement "Sokol" (1923, architects B. M. Velikovsky, P. M. Nakhman). On August 8, 1921, Vladimir Lenin signed a decree on cooperative housing construction, according to which cooperative associations and individual citizens were granted the right to develop city plots. At that time, Moscow was in dire need of housing, and the authorities allocated very little money for its construction.

The Sokol housing and construction cooperative society was formed in March 1923, and on April 11, the first organized meeting of the cooperative was held. The society included employees of the people's commissariats, economists, artists, teachers, agronomists, technical intelligentsia and workers. The first chairman of the board of the Sokol cooperative was the chairman of the Vsekohudozhnik trade union Vasily Sakharov. The cooperative leased a plot of land on the outskirts of the village of Vsekhsvyatskoye with an area of 49 dessiatines with the obligation to build it up with approximately 200 houses in 7 years. Already in the fall of 1923, construction of the Sokol settlement began there.

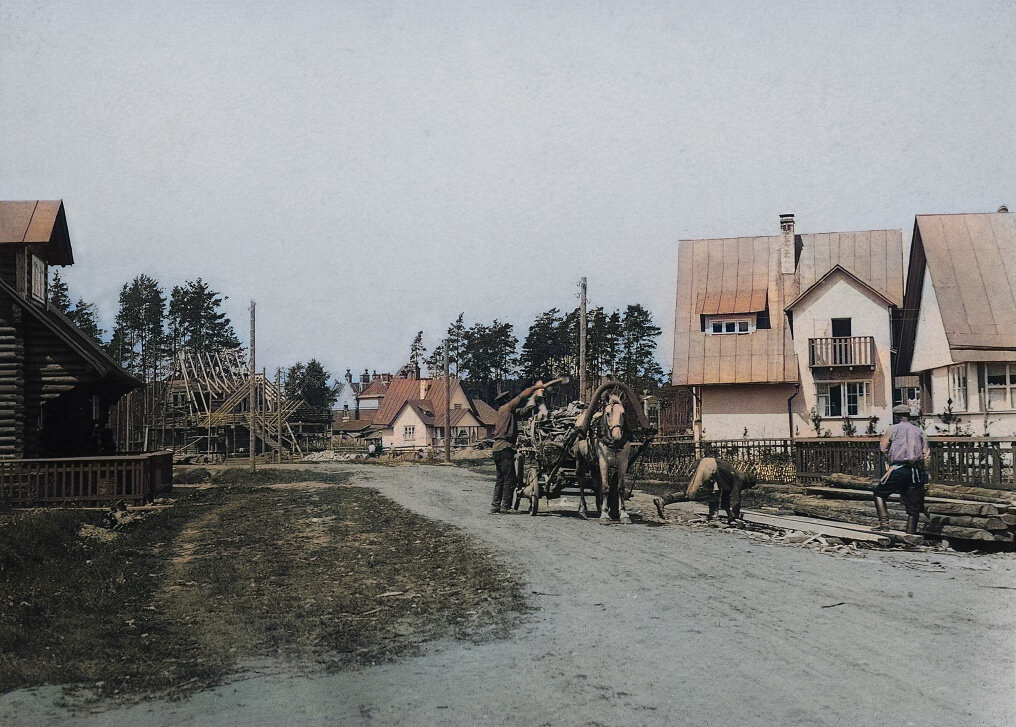
Surikova street in the mid-1920s

The members-shareholders of the cooperative were granted the right to use the living space for 35 years without any restrictions. The share contributions of the Sokol cooperative were 10.5 gold chervonets for joining, 30 for allocating a plot, and 20 for starting construction. The total cost of a cottage, which was paid over several years, was 600 chervonets. These were fairly high prices, which were not affordable for everyone.

=== Origin of the name ===
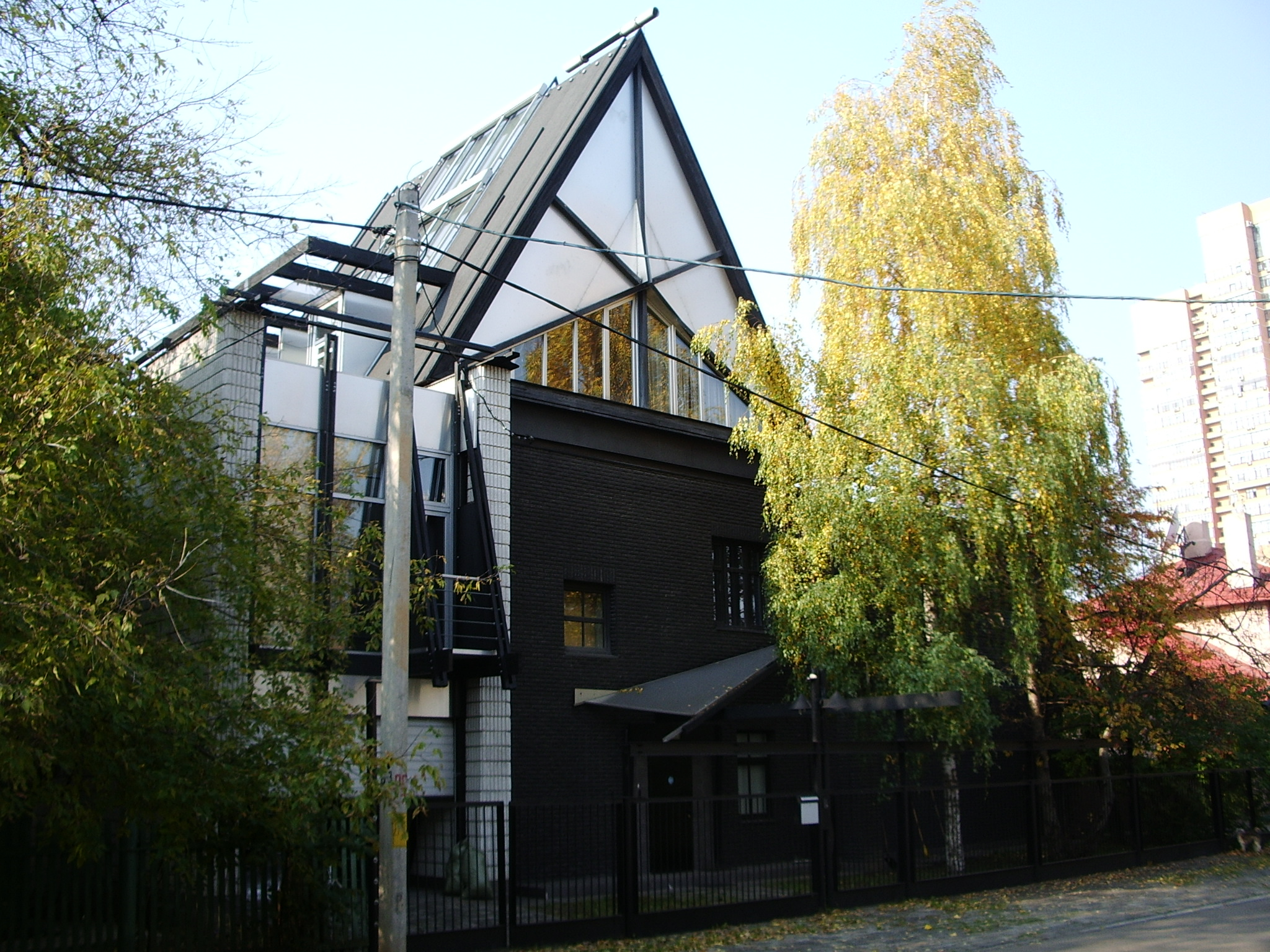
"Yin-Yang" House (architect Vladislav Platonov) at 7 Savrasova street

There is still no consensus on why the village was named Sokol. According to the most common version, this village was originally planned to be built in Sokolniki - hence the name. There was even a seal with an image of a falcon holding a house. However, plans changed later, and land near the village of Vsekhsvyatskoye was allocated for the village, but the housing cooperative retained its name. According to another version, put forward by the historian P. V. Sytin, the settlement was named after the agronomist and livestock breeder A. I. Sokol, who lived here and bred pedigree pigs in his yard. Another version says that the settlement got its name from a construction tool - the plastering falcon.

Nikolai Markovnikov, the Vesnin brothers, I. I. Kondakov and other architects participated in the design of the settlement. Non-standard spatial solutions were used in the planning of the streets. The houses of the settlement were built according to individual projects. The construction of the settlement was mainly completed by the beginning of the 1930s. A total of 114 houses with all the amenities were built.

As the settlement was being built, its social and household infrastructure was formed. Two grocery stores were built. The partnership opened a library and a canteen at its own expense. Two sports grounds were built in the settlement. A park was laid out on the odd side of Levitan Street. In 1927, a kindergarten was opened in the settlement "Sokol". Its staff included only one teacher, and the rest of the work was done in shifts by mothers on duty.

In the late 1920s, the concept of developing Sokol with individual residential buildings was criticized. The ideology of that time assumed the construction of collective workers' houses. It is noteworthy that one of the critics of Sokol was the author of the general plan of the settlement and the architect of most of its houses, Nikolai Markovnikov. Taking into account the realities of the time, several apartment buildings for workers were built in the settlement in the late 1920s and early 1930s.

=== The settlement in the 1930s ===
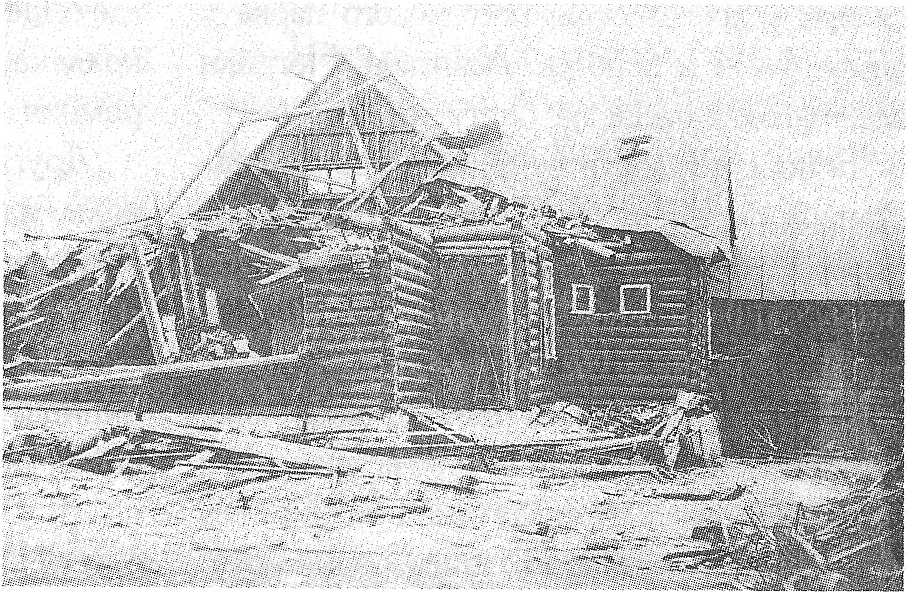
Building no. 4 at Levitana street following aviation accident in the skies above the settlement

In the early 1930s, part of the territory that had not yet been built up (between Vrubel Street and Volokolamsk Highway) was confiscated from the settlement of Sokol. Several residential buildings for NKVD employees were built there. In 1938, a four-story maternity hospital No. 16 with 200 beds was built on the site of the park in the center of the village.

On May 18, 1935, an air crash occurred in the sky over the village of Sokol. The largest Soviet aircraft of that time, the ANT-20 "Maxim Gorky", collided with an escort fighter. The wreckage of the planes fell on the village. Everyone on board the planes died, but there were no casualties among the residents of the village.

In 1936, cooperative construction in the country was curtailed. All houses in the village of Sokol became the property of Moscow. Many residents of the village became victims of Stalin's repressions, including the chairman of the cooperative V. F. Sakharov and the deputy chairman N. Ya. Yanek.

=== The village during the war ===
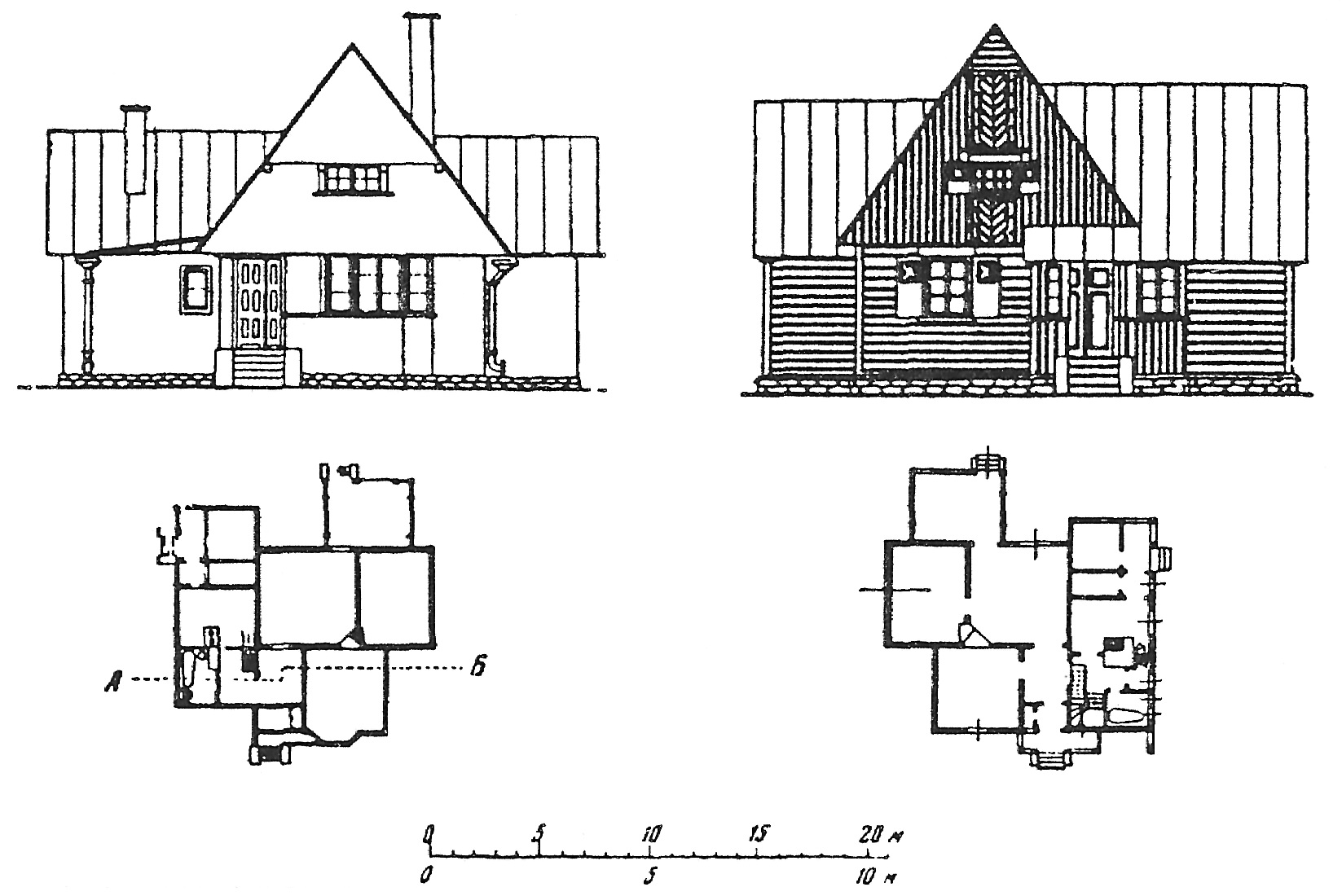
Projects of a house for one family (arch. N. Markovnikov)

In 1941, after the start of the Great Patriotic War, several self-defense groups were formed in the village of Sokol. Residents of the village built simple shelters on their plots of land. One of the lines of Moscow fortifications passed through the village. The barricade passed through Vrubel, Savrasov, Shishkin, Venetsianov and Levitan streets. The fortifications consisted of an anti-tank ditch, embrasures and obstacles. An anti-aircraft battery was located in the park near Levitan street. During the war, several incendiary and high-explosive bombs were dropped on the village. One of them completely destroyed two cottages at the beginning of Bryullov street (a four-story apartment building was later built in their place).

=== The settlement in the 1940s-1970s ===
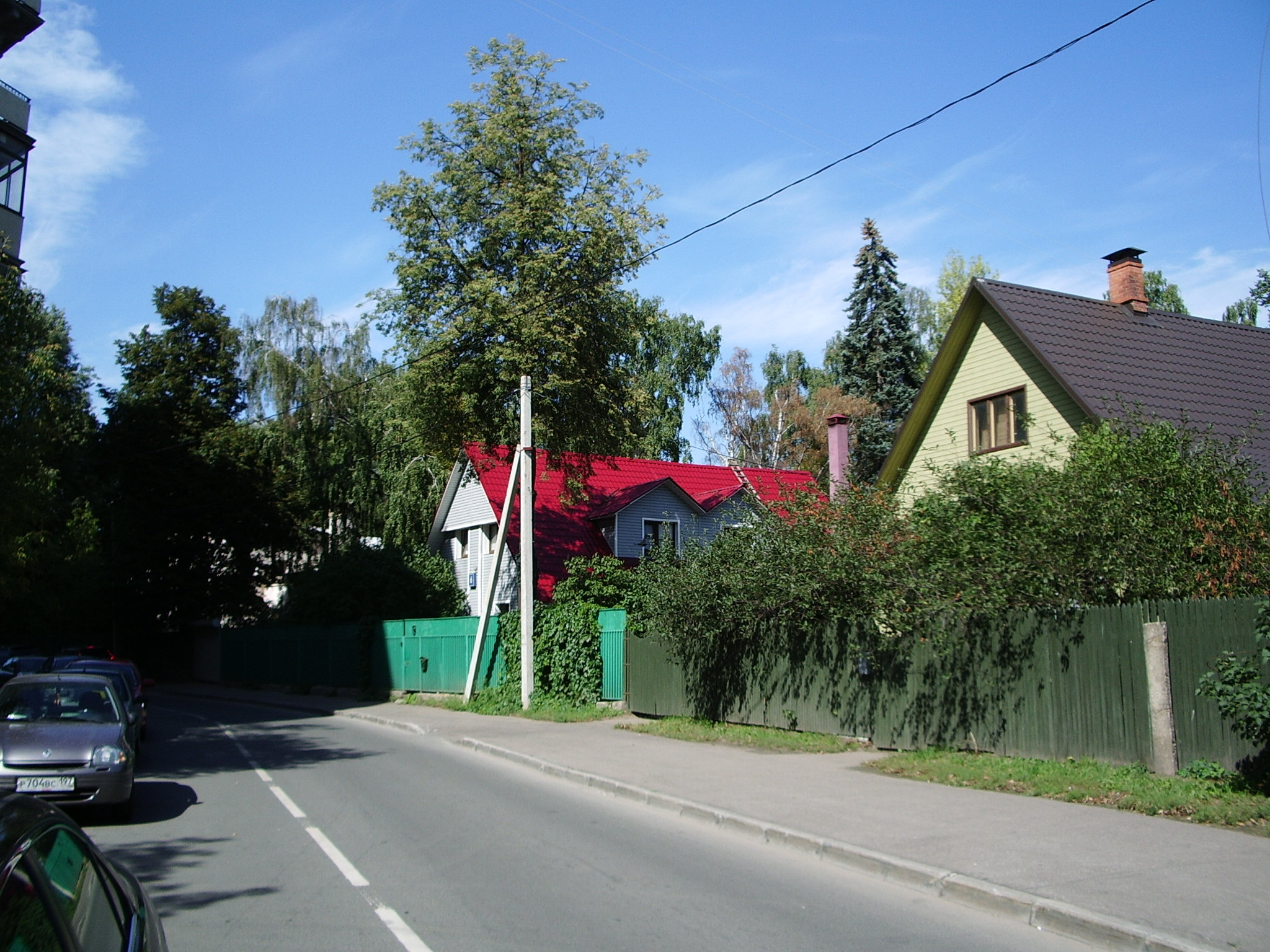
Levitana street in the settlement

In 1946–1948, all the houses in the settlement were connected to the city sewer system. In 1958–1962, more than half of the cottages were overhauled. Most of the log houses were boarded up and painted. At the same time, the stove heating was replaced with local water heating using water-heating boilers that ran on coal. In 1963–1964, gas was installed in the settlement.

Since the early 1950s, attempts to demolish the settlement began. According to legend, Stalin spoke out against this when he visited a construction site on neighboring Novopeschanaya Street. In 1958, a plan was made to build multi-story residential buildings on part of the settlement's territory. However, thanks to the efforts of Sokol residents, this project was cancelled in 1962. Soon a new project appeared to demolish 54 of the 119 cottages: “…it’s high time to bulldoze the village’s ‘chicken coops’,” the district executive committee threatened. But this time, Sokol was also saved. The Ministry of Culture, the Society for the Protection of Monuments, and the Union of Architects opposed the demolition of the village as a single architectural complex. As a result, by decision of the Moscow City Council No. 1384 of May 25, 1979, the village was placed under state protection as an urban development monument of the first years of Soviet power.

=== Modern period ===
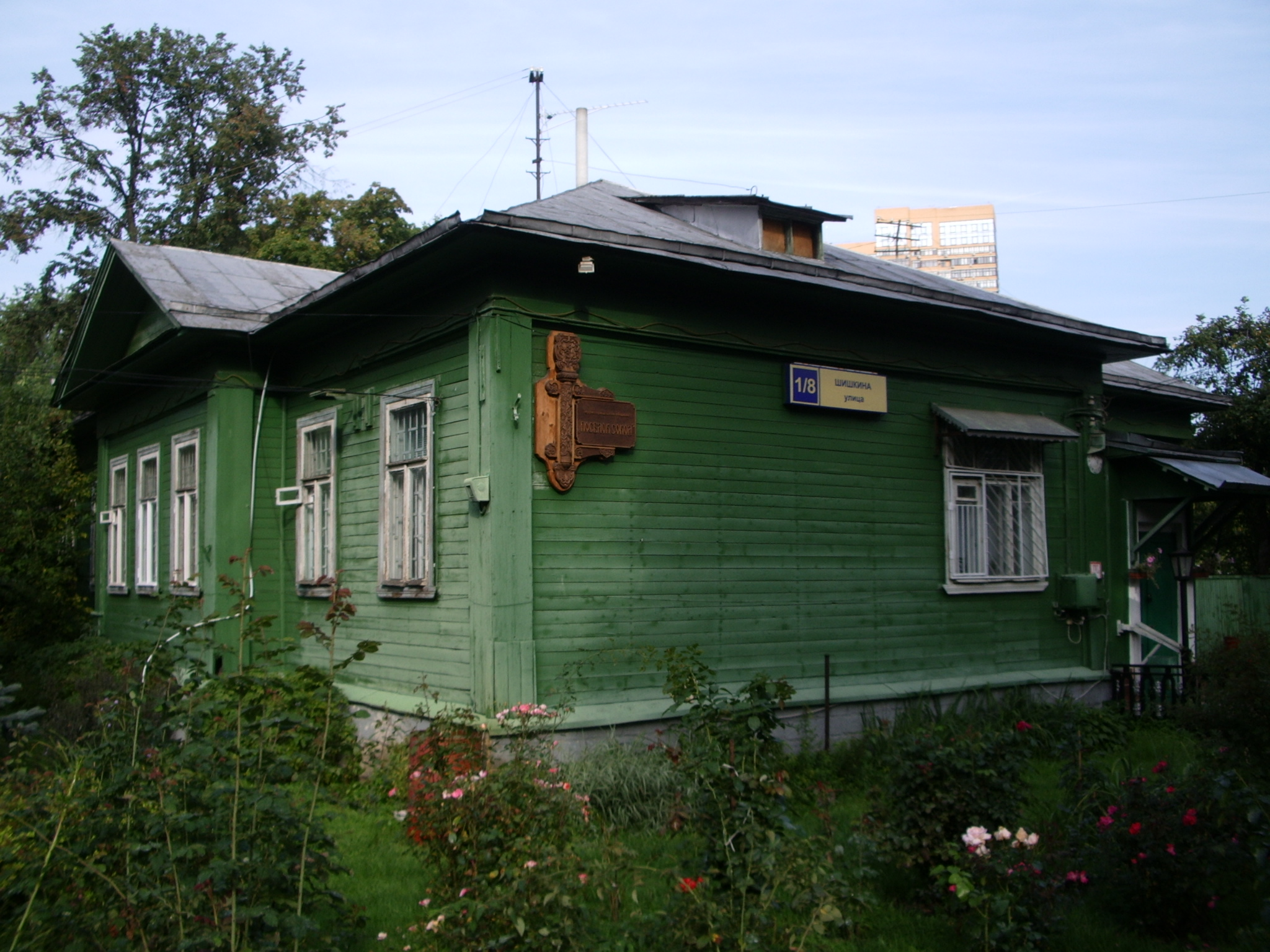
Building of the territorial community and museum

In the late 1980s, commercial activity began to develop in the country. At the same time, the authorities allocated little money for the maintenance of the village. Then the residents organized a structure to earn money for the maintenance of the village - the Sokol agency. The agency brought in profits from work performed on a contractual basis. Its income many times exceeded the amount of funds allocated by the district executive committee. In order for residents to be able to more effectively resolve territorial issues, on July 14, 1989, a territorial public self-government was established in the village.

Through the efforts of the self-government, a significant amount of repair and restoration work was carried out. Various festive events were organized in the village, and the newspaper Voice of Sokol was published. A playground and an obelisk in memory of those killed in the Great Patriotic War appeared in the center of the village. In 1998, Sokol celebrated its 75th anniversary. The opening of the village museum was timed to coincide with this date.

In the 1990s and 2000s, many residents of the village began to sell their houses, as their value had become very high. Despite the fact that the status of an architectural monument obliges home owners to coordinate all construction work with the Moscow Heritage Committee, some of the old houses in the village were demolished, and luxury mansions were erected in their place. Some buildings are included in the list of the most expensive houses in Moscow according to Forbes magazine.

In February 2010, after a scandal with the demolition of several houses in the Moscow village of Rechnik, the prefect of the Northern Administrative District of Moscow Oleg Mitvol contacted the prosecutor's office to check the legality of the construction of 30 new houses in the village of Sokol. Soon a rally was held in the village, at which those gathered demanded that the historical buildings be preserved. The situation around the Sokol settlement was widely covered in the press, but nevertheless it did not develop in any way, and the new buildings were not torn down.

== Architecture ==
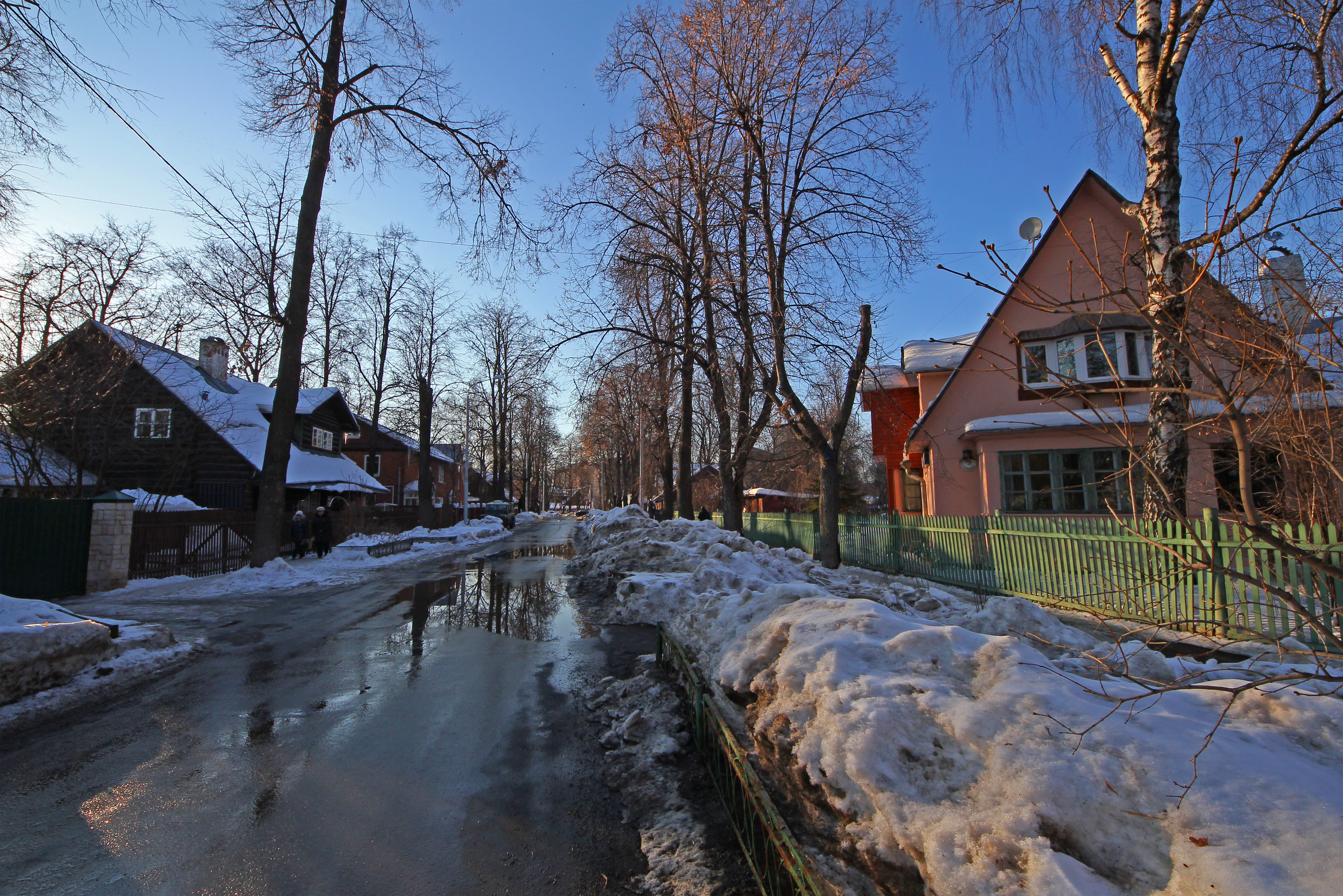
View of Surikova street in the settlement

Most of the buildings in the settlement were designed by architect Nikolai Markovnikov In addition to him, the architects Vesnin brothers, I. I. Kondakov, A. G. Kovykov, P. N. Kruchinin, and A. Semiletov participated in the design and construction.

Initially, it was planned to build up the settlement "Sokol" with three types of cottages: log, frame-fill and brick. Later, each of the types of houses was varied many times. According to the architects' plans, various designs and materials were used. Since "Sokol" was the first-born of the Soviet housing and construction cooperative, it became a kind of base for testing architectural solutions.

Many of the buildings in the settlement were experimental. Some technologies used in the construction of "Sokol" were later introduced into mass construction. In addition to traditional building materials, peat plywood, straw blocks, fibrolite, and cinder blocks were used. In 1948, two experimental residential buildings were built on Surikov Street according to the design of Z. M. Rozenfeld.

Several houses were built based on the Russian buildings of the 17th-18th centuries. The log wooden huts of the Vesnin brothers, built in the style of Vologda wooden architecture, were especially famous. Symmetrically located wooden Izbas on Polenova Street resemble northern watchtowers.

The architectural ensemble of the Sokol settlement was unique in many ways. The experience of Sokol was used in the construction of the Akademgorodok, the settlement of Pavlovo in the Leningrad Oblast, as well as workers' settlements on Usachevka, on Begovaya Street and in Bogorodskoye

== Layout ==
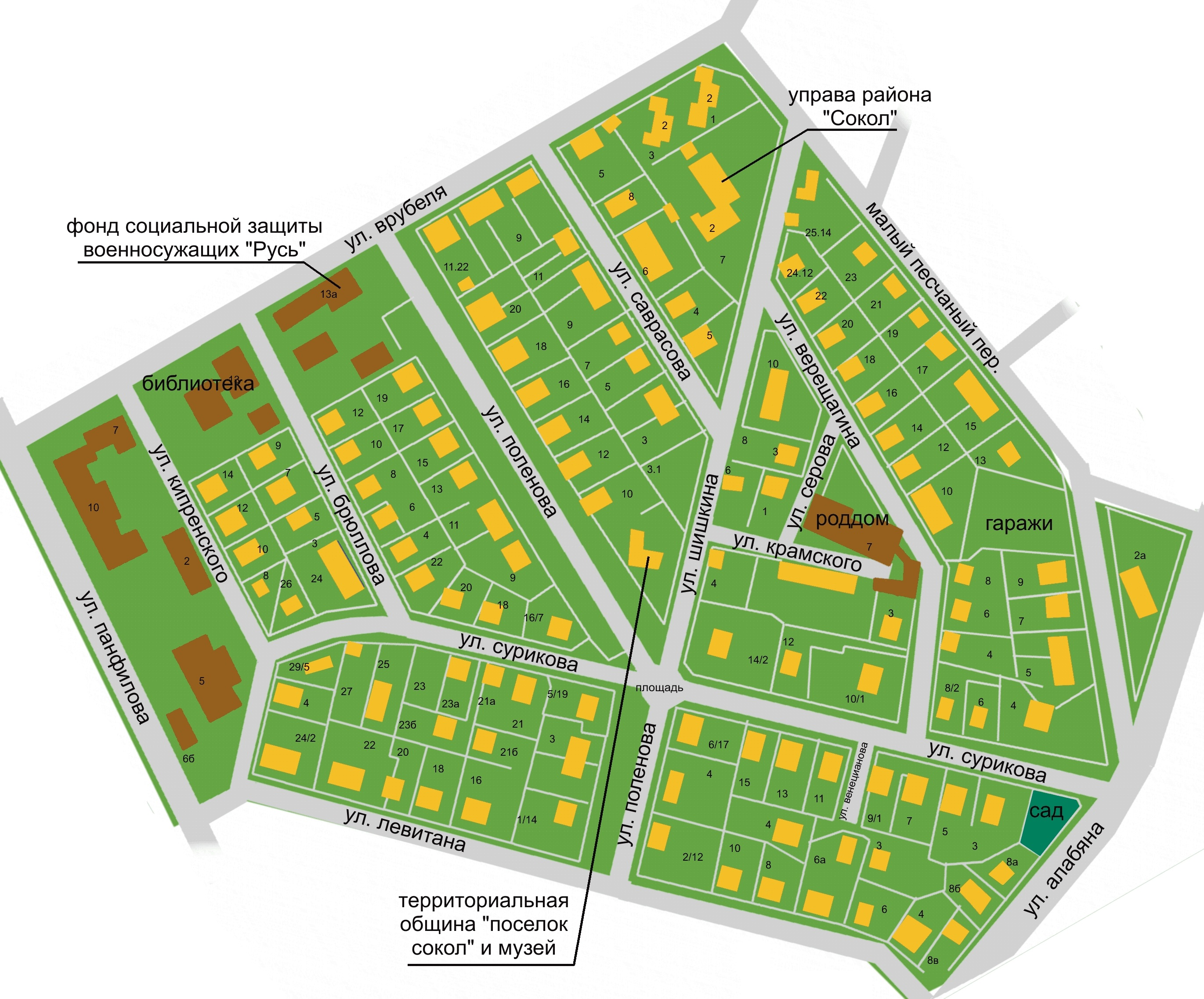
The urban layout of the settlement

The original plan for the Sokol settlement was developed by N. V. Markovnikov using the Hippodamian system: the streets intersected at right angles and divided the settlement into several identical blocks. But later V. A. Vesnin joined the work on the plan, and together they decided to give preference to a free layout.

Great importance was attached to the perception of the environment. This concept was developed by the philosopher P. A. Florensky and the graphic artist V. A. Favorsky. The streets of the settlement were laid out in such a way as to visually expand the space. For example, Surikov Street is divided into three parts of different widths, due to which it seems very long from one end and short from the other. Polenova Street is “broken” at an angle of 45° in its central part, and therefore it seems longer and wider. The facades of some houses do not have windows, so as not to linger on them.

The village "Sokol" occupies an area of 21 hectares. Each plot has an area of approximately 9 acres.

== See also ==
- Urban planning in Russia
- Urban planning in communist countries
