= Galina Khovanskaya =

Russian politician

Galina Khovanskaya MP
- Галина Хованская
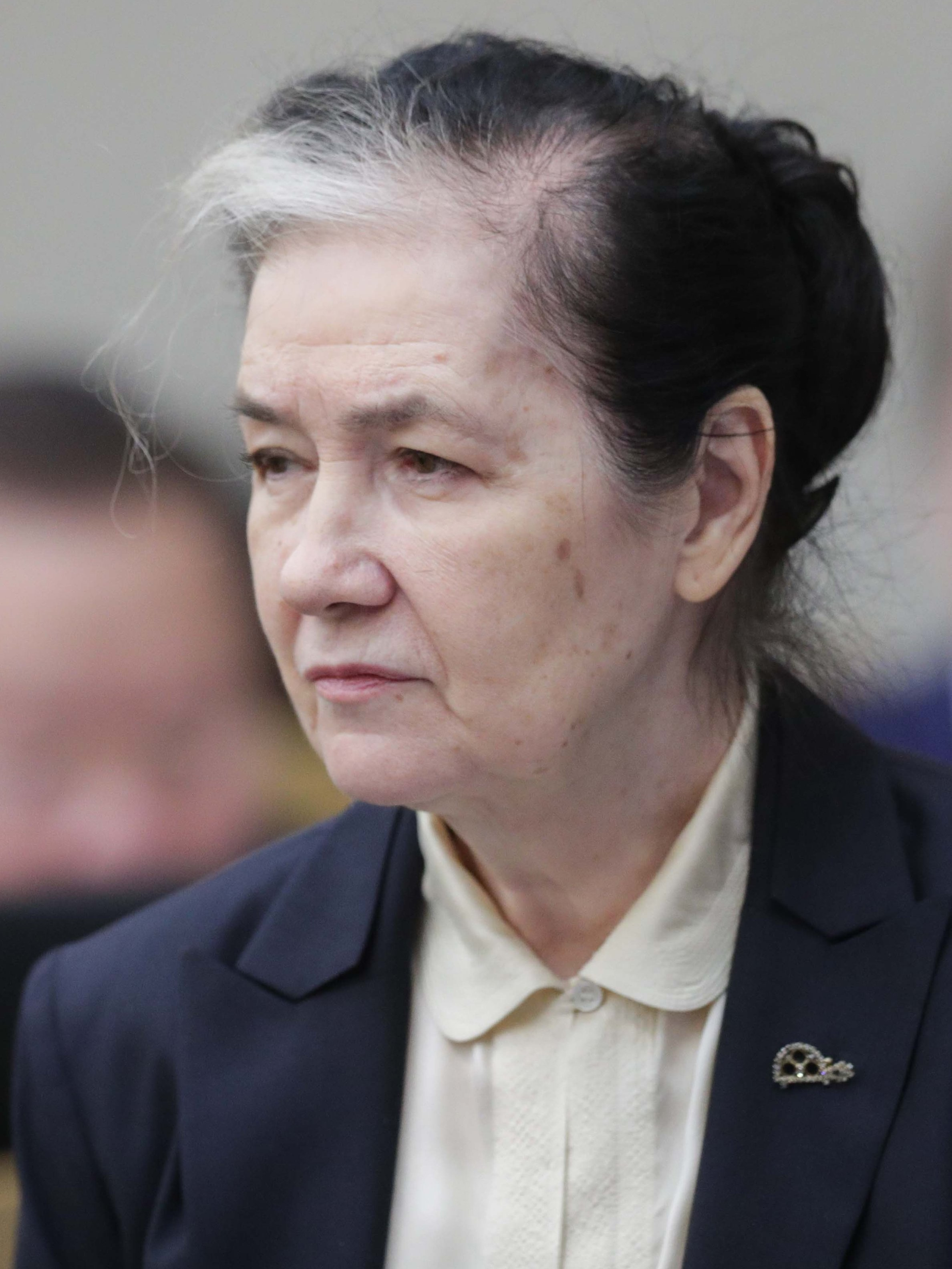
- Khovanskaya in 2017

Member of the State Duma for Moscow
- Incumbent
- Assumed office 5 October 2016
- Preceded by: constituency re-established
- Constituency: Leningradsky (No. 198)
- In office 29 December 2003 – 24 December 2007
- Preceded by: Vladimir Lysenko
- Succeeded by: ’’constituencies abolished’’
- Constituency: Northern Moscow (No. 194) (Note: renamed and renumbered to Leningradsky (No. 198) in 2016)

Member of the State Duma (Party List Seat)
- In office 24 December 2007 – 5 October 2016

Personal details
- Born: August 23, 1943 (age 82) Moscow, RSFSR, USSR
- Party: Yabloko (1997—2007); A Just Russia (since 2007)
- Education: Moscow Engineering Physics Institute; Academic Law Institute

Galina Petrovna Khovanskaya (Russian: Галина Петровна Хованская; born August 23, 1943, Moscow, RSFSR, USSR) is a Russian politician, deputy of the State Duma (since the 2003 legislative election).

In 1996 she graduated from the Academic Law University at the Institute of State and Law of RAS.

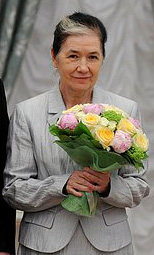
Galina Khovanskaya, 2014

== Family ==
Galina Khovanskaya's parents were teachers at MSU. Her father died in the Great Patriotic War in 1945. Her husband is physicist and she has a daughter and two grandchildren.

== Awards and honours ==
- Medal Defender of a Free Russia (1993)
- Person of the Year 2013
- Order of Honour (2014)
