= Koptevo District =

- District
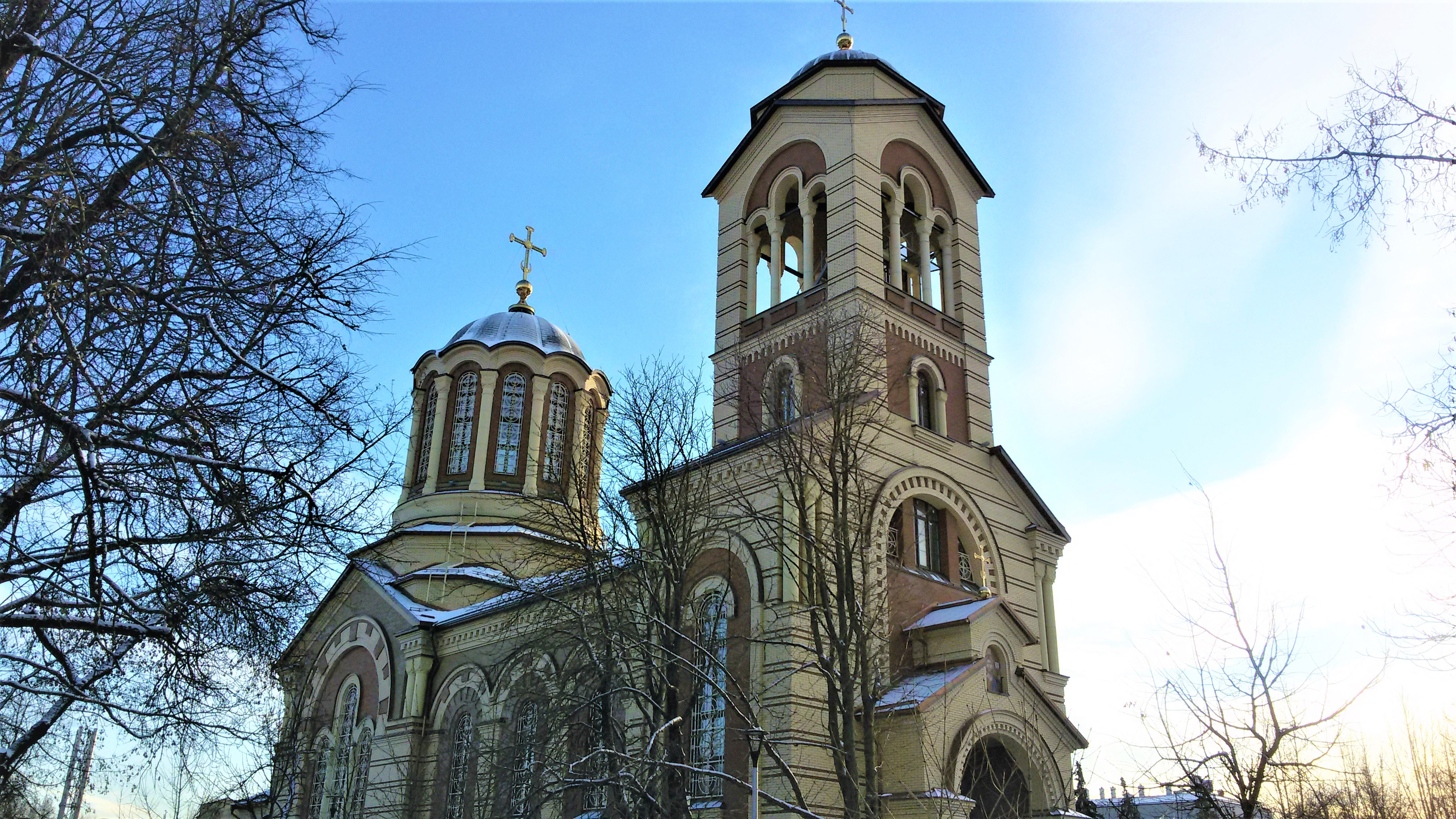
- Koptevo District, Church

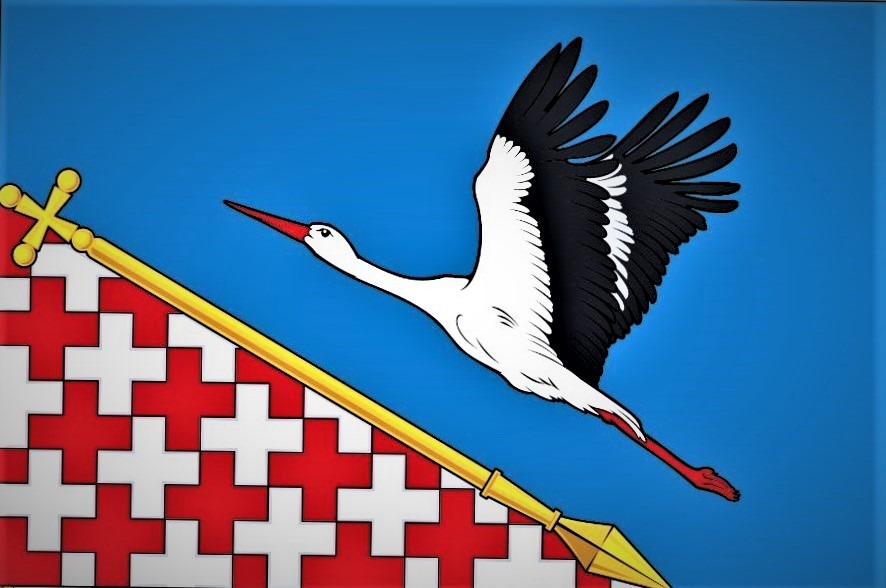
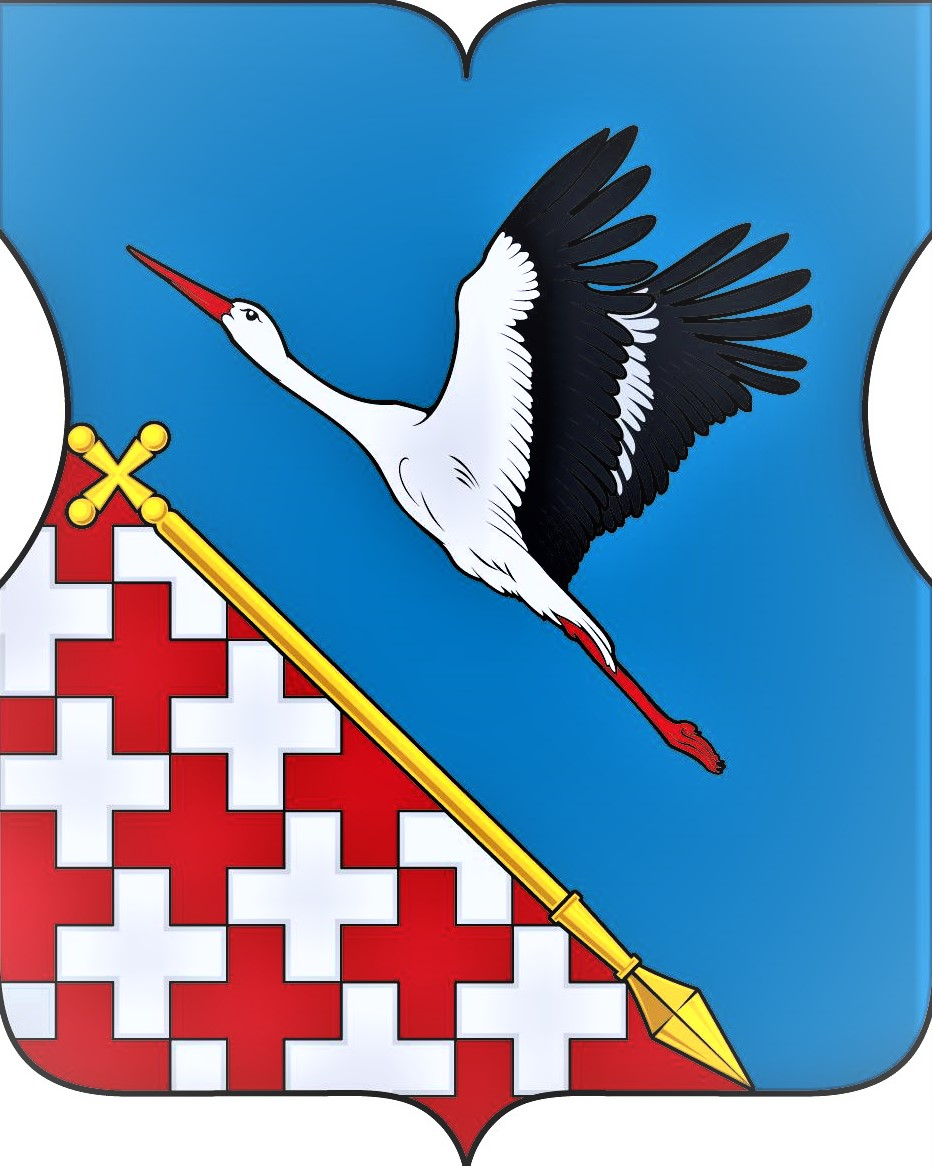
- Flag Coat of arms
- Location of Koptevo District on the map of Moscow
- Coordinates: 55°50′00″N 37°31′08″E
- Country: Russia
- Federal subject: Moscow

Area
  - Total: 5.08 km^{2} (1.96 sq mi)

Population
  - Estimate (2017): 100,642
- Time zone: UTC+
- OKTMO ID: 45341000
- Website: http://koptevo.mos.ru/

Koptevo (Russian: райо́н Кóптево) is a neighbourhood and an administrative district in the Northern Administrative Okrug, in Moscow, Russia adjacent to the Timiryazev Academy Park and its Academic Pond and covering an area of 5.08 square kilometers (1.96 sq mi). Its population was 100,642 in 2021. Today it is a green and quiet residential neighbourhood with apartment blocks built in 1930-1970, that also houses a number of faculties of Moscow universities as well as certain specialized medical clinics.

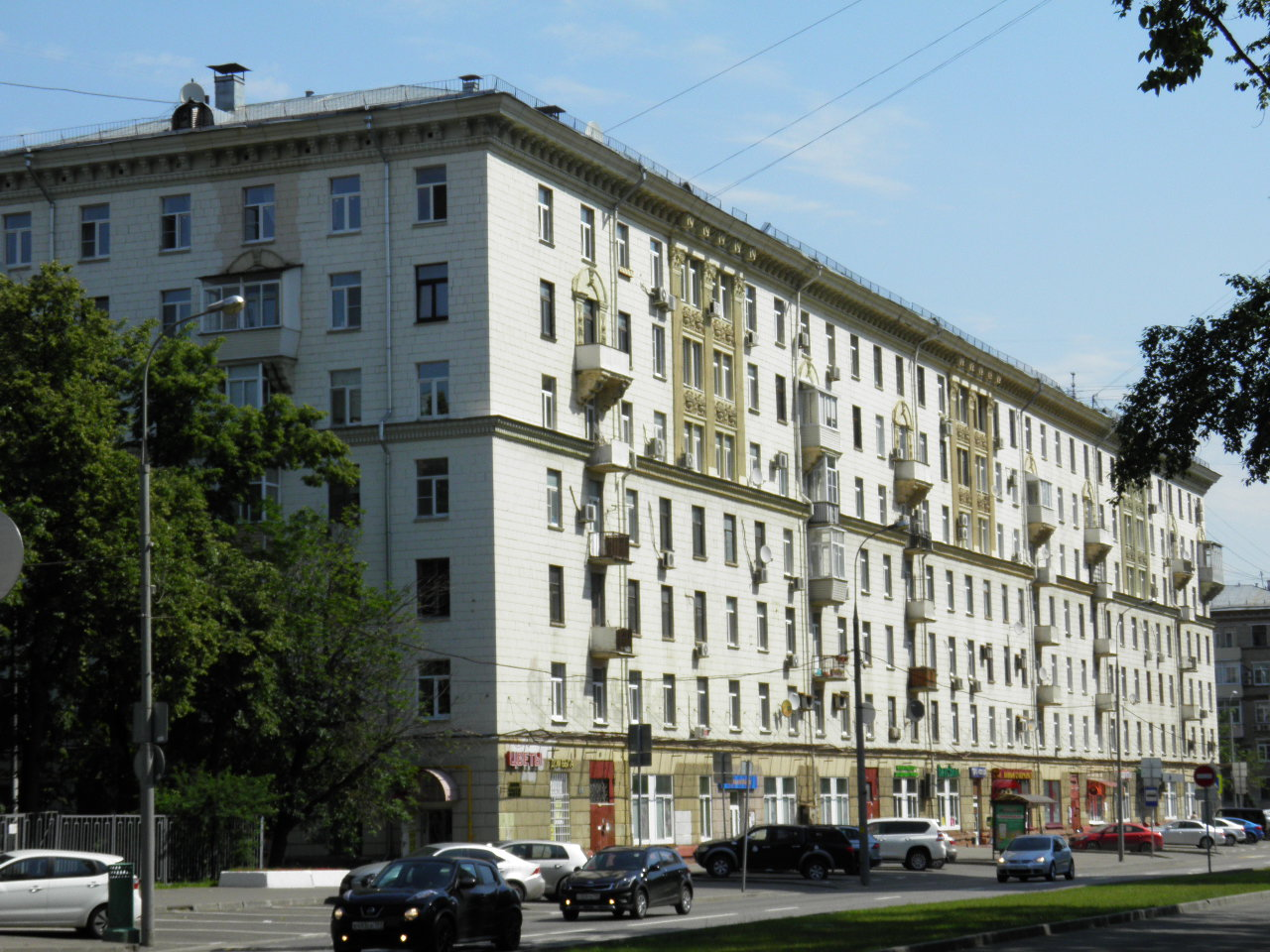
Koptevo district

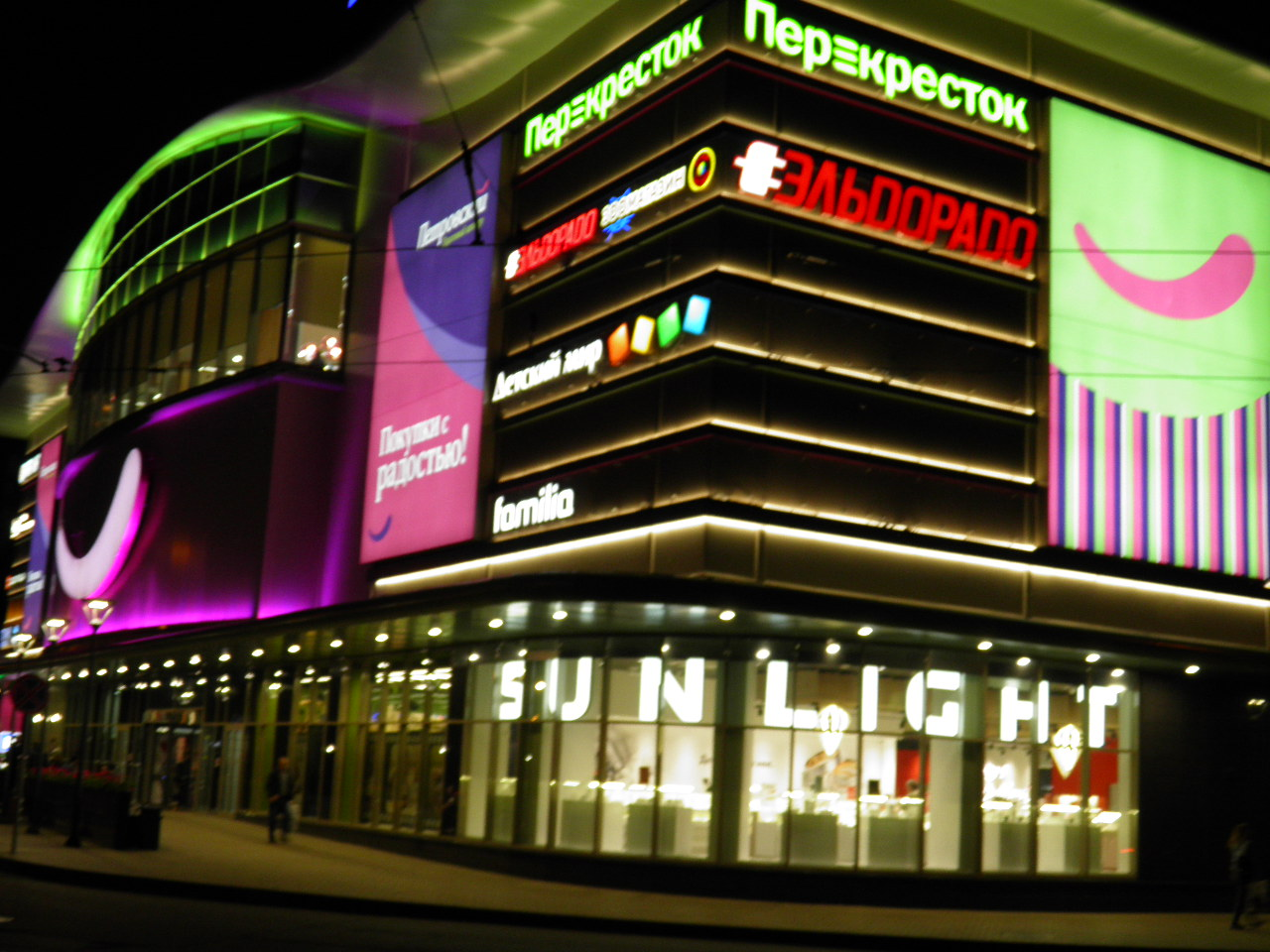
Koptevo district

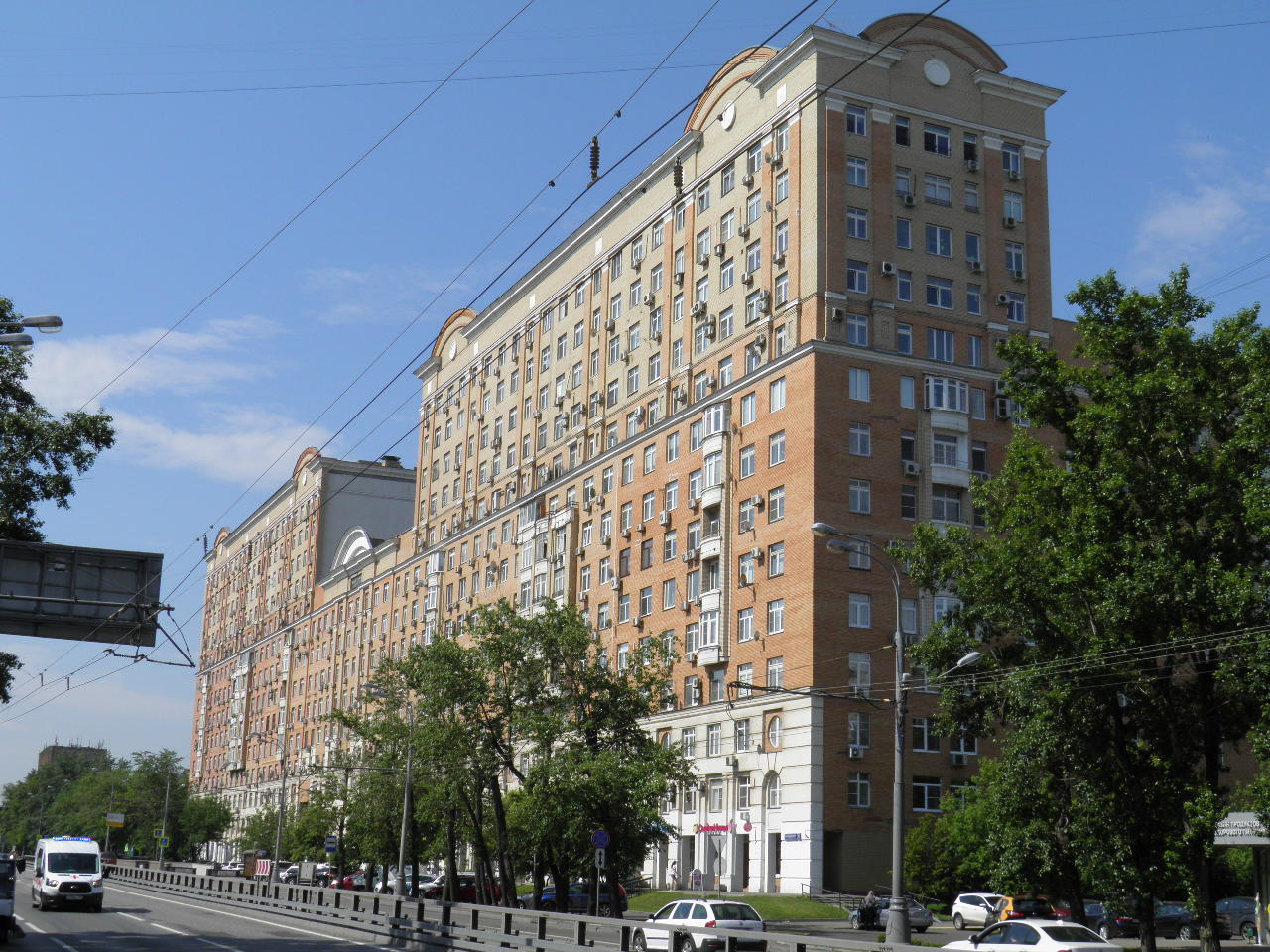
Koptevo district, main street

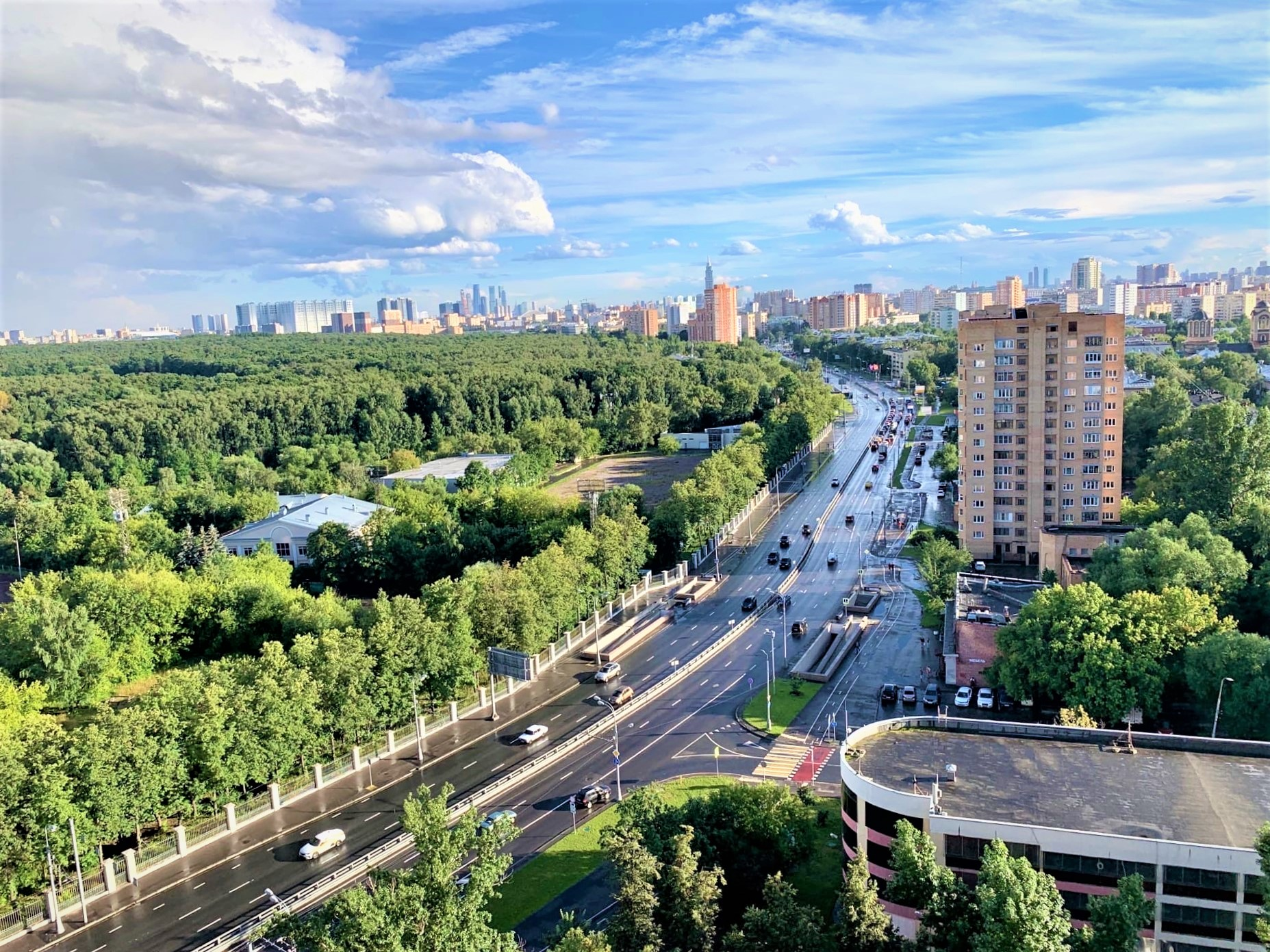
Koptevo and the adjacent Timiryazev park

== History ==
The area's history goes back to 16th century and today encompasses historical areas of Koptevo-Georgievskoye, Likhobory and a part of Mikhalkovo.

== Shopping ==
The main shopping areas are Mikhalkovskaya Street and Novopetrovskaya Street, which are the oldest roads in this neighbourhood starting from the 18th century - "Mikhalkovskoye Drive" and "The Road to the Petrovsky Academy". There are shopping centers "Petrovsky" and "Rassvet". Koptevsky market founded in 1949 is located at 24 Koptevskaya Street and retains its profile of the market for farmers' products.

== See also ==
- Administrative divisions of Moscow
