= Vostochnoye Degunino District =

- District
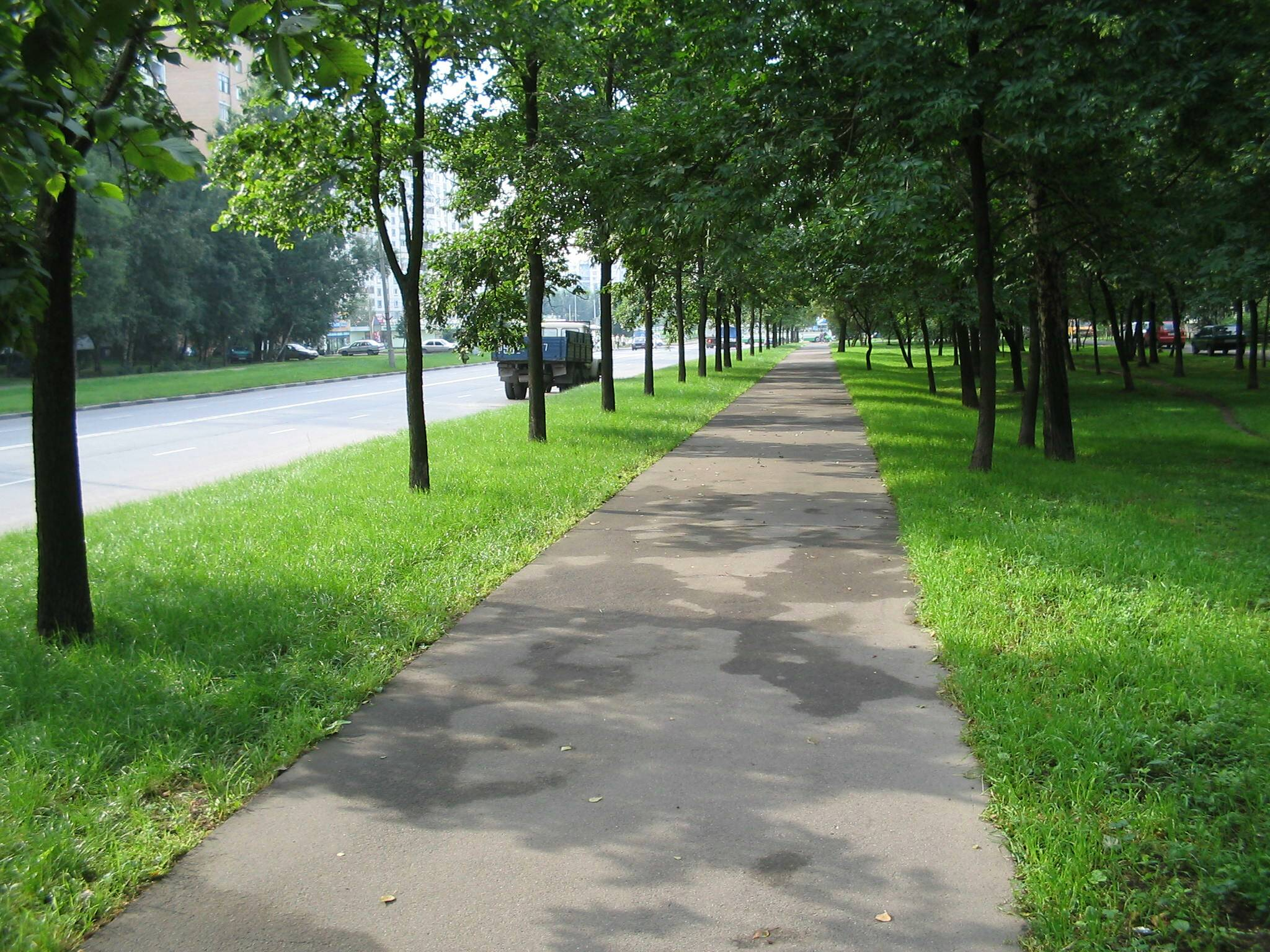
- Street view, Dubninskaya, Vostochnoye Degunino District

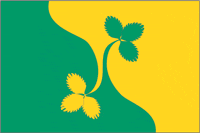
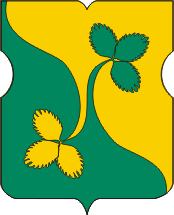
- Flag Coat of arms
- Location of Vostochnoye Degunino District on the map of Moscow
- Coordinates: 55°53′N 37°34′E
- Country: Russia
- Federal subject: Moscow

Area
  - Total: 3.77 km^{2} (1.46 sq mi)

Population
  - Estimate (2017): 95,700
- Time zone: UTC+
- OKTMO ID: 45337000
- Website: http://vost-degunino.mos.ru/

Vostochnoye Degunino District (Russian: Восточное Дегунино - Eastern Degunino) is an administrative district (raion) of Northern Administrative Okrug, and one of the 125 raions of Moscow, Russia. The area of the district is 3.77 square kilometers (1.46 sq mi). Population: 95,700 (2017 est.).

== See also ==
- Administrative divisions of Moscow
