= Begovoy District =

- District
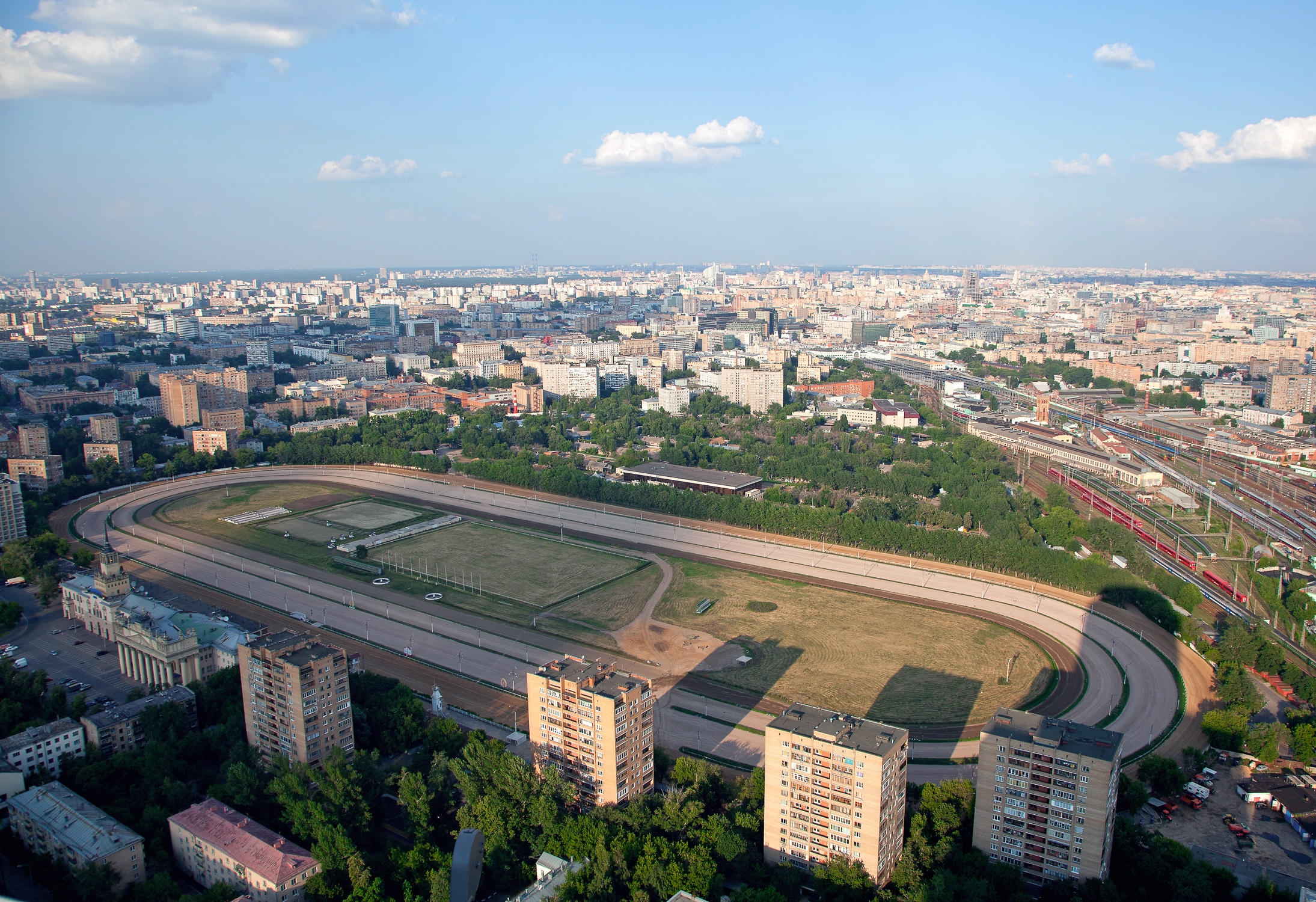
- Hippodrome, Begovoy District, Moscow

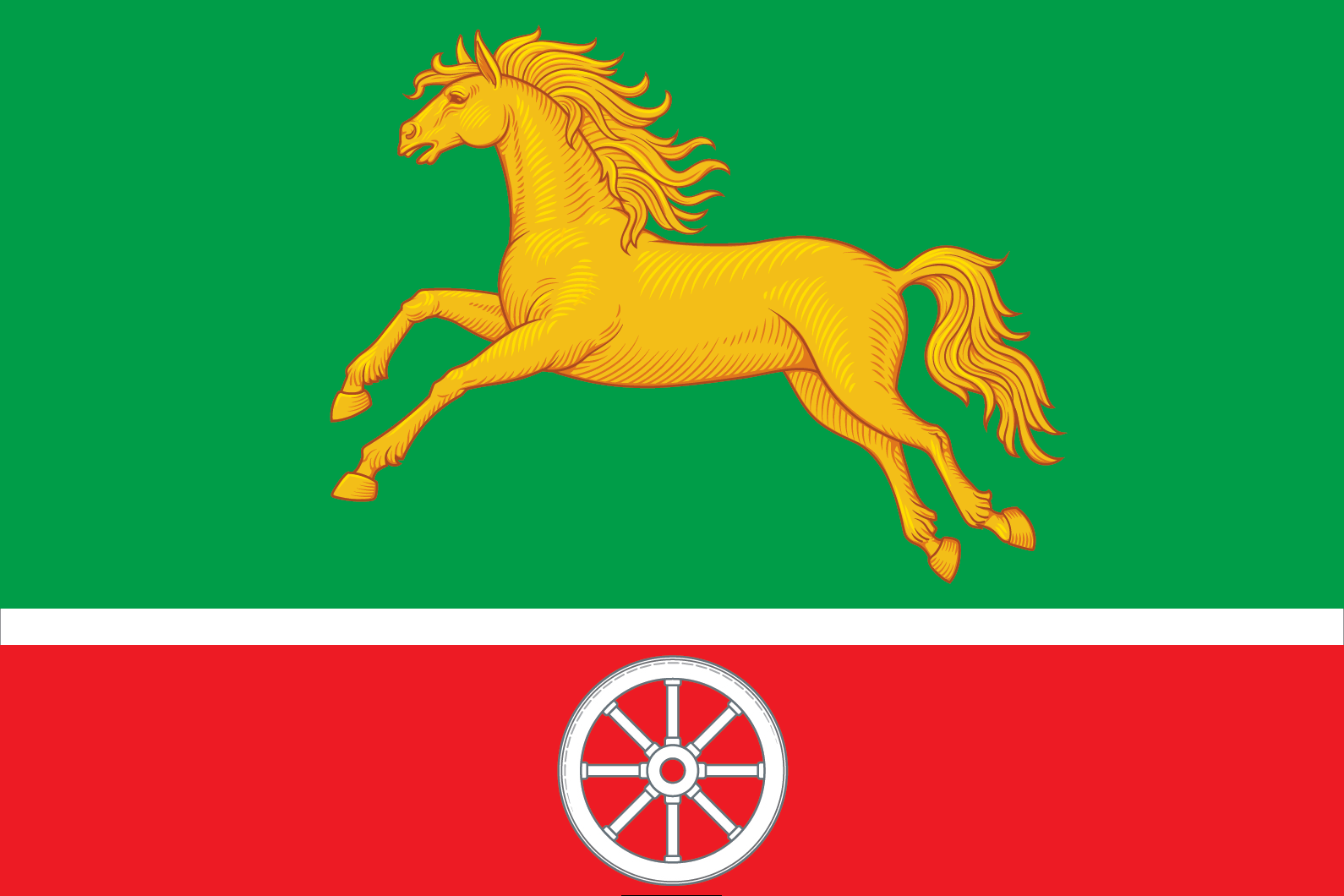
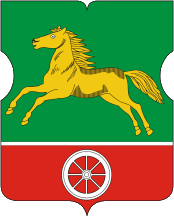
- Flag Coat of arms
- Location of Begovoy District on the map of Moscow
- Coordinates: 55°47′12″N 37°34′32″E
- Country: Russia
- Federal subject: Moscow

Area
  - Total: 4.18 km^{2} (1.61 sq mi)

Population
  - Estimate (2017): 37,900
- Time zone: UTC+
- OKTMO ID: 45334000
- Website: http://begovoy.mos.ru/

Begovoy District (Russian: Райо́н Бегово́й) is an administrative district (raion) of Northern Administrative Okrug, and one of the 125 raions of Moscow, Russia. The area of the district is 4.18 square kilometers (1.61 sq mi). Population: 37,900 (2017 est.)

== Economy ==
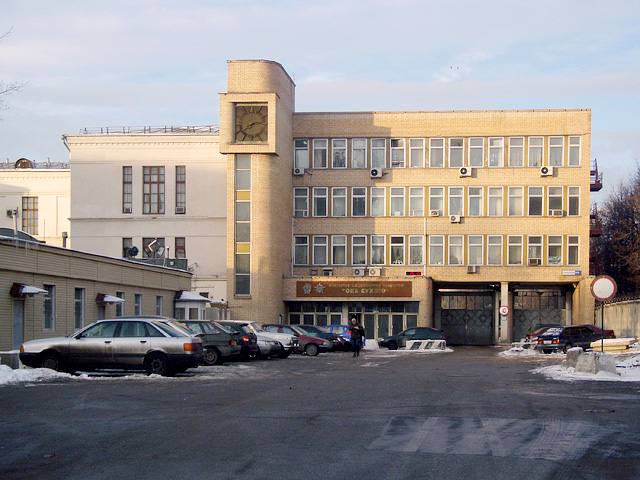
Sukhoi head office

The aviation companies Mikoyan (MiG) and Sukhoi have their head offices in the Begovoy District. There are factories such as Rumyantsev MPO, Znamya Truda (MiG), Duks and Temp.

== See also ==
- Administrative divisions of Moscow
