= Dmitrovsky District, Moscow =

Dmitrovsky District Дмитровский район (Russian)
- District
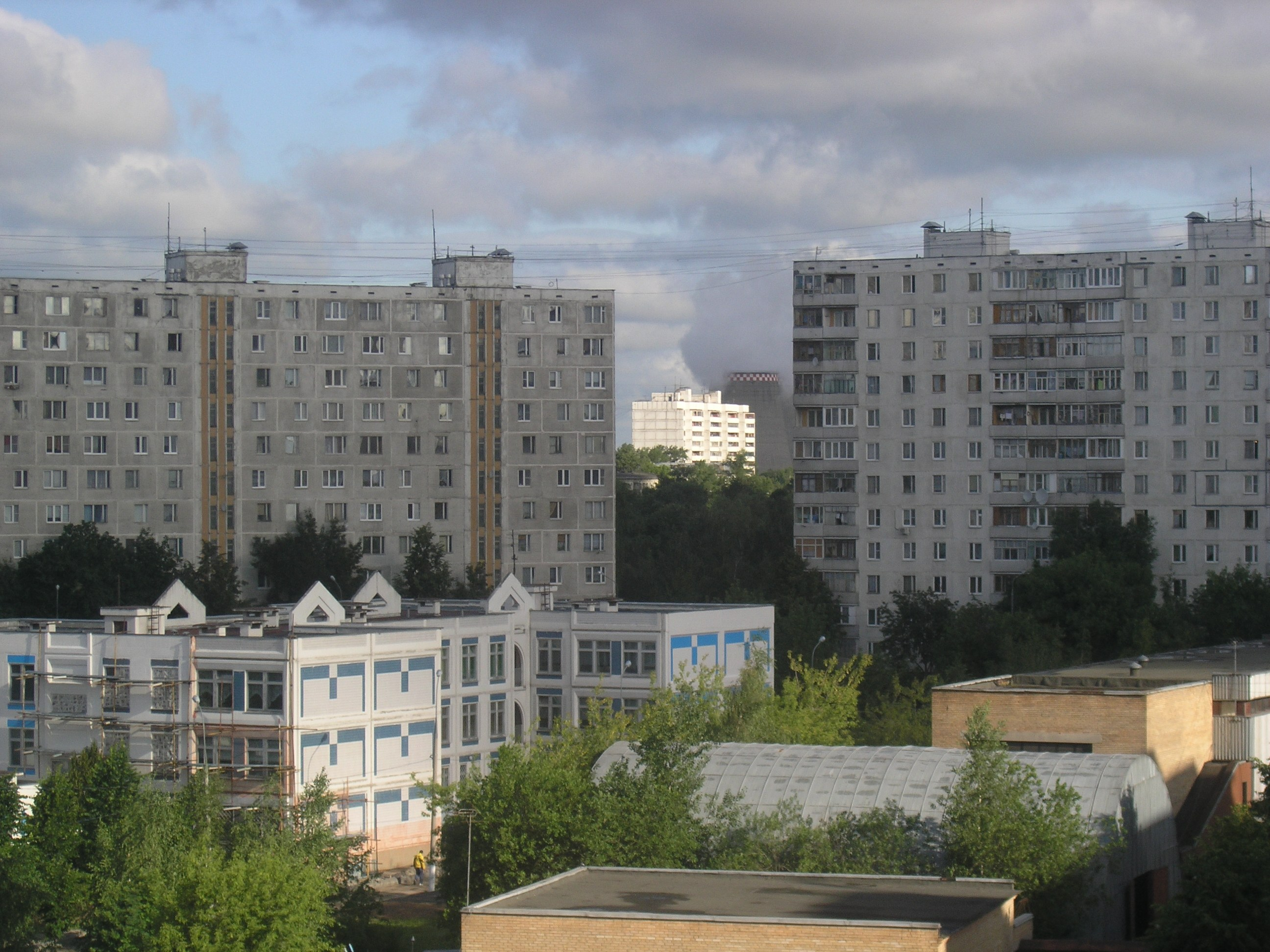
- In Dmitrovsky District

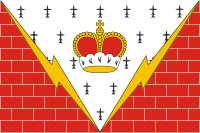
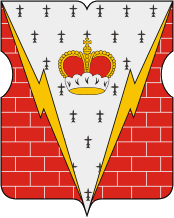
- Flag Coat of arms
- Location of Dmitrovsky District (red) in Moscow (pre-2012 map)
- Coordinates: 55°53′19″N 37°31′25″E
- Country: Russia
- Federal subject: federal city of Moscow

Area
  - Total: 6.8397 km^{2} (2.6408 sq mi)

Population (2010 Census)
  - Total: 87,779
  - Density: 12,834/km^{2} (33,239/sq mi)

Municipal structure
  - Municipally incorporated as: Dmitrovsky Municipal Okrug
- Time zone: UTC+
- OKTMO ID: 45339000
- Website: http://dmitrovskiy.mos.ru

Population of Dmitrovsky District
- 2010 Census: 87,779
- 2002 Census: 88,931

Dmitrovsky District (Russian: Дми́тровский райо́н) is an administrative district (raion), one of the sixteen in Northern Administrative Okrug of the federal city of Moscow, Russia. The area of the district is 6.8397 square kilometres (2.6408 mi^{2}). As of the 2010 Census, the total population of the district was 87,779.

== Municipal status ==
As a municipal division, it is incorporated as Dmitrovsky Municipal Okrug.
