= Nikolai Markovnikov =

Russian architect

- Николай Владимирович Марковников
- Born: 1869
- Died: 1942 (aged 72–73); Tashkent, Uzbek SSR
- Citizenship: Soviet
- Occupations: Architect, lecturer
- Buildings: Buildings of the Little Ring of the Moscow Railway
- Projects: Restoration of the Kremlin, Sokol Settlement

Nikolai Vladimirovich Markovnikov, also spelled Morkovnikov (Russian: Николай Владимирович Марковников (Морковников)) (1869, Kazan - 1942, location of death unknown) was an architect and archaeologist, chief architect of the Moscow Kremlin in 1914–1919.

Nikolai Markovnikov attended the Imperial Academy of Arts in 1888–1892. He founded the very first technical and construction engineering courses for women in 1905-1916 and Department of Architecture at the Moscow Polytechnical Institute for Women. In 1914, Nikolai Markovnikov was appointed chief architect of the Moscow Kremlin and remained on this post until 1919. He supervised the restoration of the walls and towers of the Kremlin and then the re-equipping of the governmental establishments in 1918. Nikolai Markovnikov designed and built the Small Circular Railway in 1903-1910 (Малая Окружная железная дорога, today known as the Little Ring of the Moscow Railway) and the Sokol settlement in a Moscow neighbourhood.
