= Khoroshyovsky District =

Khoroshyovsky District Хорошёвский район (Russian)
- District
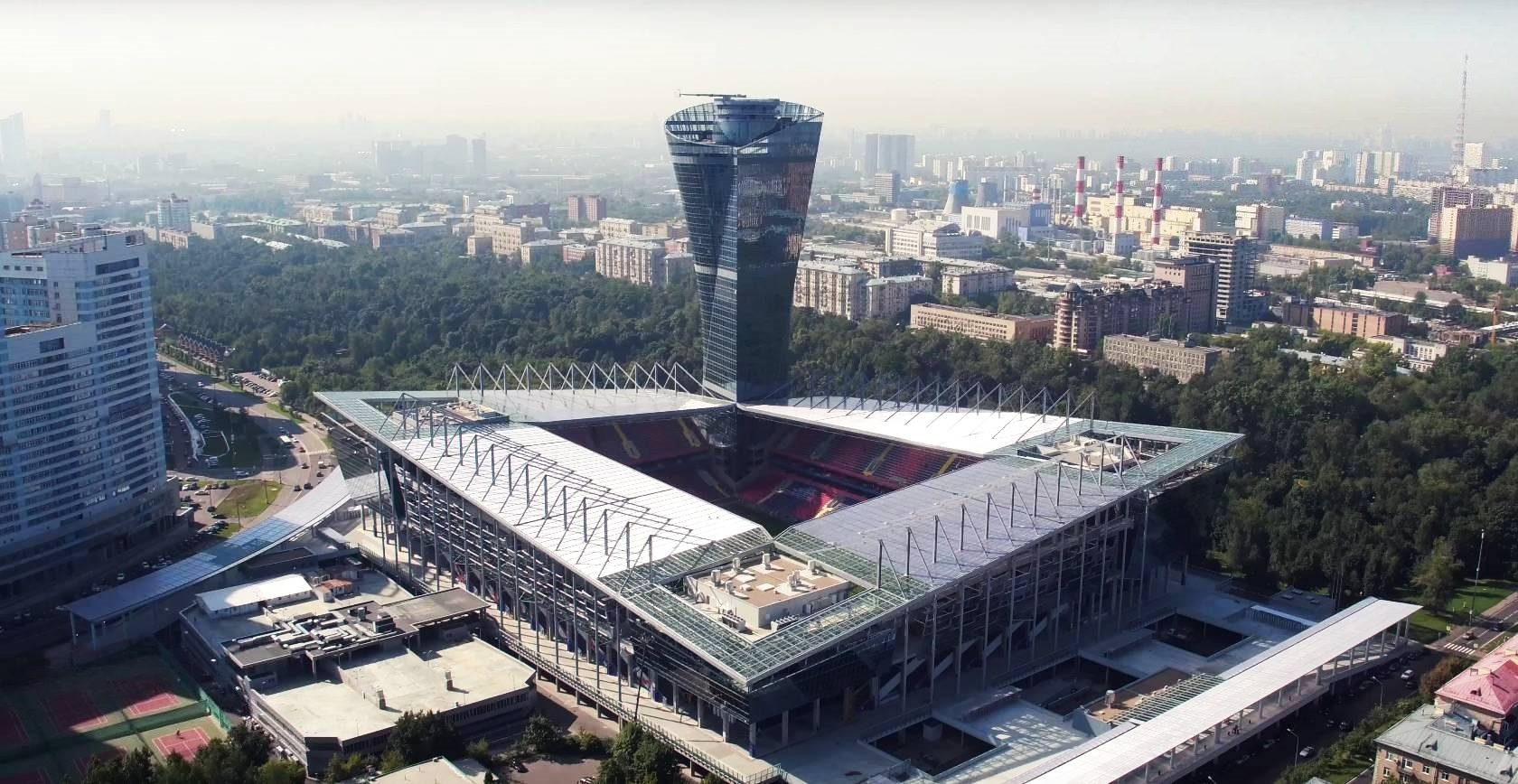
- Arena CSKA

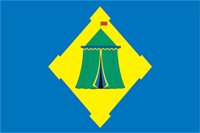
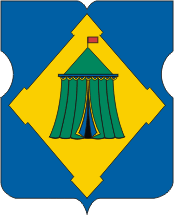
- Flag Coat of arms
- Location of Khoroshyovsky District on the map of Moscow
- Coordinates: 55°47′18″N 37°31′46″E
- Country: Russia
- Federal subject: Moscow

Area
  - Total: 8.54 km^{2} (3.30 sq mi)

Population
  - Estimate (2017): 56,600
- Time zone: UTC+
- OKTMO ID: 45348000
- Website: http://khoroshevskiy.mos.ru/

Khoroshyovsky District (Russian: Хорошёвский райо́н) is an administrative district (raion) of Northern Administrative Okrug, and one of the 125 raions of Moscow, Russia. It is 6 kilometers northwest of the Moscow city center. Central to the district is Khodynka Field, which, as an open space in the northwest of Moscow was long the site of agriculture, battles, celebrations and the first airfield in Russia. In recent years the district has seen large scale developments, including the Megasport Sports Palace, VEB Arena, the Aviapark shopping center, and the Triumph Palace highrise residential building. The area of the district is 8.54 square kilometers (3.30 sq mi). Population: 56,600 (2017 est.)

== History ==
The district's center, the Khodynka Field, takes its name from the now-filled Khodynka River, a former left tributary of the Moscow River just to the south. During the Time of Troubles in the early 1600s, the field was the site of a battle between the forces of Tsar Vasili IV and those of False Dmitry II. Throughout the 19th century, the field was the site of public celebrations, ending tragically in 1896 when a stampede during festivities for the coronation of Tsar Nicholas II killed 1,389 people. In 1910, the first airplane flight in Russia occurred on the field, and Khodynka Aerodrome was established.

The airfield attracted a variety aerospace industry to the district, including the Sukhoi Design Bureau and the Ilyushin Aviation Complex. The presence of open space in recent years has led to the development of major public facilities, such as the VEB multi-use arena ("Arena CSKA"), the Megasport Sport Palace (also known as the Ice Sports Palace on Khondynka Field), and Aviapark, which as of 2014 was the largest shopping center in Europe. The district is also the home of the Triumph Palace, which at 57 stories is the tallest apartment building in Europe.

== See also ==
- Administrative divisions of Moscow
