= Beskudnikovsky District =

- District
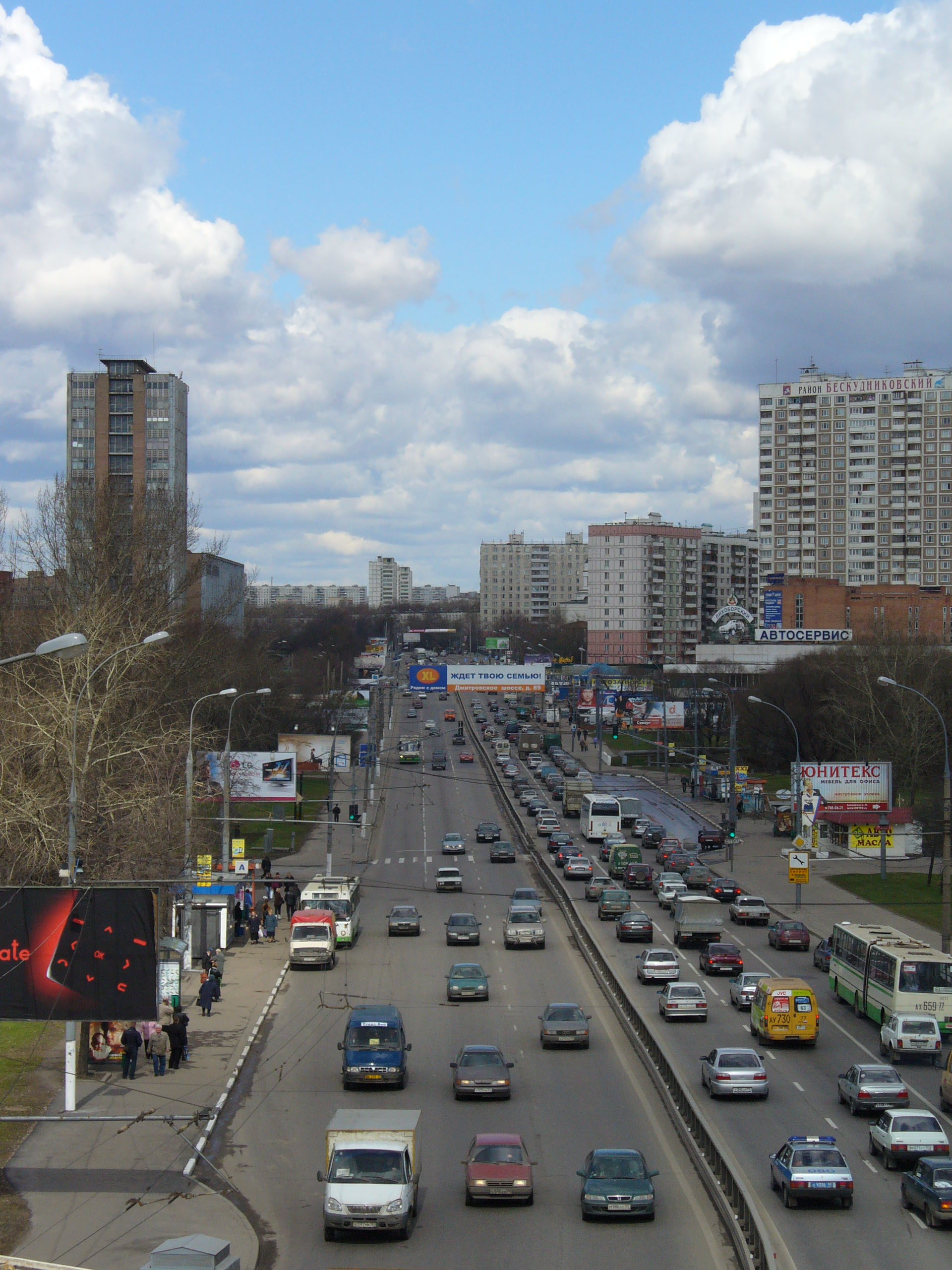
- Beskudnikovsky District, Moscow

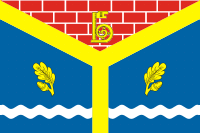
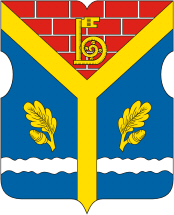
- Flag Coat of arms
- Location of Beskudnikovsky District on the map of Moscow
- Coordinates: 55°51′55″N 37°33′54″E
- Country: Russia
- Federal subject: Moscow

Area
  - Total: 3.27 km^{2} (1.26 sq mi)

Population
  - Estimate (2017): 64,000
- Time zone: UTC+
- OKTMO ID: 45335000
- Website: http://beskudnikovo.mos.ru/

Beskudnikovsky District is an administrative district (raion) of Northern Administrative Okrug, and one of the 125 raions of Moscow, Russia. The district is about 12 km north of Central Moscow, and has an area of 3.27 square kilometers (1.26 sq mi). Population: 64,000 (2017 est.)

== See also ==
- Administrative divisions of Moscow
