= Northern Administrative Okrug =

Northern Administrative Okrug Северный административный округ
- Administrative okrug of Moscow
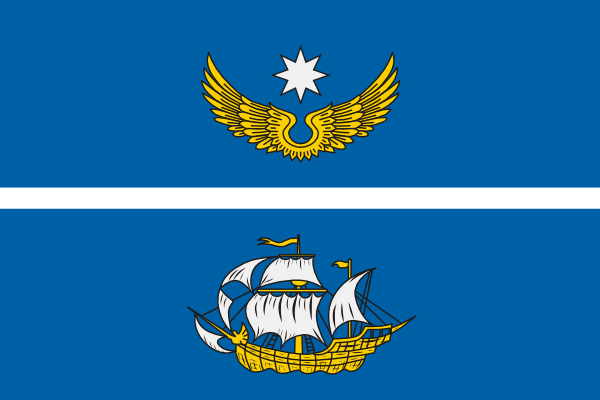
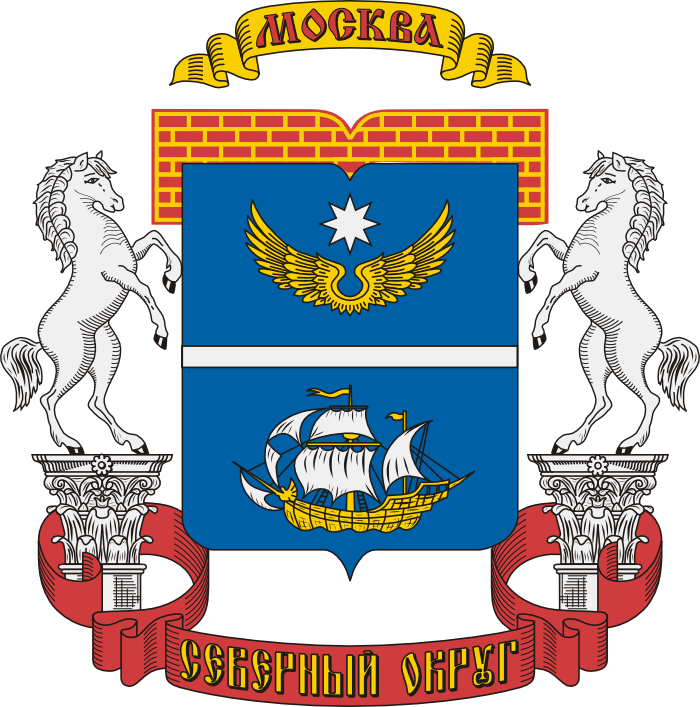
- Flag Coat of arms
- Northern Administrative Okrug in Moscow
- Coordinates: 55°50′N 37°31′E
- Country: Russia
- Federal city: Moscow
- Established: 1991
- Districts: 16

Government
  - Prefect: Gadzhimurad Izutdinov

Area
  - Total: 109.9 km^{2} (42.4 sq mi)

Population (2010 Census)
  - Total: 1,100,974
- Website: https://sao.mos.ru/

The Northern Administrative Okrug (Russian: Се́верный администрати́вный о́круг, romanized: Severny administrativny okrug), or Severny Administrative Okrug, is one of the twelve high-level territorial divisions (administrative okrugs) of the federal city of Moscow, Russia. As of the 2010 Census, its population was 1,100,974, down from 1,112,846 recorded during the 2002 Census.

== Territorial divisions ==
The administrative okrug comprises the following sixteen districts:

- Aeroport
- Begovoy
- Beskudnikovsky
- Dmitrovsky
- Golovinsky
- Khovrino
- Khoroshyovsky
- Koptevo
- Levoberezhny
- Molzhaninovsky
- Savyolovsky
- Sokol
- Timiryazevsky
- Vostochnoye Degunino
- Voykovsky
- Zapadnoye Degunino

Vodny Stadion—a territorial unit with special status—used to be a part of the administrative okrug as well.

== Economy ==
Over a thousand medium-sized and large businesses and almost eighteen thousand small businesses operate in Northern Administrative Okrug. They include construction material, engineering, food production, light industry, jewelry design, and printing operations.

Offices of many of Russia's aviation companies are housed in the administrative okrug. The aviation companies Irkut, Ilyushin, and Yakovlev have their head offices in Aeroport District. The aviation companies Mikoyan (MiG) and Sukhoi have their head offices in Begovoy District. The administrative okrug also houses the Dementyev Moscow Aviation Plant and the Rumyantsev Moscow Aviation Plant. Nordwind Airlines has its head office within Sheremetyevo International Airport in Molzhaninovsky District.

== Education ==
The New Humanitarian School, a private school, is located in Aeroport District.

== Coat of arms ==
The narrow silver belt symbolizes the Moscow Canal, which passes through the territory of the administrative okrug. The two golden wings symbolize air traffic and the Sheremetyevo International Airport. The silver eight-pointed star represents Polaris and points to the northern location of the administrative okrug in Moscow. The gold and silver sails of the ship symbolize the river transport. The silver horses represent the racetrack. Finally, the silver Corinthian style columns represent the porticos of the Central Moscow Hippodrome.

== Localities ==
- Sokol
