= Lutosławski (surname) =

Lutosławski (feminine: Lutosławska; plural: Lutosławscy) is a Polish surname. Notable people include:

- Kazimierz Lutosławski (1880–1924), Polish physician, priest and Polish Scouting founder and activist, brother of Marian and father of Witold
- Marian Lutosławski (1871–1918), Polish mechanical engineer and inventor, brother of Kazimierz and uncle of Witold
- Wincenty Lutosławski (1863–1954), Polish philosopher and author
- Witold Lutosławski (1913–1994), Polish composer and conductor, son of Kazimierz and nephew of Marian
