= Sofía Casanova =

Spanish poet, novelist and journalist

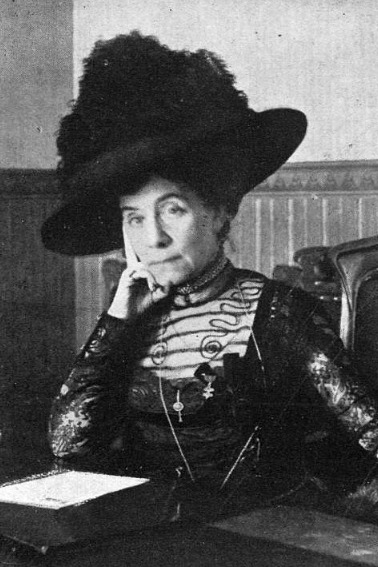
- Sofía Casanova, 1910s
- Born: Sofía Guadalupe Pérez Casanova; 30 September 1861; Almeiras, A Coruña, Kingdom of Spain
- Died: 16 January 1958 (aged 96); Poznań, Polish People's Republic
- Occupations: Journalist, writer
- Organization: Royal Galician Academy
- Spouse: Wincenty Lutosławski
- Awards: Grand Cross of the Civil Order of Beneficence

Sofía Casanova (30 September 1861 – 16 January 1958) (formally in Spanish: Sofía Guadalupe Pérez Casanova, Polish: Zofia Casanova-Lutosławska) was a poet, novelist, and journalist, the first Spanish woman to become a permanent correspondent in a foreign country and a war correspondent. She was a cultured woman, well known in the literary circles of the time. In her work she highlighted the human aspect of her chronicles as a correspondent for the newspaper ABC in Poland and Russia, where she reported on the suffering of the civilian population during the wars she covered, adding literary value. Her activity throughout Europe allowed her to experience events such as the First World War, the fall of Czarist Russia, the emergence of the Bolshevik regime, and the Second World War. She wrote for newspapers such as ABC, La Época, El Liberal, and El Imparcial, for the magazine Galicia, for other Galician publications, and for the international press, such as the Gazeta Polska and the New York Times. Of Catholic and monarchical convictions in the Spanish Civil War, she joined the Francoist ranks. Her long life allowed her to leave behind a broad collection of writings covering all literary genres.

== Family and youth ==
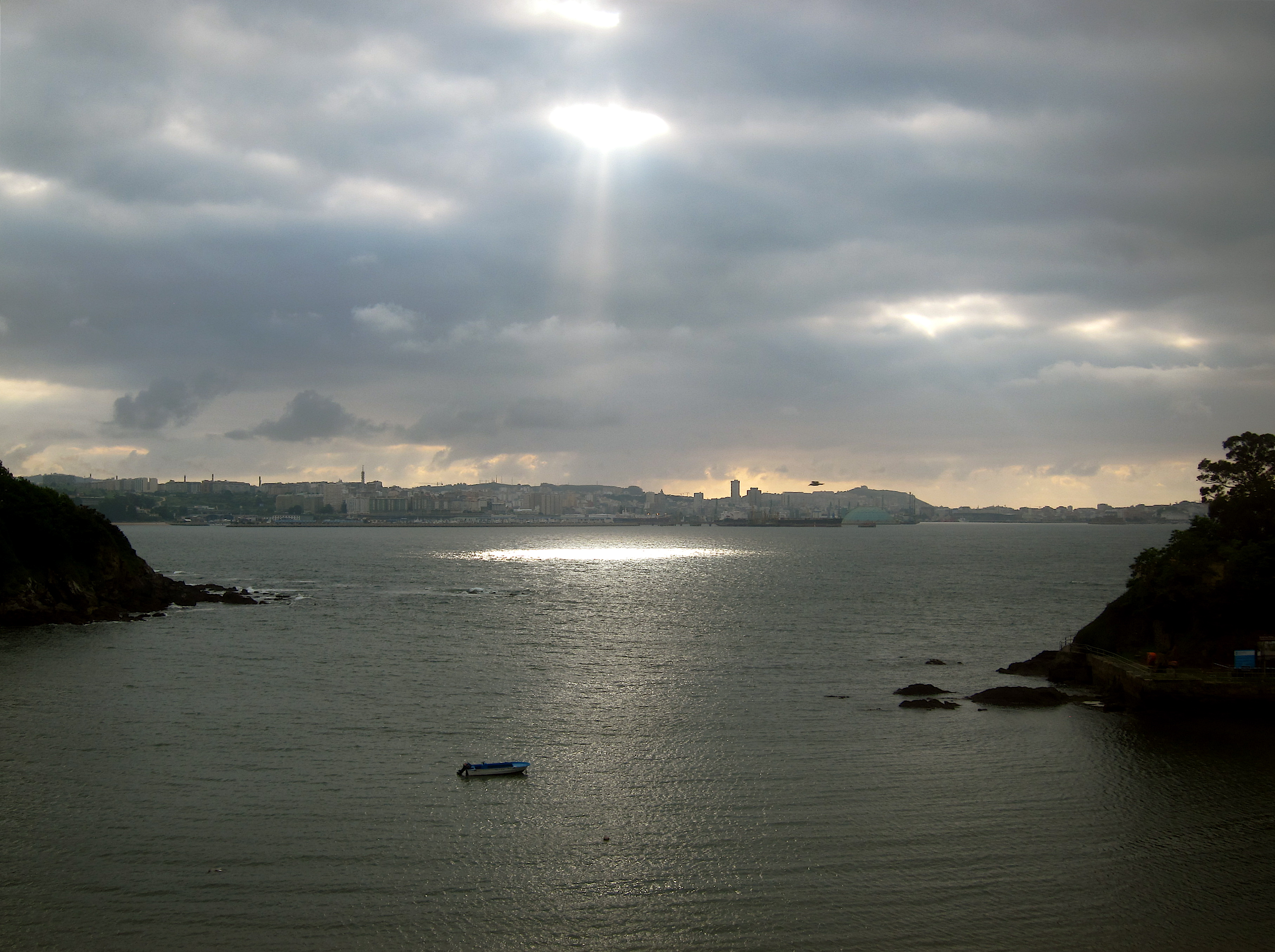
La Coruña, present view

Casanova descended from a multinational family. Her paternal grandfather, Vicente Pérez Losada, was Portuguese by birth; he married a Madrid girl, herself daughter to a family born in Mexico but of Basque origin. They settled in Orense and this is where Casanova's father, Vicente Pérez Eguía, was born; he worked as a lithographer. Casanova's maternal grandfather, Juan Bautista Casanova Pla Canela, was from Ferrol, but he spent many years in navy service in Spanish possessions in Nueva España. He married a girl of Dutch descent from New Orleans; both settled in La Coruña shortly before the birth of their daughter, Rosa Casanova Estomper. Casanova was an illegitimate child, a rather unusual and scandalous case in Spain and Galicia at the time. Her father married her mother in January 1863; according to various sources the couple had either one or two more children. In 1865 Vicente Pérez abandoned his family and moved to Madrid; none of the sources consulted provides any details on his occupation or private life. Few years later he disappeared. According to some authors he left Spain for America; other biographers have doubts and note that the ship he allegedly had boarded sunk on the Atlantic, yet he was not on the passenger list; At that time he was already a fugitive; in 1871 he was wanted by the Madrid judiciary for embezzlement and fraud. One more scholar claims that by the mid-1880s he was already dead.

The abandoned mother and her children stayed in A Coruña, supported financially by Juan Bautista Casanova. Casanova spent her childhood at the Pazo del Hombre in San Julián de Almeiras, in the A Coruña province, and began her studies at the local Doña Concha school. In 1873 the family – including her mother, brothers, and maternal grandparents – took up residence in Madrid. The first years in the capital were initially very hard for the young girl; unaccustomed to Castilian heat she was longing for Galician climate, and given financial misery of the family, she had to support the economy by giving lessons. Their standing improved upon receiving a heritage from Casanova's paternal family.

In Madrid, Casanova frequented the Conservatorio, where she began to study poetry and declamation. Her first poems were published when she was fifteen years old, in the Faro de Vigo. It was not she but her mother who sent them to the newspaper after finding them in her room. Casanova's talent for poetry was recognized in the most select literary circles that she frequented assiduously. She started to make friends in the Madrid literary world, above all with Blanca de los Ríos. She was noticed by Marquis of Valmar, who facilitated publications of her poems in the Madrid titles Telegrama, El Obrero, Flores y Pestas, Semana Literaria and Imparcial and in the Barcelona-based La Ilustración Ibérica; she was also publishing in the Galician Domingos del Faro and Folletín del Faro. In the early 1880s she has already earned her name as a promising, young poet.

== At the court of Alfonso XII ==
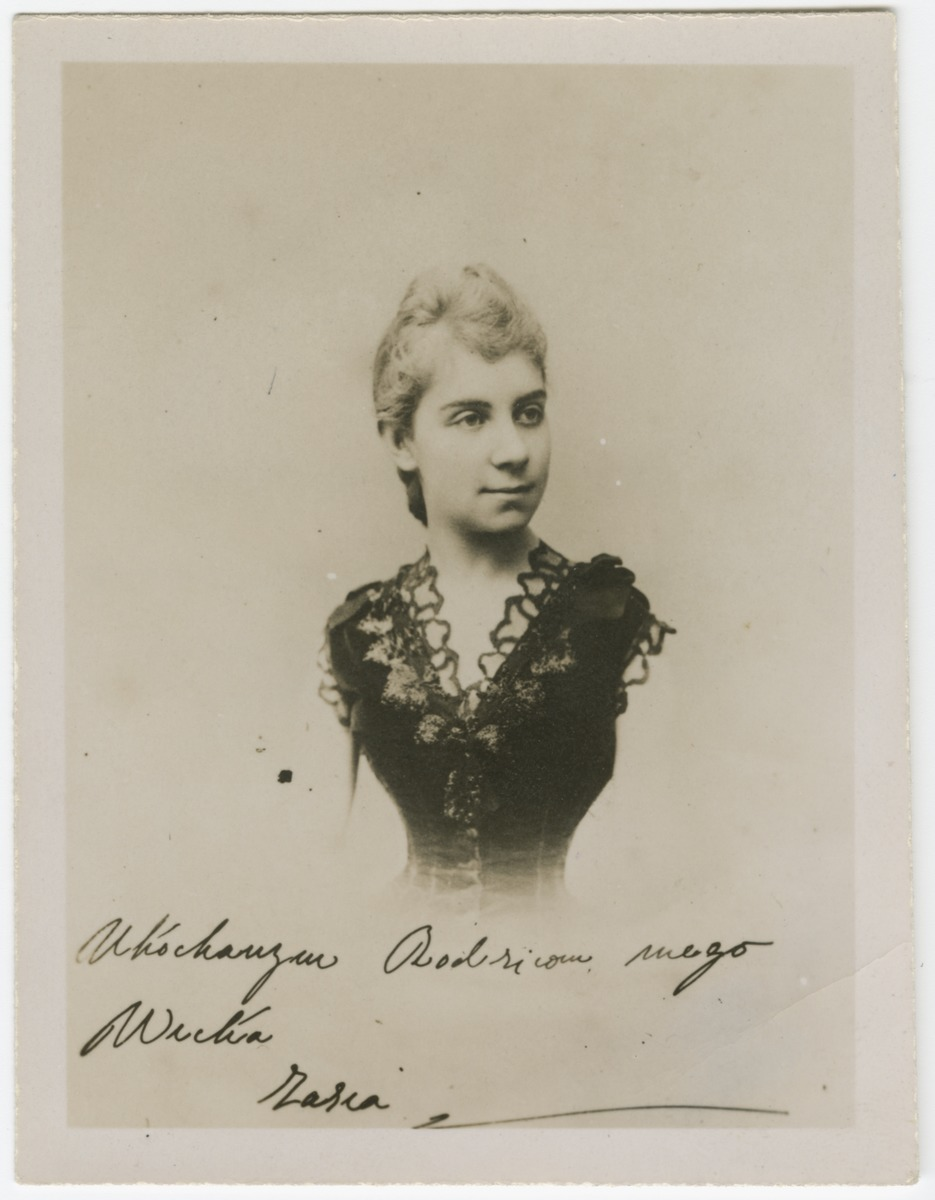
Casanova in her youth

Already by 1872, her poetry was presented during literary evenings at Teatro de Variedades; during the following few years she got used to stage appearances when reading her poems and it seems that in the late 1870s she was already moderately successful. In the early 1880s, she earned her name as a promising, young poet, praised as "poetisa de corazón". By that time she also began a career of an actress; between 1878 and 1882 she was noted as performing for Teatro Español or Teatro de Alhambra. She initially appeared in the press under her proper surname "Sofía Pérez Casanova"; in the early 1880s, she was referred to as "Sofía Casanova".

At an unspecified time, either in the late 1870s or in the early 1880s, Casanova became the protégé of Ramón de Campoamor, who in turn introduced her to the literary gatherings of Marquis of Valmar, and of Patricio Aguirre de Tejada, later Count of Andino, tutor of King Alfonso XII. At the literary evenings she maintained contact with intellectuals of the time, including Emilio Ferrari and Bernard Shaw. Among the women writers she knew were Concepción Jimeno Gil, her younger friend Blanca de los Ríos, Sofía Tartilán, Filomena Dato, and Emilia Pardo Bazán. She started to appear at the court, invited to recite great Spanish poetry but also to declaim her own works. Casanova was particularly appreciated by the king himself. One anecdote has it that even the prime minister Antonio Cánovas was kept waiting in the antechamber while Alfonso XII could have not brought himself to interrupt Casanova reciting poetry.

In 1885, Casanova published her debut volume, a collection of poetic pieces titled Poesias. The book was financed by the king himself; the set was prologued by Ricardo Blanco Asenjo, a poet and literary critic fairly popular at the time, working for a number of prestigious periodicals. Publication of her debut volume increased Casanova's popularity, and in 1885, some papers started to celebrate her as a poet with "espíritu inspirado y un rostro bello. La juventud y la gracia tejen en sus sienes, ornadas de rizos de oro, una corona de atractivos y encantos. La pobreza añádele uní aureola de irresis-tible simpatía" (roughly translates to "Inspired spirit and a beautiful face. Youth and grace weave at her temples, adorned with golden curls, a crown of attractions and charms. Poverty adds a halo of irresistible sympathy").

In these circles, in June 1886, Campoamor introduced her to a young Polish nobleman, later to become philosopher and professor, Wincenty Lutosławski, who had arrived in Madrid from France. Lutosławski became infatuated with Casanova almost immediately; the two corresponded for some four months before she declared having fallen in love with him as well. Though Lutosławski's parents remained highly skeptical about marrying a foreigner, he remained firm and the couple were married in the church of San Marcos on 19 March 1887. However, they signed a secret document, in which both consented to unilateral rupture should any of the parties wish to go his/her own way.

== Unhappy marriage ==
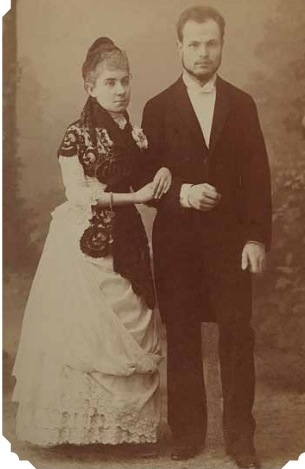
Lutosławski couple

After the wedding, the couple spent their honeymoon in Portugal. Later, they initially moved to Lutosławski's family estate in Drozdowo, where they were very pompously greeted by Casanova's in-laws. Initially, she communicated with her husband and his family only in French; it was only gradually that she was picking up more and more Polish. According to many accounts, she soon won the hearts and minds of all the Lutosławski family with her natural, cheerful, open and unassuming personality. Following a brief spell in Switzerland, where Lutosławski obtained his PhD title, they spent the next few years shuttling across Russia, as Lutosławski was either employed or was seeking employment in universities of Dorpat, Helsinki, Moscow and Kazan. They returned to Drozdowo in 1895 and lived there intermittently until 1899. By that time, they had already four children, all of them daughters: María, Izabela, Yadwiga and Halina, born between 1888 and 1897. Yadwiga died of dysentery in 1895, plunging Casanova into a severe depression. The couple and their family traveled to Galicia every summer, which allowed Casanova to maintain a direct relationship with her homeland. Absorbed by family duties Casanova has almost ceased to write; her only literary attempt of the time is a set of short stories based on her own experiences in what was still an exotic country to her, El doctor Wolski: páginas de Polonia y Rusia, published in Madrid in 1894. The volume was translated into Polish and went to print as Doktór Wolski: (Kartki z życia Polaków i Rosyan) in 1907.

In the early 20th century, the Lutosławski couple moved from Russia to Austro-Hungary and settled in Krakow, where Lutosławski was employed by the Yagiellonian University. Their house at Plac na Groblach became sort of a cultural and social hub; every Wednesday they staged literary sessions with eminent local writers taking part. It is there that Casanova came to know a number of Polish writers and politicians; the latter category included the nationalist leader Roman Dmowski. In 1908 the family returned to the Russian Empire and moved to Warsaw, though at that time the couple had already grown apart. Some biographers point to their not having had male children as an influence on the separation, as Wincenty began to have relationships with other women in search of an heir to his surname. Others emphasize the increasingly odd behaviour of Lutosławski, whose extravagant lifestyle and theories suggest mental instability. He developed an idea of spiritual purification of the Polish nation by means of moral sanity and abstinence. He followed it himself including somewhat eccentric means like physical exercises practiced naked; they stupefied Drozdowo peasants and Galician fishermen alike. When he unexpectedly sold their Warsaw house, in 1909, Casanova decided to return to Spain and take her youngest daughter with her; she settled in Madrid in the house of her brother Vicente. Lutosławski remarried, much to the indignation of his own family, who sided entirely with Casanova.

== Literary recognition ==
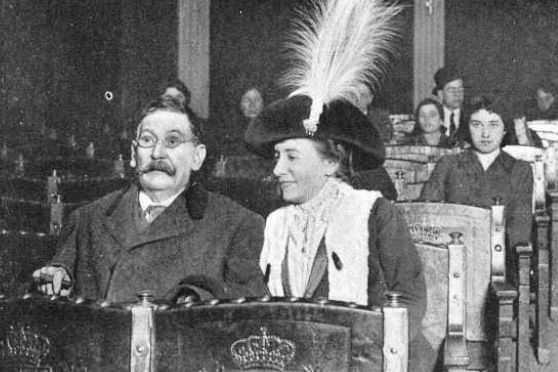
Casanova and Galdos at a scenic rehearsal of La Madeja in Madrid

Casanova's continuous moves combined with her literary experience and her study of language allowed her to master six other languages in addition to Spanish and Galician: French, English, Italian, Polish, Portuguese, and Russian. These became key knowledge for the translations that she would carry out in the future. Her trips also allowed her to meet personalities from the intellectual and political world such as Tolstoy, Marie Curie, and Morel-Fatio, whose opinions about the Spanish she collected in books and conferences. She made literary contributions to ABC, El Debate, Blanco y Negro, El Mundo, and Galicia, and her home in Madrid became a meeting place for Basilio Álvarez, Alfredo Vicenti, Ramón y Cajal, Alberto Insúa, Victoriano García Martí, and Castelao, who would illustrate her book Princesa del amor hermoso (1909). She maintained an intense social life, giving lectures and participating in so-called "social works". During the Krakow period she came to know and befriended a number of Polish writers, including Stanisław Wyspiański, Rydel, Kasprowicz and Władysław Reymont.

When back in Spain, Casanova resumed her literary works with renewed zeal. In 1909, she published Más que amor, a romance novel featuring a widowed Spanish woman living in Poland; the work contained barely veiled references to her own bitter experiences. Other novels falling into the similar genre were Princesa del amor hermoso (1909), El pecado (1911), Exóticas (1913), and El crimen de Beira-Mar (1914). La mujer española en el extranjero (1910) was a set of essays exploring cultural differences and again heavily based on her personal record. Her name started to feature regularly in literary sections of Spanish papers, herself counted among the mujeres ilustres ('distinguished women') of the literary world. Her photo was splashed on the front pages of illustrated periodicals. She tried also to go beyond the world of literature and pursued her interest in charity and education; she presided over the Madrid Comite Femenino de Higiene Popular.

Casanova is one of the few women whom Benito Pérez Galdós praised. After Gertrudis Gómez de Avellaneda, only Rosario de Acuña had managed to put on her dramas in the Teatro Español before Casanova. Pérez Galdos premiered Casanova's first dramatic piece, La madeja, on 12 March 1913. In the decision, the opinion of the lead actress, Matilde Moreno weighed heavily. The premise of the work responded to the idea that foreigners, with their eagerness for emancipation, wanted the destruction of the family. This was a reaction, according to the scholar María del Carmen Simón Palmer, of numerous writings of the late 19th and early 20th century against feminist currents from the United States. Although critics praised the content of the work, a misinterpretation on the night of the premiere – the chronicle tells – prevented its comedy from being represented on successive days. Casanova's rise to acknowledged literary status was sort of officially confirmed when in 1906 she was elected a member of the Royal Galician Academy and in 1911 she joined the Academy of Spanish Poetry.

== War correspondent ==
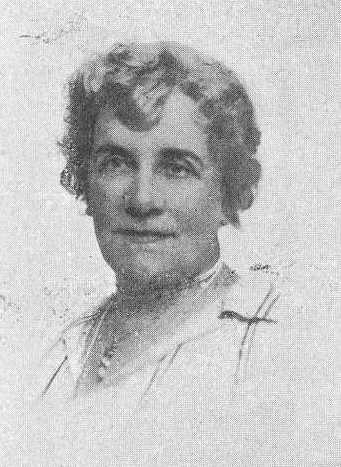
Casanova, interwar period

Casanova traveled frequently to Poland, where some of her daughters lived; the oldest, Maria (Manita), got married in 1910. At that time, Casanova spoke Polish very well, though with a Spanish accent which most of her relatives and friends found charming and amusing. During one of these trips, in July 1914, World War I broke out. After a month of resistance, she left Drozdowo in the direction of Warsaw, where she became a battalion nurse for the dying. This horrific trip, her biographers recount, hurt her deeply and would change her life. She reported on it in a letter to ABC, trying to convince her compatriots that their growing admiration for the Germans was not justified; however, in general she tried to stick to the officially adopted neutral standpoint.

In the late summer of 1914, Luis Morote, a Russian correspondent for Heraldo de Madrid, happened to be in Warsaw seeking news on the war developments. It is there he met Casanova, who provided him with some local information. Encouraged, she started to provide her own correspondence to El Liberal; Casanova's first contributions appeared in October 1914. Torcuato Luca de Tena, owner and director of ABC, wrote a letter with the proposal that she become its correspondent in Eastern Europe, which she accepted; a biographer believes she was formally contracted by ABC in December 1914.

In 1915, the German advance forced the evacuation of Warsaw. She continued working in the hospital and shortly before the German takeover of Warsaw she fled with her daughters on the last train to Minsk and Moscow, where she remained with the family of her brother-in-law until October 1916. She continued to send war correspondence, but she acted also as delegate of the Warsaw Civic Committee, visiting troops on the frontlines and distributing food and medicine. Given increasing shortages of commodities, Casanova and the Lutosławski family transferred to St. Petersburg in late 1916. The Romanov dynasty was about to fall and the writer and journalist witnessed the moment and reported on it – not without difficulties, since she was persecuted and censored for her stories from St. Petersburg, where she reported on the death of Rasputin. After these reports, the Russian censors forbade her to communicate with Spain, and her silence even caused some to consider her dead.

In 1917, she witnessed the February Revolution, which she again shared in her writings. Initially she tended to demonstrate some sympathy for radicalised soldiers and workers, underlying what she viewed as their sufferings and peaceful spirit. During the popular uprising of 3 July, harshly suppressed by government troops, Casanova received an accidental blow in the eyes from one of those fleeing the street shooting. The consequences of this accident were disastrous for the writer, because in spite of the care she received she would never again be able to see well. In spite of everything, she did not stop writing. She was eyewitness to the Bolshevik coup of October 1917, which she reported in detail. Shortly afterwards she visited impromptu the Smolny Palace and managed to interview Trotsky. Casanova still nurtured some illusions about the Russian revolution, yet the tone of her correspondence started to change, especially after two half-brothers of her husband had been executed by the Bolsheviks. In September 1918 Casanova and the Lutosławski family managed to leave St. Petersburg, crossed the Soviet-German demarcation line and returned to Warsaw. Later, she would describe the Bolshevik revolution as triumph of barbaric hordes, heavily aided by Jewish conspiracy.

== Happy years ==
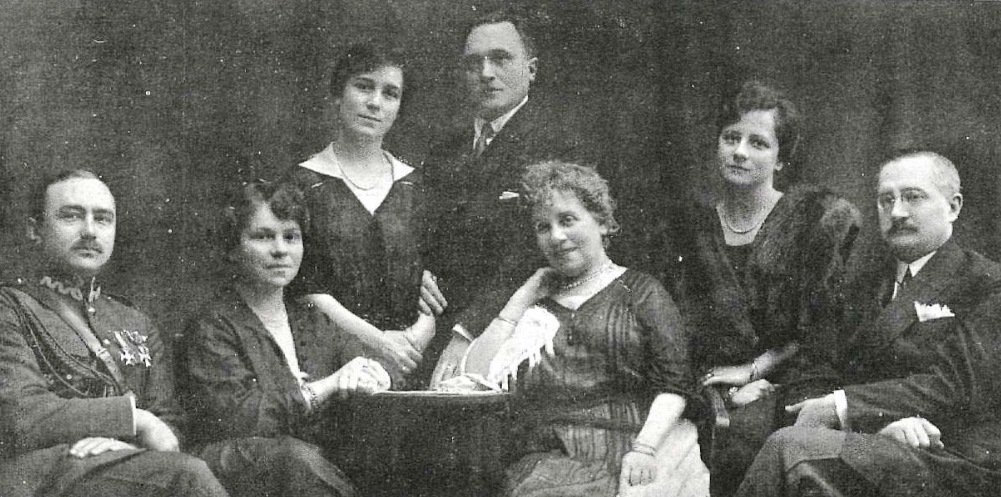
Casanova, her daughters and their husbands, 1920s

In 1918, Casanova returned from Russia to Warsaw, already capital of the independent Poland. She settled with the family of her oldest daughter and commenced perhaps the happiest period of her life; she was growing old surrounded by loving, well-to-do family and numerous grandchildren, publishing many books, basking in prestige in both Spain and Poland and mixing with some of the best-known Polish politicians. She admitted to have been entirely "polaquizada".

By the early 1920s, her three daughters were already married; unlike the marriage of her parents and this of her own, marriages of Casanova's daughters were very successful. Maria (1888–1979) wed Mieczysław Niklewicz, a journalist, publisher and prestigious figure in the Polish nationalist party; she became an eminent figure in the party herself. They lived in Warsaw but later inherited the Drozdowo estate. Izabela (1889–1972) married Romuald Wolikowski, junior officer in the Russian army who later grew to Polish general. The couple lived in various Polish cities following Wolikowski's service assignments. Izabela was the best-known of all three sisters; she became a writer and her novels, fairly popular in the 1930s, were an attempt to combine Catholic morality drama and popular novel. Halina (1897–1989) married physician Czesław Meissner, who as a nationalist deputy served in the Polish interwar parliament three times; the couple lived in Poznań. A close family friend was the Polish nationalist leader Roman Dmowski, whom Casanova befriended in the 1900s; some scholars claim that she wielded "enormous informal influence in Polish Catholic and nationalist circles", and that her three daughters became Dmowski's "surrogate family". Though politically she admitted having been a supporter of Endecja, she reserved respectful words for its key political foe, Piłsudski; she declared that democracy was not an operational concept and that dictatorship, be it this of Piłsudski in Poland or Primo de Rivera in Spain, was a much better solution.

Casanova used to visit Spain fairly often, at least six times between 1920 and 1930; during one of the visits in 1919, she was received as a heroine and greeted with many tributes. During the 1925 visit she received from Alfonso XIII the Grand Cross of the Civil Order of Beneficence, awarded in recognition of her collaboration with the Red Cross during World War I. In 1926, Casanova was nominated to the Nobel Prize in Literature; the award eventually went to George B. Shaw. She kept writing, busy mostly with providing correspondence from Warsaw to various Spanish periodicals, chiefly ABC, where she published under the heading Desde Polonia; in the 1920s her contributions alone amounted to some 400. Until the early 1930s, she published 17 books in Spain, mostly short novels though also works styled as documentary accounts from the turmoil in Russia in 1917–1918. In both Spain and Poland she was recognized as an eminent literary figure, though very few of her works have been translated and published in Polish. In the Spanish papers she was noted usually either in the societé columns or in relation to her subsequent books; in the early 1930s left-wing press started to mock her accounts of revolutionary horrors she had witnessed.

== Casanova towards the Republic and the Civil War ==
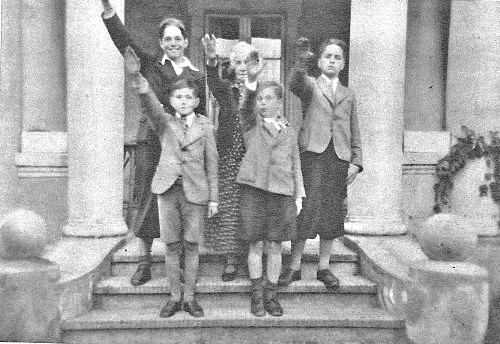
Sofía Casanova gives the Francoist salute surrounded by her grandchildren, Poland 1938

In 1931, she witnessed the proclamation of the Second Spanish Republic, with the conviction that what happened to her while living in Russia in 1917 was going to happen in her own country. With the closure of the newspaper ABC, she lost her job for a few months. This fact made her hate the Republicans, a feeling that increased until in 1936 she wrote one of the last articles of her collaboration with the newspaper Mirando a Rusia (Looking to Russia).

At the outbreak of the Spanish Civil War, Casanova lived in Warsaw; she almost immediately declared herself in favor of the Nationalists and together with her daughters and grandchildren participated in a number of events supposed to support the cause among the Poles. With the Madrid headquarters of ABC seized by the Republicans, she kept sending correspondence from Poland to the competitive, Nationalist-held Sevilla headquarters of the daily. In her contributions she clearly sided with the Nationalist faction and hailed the Crusade, lambasting the Republicans as "hordes which lost the right to call themselves humans and which should rather be dealt with by zoology". In return, the Republican press mocked her as sort of a plague which descended upon Poland.

Casanova visited Spain between October and December 1938. She twice met Francisco Franco, first in Burgos and then in La Coruña. Caudillo gave her his family photograph with personal dedication. She has also signed a homage address of "Galician women" to the generalissimo. In December of that year, she declared to La Voz de Galicia on the occasion of her departure to Warsaw that she was convinced that the coup d'état provoked by an army sector would bring moments of development and splendor to Spain. It is also the year in which she visited La Coruña and her village for the last time.

According to some scholars, the position enjoyed by Casanova in the world of literature was used by Francoist Spain. One author plays down her support for the Nationalists by claiming that she "let herself be carried away, perhaps with good will, by the advice of some friends", all resulting from her experiences during the past, including these related to the Bolshevik Revolution. Another one of Casanova's biographers underlines the weight of her experiences of 1917–1920 and suggests that they prevented the old woman from noticing the genuine nature of "the army, which cracked down on just claims of own people and left them in the pool of blood". One more scholar claims that her support for Franco is "difficult to comprehend"; he eventually notes that the key to understanding Casanova's position is noting her concept of peace, reportedly rooted in classical anthropology. However, because of her stand during the Civil War, a historian of literature with no reservations counts Casanova – dubbed also an anti-semite – among the Spanish representatives of "literatura fascista".

== World War II and afterwards ==
At the outbreak of World War II, Casanova lived in Warsaw with her oldest daughter. Following the German takeover of the city and to spare her hardships of daily life, the Spanish ambassador to Berlin issued her a Spanish passport, which allowed her to live with some security while contemplating the National Socialist barbarism. Thanks to the assistance of Casimiro Florencio Granzow de la Cerda, former member of the Spanish diplomatic staff to Warsaw and unofficial representative of Spanish business after 1939, Casanova was able to resume her war correspondence to ABC. In her writings, she extensively dwelled upon German policy in the occupied Poland and assumed a vehemently anti-National Socialist stand. At one point it was rejected by Torcuato Luca de la Tena; he advised Casanova not to touch upon the subject anymore. She was profoundly upset by the position taken by ABC and its director; she became "radically disillusioned" with the newspaper that used to matter greatly to her. According to her grandson, it was the turning point of Casanova's life and the first of her "three deaths".

According to some sources, Franco was personally interested in Casanova's fate and suggested assistance when arranging a would-be transfer back to Spain. Others claim that she had an opportunity to return to Spain with the Blue Division when the unit was being withdrawn from the Eastern Front. One way or another, she declined the offer and decided to stay with her loved ones in Poland. She remained in fairly good shape and every morning frequented the nearby St. Alexander church to attend the mass. A staunch Catholic, she had a moral problem related to her self-admitted hatred towards the enemies of Poland; she used to confess it as a sin, but she could have not stopped hating.

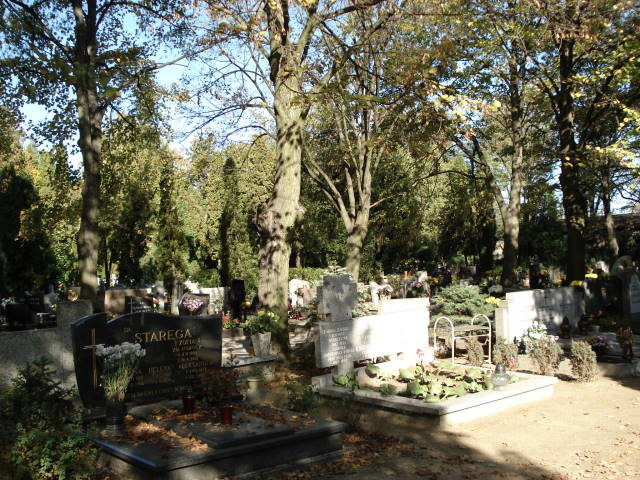
Jan Vianney cemetery, Poznań

With her Warsaw house reduced to rubble during the Warsaw Uprising she moved to Poznań to live with her daughter Halina's family. Most of her manuscripts were burnt or otherwise lost in course of the fighting in 1944–1945. Although she was almost blind, she continued to write, aided by her grandchildren, to whom she dictated her last experiences. According to some sources, she wanted to end her days in Spain; other sources suggest that she chose to stay with her family in the Communist-held Poland, even at the cost of renouncing her Spanish citizenship, which reportedly was in a way her "second death". In 1950 Josefa López Calvo died; she was known as Pepa, a female Galician servant who accompanied Casanova since her Russian days. In 1952 the Royal Galician Academy named Casanova an academic of honor. She died in Poznań on 16 January 1958; her death was acknowledged by some Spanish press titles, and a few published related homage articles. At the moment of death she had at least ten living grandchildren; it is not clear whether and how many great-grandchildren she had. She is buried in the Poznań Jan Vianney cemetery.

== Journalistic and literary career ==
At the time of the founding of the Royal Galician Academy, in 1906, Casanova already had work and recognition worldwide, which led to her being named a member of this organization, and in 1952 she was unanimously granted the title of academic of honor.

She published novels, short stories, a comedy, and more than 1,200 articles in newspapers and magazines in Galicia and Poland. Her literary, narrative, poetry, and theater output was very prolific. It includes four collections of poetry, five novels, eight short novels, short stories, a play that Benito Pérez Galdós premiered at the Teatro Español, a children's book, and eight volumes of social, cultural, and political commentaries. She gave numerous lectures on the situation of women and international relations, both in Spain and in Poland, and translated classical works from Polish and Russian into Spanish.

As a journalist she wrote almost 1,000 stories, of which the articles published in ABC between 1915 and 1936 stand out, as do the titles La mujer española en el extranjero (Madrid, 1910), De la Revolución rusa (Madrid, 1918), Impresiones de una mujer en el frente oriental de la guerra europea (Madrid, 1919), La revolución bolchevista, Diario de un testigo (Madrid, 1920), and El martirio de Polonia.

She took a pacifist and anti-war stance, and said so in her contributions to the press during the Rif War in Morocco and the Tragic Week of Barcelona. But the work where this position is most forcefully demonstrated is in the chronicles of Poland and Russia that she wrote for the press and which were collected in the book De la guerra in 1916.

Her penchant for studying led her to learn six languages and translate the most famous Polish writers such as Sienkiewicz into Spanish. Her work was also translated into French, Polish, Swedish, and Dutch.

== Legacy ==
Though very popular and acclaimed in the interwar period, today Casanova is no longer counted among great names of literature in Castellano. She is usually absent not only in very basic and mid-size synthetic works on Spanish literature but also in multi-volume in-depth accounts. Even specialized studies dedicated to specific genres, e.g. to novels or poetry, tend to ignore her. If appearing in encyclopedias or dictionaries, only a few lines are dedicated to her; she is described briefly as "poetisa y narradora". She is treated somewhat more extensively only in synthetic works on Spanish feminist literature; the opinion which hails her as "the most significant poet of this [19th century] period, and one of Spain's most remarkable women" is rather exceptional.

Except a minor 1964 booklet almost entirely forgotten after her death, Casanova has enjoyed some revival of interest since the 1990s. She earned at least three PhD dissertations, some of them released commercially; other books were also published, be it in the United States, Spain or Poland. A spate of minor works followed, printed either in specialized literary periodicals or in other volumes; more than 50 scientific articles on Casanova's life and works appeared during the last 20 years. A number of journalistic pieces were published in popular periodicals, especially in Galicia but also in the nationwide Spanish press and a few in Poland. Most of the authors no longer present Casanova as an extraordinary writer, and if focusing on her writings, they tend rather to emphasize her work as a correspondent and journalist. Instead of a great woman of literature, she is presented rather as an extraordinary person who lived a fascinating life, crossed cultural frontiers and was witness to many dramatic developments of her era. She is discussed against the background of the feminine movement, gender issues, social change, the Russian Revolution, nationalism, both world wars, the history of journalism, cross-cultural challenges, cultural conflict in Spain, and Spanish-Polish or Spanish-Russian relations. In 2011 a full-length documentary movie was dedicated to Casanova, co-financed by the Galician self-government. In 2016, Inés Martín Rodrigo published a biographical novel about Casanova called Azules son las horas. At least two schools in Galicia bear the name of Sofía Casanova: one in Ferrol and one in Culleredo. In a few cities there are streets dedicated to Casanova, e.g. in Madrid and La Coruña.

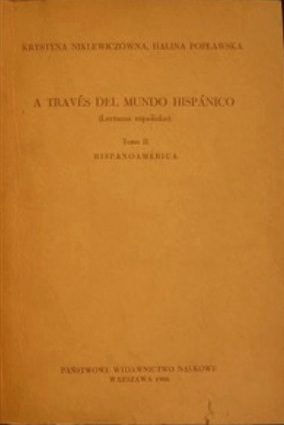
Textbook by Casanova's granddaughter

Among Casanova's grandchildren the best known was Karol Meissner, a Benedictine presbyter, academic, translator and great personality among the Polish conventual clergy; Maria Niklewicz became a nun and longtime abbess of the Visitandine convent in Warsaw. Krystyna Niklewicz was a hispanist, academic and translator, while Ryszard Niklewicz served as a well-known physician. Czesław Meissner was a moderately successful theatrical actor. Andrzej Meissner fought in the Warsaw Uprising, survived and later served as engineer; Andrzej Wolikowski fought in the RAF during the Battle of Britain and did not return to Poland; his brother Grzegorz Wolikowski perished at 17 years of age due to wounds suffered in combat during the Warsaw Uprising. The most eminent of Casanova's great-grandchildren is Krzysztof Meissner, a theoretical physicist known for his Catholic zeal.

== Works ==
- El doctor Wolski: páginas de Polonia y Rusia, Madrid, Imp. del Suc. de J. Cruzado a cargo de Felipe Marqués, 1894
- Princesa del amor hermoso, Madrid, Impr. Artística Española, 1909 (serial story, vol. 3, no. 156)
- La mujer española en el extranjero, Madrid, 1910
- El pecado, Madrid, Imp. de Alrededor del Mundo / Libr. de los Suc. de Hernando, 1911 (Biblioteca de escritores gallegos, 10)
- Exóticas, Madrid, Suc. de Hernando, 1913
- La madeja, Madrid, Imp. de "Alrededor del mundo", 1913 (Los contemporáneos y los maestros, 241), theater
- El crimen de Beira-Mar, Madrid, Talleres de Ediciones Españolas, 1914 (El Libro Popular, vol. 3, no. 8)
- De la guerra: crónicas de Polonia y Rusia. Primera serie, Madrid, Renacimiento, 1916
- De la Revolución rusa en 1917, Madrid, Renacimiento, 1917
- Sobre el Volga helado, Madrid, Prensa Popular, 1919 (short novel, vol. 4, no. 196)
- Triunfo de amor, Madrid, Prensa Popular, 1919 (short novel, vol. 4, no. 186)
- El doctor Wolski, Madrid, Prensa Popular, 1920 (short novel, vol. 5, no. 255)
- Lo eterno, Madrid, Prensa Popular, 1920 (short novel, vol. 5, no. 218)
- La revolución bolchevista: (diario de un testigo), Madrid, Biblioteca Nueva, 1920
- Viajes y aventuras de una muñeca española en Rusia, Burgos, Hijos de Santiago Rodríguez, 1920
- Episodio de guerra, Madrid, Prensa Popular, 1921 (short novel, vol. 6, no. 299)
- Princesa rusa, Madrid, Publicaciones Prensa Gráfica, 1922 (serial novel, vol. 2, no. 55)
- Valor y miedo, Madrid, Prensa Popular, 1922 (short novel, vol. 7, no. 348)
- Kola el bandido, Madrid, Publicaciones Prensa Gráfica, 1923 (serial novel, vol. 3, no. 101)
- En la corte de los zares, Madrid, Libr. y Edit. Madrid, 1924 (1 complete work)
- El doctor Wolski, Madrid, Libr. y Edit. Madrid, 1925 (2 complete works)
- El dolor de reinar, Madrid, Publicaciones Prensa Gráfica, 1925 (serial novel, vol. 5, no. 213)
- El pecado, Madrid, Libr. y Edit. Madrid, 1926 (3 complete works)
- Amores y confidencias: de Rusia, Madrid, Libr. y Edit. Madrid, 1927 (4 complete works)
- En la corte de los zares (del principio y del fin del imperio), Madrid, Biblioteca Rubén Darío, 1929 (1 complete work)
- El pecado, Madrid, Dédalo, c. 1930 (novels and short stories)
- Como en la vida, Madrid, Aguilar, 1931
- Idilio epistolar, Madrid, Aguilar, 1931
- Las catacumbas de Rusia roja, Madrid, Espasa Calpe, 1933
- El martirio de Polonia, 2nd ed. Madrid, Atlas, 1945 (with Miguel Branicki)
- Como en la vida, Madrid, 1947 (novels and short stories, vol. 19, no. 951)
- Princesa del amor hermoso, in: Novelas breves de escritoras españolas, 1900-1936, Edición de Ángeles Ena Bordonada, Madrid, Castalia / Instituto de la Mujer, 1990 (Biblioteca de escritoras, 10)
- La revolución bolchevista: (diario de un testigo), Edición de M. Victoria López Cordón. Madrid, Castalia / Instituto de la Mujer, 1990 (Biblioteca de escritoras, 11)
- Galicia la inefable, Edición de Mª Rosario Martínez Martínez, Santiago de Compostela, Xunta de Galicia, 1996
