= List of awards and honours received by Józef Piłsudski =

Józef Piłsudski has been awarded numerous honours, domestic and foreign.

== Polish National honours ==
=== National honours ===
- Order of the White Eagle (1921)
- Order of Virtuti Militari
  - Knight's Cross
  - Commander's Cross
  - Grand Cross
- Cross of Independence with Swords (6 November 1930)
- Order of Polonia Restituta
  - Commander's Cross with Star
  - Grand Cordon

=== Military honours ===
- Cross of Valour (four times)
- Gold Cross of Merit (four times, including in 1931)
- Cross of Merit of the Central Lithuania Army
- Cross of Silesian Merit and Valor
- Officers' Badge "Parasol" (1912)
- Officers' Badge "For Faithful Service" (1916)
- Cross Kaniowski (1929)

=== Other honours ===
- Scouting Cross (1920)
- "Gold trade union" Chief Fire Brigades Union [78]
- Badge "Józef Piłsudski Polish Legion Commander" (1916) [80]
- Commemorative Badge of former prisoners from the years 1914–1921 Ideological (1928) [81]

== Foreign honours ==
- Austria-Hungary:
  - Order of the Iron Crown Class III (Austria-Hungary)
- Belgium
  - Grand Cross of the Order of Leopold
- Bulgaria
  - Order of Saint Alexander with Swords
- Brazil
  - Grand Collar of the Order of the Southern Cross Class
- Czechoslovakia
  - Czechoslovak War Cross 1918
- Estonia
  - Order of the Cross of the Eagle, Class I (Estonia, 1930)
  - Cross of Liberty
    - Grade I
    - Grade III
- Finland
  - Grand Cross of the White Rose of Finland with Collar
- France
  - Grand Cross of the Legion of Honour, No. 25864 (continuous numbering)
  - Médaille militaire
- Spain
  - Grand Cross – Yellow Decoration of the Order of Military Merit
- Japan
  - Grand Cordon of the Order of the Rising Sun
- Kingdom of Yugoslavia
  - Order of the Karađorđe's Star
- Latvia
  - Order of Lāčplēsis, Class I
- SMOM
  - Bailiff Knight Grand Cross of Honour and Devotion Sovereign Military Order of St. John of Jerusalem, Class IV
- Portugal
  - Grand Cross of the Order of the Tower and Sword
- Kingdom of Romania
  - Collar of the Order of Carol I
  - Order of Michael the Brave, Classes I, II and III (Romania)
- Hungary
  - Grand Cross of Merit
- Kingdom of Italy
  - Knight Grand Cross of the Order of Saints Maurice and Lazarus
  - Knight Grand Cross of the Military Order of Savoy

== Honorary doctorates ==
- Jagiellonian University (28 April 1920) [102]
- Adam Mickiewicz University (11 November 1933)
- University of Warsaw (2 May 1921) [103]
- Stefan Batory University in Vilnius (September 1921)
