= Monument to Fidel Castro (Moscow) =

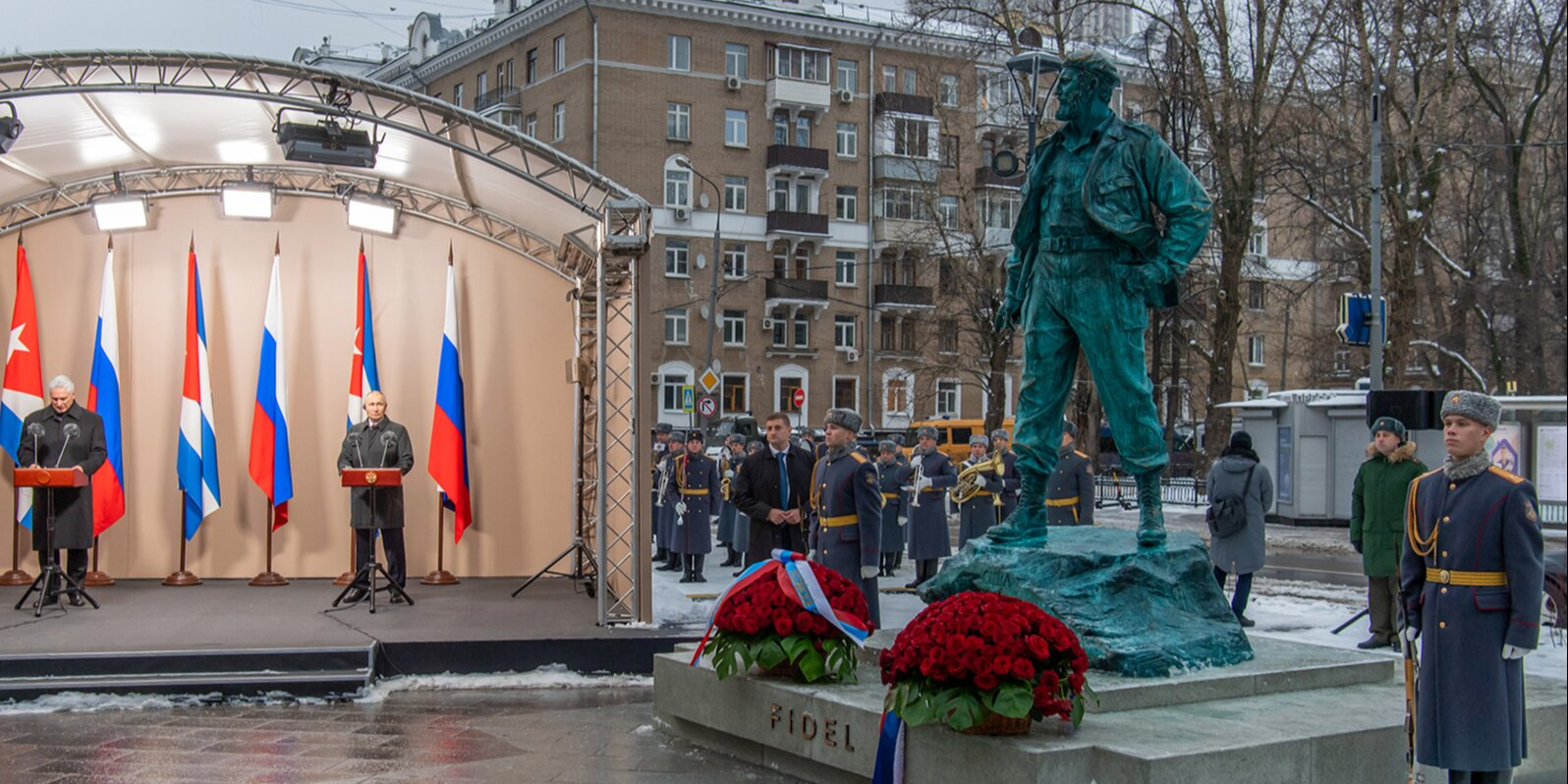
- Miguel Díaz-Canel and Vladimir Putin at the unveiling of the monument
- Interactive map of Monument to Fidel Castro
- Location: Moscow, Russia
- Type: Monument
- Material: Bronze, granite
- Opening date: 22 November 2022
- Dedicated to: Fidel Castro

Monument to Fidel Castro was erected in 2022 in Moscow in Sokol district, at the Fidel Castro square. It was sculpted by Alexey Chebanenko and Andrey Bely.

== History ==
On February 15, 2017, by decree of the Moscow Government, an unnamed square in the Sokol district of Moscow was named after Fidel Castro. On February 11, 2022, the Moscow City Duma decided to erect a monument to Fidel Castro on the square. Some residents of the Sokol district did not approve of this initiative.

Following a closed competition, the work of sculptor Alexey Chebanenko and architect Andrey Bely was selected from 11 projects. The Russian Military Historical Society allocated 20 million rubles for the implementation of the project. 1.5 tons of Pulkovo clay were used in the process of making the monument, which was then cast in bronze. The authors planned to install the monument strictly in the center of the square, but due to underground communications it had to be moved closer to one side of the road.

The opening was originally planned for Castro's birthday (August 13), but was then postponed. On November 19, the monument was placed on its pedestal. The grand opening of the monument took place on November 22, 2022. The ceremony was attended by Cuban President Miguel Díaz-Canel and Russian President Vladimir Putin.

== Description ==
The bronze monument stands 3 meters tall and is covered with an artificial patina. The sculpture is mounted on a granite pedestal with its back to the fountain in the Moscow People's Militia Divisions Square. Castro's figure, wearing a military uniform and beret, stands on a rock bearing the outline of Cuba and the inscription "CUBA".

Sculptor Alexey Chebanenko described his work this way:

This is a massive human figure standing on a cube. Not on an island, but rather the shape of the pedestal. I placed him not in a precarious position, but firmly, with his legs spread wide apart, as if feeling the gusts of change, all the hardships and difficulties passing through him.

— Alexey Chebanenko
