= Vsekhsvyatskoye =

Vsekhsvyatskoye Всехсвятское
- Former village
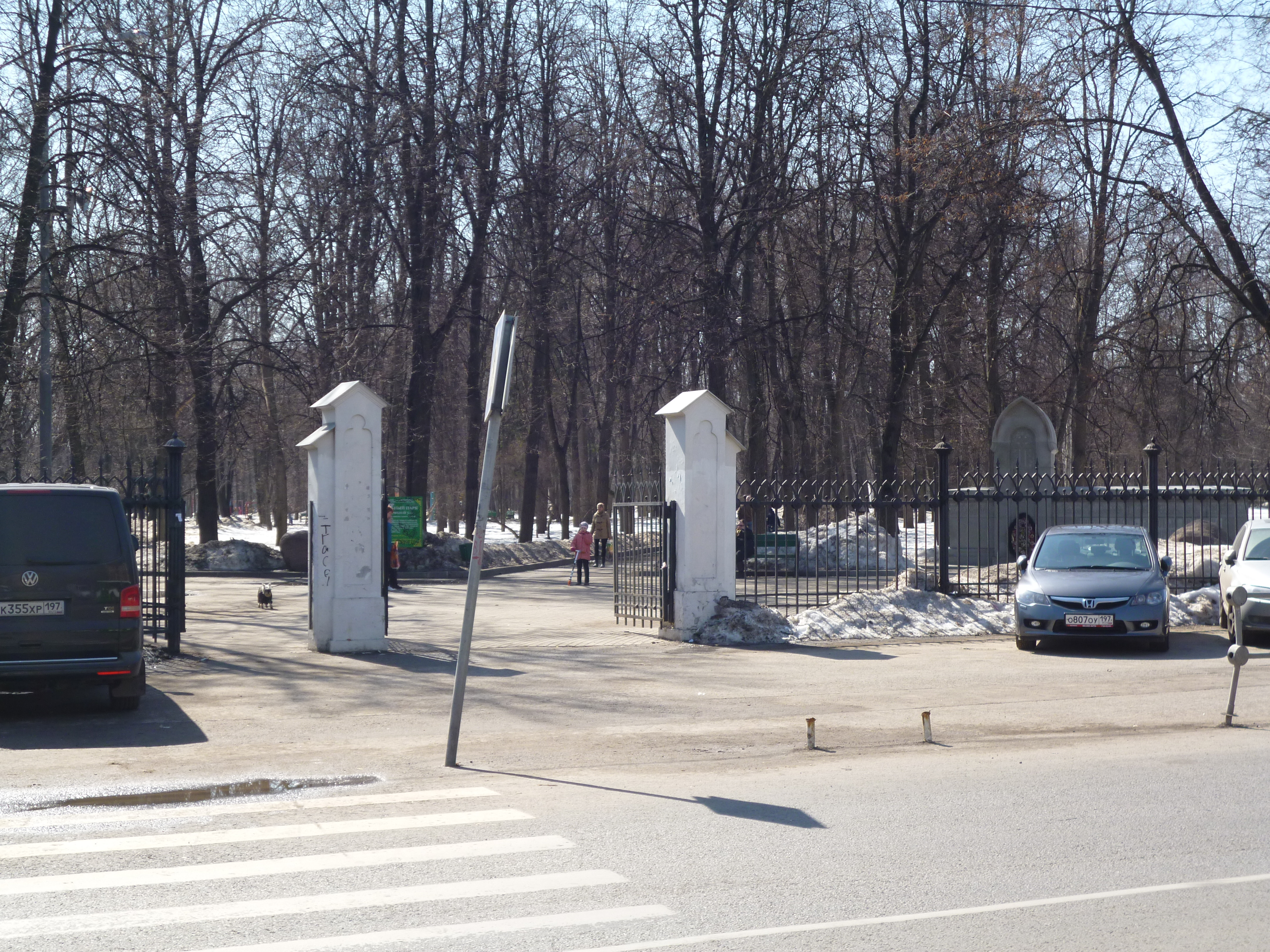
- Main entrance

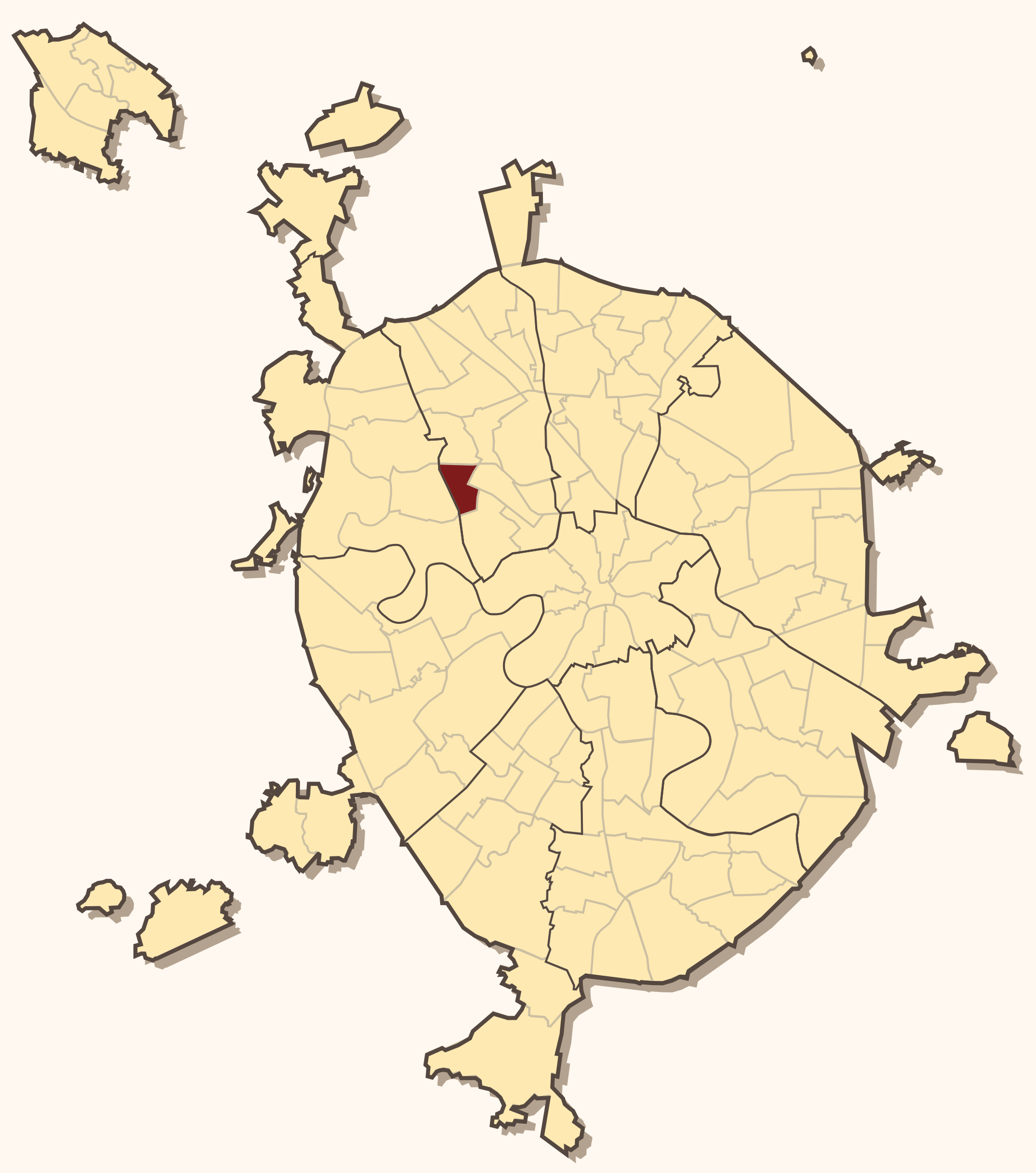
- Location of Vsekhsvyatskoye, the Sokol District of Moscow

Vsekhsvyatskoye (Russian: Всехсвятское), formerly a village outside Moscow, Russia; now a city neighbourhood in Sokol District, is known for its historic Brotherly Cemetery of Russian soldiers who died in World War One.

The cemetery is also known for its mass graves of the October Revolution, which remained unmarked for the entire Soviet period.

== Red Terror ==
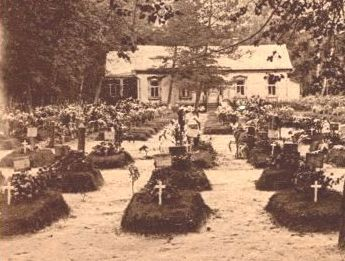
Chapel, 1915

During the Red Terror, scores of suspected counterrevolutionaries and various political opponents were murdered at Vsekhsvyatskoye without trial in secret executions. The victims included foreign nationals captured by the Bolsheviks and transported in large groups from the Butyrsky prison, such as the famous Polish inventor Marian Lutosławski and his brother Józef, father of the composer Witold Lutosławski.
