= Kazimierz Lutosławski =

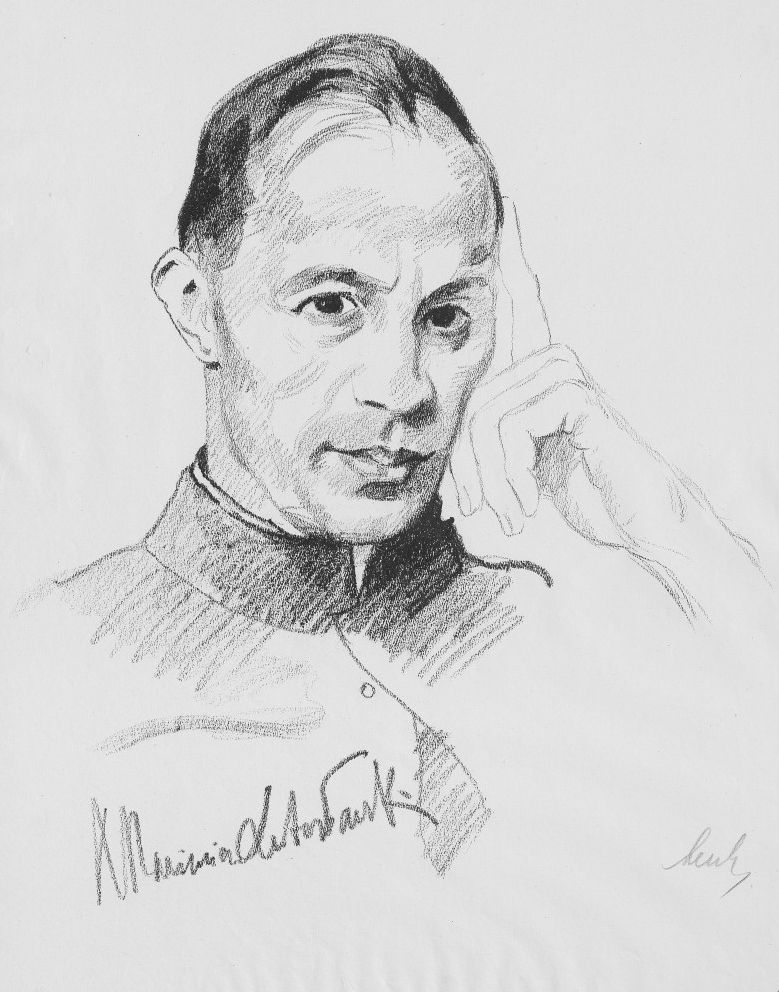
Kazimierz Lutosławski

Kazimierz Lutosławski (Polish pronunciation: [kaˈʑi.mjɛʂ lutɔsˈwafski]; 4 March 1880, Drozdowo, Podlaskie Voivodeship - 5 January 1924, Drozdowo, Poland) was a Polish physician, priest and Polish Scouting founder and activist. He designed the Krzyż Harcerski (Polish Scouting Cross).

Kazimierz was born in 1880 at an estate in Drozdowo northeast of Warsaw to a Polish family of agronomist Franciszek Dionizy Lutosławski and his second wife Paulina née Szczygielska, highly educated members of the landed gentry. Kazimierz became one of Franciszek's six notable sons. He received doctorate in medicine in Zürich, Switzerland. Kazimierz was the fifth son of Franciszek. His older brother Marian Lutosławski, famous inventor and humanitarian, was murdered by the Bolsheviks near Moscow together with his other brother Józef Lutosławski, the father of composer Witold Lutosławski. Witold was Kazimierz Lutosławski's nephew.

Historian Paul Brykczynsk described Lutosławski as a sophisticated parliamentary, prolific writer, spirited street orator and rabid antisemite who advocated in his writings and speeches for a "Polish majority" in Poland.
