= Inés Martín Rodrigo =

Spanish writer and cultural journalist (born 1983)

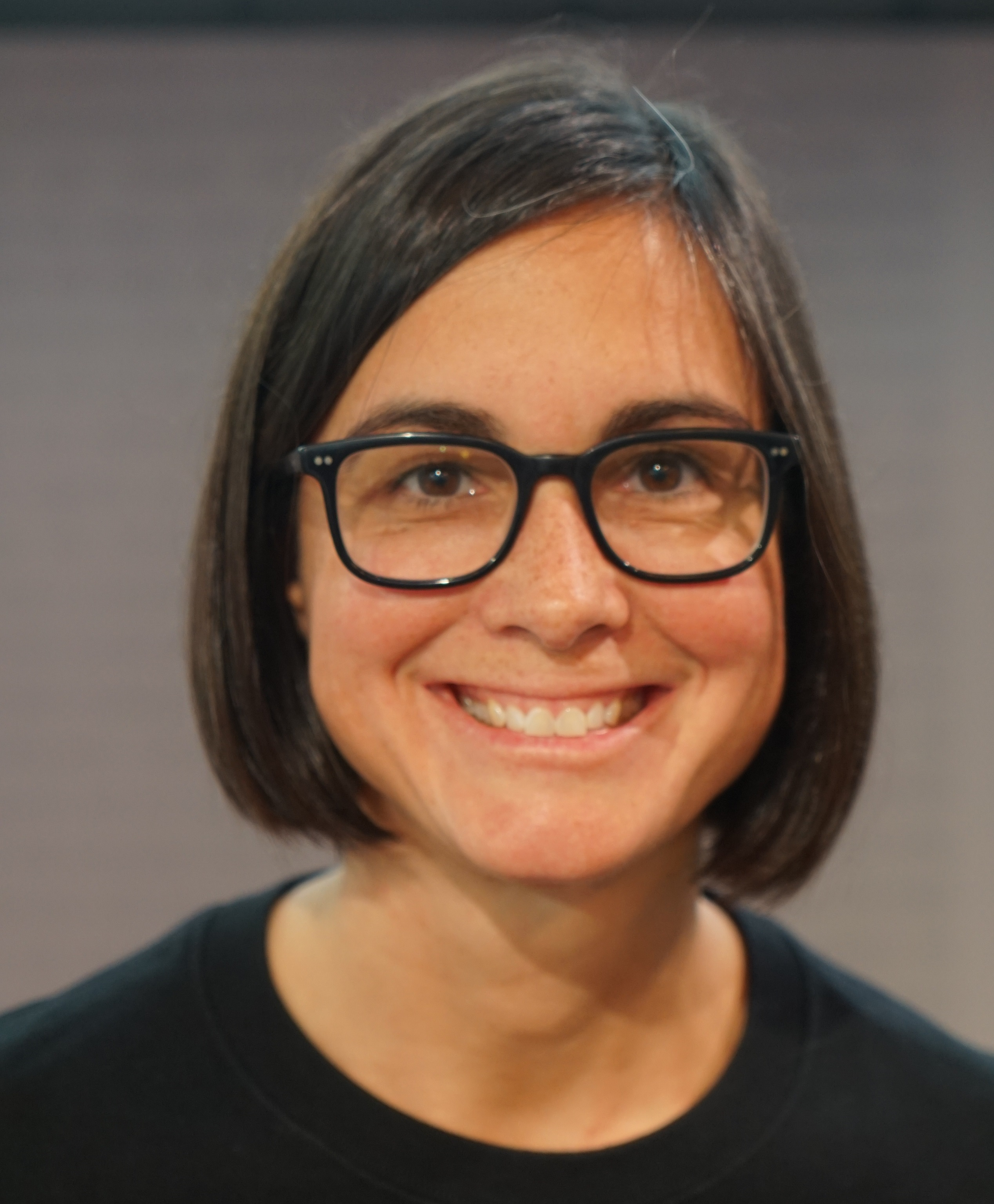
- Born: 1983 (age 42–43); Madrid, Spain
- Writing career
- Notable work: Las formas del querer

Inés Martín Rodrigo (born 1983) is a Spanish writer and cultural journalist. Her novel Las formas del querer is the winner of the Premio Nadal 2022.

== Early life and education ==
Inés Martín Rodrigo was born in 1983, in Madrid, and grew up in a village in Extremadura. She completed a journalism degree at the Complutense University of Madrid.

== Career ==
Martín Rodrigo works as a journalist and since 2008 has been writing for the culture section of ABC, where she coordinates the coverage of literature.

In 2016, Martín Rodrigo published her first work of fiction Azules son las horas, a biographical work which focused on the life of Sofía Casanova. Her second novel Las formas del querer, which was published six years later, won the Premio Nadal. Martín Rodrigo's body of work also includes short stories, an anthology of interviews with women writers Una habitación compartida, as well as prologues to works by such authors as David Foster Wallace, Virginia Woolf or Carmen Laforet.

In 2019, Martín Rodrigo was chosen by the Spanish Agency for International Development Cooperation to be one of the Spanish authors promoted abroad as part of their newly launched 10 de 30 program. She served as a judge for various Spanish literary awards, including Critical Eye Awards and collaborated with Hay Festival in Segovia.

== Works ==
- Azules son las horas, 2016
- Una habitación compartida: conversaciones con grandes escritoras, 2020
- Giselle, 2020 (a children's book with illustrations by Raquel Aparicio)
- Las formas del querer, 2022
- Una homosexualidad propia, 2023
- Otra versión de ti, 2025
