= Wincenty Lutosławski =

Polish philosopher (1863–1954)

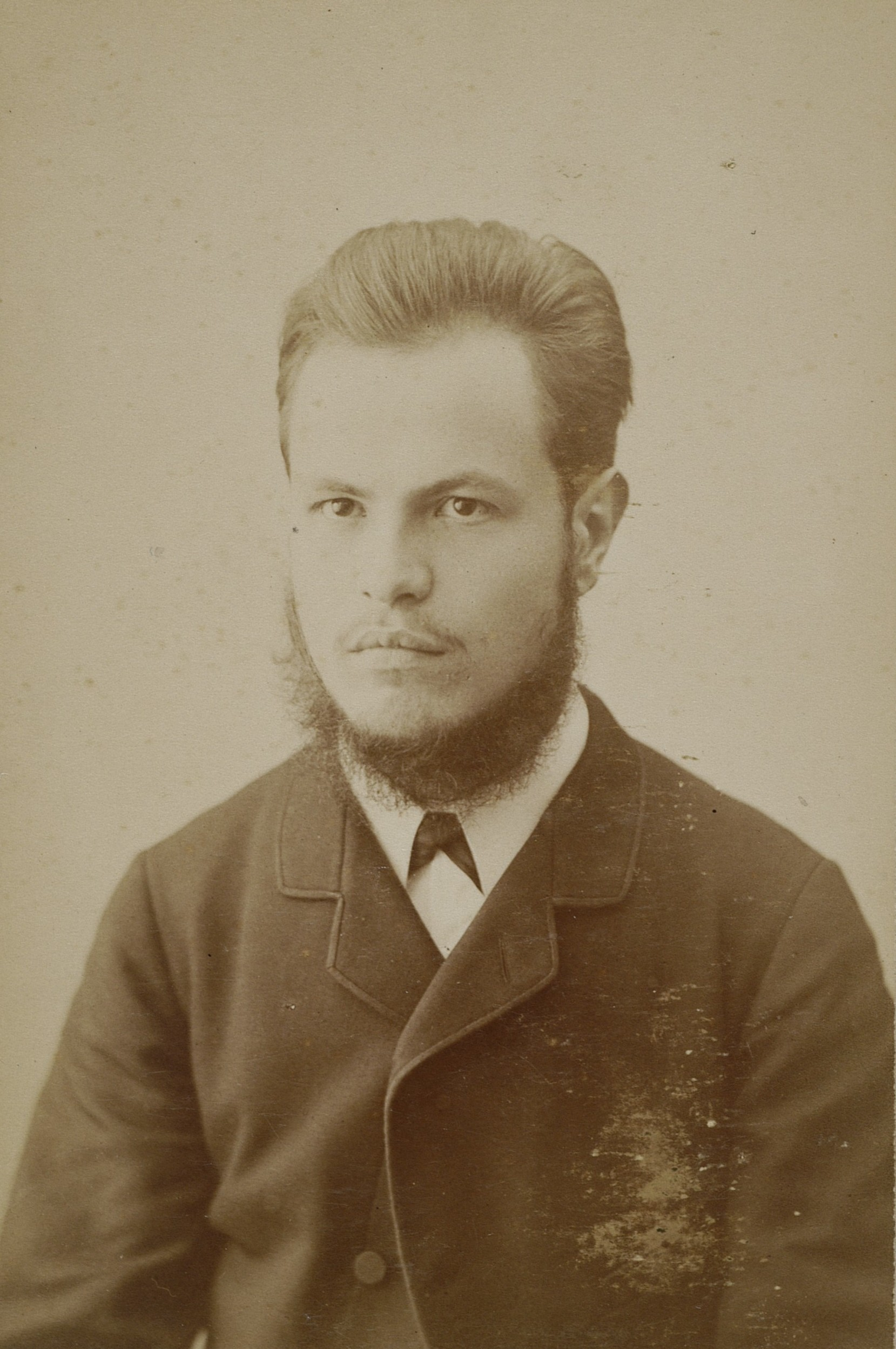
- Wincenty Lutosławski, 1885
- Born: 6 June 1863; Warsaw, Congress Poland
- Died: 28 December 1954 (age 91); Kraków, Poland
- Spouse: Sofía Casanova
- Relatives: Marian (brother); Kazimierz (brother); Witold (nephew)

Education
- Education: Imperial University of Dorpat; University of Helsinki

Philosophical work
- Era: Modern philosophy: 19th-century philosophy; 20th-century philosophy
- Region: Western philosophy: Polish philosophy
- School: Platonism; Polish nationalism
- Institutions: National League; Eleusis
- Main interests: Classics; Politics; Religion
- Notable ideas: Stylometry; Chronology of Plato's dialogues

Wincenty Lutosławski (6 June 1863 – 28 December 1954) was a Polish philosopher, author, and member of the Polish National League.

He advocated a metaphysical system influenced by Leibniz and Plato and authored the first Polish yoga reference book.

== Life and career ==
=== Early life ===
Wincenty was the eldest son of Franciszek Dionizy Lutosławski, a landowner from Drozdowo and Maria Lutosławska, née Szczygielska. He was half-brother to Józef Lutosławski, who was the father of composer Witold Lutosławski. In his youth he was home schooled. In 1880, after suffering a breakdown, he became an atheist and materialist. A year later he graduated from secondary school in Mitawa and commenced his studies at the Riga Polytechnic, where he lasted only for three semesters. He was unable to complete his studies due to poor health as well as the internal conflict within Arkonia fraternity. In 1884 he enrolled at the Imperial University of Dorpat to study chemistry and philosophy – he was taught among others by the philosopher – Gustav Teichmüller.

In April 1885 he experienced a breakthrough – one he himself described as the "discovery of the Self”. While reading Symposium by Plato, he had a mystical revelation – he discovered the existence and immortality of his own soul. In turn he “converted” to Platonism, which from then on stayed with him all his life. The event influenced his beliefs on the pre-existence of soul and palingenesis, which he proclaimed as a part of his philosophical reflection and started his long journey to Christianity. The same year Lutosławski travelled to Paris where he studied at École pratique des hautes études under the supervision of the philologist Gaston Paris.

In 1887 Lutosławski moved to Dorpat where he wrote his Masters’ thesis in philosophy but was unsuccessful in finding a job posting there. In 1888, thanks to the influence of the Polish linguist Jan Baudoin de Courtenay, he became a private associate professor in Kazań, where he taught psychology, metaphysics and history of philosophy. In the following years, Lutosławski travelled extensively in North America and Europe. He continued his studies on Plato (that he started in 1887) in places like the British Museum. The effect of these studies was his work, The Origin and Growth of Plato's Logic: With an Account of Plato's Style and of the Chronology of His Writings (London 1897). Thanks to the stylometric method, which involved the identification of stylistic differences, he was able to establish a certain chronology of the works written by the most famous student of Socrates.

While writing about Plato, Lutosławski tried to secure employment in what used to be Poland. Being unsuccessful at Jagiellonian University, in 1898 Lutosławski settled in a Galician town of Mera in Spain, where he hosted (among others) Tadeusz Miciński and Stanisław Przybyszewski. The same year he received his doctorate in philosophy from the University of Helsinki, based on his thesis Ueber die Grundvoraussertzungen und Consequenzen de Individualistichen Weltanschauung. Following this event, Lutosławski came to Krakow, where he was only offered the post of private associate professor.

When he lived in Krakow, Lutosławski was known for his extravagant behaviour – for example, wearing the attire of Polish Highlanders. During his lectures that lasted for many hours, Lutosławski often proclaimed radical social slogans and attacked philosophical positivism as well as pessimism, nihilism, partitioning authorities and so‐called Stańczycy (Habsburg loyalists). That worried the university authorities, who ordered him to be placed under surveillance. As a result, Dr. Karol Żuławski declared the philosopher to be suffering from severe psychiatric problems, and that combined with his political / philosophical beliefs led to his suspension from academic activity.

In 1899, on the invitation by Zygmunt Balicki, Lutosławski became a member of National League, a secret national-democratic organisation. He was active in it until 1910 and participated in the organisational work – as the commissioner of the Central Committee he set up the branch of the League in Poznan. He maintained a good relationship with the politicians of that option (particularly with Balicki), who often visited him both in his Krakow apartment as well as in Drozdowo.

In 1903 Lutosławski founded the Eleusis, which promoted Catholic national upbringing in the spirit of the romantic poets as well as freedom, meant as moral freedom, that was achieved through asceticism, discipline, exercises of will and abstinence from gambling, sex, tobacco and alcohol. The association published several magazines that supported their ideas – like a yearly “Eleusis” or “Iskra” (Spark). They recruited their members mainly from young representatives of intelligentsia or labourers in Upper Silesia, where the association spread the word about Polish national identity and patriotic sentiments. Lutosławski personally participated in the process of education. The organisation also had significant influence over the scouts movement, as its founders belonged to the association.

The beginning of the 20th century saw Lutosławski yet again travel across the globe with his lectures. He went to the US, where he held over 100 of the lectures. Between 1904 and 1906 he taught Polish literature at the University College in London. He also got interested in yoga, which he later practised – that in turn helped him overcome his neurosis. His interest resulted in the first Polish handbook on yoga, Rozwój potęgi woli (eng. Development of the Willpower), written in 1904 but published five years later. In his book Lutosławski outlined the programme of moral development through psychological and physical exercises. As a result, Lutosławski is considered the first Polish yogi. The yogic experiences described by Lutosławski in personal letters to William James provided an inspiration for James’ paper The Energies of Men.

=== World War I ===
Between 1912 and 1916 Lutosławski lived in Switzerland, where in Chateau Barby he founded Kuźnica (eng. Forge), a place where Poles could seek shelter and education. During this period, he also taught at the University of Geneva. After the First World War outbreak, Lutosławski wanted to join Polish Legions, but Balicki successfully dissuaded him from the idea. Between 1916 and 1919 he lived in Paris and patriotically motivated, he closely collaborated with Polish organisations – he wrote pamphlets and press articles on the case of Polish independence – for English, French, American and Polish newspapers.

=== Interbellum ===
After the First World War, Lutosławski got himself involved in the works of the Polish Congress Bureau in Versailles – the Polish expert committee that prepared the materials for Polish politicians. He was highly regarded there, particularly thanks to his fluent knowledge of English and he worked especially closely with Eugeniusz Romer, an ethnographer. His duties included publishing brochures in English on the borders of Poland – he supported the return to the pre-partition borders as well as the incorporation of Masuria and Gdańsk to Poland. He opposed the border plebiscites and fought against bolshevik ideology, by publishing about it. He declared his negative opinions on the treaties that extended the appreciation for ethnic minorities in Poland.

On his return from Paris, on 25 August 1919, Lutosławski managed to secure the post of associate professor at Stefan Batory University in Vilnius, where he went on to teach logic, psychology, ethics and metaphysics. A year later, he became a professor at this university. It was at this university where he had his first „disciple” – Benedykt Woyczyński. In 1925 Woyczyński wrote his doctorate on the subject of soul in the works of Plato. Even prior to his doctorate, as a member of the philosophical seminar, together with Lutosławski he participated in the Convention of Philosophers in Lwow. He was not a Messianist, but he shared his mentor's deep faith in Christianity, which was able to transform the world. He died in 1927.

In time free from the didactic work, Lutisławski often held public lectures – both in Poland (for example – for the army, thanks to personal permission of Józef Piłsudski and Kazimierz Sosnkowski) and abroad. After 1926, he used to lecture on the theory of national propriety at the events organised by Polska Macierz Szkolna. He was invited to do so by Józef Stemler, with whom he forged a friendship. In 1927 he participated in a pedagogical congress in Italy to promote nationalist Polish ideas. It was there where he debated with the eminent French philosopher – Henri Bergson, whom he had known previously. Around the same time, on his travels to England he got to know Gilbert K. Chesterton and the historian Arnold J. Toynbee.

After 1926 Lutosławski formed a negative opinion on Józef Piłsudski, and declared him a person with no mental or moral qualities for the important roles in the state. Because of these opinions that he put in a little book Tajemnica powszechnego dobrobytu (eng. The Secret of the Universal Wellbeing), his work was censored before publishing and was not distributed. In 1929 Lutosławski retired from Stefan Batory University and in 1931 he moved to Paris. It was there where he started to write down his memoirs, later published as Jeden łatwy żywot (eng. One Easy Life). In 1933 he settled in Dzięgielów near Cieszyn, and a year later in Krakow, where he lived until his death.

=== World War II ===
During the Second World War Lutosławski barely left his apartment, thus avoiding the fate of many Krakow academics who got arrested and sent to Sachsenhausen camp. His worries were mainly of a financial nature and that forced him to sell some of the books from his collection. He could however count on the help of his son, who used to send food packages to the family. As Janina Lutosławska recollects, during that period, her father often served as a symbol of encouragement to those who encountered him.

=== Postwar period ===
Lutosławski criticised the new authorities, he thought they were striving to convert Poland into yet another Soviet republic. Between 1946 and 1948 he held free private lectures at Jagiellonian University. In 1948 he wanted the university to reinstate him as associate professor but he was refused – again. In 1948 he managed to deliver a speech at the 10th Philosophy Congress in Amsterdam. He polished his metaphysical system then, but did not publish a book on the subject. The book was only published in the 21st century – Metafizyka (eng. Metaphysics), Drozdowo 2004.

Lutosławski died on 28 December 1954. Before his death, he made peace with Sofia Casanova and prepared a document in which he renounced all his beliefs that could contradict the teachings of the Catholic Church. He was buried at Krakow Salwator Cemetery.

== Philosophy ==
Wincenty Lutosławski coined the term "stylometry". A multilingual philosopher, he used literary analysis to establish the chronology of Plato's writings.

It can be described through nationalistic Messianism and eleuterism – metaphysical spiritualist pluralism stemming from the philosophy of Plato. He combined them with Catholicism, programme of moral renewal and individualism. In his opinion eleuterism found its fullness in Christianity, that taught the value of every human soul, that was created by God. In his metaphysics Lutosławski claimed that the spiritual sphere is the primary and securely existing one. The materialistic sphere can be narrowed down to the phenomena. Lutosławski claimed that a human is equipped with fully free will and that we consist of two monads: spiritual, primary one and lower one – a body. Additionally, he supported the ideas of the pre-existence of soul as well as the palingenesis – a cyclical return of the same souls to earth in various human shapes. Lutosławski was the avid defender and admirer of Polish romanticism, he thought of himself as the heir who got his inspiration from the ideas of Andrzej Towiański, Józef Hoene-Wroński or August Cieszkowski. He wrote about Juliusz Słowacki, declaring him the author of the spiritualist evolution concept (in opposition to Charles Darwin). This concept involved an immaterial spirit that took on the shape of various species. His Messianism had eschatological perspective and was meant to bring the human race to perfection. It was meant to be achieved by religious transformation of a human and that transformation would also happen at the social, economic and international levels. He perceived the nation as the highest form of human existence, as a spiritual community, that has its mission to fulfill in the world. It was the soul that would create a nation – soul as a self-conscious self rather than a historical heritage or geographical location. The nations formed a certain type of hierarchy and a special mission was ascribed to Poles – nation of Christ. Lutosławski combined all that with the democratic concept of the state.

Lutosławski's metaphysical system was inspired by Gottfried Wilhelm Leibniz's Monad philosophy and incorporated the doctrine of metempsychosis. He believed in a continuous hierarchy of souls as a great chain of being with God at its apex. The souls of humans were considered on a higher scale to animals but lower than creatures with a higher developed soul than humans. He held the view that each soul could morally improve or decline and change species from human to animal in the course of reincarnation.

Because of the contradictions his concept had with the teachings of the Catholic Church, Lutosławski, until his very death was often criticised by orthodox Catholics. Trying to resolve the issue, in later years Lutosławski exchanged letters with Belgian Thomistic philosopher – cardinal. Desire Joseph Mercier, who assured him that his beliefs are not heretical.

In the Second Republic of Poland he continued to proclaim spiritualistic metaphysics and Messianism. He mused on the issue of Polish culture, where he judged individualism as the most important factor. He stated that Poles as a nation have a special relationship with God, thanks to national prophets (poets). The mission of the Polish nation was the creation of God's kingdom on Earth, a kingdom that also looked after the materialistic side of human beings and after the international community. The role of the Poles was also the proclamation of universal values: tolerance, individual freedom, charity, Christianity, strong social bonds. They were to ensure that every single individual self in the world could identify itself with its nation. The degree of such identification could eventually lead to the abolition of certain states, whose existence is often the cause of conflict between them.

Lutosławski criticised the Lwow-Warsaw School, which dominated Polish philosophy. He harshly criticized Kazimierz Twardowski himself, calling him a German scholar – this, despite Twardowski having privately tried to help him and had arranged for him to lecture in Lwów. Others were equally critical of Lutosławski. Władysław Tatarkiewicz proposed banning Lutosławski from representing Polish philosophy abroad; and in May 1923 Tadeusz Kotarbiński wanted to remove him from the committee of the First All-Polish Philosophical Congress in Lwów.

== Private life ==
In 1886, in Spain, Lutosławski met the eminent Galician poet and writer Sofía Casanova. They married on 19 March 1886 and had four daughters: Maria (born 1888), Izabela (born 1889), Jadwiga (born 1891), and Halina (born 1897). The marriage was troubled for a number of reasons, including Jadwiga's death in 1895. Lutosławski had contributed to her death by believing he could cure his daughter's illness with his own energy. The last year Lutosławski and Sofia Casanova could be considered a couple was 1903; they most likely never received a formal divorce or annulment.

On 29 June 1912, Lutosławski married again, in Verdun, France, to Wanda Peszyńska, a member of Eleusis. That second marriage was far happier. The following year the long-awaited son, Tadeusz, was born; he later became a diplomat in England and changed his name to Aleksander Jordan. In 1922 the couple's second child was born: Janina, later an English philologist.

In 1897, in England, Lutosławski interviewed Joseph Conrad. Lutosławski's account, published in St. Petersburg, Russia, in the Polish weekly Kraj, and the ensuing controversy involving the novelist Eliza Orzeszkowa, caused Conrad much distress. He developed a lasting hatred for Orzeszkowa, who accused him of deserting his native Poland. Conrad thereafter adamantly refused to read her novels.

== Works ==
- Principes de stylométrie (1890)
- O logice Platona (I–II, Kraków 1891–1892, I: O tradycyi tekstu Platona, II: Dotychczasowe poglądy na logikę Platona i zadania dalszych badań nad tym przedmiotem)
- O pierwszych trzech tetralogiach dzieł Platona (Kraków 1896)
- The Origin and Growth of Plato's Logic. With an Account of Plato's Style and of the Chronology of His Writings (1897)
- Platon jako twórca idealizmu (Warsaw 1899)
- Źródła pesymizmu (Kraków 1899)
- Z dziedziny myśli. Studja filozoficzne. 1888–1899 (Kraków 1900)
- Wykłady Jagiellońskie (I–II, Kraków 1901–1902)
- The Polish Nation (Berlin 1908)
- Gdańsk and East Prussia (1919)
- Lithuania and White Ruthenia (1919)
- The Ruthenian Question in Galicia (1919)
- Bolshevism and Poland (1919)
- The World of Souls (1924)
- Pre-existence and Reincarnation (1928)
- The Knowledge of Reality (1930)

== See also ==
- History of philosophy in Poland
- Joseph Conrad, interviewed by Lutosławski, to Conrad's regret
- List of Poles
