= Drozdowo, Podlaskie Voivodeship =

Drozdowo
- Village
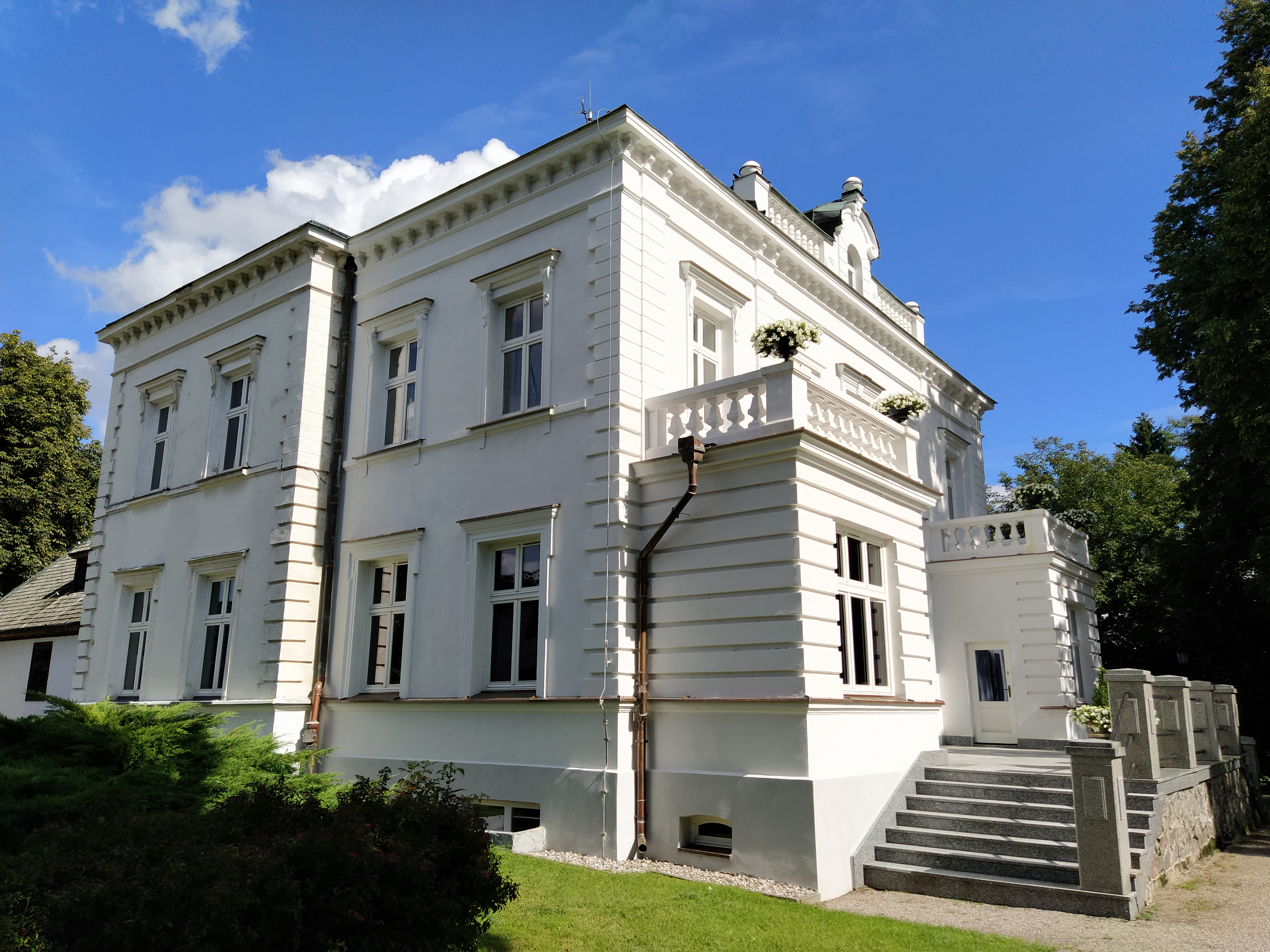
- Lutosławski manor in Drozdowo

- Location within Poland
- Coordinates: 53°9′8″N 22°10′23″E
- Country: Poland
- Voivodeship: Podlaskie
- County: Łomża
- Gmina: Piątnica

Population
  - Total: 690
- Time zone: UTC+1 (CET)
  - Summer (DST): UTC+2 (CEST)
- Vehicle registration: BLM

Drozdowo [drɔzˈdɔvɔ] is a village in the administrative district of Gmina Piątnica, within Łomża County, Podlaskie Voivodeship, in north-eastern Poland.

== History ==
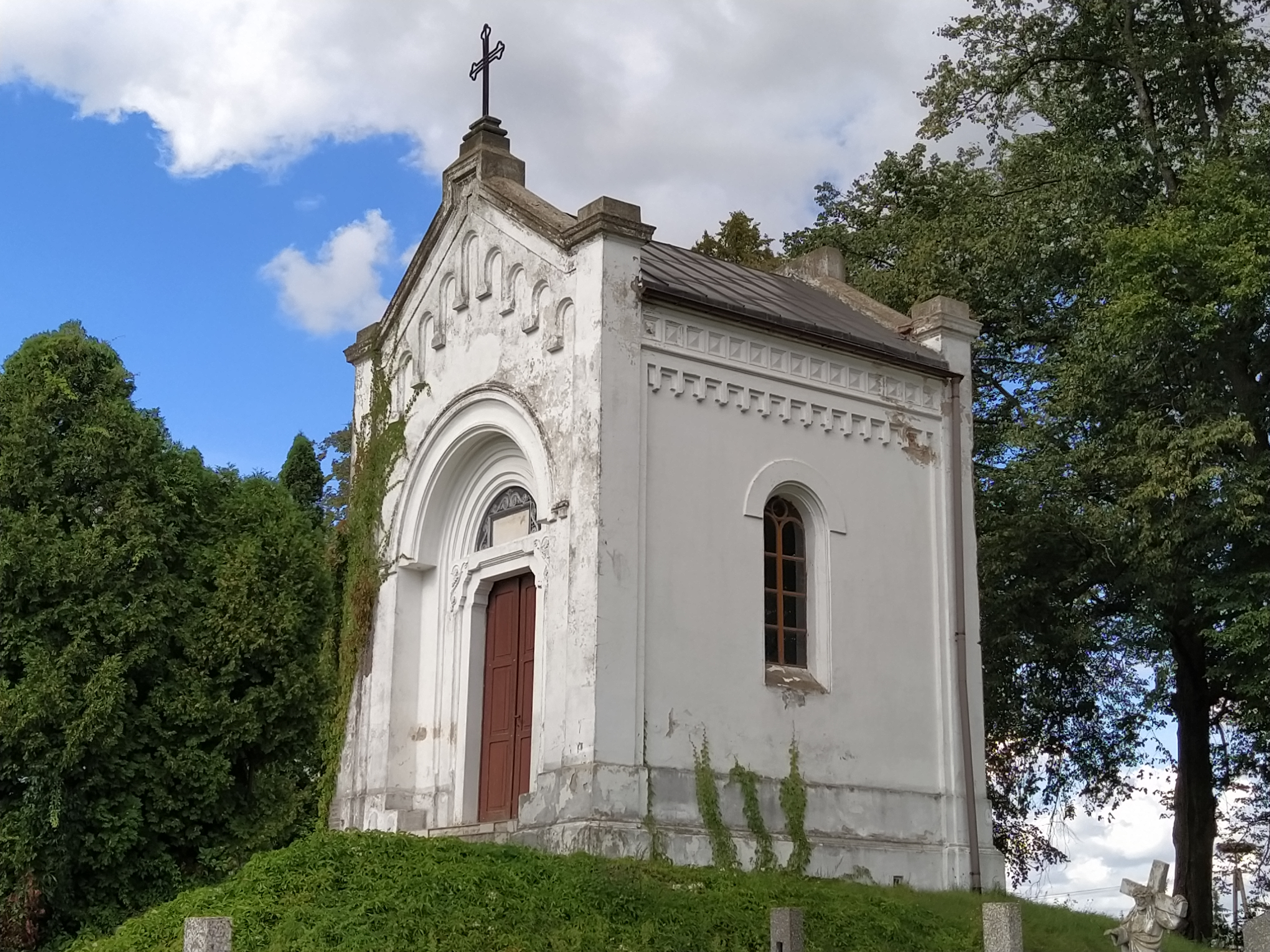
Burial chapel of Lutosławski Family

The first mentions of Drozdowo come from as far back as 1417. By the middle of the 19th century, the town and surrounding land belonged to the estates of the Lutosławski noble family. Starting from 1864, Drozdowo had a functional brewery, the product of which quickly became well known in the area, thanks to access to pristine water and expert workers. Drozdowo beer was awarded first prize at competitions in Warsaw in 1867 and Vienna in 1873, opening the markets for it both in the Polish Kingdom and abroad. It was later awarded first prize at similar competitions in Philadelphia in 1876 and Paris in 1878.

Drozdowo was on the fronts of World War I and II. Already after WW I the extent of damage was so big that neither the estates nor brewery ever regained their former grandeur. After the war, most of the inhabitants of Drozdowo resided to farming, and the last members of the Lutosławski family left the village in 1979.

Following the German-Soviet invasion of Poland, which started World War II in September 1939, the village was initially occupied by the Soviet Union until 1941, and then by Germany until 1944. Four Polish citizens were murdered by Nazi Germany in the village during World War II. Afterwards, it was restored to Poland, although with a Soviet-installed communist regime, which stayed in power until the Fall of Communism in the 1980s. The Polish anti-communist resistance was active in Drozdowo, and in 1945 it raided a local communist police station.

== People associated with Drozdowo ==
- Witold Lutosławski (1913–1994), Polish composer and orchestral conductor
- Marian Lutosławski (1871–1918), Polish engineer, bridge builder and inventor
- Wincenty Lutosławski (1863–1954), Polish philosopher and author
- Roman Dmowski (1864–1939), Polish politician
