= Scouting cross =

Emblem of Polish Scouting

Scouting Cross
- Polish: Krzyż harcerski
- Owner: Polish Scouting Association
- Country: Poland
- Created: 1912
- Founder: Kazimierz Lutosławski

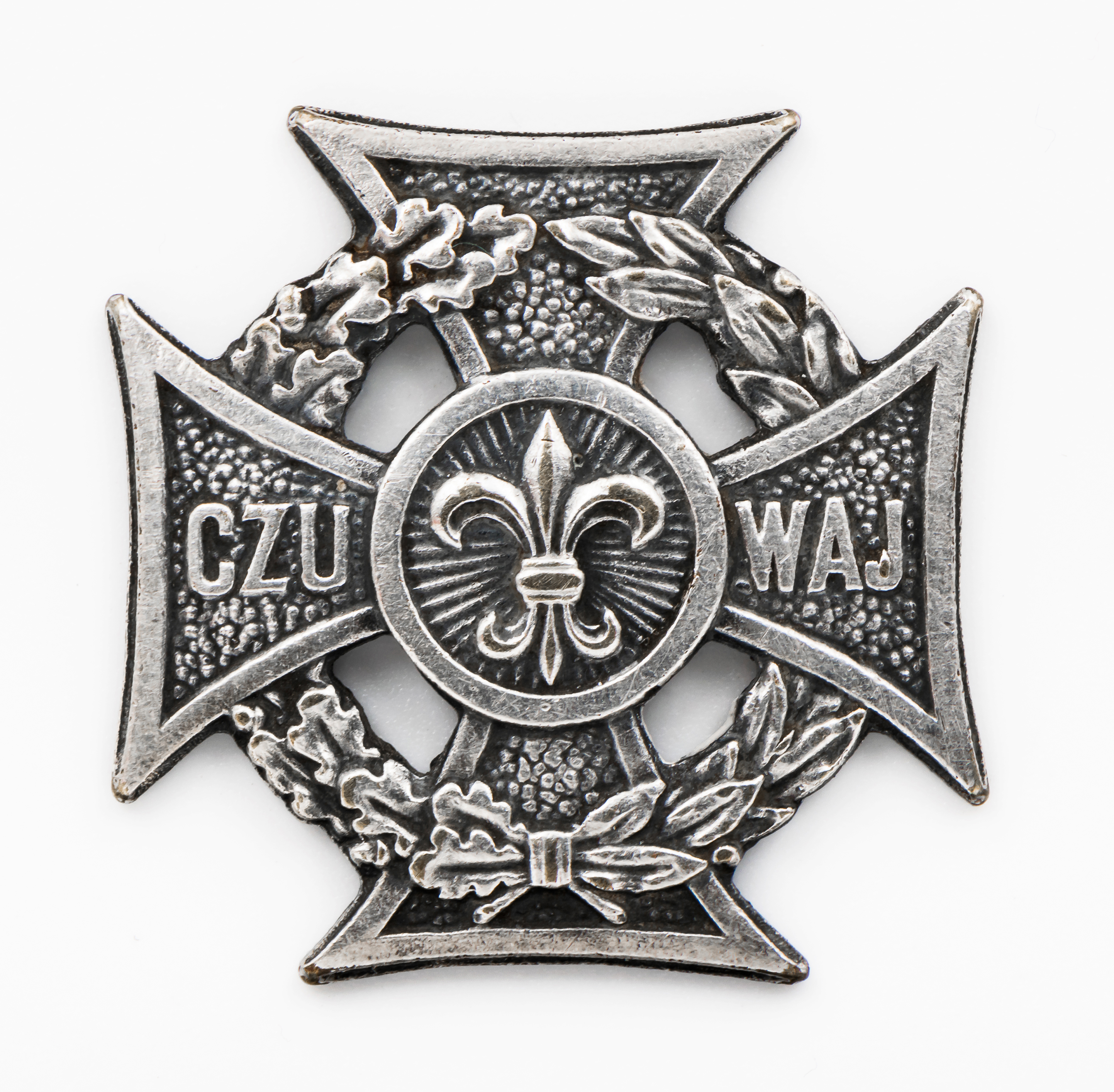
Scouting Cross No 87 MW MET - 1973

Krzyż harcerski (Polish for Scouts Cross) is the emblem of Polish Scouting, awarded to Polish Scouts, Senior Scouts and Rangers. It was first used by an underground Scouting organization in Warsaw in 1913. The initial design by Kazimierz Lutosławski has not been modified substantially since then. It is worn on a Scout uniform, over the heart, two fingers above the left pocket.

In November 1918 the Polish Ministry of War decreed that the Krzyż Harcerski was the only civilian honour that may be worn on military uniforms. The tradition continues to this day.

== Symbols ==
The Cross was designed by Catholic priest Kazimierz Lutosławski, uncle of Polish composer Witold Lutosławski. The shape of the Cross is a symbol of a hard way that should always be followed. It also bears resemblance to Virtuti Militari, the highest Polish military medal, a symbol of bravery and indomitability.

The central point of the Cross is the Fleur-de-lys, an ancient symbol of virtue and purity. It is used worldwide as a symbol of the Scouting Movement (see Fleur-de-lis in Scouting). In Polish Scouts Movement it is also worn as stand alone button on the uniform's cap. The letters ONC on the wings of the emblem stand for "Ojczyzna, Nauka, Cnota" (Polish for "Homeland, Education, Virtue"). The middle wing with the letter N also symbolizes the compass that should guide every Scout through his or her life. The fleur-de-lys on the Scouts Cross does not bear the letters ONC, which have been replaced by two stars, emblematic of a Scout's wide-open eyes.

The fleur-de-lys is surrounded by a circle or a ring, symbolizing both perfection and scout unity. The rays inside the ring signify the Latin phrase, "per aspera ad astra" ("through hardships to the stars").

The wreath around the centre of the Cross is composed of two parts. To the left there is a chain of oak leaves which symbolise strength, courage, heroism and agility. To the right there is a chain of laurel leaves — symbol of victory. A Scout is to achieve victories over one's own weaknesses rather than over an enemy. Thus the laurel leaves signify also the knowledge and proficiency. The tie between both chains is to remind every Scout to commit good deeds every day.

The arms of the cross are filled with grains of sand. Their purpose is to symbolise both the multitude of Scouts on Earth and stones that are thrown on the road of a Scout by fate. The word Czuwaj (Polish for Be vigilant) is the motto and greeting of Polish Scouts.
