= Sokol District =

Sokol District район Сокол (Russian)
- District
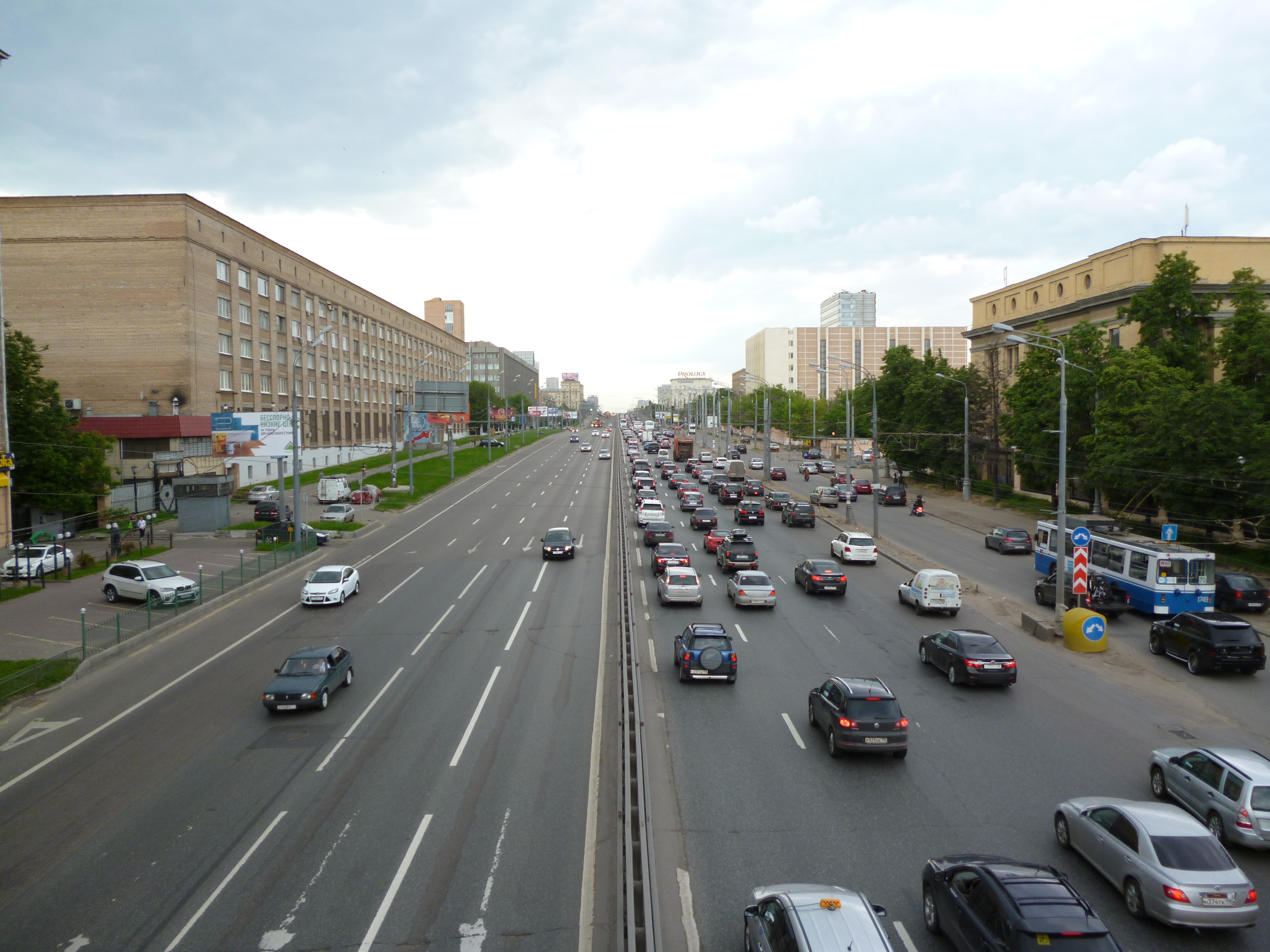
- Leningradskoye Highway in Sokol District

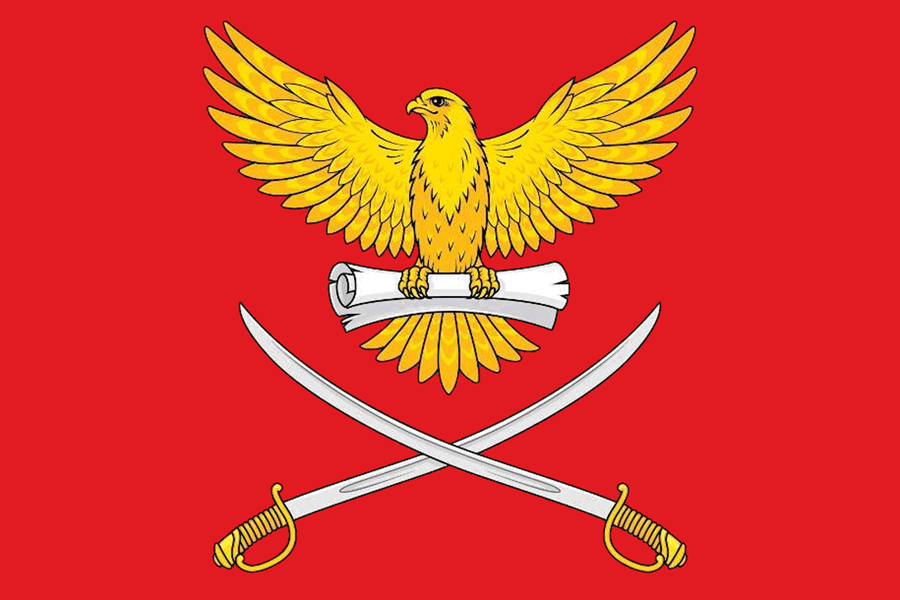
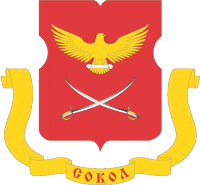
- Flag Coat of arms
- Location of Sokol District in Moscow (pre-2012 map)
- Coordinates: 55°48′N 37°30′E
- Country: Russia
- Federal subject: federal city of Moscow

Area
  - Total: 3.05 km^{2} (1.18 sq mi)

Population (2010 Census)
  - Total: 57,133
  - Density: 18,700/km^{2} (48,500/sq mi)

Municipal structure
  - Municipally incorporated as: Sokol Municipal Okrug
- Time zone: UTC+
- OKTMO ID: 45345000
- Website: http://sokol.mos.ru

Population of Sokol District
- 2010 Census: 57,133
- 2002 Census: 57,317

Sokol District (Russian: райо́н Со́кол) is an administrative district (raion), one of the sixteen in Northern Administrative Okrug of the federal city of Moscow, Russia. The area of the district is 3.05 square kilometres (1.18 mi^{2}) As of the 2010 Census, the total population of the district was 57,133.

== History ==
The district is named after the settlement of Sokol built in the 1920s. Earlier, the village of Vsekhsvyatskoye existed at the same location. During the Red Terror, mass executions of suspected counterrevolutionaries and various political opponents were conducted here at a local cemetery, which is now a memorial complex. In 1938, Sokol metro station opened here.

== Sokol in Current Moscow ==
It has 3 parks, multiple top-tier schools and after school activities such as volleyball and music school within walking distance. it is centrally located and is only a 20 minute drive from the center. Sokol also has the very first Moscow music school, named after Dunayevsky.

== Municipal status ==
As a municipal division, it is incorporated as Sokol Municipal Okrug.

== Local government ==
=== Municipal Assembly ===
The Municipal Assembly is the representative body of the district. It consists of deputies elected in municipal elections by residents of the district. According to the results of the 2017 elections, 10 people entered the Municipal Assembly. Among them, 5 were nominated by the Yabloko party, 3 representatives of the United Russia party, one representative of the Communist Party of the Russian Federation, and one independent. The head of the municipal district and the chairman of the Council of Deputies of the municipal district is Nikolai Stepanov.

== Education ==
- Moscow Aviation Institute
- Stroganov Moscow State University of Arts and Industry
- Moscow State University of Food Production
- Moscow University of Industry and Finance

== Science and technology ==
- GSKB Almaz-Antey
- Hydroproject

== Sightseeing ==
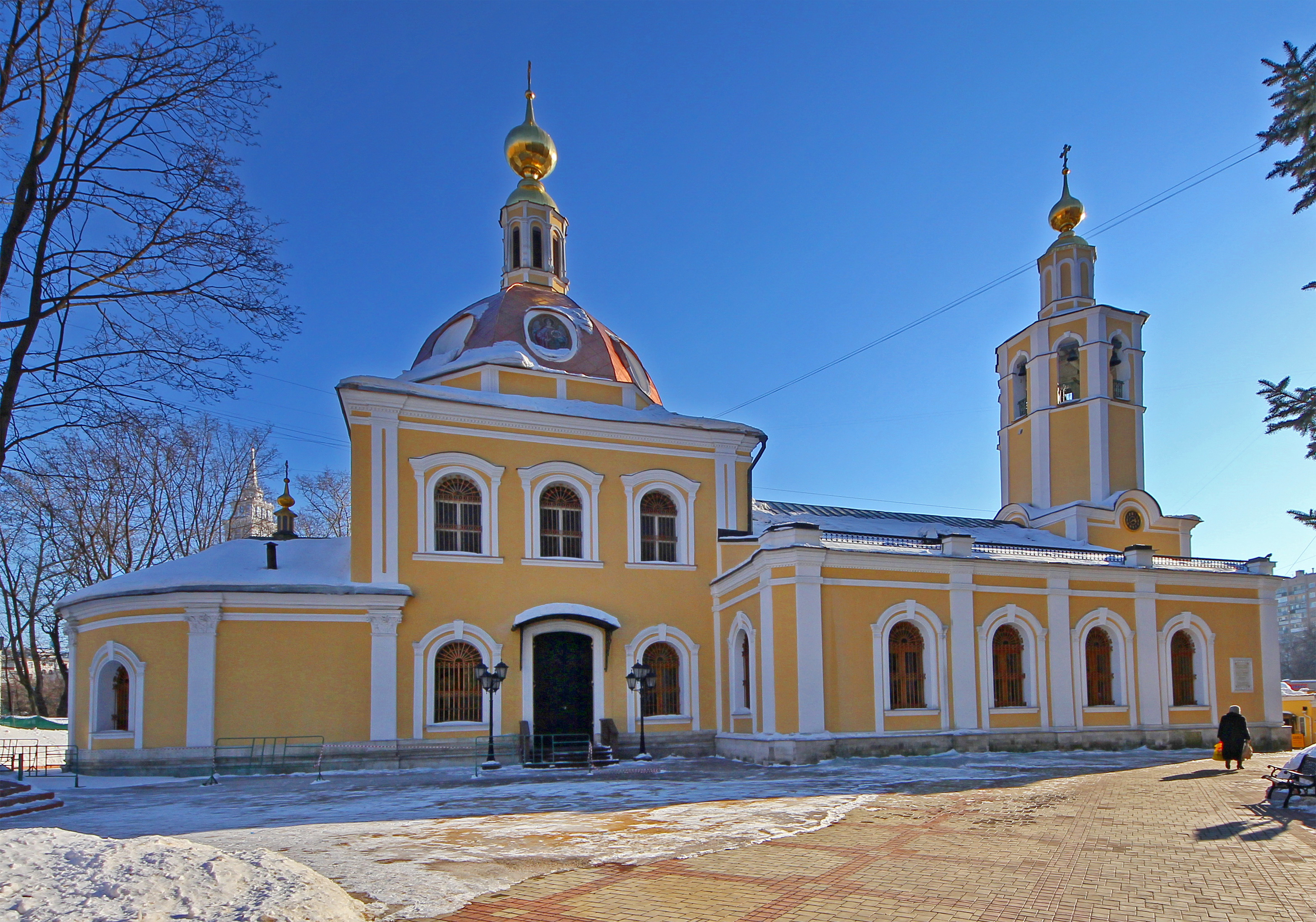
Church of All Saints

- Church of All Saints at Vsekhsvyatskoye (1733–1736)
- Memorial park of World War I victims (the former Moscow Brotherly Cemetery)
