= Marian Lutosławski =

Polish mechanical engineer and inventor

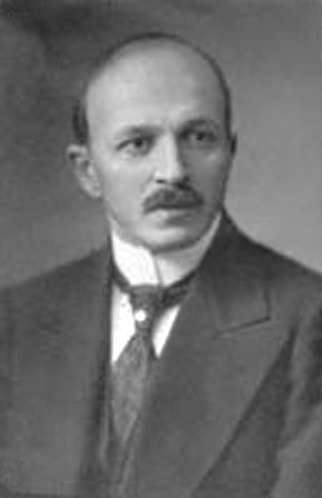
- Born: 1871; Drozdowo, Łomża Governorate, Congress Poland
- Died: 5 September 1918 (aged 46–47); Moscow
- Occupations: Mechanical engineer and inventor
- Known for: First diesel power station in Warsaw

Marian Lutosławski (1871 – 5 September 1918) was a Polish mechanical engineer and inventor born during the foreign partitions of Poland. He studied at the Technical University in Riga, then also part of Russia, and obtained a diploma in electrical engineering from the Technical University of Darmstadt in Germany. Lutosławski installed the first power station in a residential neighbourhood in Warsaw, and introduced new techniques such as the three-phase current. In 1900 he built the country's first power plant fueled by a diesel internal combustion engine for Hotel Bristol, Warsaw. He also designed the first two reinforced concrete bridges in Lublin in 1908 and 1909. Lutosławski was arrested in 1918 by the Bolsheviks, and was executed without trial near Moscow as a "counterrevolutionary".

== Life ==
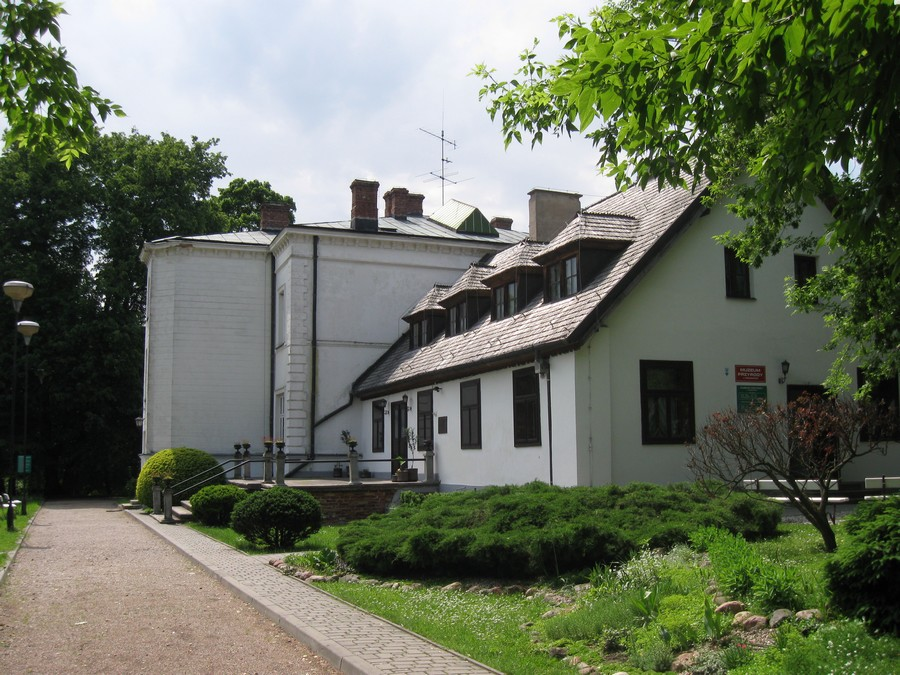
Lutosławski's family manor in Drozdowo, now a museum

Marian Lutosławski was born in 1871 at an estate in Drozdowo northeast of Warsaw to a Polish family. His parents were agronomist Franciszek Dionizy Lutosławski and his second wife Paulina, well-educated members of the landed gentry. Of Marian's five brothers, one would become a professor of philosophy, one a newspaper editor, and one a parliamentarian.

Lutosławski settled in Warsaw after completing his studies abroad and founded a factory called Grafit (Graphite) producing fire-resistant safes. In 1898 he married Maria Zielińska. He became a lecturer at the Warsaw Polytechnic Faculty of Mechanical Engineering (named the Wawelberg & Rotwand Technical School of Mechanics at the time).

Lutosławski was an avid community leader and worked for the Association of Engineers and other professional organizations. In 1902 he founded a technical office expanding his activities into the construction industry, particularly reinforced concrete design. He built the first reinforced concrete House in Warsaw. He used reinforced concrete in the construction of the Church of Christ the Saviour in Vilnius in present-day Lithuania, and many other projects including bridges based on the new François Hennebique technology. The two bridges he built in Lublin are now considered world's RC technical Heritage Monuments (No A/956). Based on his experience, Lutosławski gave lectures and courses and wrote articles and manuals in civil engineering.

=== Social activism and death ===
In addition to his business activities Lutosławski was a member of the Polish National Democratic Party and co-founder of the student society Macierz Szkolna. He was one of the initiators of the new Citizens' Committee as well as the Polish Committee for Sanitary Aid (Polski Komitet Pomocy Sanitarnej, PKPS) at the beginning of World War I. In 1915, during World War I, most of the Lutosławski family fled to Russia after Poland was occupied by German forces. There, he and his brother Józef organized Polish military forces hoping to liberate Poland with the help of Tsarist Russia. He represented the Central Committee of the PKPS in Moscow in order to help Poles expelled from Congress Poland return to their re-emerging nation. His activities included setting up Polish day care, workshops, hospitals, and centers of assistance and medical care abroad. In 1917, the Russian Revolution broke out. The National Democratic Party, to which Marian and Józef Lutosławski belonged, was strongly opposed to Bolshevik rule. Marian helped evacuate Polish refugees through Murmansk to France and England. He also supported a revolt by Polish forces in Murmansk against the communists. For this, Marian Lutosławski was arrested by the Bolsheviks in Murmansk on 23 April 1918 on suspicion of being a counterrevolutionary. He was taken to Moscow along with his brother Józef, who was arrested two days after him.

Marian was executed without trial in a mass execution on 5 September 1918 in Vsekhsvyatskoye, a secluded village outside of Moscow, together with his brother, several days before his trial was supposed to take place.

== Family ==
His marriage to Maria née Zielinska produced two sons, Franciszek and Zbigniew, and two daughters, Hanna and Zofia. Witold Lutosławski, one of the major European composers of the 20th century, was Lutosławski's nephew. Witold Lutosławski was five years old when his father Józef (born 1882) and Marian were killed.

== Publications ==
- O zastosowaniu prądów zmiennych o wysokim napięciu do celów motorycznych (On the use of alternating currents of high voltage for powering motor), 1896, engineering manual
- Prąd elektryczny – jego wytwarzanie i zastosowanie (Electric current - its production and use), 1900
- Nowy system głębokiego fundamentowania na gruntach niepewnych (The new system of deep foundation building in uncertain soil), 1907
- Pale betonowe Simplex do fundamentowania na gruntach niepewnych (Simplex concrete piles for foundations in uncertain soil), 1908

== See also ==
- Poles in the Soviet Union
