= 2024 Moscow City Duma election =

Regional election in Moscow, Russia

- 6–8 September 2024

All 45 seats in the City Duma 23 seats needed for a majority
- Turnout: 40.32% ▲18.55 pp
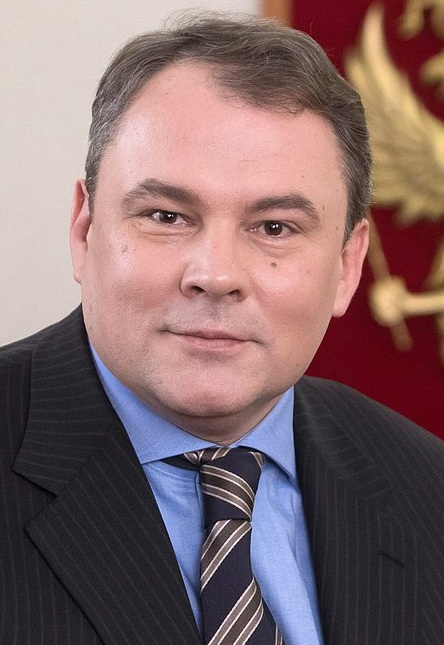

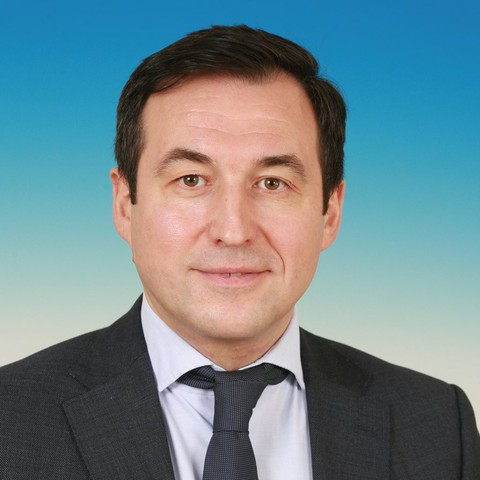
	Majority party	Minority party	Third party
		CPRF
Leader	Pyotr Tolstoy	Nikolay Zubrilin	Dmitry Gusev
Party	United Russia	CPRF	SR-ZP
Leader's seat	Not running	District 10	Not running
Last election	Did not participate (Note: 19 United Russia members were elected as Independents)	13 seats	3 seats
Seats won	38	3	1
Seat change	Did not participate	▼10	▼2
	Fourth party	Fifth party	Sixth party
	NL	LDPR	CPCR
Leader	Yevgeny Isak	Roman Krastelev	Yaroslav Sidorov
Party	New People	LDPR	Communists of Russia
Leader's seat	Not running	District 45	Not running
Last election	Did not exist	0 seats	0 seats
Seats won	1	0	0
Seat change	Did not exist	Steady	Steady
Chairman before election
Aleksey Shaposhnikov
United Russia
Elected Chairman
Aleksey Shaposhnikov
United Russia

The 2024 Moscow City Duma election took place on 6–8 September 2024, on common election day. All 45 seats in the City Duma were up for reelection.

United Russia won a resounding victory in the election, winning 38 seats and doubling its faction, after standing its candidates as Independents last cycle. Other parties represented in the Moscow City Duma, including Communist Party of the Russian Federation and A Just Russia – For Truth, suffered heavy losses with Yabloko losing its entire four-member delegation after failing to collect enough signatures for any of its candidates (including two incumbents). New People entered the Duma for the first time with a single deputy. While Liberal Democratic Party of Russia failed to win any seat on their own, two LDPR-aligned Independents got elected (although both were members of United Russia at the time of the election).

== Background ==
The 2019 Moscow City Duma election was marked by mass protests in the city, sparked by the disqualification of several candidates allied to Alexei Navalny, Dmitry Gudkov, Yabloko or local citizen movements. The subsequent backlash and Smart Voting tactic, proposed by Navalny's Team, resulted in Mayor Sergey Sobyanin-backed Independents winning a slim majority of just 25 seats in the 45-member Moscow City Duma and losing the popular vote to CPRF (although in at least three constituencies Mayoral Office backed Communist candidates). Pro-government forces in the City Duma established two factions – United Russia (19 members) and My Moscow (5 members), (Note: Andrey Medvedev remained unaffiliated) while opposition was represented by Communist Party (13 members), Yabloko (4 members) and A Just Russia (3 members).

The first change in the Duma composition occurred in August 2020, when Communist Vice Speaker Nikolay Gubenko from District 37 died after struggling with illness. In October 2020 another Communist member, Oleg Sheremetyev of District 19, left the chamber as he was expelled after being found guilty of fraud. Both vacant seats were filled in the 2021 by-elections: pediatrician and municipal deputy Yelena Kats flipped District 19 for United Russia, and former State Duma member Vladimir Ryzhkov – District 37 for Yabloko. Ryzhkov, however, left Russia in summer 2022 and officially resigned from the Duma in late January 2024, leaving his seat vacant until the next convocation.

In March 2021 deputies Yelena Shuvalova (District 44) and Dmitry Loktev (District 2) were expelled from the CPRF faction in the City Duma for "systematically discrediting the faction". Shuvalova was previously expelled from the party in June 2020 for regular insubordination, including failure to pay party fees, challenging faction leader Nikolay Zubrilin, and collaboration with liberal opposition, while Loktev was removed in February 2021 for voting against city budget. A third Communist deputy, Yevgeny Stupin (District 20), was expelled from the party in March 2023, a month later he was sacked from the faction and later left Russia. Three Moscow City Duma members were also declared foreign agents by the Ministry of Justice: Darya Besedina (Yabloko) in January 2023, Yevgeny Stupin (CPRF) and Mikhail Timonov (A Just Russia) in June 2023. On May 8, 2024 during the second to last 7th Moscow City Duma session Stupin was expelled for truancy after leaving Russia in September 2023 and failing to attend any Duma session since. On May 15, 2024 President Vladimir Putin signed a law, which prohibits foreign agents to run in any elections in Russia until the status of foreign agents is revoked. For current Moscow City Duma deputies it only applied to Timonov, who had not publicly announced his intentions, as Besedina had already decided to retire, while Stupin was expelled.

With the last Moscow redistricting occurring in 2014, a new Moscow City Duma map should be enacted for the 2024 election. In late December 2023 a new district map was proposed and later enacted by the Moscow City Duma. The new map was heavily criticised as gerrymandered by the deputies themselves, especially considering that under the enacted map districts of Sergey Mitrokhin, Mikhail Timonov, Yekaterina Yengalycheva and Lyubov Nikitina were virtually eliminated.

== Electoral system ==
Under current election laws, the City Duma is elected for a term of five years by first-past-the-post voting in 45 constituencies. Currently Moscow is the only federal subject of Russia using full majoritarian system to elect members of the regional legislature.

== Candidates ==
45 single-mandate constituencies were formed in Moscow. To register candidates in single-mandate constituencies need to collect 3% of signatures of registered voters in the constituency.

The following parties were relieved from the necessity to collect signatures:

- United Russia
- Communist Party of the Russian Federation
- A Just Russia — Patriots — For Truth
- Liberal Democratic Party of Russia
- New People

Number of candidates in single-mandate constituencies
Party	Candidates	
Party	Nominated	Registered
United Russia	43	41
Communist Party	45	42
A Just Russia – For Truth	45	44
Liberal Democratic Party	43	42
New People	48	44
Communists of Russia	25	21
The Greens	19	7
Yabloko	23	0
Russian All-People's Union (Note: Failed the certification)	–	–
Party of Russia's Rebirth	–	–
Civic Initiative	–	–
Independent	98	40
Total	389	281

New People took part in the regularly scheduled Moscow legislative election for the first time, while United Russia would return after not standing its candidates last cycle. Rodina and Civilian Power, who participated in the last election, did not file their candidates, while Party of Growth, National Course, People's Alliance, Revival of Agrarian Russia and Party of the Parents of Future had been dissolved prior. As all Yabloko candidates, including two incumbent Moscow City Duma members, failed to collect the sufficient number of signatures, the party was slated to lose its entire four-member faction.

== Opinion polling ==
Fieldwork date	Polling firm	Sample size	CPRF	UR	SRZP	LDPR	Yabloko	NP	CI	Ind.	Others	Undecided	Abstention	Lead
16–18 Aug 2024	Russian Field	1,000	7.9	36.8	2.1	8.4	3.0	5.4	0.5	3.0	0.0	21.7	9.6	28.4
16–18 Aug 2024	Russian Field	438	12.8	58.4	3.7	9.6	4.1	8.0	0.7	2.7	0.0	–	–	45.6
8 Sep 2019	2019 election		32.62	32.35	12.85	9.02	4.13	New	DNP	2.73	6.30		(78.23)	0.27

== Summary of the results ==
Summary of the 6–8 September 2024 Moscow City Duma election results
Party	Seats	+/–
United Russia	38	New
Communist Party	3	▼10
A Just Russia — For Truth	1	▼2
New People	1	New
Liberal Democratic Party	0	Steady
Communists of Russia	0	Steady
The Greens	0	Steady
Independents	2	▼24

Party results by district
District	UR	CPRF	SRZP	LDPR	NL	CR	Grn.	Ind.
1st	49.96	10.96	9.19	8.77	15.76	5.33	—N/a	—N/a
2nd	53.33	8.12	9.66	6.77	12.32	4.78	4.99	—N/a
3rd	51.95	6.00	6.03	9.27	7.14	4.89	—N/a	14.67
4th	53.76	12.80	3.97	6.54	7.43	4.35	4.51	6.54
5th	44.19	17.41	7.71	11.76	12.35	6.54	—N/a	—N/a
6th	54.09	11.93	14.86	5.29	8.92	—N/a	—N/a	4.88
7th	46.67	12.97	6.22	8.01	9.62	—N/a	11.17	5.30
8th	55.38	7.79	12.95	8.56	11.49	3.76	—N/a	—N/a
9th	50.03	10.76	7.31	13.58	6.49	—N/a	—N/a	11.77
10th	27.18	33.67	8.38	20.15	10.59	—N/a	—N/a	—N/a
11th	57.20	8.30	4.92	10.17	5.39	7.26	—N/a	6.70
12th	43.27	14.76	—N/a	9.49	10.50	6.27	—N/a	15.67
13th	47.64	12.24	7.81	9.83	9.64	—N/a	—N/a	12.78
14th	44.32	11.61	6.02	18.00	8.23	—N/a	5.57	5.84
15th	—N/a	11.40	14.54	33.95	18.33	14.01	—N/a	7.68
16th	—N/a	18.05	34.29	16.13	—N/a	8.59	—N/a	22.87
17th	—N/a	31.58	23.13	22.83	22.32	—N/a	—N/a	—N/a
18th	50.24	10.74	10.14	9.57	8.87	—N/a	—N/a	10.39
19th	38.99	8.30	5.34	13.29	9.21	—N/a	3.55	8.75
20th	26.63	33.07	10.51	15.21	14.51	—N/a	—N/a	—N/a
21st	59.15	—N/a	10.05	12.32	15.42	—N/a	—N/a	3.06
22nd	49.48	13.89	11.13	8.75	10.12	—N/a	—N/a	6.60
23rd	55.52	—N/a	10.40	8.04	12.66	—N/a	—N/a	13.31
24th	50.06	7.95	5.98	8.62	16.87	5.30	5.20	—N/a
25th	51.85	12.19	7.31	—N/a	11.28	9.66	—N/a	7.68
26th	58.99	11.92	6.47	8.06	8.55	—N/a	—N/a	5.96
27th	48.21	11.77	9.92	10.60	8.64	—N/a	—N/a	10.82
28th	48.93	16.99	5.16	9.31	7.36	3.93	—N/a	8.25
29th	44.31	11.51	8.03	8.97	11.95	6.51	—N/a	8.64
30th	48.50	10.10	8.58	13.99	9.59	—N/a	—N/a	9.17
31st	53.10	8.97	7.48	13.08	13.17	4.17	—N/a	—N/a
32nd	49.50	9.64	9.28	11.05	14.40	6.08	—N/a	—N/a
33rd	48.02	16.98	5.53	11.78	14.06	3.51	—N/a	—N/a
34th	52.03	9.43	8.33	10.66	13.25	6.22	—N/a	—N/a
35th	44.97	15.53	11.76	7.78	14.77	5.09	—N/a	—N/a
36th	50.50	11.97	6.88	12.97	9.37	—N/a	—N/a	7.70
37th	49.69	4.14	6.82	10.06	11.17	6.26	—N/a	11.79
38th	—N/a	22.19	9.84	42.78	25.18	—N/a	—N/a	—N/a
39th	47.02	—N/a	11.25	10.26	16.11	9.42	—N/a	5.89
40th	50.62	14.30	5.63	12.97	16.42	—N/a	—N/a	—N/a
41st	52.89	12.69	10.55	12.66	11.16	—N/a	—N/a	—N/a
42nd	53.43	15.74	5.45	11.43	13.89	—N/a	—N/a	—N/a
43rd	54.09	15.43	6.96	6.04	8.91	—N/a	—N/a	8.46
44th	25.72	14.28	15.67	8.33	30.88	—N/a	—N/a	5.05
45th	40.56	12.86	10.11	14.89	15.20	5.89	—N/a	—N/a

Aleksey Shaposhnikov (United Russia) was re-elected as Chairman of the City Duma, while incumbent Senator and Deputy Chairwoman of the Federation Council Inna Svyatenko (United Russia) was re-appointed to the Federation Council.

== District breakdown ==
=== District 1 ===
The 1st district covers all of Zelenograd. Incumbent deputy Andrey Titov (United Russia) won re-election a second term in office.

==== Candidates ====
===== Registered =====
- Dmitry Baranov (LDPR), acting LDPR local office coordinator
- Olga Sorokina (New People), entrepreneur
- Andrey Titov (United Russia), incumbent Member of Moscow City Duma (2019–present), businessman
- Ivan Ulyanchenko (CPRF), former Head of Andreyevka (2018–2019), 2019 runner-up for this seat
- Sergey Ulyanov (Communists of Russia), self-employed
- Olga Vasilyeva (SR–ZP), community activist, accountant

===== Withdrew =====
- Aleksandr Gunko (Yabloko), businessman, perennial candidate
- Yevgeny Luzikov (Independent), businessman

==== Results ====
Summary of the 6–8 September 2024 Moscow City Duma election in District 1
Candidate	Party	Votes	%
Andrey Titov (incumbent)	United Russia	39,271	49.96%
Olga Sorokina	New People	12,389	15.76%
Ivan Ulyanchenko	Communist Party	8,613	10.96%
Olga Vasilyeva	A Just Russia – For Truth	7,223	9.19%
Dmitry Baranov	Liberal Democratic Party	6,896	8.77%
Sergey Ulyanov	Communists of Russia	4,192	5.33%
Total		78,606	100%

=== District 2 ===
The 2nd district covers outer parts of North-Western and Northern Moscow, including Kurkino, Molzhaninovsky, parts of Mitino and Severnoye Tushino. Incumbent deputy Dmitry Loktev (Independent) declined to seek a second term in office and was succeeded by Olympic biathlete Olga Zaitseva (United Russia).

==== Candidates ====
===== Registered =====
- Vitaly Fedotov (LDPR), Former Member of Kurkino District Council of Deputies (2017–2024), community activist, 2019 Independent candidate for this seat
- Yevgeny Lagunov (Communists of Russia), attorney
- Konstantin Loginov (CPRF), private security company owner
- Kirill Lukonin (The Greens), medical representative
- Ivan Melnikov (SR–ZP), nonprofit executive, attorney, 2019 Party of Growth candidate in the 4th district
- Stanislav Murashev (New People), IT executive, United Russia primary candidate
- Olga Zaitseva (United Russia), 2006 and 2010 Olympic Champion biathlete

===== Failed to qualify =====
- Olesya Pererva (Independent), Member of Molzhaninovsky District Council of Deputies (2022–present), Khimki municipal official

===== Withdrew =====
- Svetlana Krivitskaya (Yabloko), party official
- Maksim Parfiryev (Independent), hunting rights activist

===== Declined =====
- Gleb Khodin (SR–ZP), individual entrepreneur
- Dmitry Loktev (Independent), incumbent Member of Moscow City Duma (2019–present), historical reenactment club leader

==== Results ====
Summary of the 6–8 September 2024 Moscow City Duma election in District 2
Candidate	Party	Votes	%
Olga Zaitseva	United Russia	33,974	53.33%
Stanislav Murashev	New People	7,848	12.32%
Vitaly Fedotov	Liberal Democratic Party	6,152	9.66%
Konstantin Loginov	Communist Party	5,171	8.12%
Ivan Melnikov	A Just Russia – For Truth	4,311	6.77%
Kirill Lukonin	The Greens	3,181	4.99%
Yevgeny Lagunov	Communists of Russia	3,044	4.78%
Total		63,710	100%

=== District 3 ===
The 3rd district covers parts of North-Western Moscow, including Yuzhnoye Tushino, parts of Mitino, Pokrovskoye-Streshnevo and Severnoye Tushino. Incumbent deputy Aleksandr Solovyov (SR–ZP) declined to seek a second term in office and was succeeded by cosmonaut Anton Shkaplerov (United Russia).

==== Candidates ====
===== Registered =====
- Dmitry Frolov (Communists of Russia), youth centre storekeeper
- Gennady Goncharov (Independent), mechanic
- Andrey Gulko (SR–ZP), Member of Severnoye Tushino District Council of Deputies (2022–present), graduate student
- Dmitry Lesnyak (LDPR), nonprofit executive, 2019 Independent candidate in the 43rd district
- Anton Shkaplerov (United Russia), cosmonaut
- Vladislav Sultanov (New People), Member of Danilovsky District Council of Deputies (2022–present), individual entrepreneur
- Anatoly Udaltsov (Independent), homemaker
- Roman Ustyuzhanin (CPRF), TV host, polygraph examiner

===== Failed to qualify =====
- Konstantin Sukhanov (The Greens), self-employed

===== Declined =====
- Aleksandr Solovyov (SR–ZP), incumbent Member of Moscow City Duma (2019–present)

==== Results ====
Summary of the 6–8 September 2024 Moscow City Duma election in District 3
Candidate	Party	Votes	%
Anton Shkaplerov	United Russia	35,632	51.95%
Gennady Goncharov	Independent	8,502	12.40%
Dmitry Lesnyak	Liberal Democratic Party	6,360	9.27%
Vladislav Sultanov	New People	4,898	7.14%
Andrey Gulko	A Just Russia – For Truth	4,139	6.03%
Roman Ustyuzhanin	Communist Party	4,113	6.00%
Dmitry Frolov	Communists of Russia	3,353	4.89%
Anatoly Udaltsov	Independent	1,557	2.27%
Total		68,586	100%

=== District 4 ===
The 4th district covers parts of North-Western and Northern Moscow, including Shchukino, Strogino, parts of Kuntsevo and Pokrovskoye-Streshnevo. Incumbent deputy Mariya Kiselyova (My Moscow) won re-election a second term in office as a United Russia candidate.

==== Candidates ====
===== Registered =====
- Arkady Agranat (The Greens), institute director
- Yevgeny Budnik (SR–ZP), former Member of Basmanny District Council of Deputies (2012–2017), individual entrepreneur
- Alexey Gavrilov (New People), actor
- Andrey Grebennik (CPRF), Member of Shchukino District Council of Deputies (1997–present), former Head of Shchukino District (2016–2021)
- Mariya Kiselyova (United Russia), incumbent Member of Moscow City Duma (2019–present), TV host, sports school director
- Andrey Kabushev (Independent), driver
- Valentin Orionov (LDPR), aide to State Duma member Ivan Musatov, perennial candidate
- Mikhail Parfyonov (Independent), nonprofit executive
- Aleksandr Vasilyev (Communists of Russia), publishing executive, Russian Communist Youth League activist

===== Withdrew =====
- Irina Kopkina (Yabloko), former Member of Strogino District Council of Deputies (2017–2022), 2014 runner-up for this seat, 2019 candidate for this seat
- Maria Shilova (Independent), unemployed

===== Declined =====
- Inna Gorislavtseva (SR–ZP), community activist

==== Results ====
Summary of the 6–8 September 2024 Moscow City Duma election in District 4
Candidate	Party	Votes	%
Mariya Kiselyova (incumbent)	United Russia	37,244	53.76%
Andrey Grebennik	Communist Party	8,864	12.80%
Alexey Gavrilov	New People	5,146	7.43%
Valentin Orionov	Liberal Democratic Party	4,527	6.54%
Arkady Agranat	The Greens	3,122	4.51%
Aleksandr Vasilyev	Communists of Russia	3,010	4.35%
Yevgeny Budnik	A Just Russia – For Truth	2,751	3.97%
Mikhail Parfyonov	Independent	2,486	3.59%
Andrey Kabushev	Independent	2,046	2.95%
Total		69,272	100%

=== District 5 ===
The 5th district covers outer parts of Northern Moscow, including Golovinsky, Khovrino, Levoberezhny and part of Zapadnoye Degunino. Incumbent deputy Yevgeny Bunimovich (Yabloko) declined to seek a fifth non-consecutive term in office and was succeeded by Russian Army Theatre director Milena Avimskaya (United Russia).

==== Candidates ====
===== Registered =====
- Mikhail Androsov (SR–ZP), aide to State Duma member
- Milena Avimskaya (United Russia), director of the Russian Army Theatre (2024–present)
- Aleksandra Bespalova (CPRF), sports instructor
- Dmitry Golubyatnikov (LDPR), engineer, United Russia primary candidate
- Pavel Korytnikov (New People), former Rosleskhoz and Rospotrebnadzor advisor
- Ivan Kurbakov (Communists of Russia), fatherhood activist

===== Withdrew =====
- Andrey Baranyuk (Independent), programmer
- Ilya Chipiga (Yabloko), individual entrepreneur
- Svetlana Schmidt (Independent), cashier
- Mikhail Volkov (The Greens), unemployed

===== Declined =====
- Yevgeny Bunimovich (Yabloko), incumbent Member of Moscow City Duma for the 6th district (1997–2009, 2019–present)
- Natalya Masyagina (United Russia), rector of Moscow State University of Sport and Tourism Industry (2020–present), 2009 Patriots of Russia candidate
- Sergey Zaytsev (SR–ZP), conservative activist

==== Results ====
Summary of the 6–8 September 2024 Moscow City Duma election in District 5
Candidate	Party	Votes	%
Milena Avimskaya	United Russia	31,936	44.19%
Aleksandra Bespalova	Communist Party	12,584	17.41%
Pavel Korytnikov	New People	8,923	12.35%
Dmitry Golubyatnikov	Liberal Democratic Party	8,496	11.76%
Mikhail Androsov	A Just Russia – For Truth	5,569	7.71%
Ivan Kurbakov	Communists of Russia	4,729	6.54%
Total		72,264	100%

=== District 6 ===
The 6th district covers outer parts of Northern Moscow, including Dmitrovsky, Vostochnoye Degunino, parts of Beskudnikovsky and Zapadnoye Degunino. Incumbent deputy Nadezhda Perfilova (United Russia) won re-election to a third term in office.

==== Candidates ====
===== Registered =====
- Nikolay Ageyev (Independent), individual entrepreneur
- Viktoria Aleynikova (SR–ZP), Member of Zapadnoye Degunino District Council of Deputies (2022–present), tutor
- Marsel Dyuran (LDPR), lawyer
- Maksim Konkin (CPRF), aide to Senator Ayrat Gibatdinov, private security company owner
- Valery Limet (New People), self-employed
- Nadezhda Perfilova (United Russia), incumbent Member of Moscow City Duma for the 7th district (2014–present), school principal

===== Withdrew after registration =====
- Nikolay Knyazev (Communists of Russia), recycling executive

===== Withdrew =====
- Maksim Chakhovsky (Independent), former Rosatom executive
- Anna Frolova (Yabloko), party official
- Andrey Litvinov (New People), retired commercial pilot (withdrawn by the party on July 4, 2024)

===== Eliminated in the primary =====
- Oleg Morozov (United Russia), Head of Vostochnoye Degunino District (2022–present)

===== Declined =====
- Pyotr Zvyagintsev (CPRF), Member of Vostochnoye Degunino District Council of Deputies (2008–2017, 2022–present), 2014 and 2019 runner-up in the 7th district

==== Results ====
Summary of the 6–8 September 2024 Moscow City Duma election in District 6
Candidate	Party	Votes	%
Nadezhda Perfilova (incumbent)	United Russia	43,166	54.09%
Viktoria Aleynikova	A Just Russia – For Truth	11,862	14.86%
Maksim Konkin	Communist Party	9,523	11.93%
Valery Limet	New People	7,122	8.92%
Marsel Dyuran	Liberal Democratic Party	4,222	5.29%
Nikolay Ageyev	Independent	3,896	4.88%
Total		79,807	100%

=== District 7 ===
The 7th district covers parts of Northern Moscow, including Aeroport, Koptevo, Sokol, Voykovsky and part of Khoroshyovsky. Incumbent deputy Darya Besedina (Yabloko) declined to seek a second term in office and was later barred from seeking re-election due to her foreign agent status, she was succeeded by patriotic education centre director Darya Borisova (United Russia).

==== Candidates ====
===== Registered =====
- Darya Borisova (United Russia), patriotic education centre director
- Anatoly Farafonov (New People), individual entrepreneur
- Dmitry Matyushenkov (LDPR), lawyer
- Andrey Pangayev (The Greens), pharmaceutical businessman
- Anastasia Rotkova (CPRF), lawyer, community activist
- Igor Stepanov (Independent), attorney
- Mikhail Timkov (SR–ZP), self-employed

===== Withdrew =====
- Arslan Khasavov (New People), journalist, writer (withdrawn by the party on July 4, 2024)
- Vitaly Radchenko (Yabloko), unemployed
- Maksim Savan (Independent), manager

===== Disqualified =====
- Marina Litvinovich (Yabloko), political strategist, human rights activist (listed as foreign agent on May 31, 2024)

===== Declined =====
- Mikhail Androsov (SR–ZP), aide to State Duma member (running in the 5th district)
- Darya Besedina (Yabloko), incumbent Member of Moscow City Duma for the 8th district (2019–present), urban planner, foreign agent
- Igor Stepanov (CPRF), former Head of Sokol District (2017–2022), 2019 runner-up in the 9th district (endorsed Rotkova)

==== Results ====
Summary of the 6–8 September 2024 Moscow City Duma election in District 7
Candidate	Party	Votes	%
Darya Borisova	United Russia	30,378	46.67%
Anastasia Rotkova	Communist Party	8,441	12.97%
Andrey Pangayev	The Greens	7,272	11.17%
Anatoly Farafonov	New People	6,259	9.62%
Dmitry Matyushenkov	Liberal Democratic Party	5,214	8.01%
Mikhail Timkov	A Just Russia – For Truth	4,051	6.22%
Igor Stepanov	Independent	3,448	5.30%
Total		65,095	100%

=== District 8 ===
The 8th district covers inner parts of Northern Moscow, including Begovoy, Savyolovsky, Timiryazevsky, parts of Beskudnikovsky and Khoroshyovsky. Incumbent deputy and Duma Deputy Chairman Andrey Medvedev (Independent) was re-elected to a second term in office as a United Russia candidate.

==== Candidates ====
===== Registered =====
- Ivan Arkhipov (New People), self-employed
- Dmitry Bitkov (Communists of Russia), warehouse employee
- Andrey Medvedev (United Russia), Deputy Chairman of the Moscow City Duma (2021–present), incumbent Member of the Duma for the 9th district (2019–present), journalist
- Anastasia Pavlyuchenkova (SR–ZP), advisor to State Duma member Sergey Mironov, leader of the party youth organisation
- Aleksandr Shprygin (LDPR), waste management executive, football fan activist
- Matvey Zotov (CPRF), undergraduate student

===== Withdrew =====
- Angelina Kuzub (Independent), trainee attorney
- Nadezhda Pavlova (Independent), unemployed
- Andrey Sado (The Greens), content manager
- Olga Solntseva (Yabloko), individual entrepreneur

===== Declined =====
- Aleksandr Yefimovich (Independent), lawyer, community activist

==== Results ====
Summary of the 6–8 September 2024 Moscow City Duma election in District 8
Candidate	Party	Votes	%
Andrey Medvedev (incumbent)	United Russia	37,599	55.38%
Anastasia Pavlyuchenkova	A Just Russia – For Truth	8,795	12.95%
Igor Arkhipov	New People	7,800	11.49%
Aleksandr Shprygin	Liberal Democratic Party	5,814	8.56%
Matvey Zotov	Communist Party	5,287	7.79%
Dmitry Bitkov	Communists of Russia	2,556	3.76%
Total		67,895	100%

=== District 9 ===
The 9th district covers outer parts of North-Eastern Moscow, including Bibirevo, Lianozovo and Severny. Incumbent deputy Larisa Kartavtseva (United Russia) won re-election to a third term in office.

==== Candidates ====
===== Registered =====
- Nikolay Durnev (Independent), individual entrepreneur
- Andrey Dutov (CPRF), electrician
- Ivan Ivchenko (LDPR), businessman
- Larisa Kartavtseva (United Russia), incumbent Member of Moscow City Duma for the 10th district (2014–present)
- Igor Laskeyev (New People), individual entrepreneur
- Dmitry Porokhov (SR–ZP), manager
- Andrey Topal (Independent), businessman

===== Withdrew =====
- Nikolay Toropov (Independent), unemployed

==== Results ====
Summary of the 6–8 September 2024 Moscow City Duma election in District 9
Candidate	Party	Votes	%
Larisa Kartavtseva (incumbent)	United Russia	40,768	50.03%
Ivan Ivchenko	Liberal Democratic Party	11,065	13.58%
Andrey Dutov	Communist Party	8,765	10.76%
Andrey Topal	Independent	6,794	8.34%
Dmitry Porokhov	A Just Russia – For Truth	5,955	7.31%
Igor Laskeyev	New People	5,290	6.49%
Nikolay Durnev	Independent	2,794	3.43%
Total		81,487	100%

=== District 10 ===
The 10th district covers parts of North-Eastern Moscow, including Altufyevsky, Marfino and Otradnoye. Incumbent deputy and CPRF faction leader Nikolay Zubrilin won re-election to a third term in office.

==== Candidates ====
===== Registered =====
- Gordey Armensky (SR–ZP), individual entrepreneur
- Zinaida Avdoshkina (United Russia), Head of Marfino District (2012–present)
- Ildar Kharipov (New People), individual entrepreneur
- Aleksandra Vekshina (LDPR), Member of Otradnoye District Council of Deputies (2022–present), engineer
- Nikolay Zubrilin (CPRF), incumbent Member of Moscow City Duma for the 11th district (2014–present), chairman of CPRF faction (2019–present)

===== Failed to qualify =====
- Aleksandra Tishchenko (Independent), businesswoman, 2023 mayoral candidate

===== Withdrew =====
- Valery Novikov (Yabloko), journalist
- Vladimir Zhilkin (Independent), Golos activist, former foreign agent

===== Eliminated in the primary =====
- Elmira Kashirina (United Russia), former Deputy Head of the City Department of Health (2022)

==== Results ====
Summary of the 6–8 September 2024 Moscow City Duma election in District 10
Candidate	Party	Votes	%
Nikolay Zubrilin (incumbent)	Communist Party	25,439	33.67%
Zinaida Avdoshkina	United Russia	20,533	27.18%
Aleksandra Vekshina	Liberal Democratic Party	15,228	20.15%
Ildar Kharipov	New People	8,002	10.59%
Gordey Armensky	A Just Russia – For Truth	6,330	8.38%
Total		75,558	100%

=== District 11 ===
The 11th district covers outer parts of North-Eastern Moscow, including Severnoye Medvedkovo, Sviblovo and Yuzhnoye Medvedkovo. Incumbent deputy and Duma Chairman Aleksey Shaposhnikov (United Russia) was re-elected to a third term in office.

==== Candidates ====
===== Registered =====
- Aleksandr Boldin (Communists of Russia), vehicle depot foreman
- Dmitry Bolotnikov (CPRF), security manager
- Arseny Chzhan (New People), nonprofit executive
- Timur Galeyev (SR–ZP), MSU junior researcher
- Andrey Khrenov (Independent), engineer
- Aleksey Shaposhnikov (United Russia), Chairman of the Moscow City Duma for the 12th district (2014–present)
- Yevgeny Stepkin (LDPR), Member of Severnoye Medvedkovo District Council of Deputies (2022–present), engineer, 2019 candidate in the 14th district

==== Results ====
Summary of the 6–8 September 2024 Moscow City Duma election in District 11
Candidate	Party	Votes	%
Aleksey Shaposhnikov (incumbent)	United Russia	40,192	57.20%
Yevgeny Stepkin	Liberal Democratic Party	7,145	10.17%
Dmitry Bolotnikov	Communist Party	5,831	8.30%
Aleksandr Boldin	Communists of Russia	5,103	7.26%
Andrey Khrenov	Independent	4,706	6.70%
Arseny Chzhan	New People	3,789	5.39%
Timur Galeyev	A Just Russia – For Truth	3,457	4.92%
Total		70,260	100%

=== District 12 ===
The 12th district covers outer parts of North-Eastern Moscow, including Babushkinsky, Losinoostrovsky and Yaroslavsky. Incumbent deputy Igor Buskin (United Russia) declined to seek a second term in office and was succeeded by former State Duma member Aleksey Lisovenko (United Russia).

==== Candidates ====
===== Registered =====
- Maksim Fitkhulin (Independent), self-employed
- Anton Korytov (CPRF), Member of Babushkinsky District Council of Deputies (2022–present), RUT assistant professor
- Aleksey Lisovenko (United Russia), former Member of State Duma (2021), former Head of Babushkinsky District (2012–2020)
- Aleksandr Polyakov (Independent), soldier
- Daniil Ponizov (New People), engineer
- Denis Romashkin (Independent), Army shooter
- Yevgeny Rybin (LDPR), unemployed, 2019 candidate in the 12th district
- Leonid Zavaritsky (Communists of Russia), youth centre deputy director

===== Withdrew after registration =====
- Yury Zagrebelny (SR–ZP), Member of Yaroslavsky District Council of Deputies (2022–present), businessman (withdrew July 27, 2024)

===== Failed to qualify =====
- Sergey Zlodeyev (Independent), student

===== Withdrew =====
- Varvara Kosheleva (Independent), self-employed, Libertarian Party of Russia activist
- Aleksandra Kuznetsova (The Greens), transportation analyst
- Natalia Zhilkina (Independent), community activist

===== Eliminated in the primary =====
- Anna Fyodorova (United Russia), Head of Losinoostrovsky District (2017–present)

===== Declined =====
- Igor Buskin (United Russia), incumbent Member of Moscow City Duma for the 13th district (2019–present), park director

==== Results ====
Summary of the 6–8 September 2024 Moscow City Duma election in District 12
Candidate	Party	Votes	%
Aleksey Lisovenko	United Russia	29,644	43.27%
Anton Korytov	Communist Party	10,114	14.76%
Daniil Ponizov	New People	7,191	10.50%
Yevgeny Rybin	Liberal Democratic Party	6,505	9.49%
Aleksandr Polyakov	Independent	5,378	7.85%
Denis Romashkin	Independent	4,338	6.33%
Leonid Zavaritsky	Communists of Russia	4,293	6.27%
Maksim Fitkhulin	Independent	1,020	1.49%
Total		68,514	100%

=== District 13 ===
The 13th district covers inner parts of North-Eastern Moscow, including Alekseyevsky, Butyrsky, Maryina Roshcha, Ostankinsky and Rostokino. Incumbent first-term deputy and Yabloko faction leader Maksim Kruglov failed to qualify by collecting signatures and was succeeded by Severnoye Medvedkovo District head Aleksandr Sapronov (United Russia).

==== Candidates ====
===== Registered =====
- Aleksandr Babak (Independent), unemployed
- Aleksey Balin (New People), individual entrepreneur
- Ita Cherkesova (CPRF), Member of Butyrsky District Council of Deputies (2022–present)
- Yulia Kharchenko (Independent), self-employed
- Mikhail Kislitsky (SR–ZP), Institute of Economics senior researcher
- Yevgeny Obrezkov (LDPR), sales manager, 2009 candidate
- Aleksandr Sapronov (United Russia), Head of Severnoye Medvedkovo District (2022–present), park director
- Ruslan Sharypin (Independent), technical supervisor

===== Failed to qualify =====
- Maksim Kruglov (Yabloko), incumbent Member of Moscow City Duma for the 14th district (2019–present), chairman of Yabloko faction (2019–present)
- Yelena Strelnikova (Independent), individual entrepreneur, community activist

===== Withdrew =====
- Andrey Fomin (The Greens), ecological activist

===== Eliminated in the primary =====
- Yekaterina Ignatova (United Russia), Head of Maryina Roshcha District (2016–present), 2019 Independent candidate in the 14th district
- Igor Strakhov (United Russia), Head of Administration of Alekseyevsky District (2023–present)

===== Declined =====
- Artyom Chernov (New People), businessman
- Natalya Zabelina (United Russia), director of Central City Business Library, former Member of Alekseyevsky District Council of Deputies (2004–2017)

==== Results ====
Summary of the 6–8 September 2024 Moscow City Duma election in District 13
Candidate	Party	Votes	%
Aleksandr Sapronov	United Russia	31,925	47.64%
Ita Cherkesova	Communist Party	8,201	12.24%
Yevgeny Obrezkov	Liberal Democratic Party	6,587	9.83%
Aleksey Balin	New People	6,457	9.64%
Mikhail Kislitsky	A Just Russia – For Truth	5,232	7.81%
Yulia Kharchenko	Independent	4,415	6.59%
Ruslan Sharypin	Independent	2,270	3.39%
Aleksandr Babak	Independent	1,873	2.80%
Total		67,010	100%

=== District 14 ===
The 14th district covers parts of Eastern Moscow, including Bogorodskoye, Metrogorodok, Sokolniki and part of Golyanovo. Incumbent deputy Mikhail Timonov (SR–ZP) was barred from seeking reelection due to his foreign agent status and was succeeded by community activist Sabina Tsvetkova (United Russia).

==== Candidates ====
===== Registered =====
- Aleksandr Kotov (LDPR), former chief of staff to the State Duma Committee on Physical Culture, Sports, Tourism, and Youth (2020–2021)
- Irina Krokhmal (SR–ZP), blogger, psychologist
- Konstantin Presnyakov (The Greens), businessman
- Sergey Smirnov (Independent), engineer
- Aleksey Sokolov (CPRF), information security specialist
- Nikita Surovezhko (New People), Member of Timiryazevsky District Council of Deputies (2022–present), businessman
- Sabina Tsvetkova (United Russia), community activist, 2019 Independent runner-up in the 3rd district

===== Failed to qualify =====
- Vladimir Khvatov (Independent), homemaker

===== Withdrew =====
- Denis Mitryayev (Independent), unemployed
- Anna Shatunovskaya-Byurno (Yabloko), former diplomat and lawyer
- Anastasia Yurkina (Independent), homemaker

===== Declined =====
- Mikhail Kozin (New People), businessman (withdrawn by the party on July 4, 2024)
- Kirill Mandrygin (United Russia), lawyer (withdrew from the primary)
- Georgy Volkov (SR–ZP), Member of Bogorodskoye District Council of Deputies (2022–present), aide to Moscow City Duma member Mikhail Timonov

==== Results ====
Summary of the 6–8 September 2024 Moscow City Duma election in District 14
Candidate	Party	Votes	%
Sabina Tsvetkova	United Russia	29,508	44.32%
Aleksandr Kotov	Liberal Democratic Party	11,983	18.00%
Aleksey Sokolov	Communist Party	7,731	11.61%
Nikita Surovezhko	New People	5,477	8.23%
Irina Krokhmal	A Just Russia – For Truth	4,010	6.02%
Sergey Smirnov	Independent	3,889	5.84%
Konstantin Presnyakov	The Greens	3,710	5.57%
Total		66,574	100%

=== District 15 ===
The 15th district covers parts of Eastern Moscow, including Preobrazhenskoye, Severnoye Izmaylovo and parts of Golyanovo. Incumbent deputy Sergey Savostyanov (CPRF) was deselected at the party convention and was succeeded by Moscow Railway deputy chief Pyotr Potapov (Independent).

==== Candidates ====
===== Registered =====
- Vladimir Anshakov (Independent), individual entrepreneur
- Aleksandr Dyagilev (SR–ZP), Member of Council of Deputies of Dolgoprudny (2019–present), perennial candidate, 2009 Independent candidate in the 11th district
- Nikolay Kolosov (New People), marketing executive, Society.Future activist
- Pyotr Potapov (Independent), Deputy Chief of the Moscow Railway (2020–present), withdrawn United Russia primary candidate
- Denis Rudykh (CPRF), painter, aide to Moscow City Duma member Yelena Yanchuk
- Nikolay Timonin (Communists of Russia), tunnelling electrician

===== Failed to qualify =====
- Olga Zabaturina (The Greens), self-employed

===== Withdrew =====
- Viktor Kogan-Yasny (Yabloko), advisor to Yabloko leader Grigory Yavlinsky, human rights activist
- Lyubov Popova (Independent), pensioner

===== Declined =====
- Nikolay Gubanov (United Russia), machine operator (won United Russia primary, did not file)
- Yegor Koskov (LDPR), community activist
- Sergey Savostyanov (CPRF), incumbent Member of Moscow City Duma (2019–present), lawyer

==== Results ====
Summary of the 6–8 September 2024 Moscow City Duma election in District 15
Candidate	Party	Votes	%
Pyotr Potapov	Independent	23,322	33.95%
Nikolay Kolosov	New People	12,595	18.33%
Aleksandr Dyagilev	A Just Russia – For Truth	9,991	14.54%
Nikolay Timonin	Communists of Russia	9,628	14.01%
Denis Rudykh	Communist Party	7,831	11.40%
Vladimir Anshakov	Independent	5,274	7.68%
Total		78,606	100%

=== District 16 ===
The 16th district covers parts of Eastern Moscow, including Perovo, Sokolinaya Gora and parts of Novogireyevo. Incumbent deputy Viktor Maksimov (CPRF) was deselected at the party convention and ran for a second term as an independent but lost to former Legislative Assembly of Kemerovo Oblast member Yelena Yamshchikova (SR–ZP).

==== Candidates ====
===== Registered =====
- Vladimir Davydov (The Greens), electromechanic
- Ilya Khovanets (LDPR), sales manager, 2019 candidate in the 17th district
- Viktor Maksimov (Independent), incumbent Member of Moscow City Duma for the 17th district (2019–present), MGPU history methodologist
- Mikhail Petrov (CPRF), Member of Perovo District Council of Deputies (2012–2017, 2022–present), 2014 runner-up in the 17th district
- Yelena Yamshchikova (SR–ZP), former Member of Legislative Assembly of Kemerovo Oblast (2011–2013), aide to Moscow City Duma member Aleksandr Solovyov

===== Withdrew after registration =====
- Stanislav Druzhinin (New People), president of Russian Diving Federation (2021–present) (withdrew August 9, 2024)
- Anna Gurchenkova (United Russia), Member of Perovo District Council of Deputies (2022–present), children community centre director (withdrew August 14, 2024)

===== Failed to qualify =====
- Andrey Ushakov-Fedorov (Independent), engineer

===== Withdrew =====
- Dmitry Kalashnikov (Independent), sales manager

===== Declined =====
- Irina Kupriyanova (CPRF), aide to State Duma member Sergei Obukhov
- Vera Stepanenko (United Russia), former Member of Moscow City Duma (2001–2014)

==== Results ====
Summary of the 6–8 September 2024 Moscow City Duma election in District 16
Candidate	Party	Votes	%
Yelena Yamshchikova	A Just Russia – For Truth	22,027	34.29%
Viktor Maksimov (incumbent)	Independent	14,694	22.87%
Mikhail Petrov	Communist Party	11,597	18.05%
Ilya Khovanets	Liberal Democratic Party	10,364	16.13%
Vladimir Davydov	The Greens	5,520	8.59%
Total		64,242	100%

=== District 17 ===
The 17th district covers parts of Eastern Moscow, including Ivanovskoye, Izmaylovo and Vostochnoye Izmaylovo. Incumbent deputy Yelena Yanchuk (CPRF) was deselected at the party convention and was succeeded by former Ivanovo Oblast Duma deputy chairman Vyacheslav Arbuzov (CPRF).

==== Candidates ====
===== Registered =====
- Vyacheslav Arbuzov (CPRF), former Deputy Chairman of the Ivanovo Oblast Duma (2018–2023), banker
- Dmitry Kapitoshin (SR–ZP), IT executive
- Yekaterina Rubina (New People), painter
- Marina Zaytseva (LDPR), businesswoman

===== Withdrew =====
- Pavel Gusev (Independent), individual entrepreneur
- Sergey Medvedev (Independent), homemaker, 2021 candidate in the 19th district
- Dmitry Yarutkin (Independent), engineer

===== Declined =====
- Maria Sokolova (United Russia), former Member of Golyanovo District Council of Deputies (2017–2022), city polyclinic chief doctor (won United Russia primary, did not file)
- Yelena Yanchuk (CPRF), incumbent Member of Moscow City Duma for the 18th district (2019–present)

==== Results ====
Summary of the 6–8 September 2024 Moscow City Duma election in District 17
Candidate	Party	Votes	%
Vyacheslav Arbuzov	Communist Party	22,545	31.58%
Dmitry Kapitoshin	A Just Russia – For Truth	16,510	23.13%
Marina Zaytseva	Liberal Democratic Party	16,297	22.83%
Yekaterina Rubina	New People	15,931	22.32%
Total		71,380	100%

=== District 18 ===
The 18th district covers parts of Eastern Moscow, including Novokosino, Vostochny, parts of Novogireyevo and Veshnyaki. Incumbent deputy Yelena Kats (United Russia) declined to seek a second term in office and was succeeded by former city government official Lyudmila Mitryuk (United Russia).

==== Candidates ====
===== Registered =====
- Vadim Aleksandrov (Independent), cashier, 2021 Green Alternative candidate in the 19th district
- Aleksey Antipov (CPRF), engineer
- Vladimir Badmayev (Independent), lawyer, 2019 Communists of Russia candidate in the 22nd district
- Lyudmila Mitryuk (United Russia), former Deputy Head of the Moscow Department of Labour and Social Protection (2020–2021)
- Aleksandr Molokhov (SR–ZP), attorney, 2001 Independent candidate in the 16th district, 2014 Yabloko candidate in the 20th district
- Aleksandr Moskvitin (LDPR), air conditioning executive
- Vladislav Voynakov (New People), project manager, community activist

===== Withdrew =====
- Mikhail Butrimov (Independent), former Member of Veshnyaki District Council of Deputies (2012–2017), community activist, 2018 ROS mayoral candidate, 2021 candidate in the 19th district
- Yekaterina Fedulova (Yabloko), party official
- Stanislav Shmelyov (New People), T-Bank executive (withdrawn by the party July 4, 2024)
- Oksana Yarovaya (Independent), manager

===== Declined =====
- Yelena Kats (United Russia), incumbent Member of Moscow City Duma for the 19th district (2021–present), children bronchopulmonary sanatorium chief doctor

==== Results ====
Summary of the 6–8 September 2024 Moscow City Duma election in District 18
Candidate	Party	Votes	%
Lyudmila Mitryuk	United Russia	33,577	50.24%
Aleksey Antipov	Communist Party	7,176	10.74%
Aleksandr Molokhov	A Just Russia – For Truth	6,778	10.14%
Aleksandr Moskvitin	Liberal Democratic Party	6,399	9.57%
Vladislav Voynakov	New People	5,931	8.87%
Vadim Aleksandrov	Independent	3,750	5.61%
Vladimir Badmayev	Independent	3,195	4.78%
Total		66,839	100%

=== District 19 ===
The 19th district covers outer parts of Eastern and South-Eastern Moscow, including Kosino-Ukhtomsky, Nekrasovka, parts of Veshnyaki and Vykhino-Zhulebino. Incumbent deputy Yevgeny Stupin (Independent) was expelled in May 2024 and was succeeded by school principal Maya Bulayeva (United Russia).

==== Candidates ====
===== Registered =====
- Anton Alekseyev (Independent), individual entrepreneur
- Aleksandr Andreyev (CPRF), Member of Duma of Vinzili, aide to State Duma member Viktor Sobolev
- Dmitry Bolshakov (LDPR), nonprofit executive
- Maya Bulayeva (United Russia), Member of Nekrasovka District Council of Deputies (2022–present), school principal
- Konstantin Krokhmal (SR–ZP), TV pundit, community activist
- Anton Shuvalov (The Greens), unemployed
- Aleksandr Stupin (Independent), self-employed
- Dmitry Zakharov (New People), businessman

===== Declined =====
- Yevgeny Stupin (Independent), former Member of Moscow City Duma for the 20th district (2019–2024), foreign agent

==== Results ====
Summary of the 6–8 September 2024 Moscow City Duma election in District 19
Candidate	Party	Votes	%
Maya Bulayeva	United Russia	31,037	38.99%
Dmitry Bolshakov	Liberal Democratic Party	10,582	13.29%
Dmitry Zakharov	New People	7,334	9.21%
Aleksandr Andreyev	Communist Party	6,609	8.30%
Konstantin Krokhmal	A Just Russia – For Truth	4,248	5.34%
Aleksandr Stupin	Independent	3,771	4.74%
Anton Alekseyev	Independent	3,190	4.01%
Anton Shuvalov	The Greens	2,828	3.55%
Total		79,612	100%

=== District 20 ===
The 20th district covers outer parts of South-Eastern Moscow, including Kapotnya, parts of Lyublino, Maryino and Vykhino-Zhulebino. Incumbent deputy Leonid Zyuganov (CPRF) was re-elected to a third term in office.

==== Candidates ====
===== Registered =====
- Ilia Burlyayev (SR–ZP), aide to State Duma member Nikolai Burlyayev, son of Nikolay Burlyayev
- Aleksandr Lomachenko (United Russia), road safety engineer, former Chamber of Commerce and Industry of the Russian Federation executive
- Konstantin Mineyev (New People), individual entrepreneur
- Gennady Roshchupkin (LDPR), heating engineer
- Leonid Zyuganov (CPRF), incumbent Member of Moscow City Duma for the 21st district (2014–present), 2023 mayoral candidate

===== Withdrew =====
- Aleksey Krylovsky (Independent), physician

==== Results ====
Summary of the 6–8 September 2024 Moscow City Duma election in District 20
Candidate	Party	Votes	%
Leonid Zyuganov (incumbent)	Communist Party	21,353	33.07%
Aleksandr Lomachenko	United Russia	17,193	26.63%
Gennady Roshchupkin	Liberal Democratic Party	9,817	15.21%
Konstantin Mineyev	New People	9,366	14.51%
Ilia Burlyayev	A Just Russia – For Truth	6,788	10.51%
Total		64,562	100%

=== District 21 ===
The 21st district covers most of Maryino in South-Eastern Moscow. Incumbent deputy and Senator Inna Svyatenko (United Russia) was re-elected to a sixth term in office.

==== Candidates ====
===== Registered =====
- Dmitry Bondar (New People), IT executive
- Giorgi Margaryan (Independent), graduate student
- Yury Nabiyev (SR–ZP), attorney
- Aleksandr Pankov (LDPR), self-employed
- Inna Svyatenko (United Russia), Senator from Moscow (2019–present), incumbent Member of Moscow City Duma for the 22nd district (2001–present)

===== Withdrew after registration =====
- Dmitry Sarayev (CPRF), self-employed, 2014 candidate in the 3rd district, 2019 runner-up in the 22nd district (disqualified on July 16, 2024, due to administrative conviction)

===== Withdrew =====
- Sergey Smirnov (Independent), engineer, 2019 candidate in the 25th district

===== Eliminated in the primary =====
- Viktor Sotskov (United Russia), Head of Maryino District (2017–present)

==== Results ====
Summary of the 6–8 September 2024 Moscow City Duma election in District 21
Candidate	Party	Votes	%
Inna Svyatenko (incumbent)	United Russia	40,036	59.15%
Dmitry Bondar	New People	10,436	15.42%
Aleksandr Pankov	Liberal Democratic Party	8,336	12.32%
Yury Nabiyev	A Just Russia – For Truth	6,800	10.05%
Giorgi Margaryan	Independent	2,070	3.06%
Total		67,685	100%

=== District 22 ===
The 22nd district covers parts of South-Eastern Moscow, including Kuzminki and part of Lyublino. Incumbent deputy and My Moscow faction leader Yelena Nikolayeva declined to seek a second term in office and was succeeded by United Russia official Maksim Rudnev.

==== Candidates ====
===== Registered =====
- Darya Averkina (New People), Member of Lefortovo District Council of Deputies (2022–present)
- Yelena Gulicheva (CPRF), former Member of Maryino District Council of Deputies (2012–2017), 2019 runner-up in the 23rd district
- Yelena Gulina (Independent), unemployed
- Vladimir Obozny (SR–ZP), Member of Kuzminki District Council of Deputies (2022–present), community activist, 2014 Great Fatherland Party candidate in the 23rd district
- Maksim Rudnev (United Russia), chairman of United Russia city office executive committee, former head of the United Russia Central Executive Committee (2012–2014)
- Yegor Velichko (LDPR), engineer

===== Withdrew =====
- Larisa Kosyuk (The Greens), forensic expert
- Sergey Yegorov (Independent), unemployed

===== Declined =====
- Yelena Nikolayeva (United Russia), incumbent Member of Moscow City Duma for the 23rd district (2019–present), chairwoman of My Moscow faction (2019–present)

==== Results ====
Summary of the 6–8 September 2024 Moscow City Duma election in District 22
Candidate	Party	Votes	%
Maksim Rudnev	United Russia	32,155	49.48%
Yelena Gulicheva	Communist Party	9,024	13.89%
Vladimir Obozny	A Just Russia – For Truth	7,231	11.13%
Darya Averkina	New People	6,577	10.12%
Yegor Velichko	Liberal Democratic Party	5,686	8.75%
Yelena Gulina	Independent	4,289	6.60%
Total		64,984	100%

=== District 23 ===
The 23rd district covers inner parts of South-Eastern Moscow, including Lefortovo, Nizhegorodsky and Ryazansky. Incumbent first-term deputy Pavel Tarasov (CPRF) was disqualified after registration due to his 2023 administrative conviction and was succeeded by retired Guards Colonel Arkady Korolkov (United Russia).

==== Candidates ====
===== Registered =====
- Aleksandra Andreyeva (Independent), homemaker, 2019 candidate in the 16th district
- Vyacheslav Dushenko (SR–ZP), Member of Lefortovo District Council of Deputies (2022–present), retired head of city antiterrorist militsiya division, 2014 candidate in the 14th district
- Arkady Korolkov (United Russia), retired Guards Colonel, Second Chechen War veteran
- Samson Sholademi (LDPR), Member of Lefortovo District Council of Deputies (2022–present), journalist
- Viktoria Skrylnikova (New People), IT businesswoman

===== Withdrew after registration =====
- Pavel Tarasov (CPRF), incumbent Member of Moscow City Duma (2019–present) (disqualified on July 26, 2024, due to administrative conviction)

===== Withdrew =====
- Maksim Dudinov (Yabloko), individual entrepreneur
- Dmitry Tsepelev (Independent), individual entrepreneur

===== Eliminated in the primary =====
- Mikhail Surkov (United Russia), Head of Lefortovo District (2017–present)

==== Results ====
Summary of the 6–8 September 2024 Moscow City Duma election in District 23
Candidate	Party	Votes	%
Arkady Korolkov	United Russia	35,567	55.52%
Aleksandra Andreyeva	Independent	8,529	13.31%
Viktoria Skrylnikova	New People	8,109	12.66%
Vyacheslav Dushenko	A Just Russia – For Truth	6,662	10.40%
Samson Sholademi	Liberal Democratic Party	5,151	8.04%
Total		64,056	100%

=== District 24 ===
The 24th district covers parts of South-Eastern Moscow, including Pechatniki, Tekstilshchiki and Yuzhnoportovy. Incumbent deputy Lyudmila Stebenkova (United Russia) was re-elected to an eighth term in office.

==== Candidates ====
===== Registered =====
- Sergey Bagyan (LDPR), intellectual property expert
- Konstantin Butyrev (SR–ZP), individual entrepreneur
- Eduard Lyutikov (CPRF), Member of Grishkovskoye Village Council, Kalininsky District (2019–present), cooperative chairman
- Anton Malyshev (New People), Member of Pechatniki District Council of Deputies (2022–present), IT executive
- Viktoria Mentyukova (Communists of Russia), Shatura municipal official
- Lyudmila Stebenkova (United Russia), incumbent Member of Moscow City Duma for the 25th district (1993–present)
- Aleksandr Vlasov (The Greens), unemployed

===== Withdrew =====
- Yekaterina Dobrynina (Independent), self-employed

==== Results ====
Summary of the 6–8 September 2024 Moscow City Duma election in District 24
Candidate	Party	Votes	%
Lyudmila Stebenkova (incumbent)	United Russia	31,735	50.06%
Anton Malyshev	New People	10,697	16.87%
Sergey Bagyan	Liberal Democratic Party	5,462	8.62%
Eduard Lyutikov	Communist Party	5,042	7.95%
Konstantin Butyrev	A Just Russia – For Truth	3,791	5.98%
Viktoria Mentyukova	Communists of Russia	3,358	5.30%
Aleksandr Vlasov	The Greens	3,298	5.20%
Total		63,400	100%

=== District 25 ===
The 25th district covers outer parts of Southern Moscow, including Brateyevo, Zyablikovo and part of Moskvorechye-Saburovo. Incumbent deputy Kirill Shchitov (United Russia) declined to seek a fourth term in office and was succeeded by City Housing Inspection deputy head Yevgeny Selivyorstov (United Russia).

==== Candidates ====
===== Registered =====
- Anastasia Afanasyeva (Communists of Russia), individual entrepreneur
- Valeria Khlynova (New People), nonprofit executive
- Yevgeny Selivyorstov (United Russia), Deputy Head of the City Housing Inspection (2019–present), son of State Duma member Viktor Seliverstov
- Larisa Senina (Independent), pensioner
- Nikolay Sergeyev (CPRF), retired police officer, 2019 runner-up in the 29th district
- Yelena Skorokhodova (SR–ZP), actress

===== Withdrew =====
- Mikhail Goryanoy (LDPR), individual entrepreneur

===== Declined =====
- Kirill Shchitov (United Russia), incumbent Member of Moscow City Duma for the 26th district (2009–present)

==== Results ====
Summary of the 6–8 September 2024 Moscow City Duma election in District 25
Candidate	Party	Votes	%
Yevgeny Selivyorstov	United Russia	35,297	51.85%
Nikolay Sergeyev	Communist Party	8,298	12.19%
Valeria Khlynova	New People	7,677	11.28%
Anastasia Afanasyeva	Communists of Russia	6,578	9.66%
Larisa Senina	Independent	5,226	7.68%
Yelena Skorokhodova	A Just Russia – For Truth	4,977	7.31%
Total		68,075	100%

=== District 26 ===
The 26th district covers outer parts of Southern Moscow, including Orekhovo-Borisovo Severnoye and Orekhovo-Borisovo Yuzhnoye. Incumbent deputy, Duma Deputy Chairman and United Russia faction leader Stepan Orlov was re-elected to a seventh term in office.

==== Candidates ====
===== Registered =====
- Pavel Kashirin (New People), auditor
- Ilnur Markelov (LDPR), Member of Dokuchaievsk City Council (2023–present), veteran of the Russian invasion of Ukraine
- Stepan Orlov (United Russia), Deputy Chairman of the Moscow City Duma (2019–present), incumbent Member of the Duma for the 27th district (1997–present), chairman of United Russia faction (2017–present)
- Konstantin Panchenko (Independent), unemployed
- Dmitry Pavlov (CPRF), self-employed
- Pavel Voytovich (SR–ZP), postgraduate student

===== Withdrew after registration =====
- Aleksandr Pavlinov (Communists of Russia), pensioner

===== Withdrew =====
- Darya Markina (Yabloko), individual entrepreneur

==== Results ====
Summary of the 6–8 September 2024 Moscow City Duma election in District 26
Candidate	Party	Votes	%
Stepan Orlov (incumbent)	United Russia	40,594	58.99%
Dmitry Pavlov	Communist Party	8,204	11.92%
Pavel Kashirin	New People	5,885	8.55%
Ilnur Markelov	Liberal Democratic Party	5,545	8.06%
Pavel Voytovich	A Just Russia – For Truth	4,455	6.47%
Konstantin Panchenko	Independent	4,101	5.96%
Total		68,810	100%

=== District 27 ===
The 27th district covers parts of Southern Moscow, including Nagatinsky Zaton, Tsaritsyno and part of Moskvorechye-Saburovo. Incumbent deputy Yelena Samyshina (United Russia) unsuccessfully ran in the 44th district, while former Moscow Fairs director Aleksandr Likhanov (United Russia) won this seat.

==== Candidates ====
===== Registered =====
- Irina Avdonina (Independent), self-employed
- Maksim Doronkin (CPRF), system administrator
- Aleksandr Fomin (LDPR), individual entrepreneur
- Yevgenia Gromova (SR–ZP), self-employed
- Andrey Lachkov (Independent), individual entrepreneur
- Aleksandr Likhanov (United Russia), Faculty of Humanities Deputy Dean at the Higher School of Economics, former Moscow Fairs director (2016–2022)
- Ivan Sitnikov (New People), Member of Danilovsky District Council of Deputies (2022–present), individual entrepreneur

===== Failed to qualify =====
- Filipp Fasolya (The Greens), educator

===== Declined =====
- Yelena Samyshina (United Russia), incumbent Member of Moscow City Duma for the 28th district (2019–present), city polyclinic chief doctor (running in the 44th district)

==== Results ====
Summary of the 6–8 September 2024 Moscow City Duma election in District 27
Candidate	Party	Votes	%
Aleksandr Likhanov	United Russia	30,963	48.21%
Maksim Doronkin	Communist Party	7,557	11.77%
Aleksandr Fomin	Liberal Democratic Party	6,809	10.60%
Yevgenia Gromova	A Just Russia – For Truth	6,374	9.92%
Ivan Sitnikov	New People	5,548	8.64%
Irina Avdonina	Independent	4,065	6.33%
Andrey Lachkov	Independent	2,885	4.49%
Total		64,227	100%

=== District 28 ===
The 28th district covers outer parts of Southern Moscow, including Biryulyovo Vostochnoye, Biryulyovo Zapadnoye and part of Chertanovo Yuzhnoye. Incumbent deputy Oleg Artemyev (United Russia) was re-elected to a second term in office.

==== Candidates ====
===== Registered =====
- Yekaterina Andrianova (Independent), cashier
- Yegor Anisimov (LDPR), Member of Mozhaysky District Council of Deputies (2022–present), former Member of State Duma (2013–2016), 2014 candidate in the 2nd district
- Oleg Artemyev (United Russia), incumbent Member of Moscow City Duma for the 29th district (2019–present), cosmonaut
- Yaroslavna Chalova (SR–ZP), individual entrepreneur
- Andrey Vasilchenkov (Communists of Russia), storekeeper
- Leonid Vorobyov (CPRF), ambulance paramedic
- Dmitry Voronin (New People), medical businessman

===== Withdrew =====
- Aleksey Mustakimov (The Greens), individual entrepreneur
- Mikhail Petrov (Independent), REU senior lecturer

===== Declined =====
- Vladimir Bernev (LDPR), businessman, 2019 candidate in the 32nd district

==== Results ====
Summary of the 6–8 September 2024 Moscow City Duma election in District 28
Candidate	Party	Votes	%
Oleg Artemyev (incumbent)	United Russia	39,375	48.93%
Leonid Vorobyov	Communist Party	13,671	16.99%
Yegor Anisimov	Liberal Democratic Party	7,490	9.31%
Yekaterina Andrianova	Independent	6,643	8.25%
Dmitry Voronin	New People	5,927	7.36%
Yaroslavna Chalova	A Just Russia – For Truth	4,155	5.16%
Andrey Vasilchenkov	Communists of Russia	3,162	3.93%
Total		80,476	100%

=== District 29 ===
The 29th district covers parts of Southern Moscow, including Chertanovo Severnoye, Chertanovo Tsentralnoye and part of Chertanovo Yuzhnoye. After redistricting the seat has two incumbents: Margarita Rusetskaya (United Russia) and Lyubov Nikitina (CPRF). Rusetskaya decided to retire, while Nikitina sought a second term in office and lost re-election to businessman Aleksey Kuchmin (United Russia).

==== Candidates ====
===== Registered =====
- Yekaterina Barinova (LDPR), businesswoman
- Maria Bazhenova (New People), nonprofit executive
- Tatyana Dementyeva (Communists of Russia), lawyer
- Andrey Ivanov (SR–ZP), individual entrepreneur
- Aleksey Kuchmin (United Russia), Member of Nagatino-Sadovniki District Council of Deputies (2022–present), construction materials businessman
- Svetlana Mitina (Independent), unemployed
- Lyubov Nikitina (CPRF), incumbent Member of Moscow City Duma for the 31st district (2019–present)
- Valentina Shevchenko (Independent), pensioner

===== Withdrew =====
- Aleksandr Markachev (Independent), engineer
- Denis Papin (Yabloko), aide to Yabloko chairman Nikolay Rybakov (withdrawn by the party July 9, 2024)

===== Declined =====
- Margarita Rusetskaya (United Russia), incumbent Member of Moscow City Duma for the 30th district (2019–present), former rector of the Pushkin Institute (2013–2022)
- Roman Yuneman (Independent), Leader of Society.Future (2020–present), 2019 runner-up in the 30th district

==== Results ====
Summary of the 6–8 September 2024 Moscow City Duma election in District 29
Candidate	Party	Votes	%
Aleksey Kuchmin	United Russia	31,914	44.31%
Maria Bazhenova	New People	8,604	11.95%
Lyubov Nikitina (incumbent)	Communist Party	8,289	11.51%
Yekaterina Barinova	Liberal Democratic Party	6,459	8.97%
Andrey Ivanov	A Just Russia – For Truth	5,783	8.03%
Tatyana Dementyeva	Communists of Russia	4,688	6.51%
Svetlana Mitina	Independent	3,287	4.56%
Valentina Shevchenko	Independent	2,937	4.08%
Total		72,028	100%

=== District 30 ===
The 30th district covers inner parts of Southern Moscow, including Danilovsky, Donskoy, Nagatino-Sadovniki and Nagorny. Incumbent deputy Olga Melnikova (United Russia) won re-election to a second term in office.

==== Candidates ====
===== Registered =====
- Tatyana Kim (CPRF), social teacher
- Aleksey Koshelev (Independent), engineer
- Olga Melnikova (United Russia), incumbent Member of Moscow City Duma for the 32nd district (2019–present), family services centre director
- Oleg Novikov (LDPR), Institute of State and Law researcher
- Ksenia Pustovaya (New People), education businesswoman
- Elina Zhgutova (SR–ZP), former Member of Civic Chamber of Russia (2017–2020), conservative activist

===== Failed to qualify =====
- Zoya Balinova (Communists of Russia), Member of Nekrasovskoye Municipal Council (2019–present), aide to Yaroslavl Oblast Duma member

==== Results ====
Summary of the 6–8 September 2024 Moscow City Duma election in District 30
Candidate	Party	Votes	%
Olga Melnikova (incumbent)	United Russia	34,034	48.50%
Oleg Novikov	Liberal Democratic Party	9,817	13.99%
Tatyana Kim	Communist Party	7,088	10.10%
Ksenia Pustovaya	New People	6,733	9.59%
Aleksey Koshelev	Independent	6,433	9.17%
Elina Zhgutova	A Just Russia – For Truth	6,023	8.58%
Total		70,179	100%

=== District 31 ===
The 31st district covers Yuzhnoye Butovo in South-Western Moscow and part of Shcherbinka in New Moscow. Incumbent deputy Lyudmila Guseva (United Russia) won re-election to a third term in office.

==== Candidates ====
===== Registered =====
- Lyudmila Guseva (United Russia), incumbent Member of Moscow City Duma for the 33rd district (2014–present)
- Andrey Kukhar (LDPR), attorney
- Yegor Mironov (SR–ZP), undergraduate student
- Pyotr Myagkov (CPRF), former Gazprom administrative department head, former Government of Russia official
- Mikhail Seleznev (New People), Moscow Metro revenue inspector
- Valentin Sokolov (Communists of Russia), self-employed

===== Withdrew =====
- Savely Moretsky (Independent), lawyer, Libertarian Party of Russia activist

==== Results ====
Summary of the 6–8 September 2024 Moscow City Duma election in District 31
Candidate	Party	Votes	%
Lyudmila Guseva (incumbent)	United Russia	40,699	53.10%
Mikhail Seleznev	New People	10,096	13.17%
Andrey Kukhar	Liberal Democratic Party	10,028	13.08%
Pyotr Myagkov	Communist Party	6,875	8.97%
Yegor Mironov	A Just Russia – For Truth	5,731	7.48%
Valentin Sokolov	Communists of Russia	3,195	4.17%
Total		76,648	100%

=== District 32 ===
The 32nd district covers outer parts of South-Western Moscow, including Severnoye Butovo and Yasenevo. Incumbent deputy Aleksandr Semennikov (United Russia) won re-election to a sixth term in office.

==== Candidates ====
===== Registered =====
- Margarita Ivanova (CPRF), community activist
- Yevgeny Kopayev (New People), RGGU associate professor
- Vitaly Naumenko (LDPR), Russian Army soldier, veteran of the Russian invasion of Ukraine
- Aleksandr Semennikov (United Russia), incumbent Member of Moscow City Duma for the 34th district (2001–present)
- Roksana Tumanova (SR–ZP), individual entrepreneur
- Oksana Yelizarova (Communists of Russia), self-employed

===== Declined =====
- Vitaly Radchenko (CPRF), local party secretary
- Maksim Zharkov (New People), Member of Yasenevo District Council of Deputies (2022–present), community activist

==== Results ====
Summary of the 6–8 September 2024 Moscow City Duma election in District 32
Candidate	Party	Votes	%
Aleksandr Semennikov (incumbent)	United Russia	35,656	49.50%
Yevgeny Kopayev	New People	10,377	14.40%
Vitaly Naumenko	Liberal Democratic Party	7,960	11.05%
Margarita Ivanova	Communist Party	6,943	9.64%
Roksana Tumanova	A Just Russia – For Truth	6,683	9.28%
Oksana Yelizarova	Communists of Russia	4,380	6.08%
Total		72,039	100%

=== District 33 ===
The 33rd district covers parts of South-Western Moscow, including Konkovo and Tyoply Stan. Incumbent deputy Natalia Metlina (My Moscow) was re-elected to a second term in office as a United Russia candidate.

==== Candidates ====
===== Registered =====
- Denis Azarko (Communists of Russia), individual entrepreneur
- Natalia Metlina (United Russia), incumbent Member of Moscow City Duma for the 35th district (2019–present), TV presenter
- Viktor Nikitin (SR–ZP), retired police major
- Yury Soldatov (New People), pensioner
- Maksim Volkov (LDPR), professional curling player
- Nikolay Volkov (CPRF), Moscow State University researcher, 2014 candidate in the 36th district

===== Failed to qualify =====
- Gleb Babich (Independent), RUDN trainee researcher

===== Withdrew =====
- Nina Andreyeva (Independent), genetic engineer
- Mikhail Gromov (Independent), former Member of Konkovo District Council of Deputies (2004–2022), 2009 United Russia candidate, 2014 and 2019 candidate in the 35th district
- Ksenia Sverdlova (Yabloko), party press secretary, former chairwoman of Saratov Oblast party office (2020–2021)

===== Declined =====
- Mikhail Tarantsov (CPRF), former Member of State Duma (1995–1999)

==== Results ====
Summary of the 6–8 September 2024 Moscow City Duma election in District 33
Candidate	Party	Votes	%
Natalia Metlina (incumbent)	United Russia	32,113	48.02%
Nikolay Volkov	Communist Party	11,353	16.98%
Yury Soldatov	New People	9,406	14.06%
Maksim Volkov	Liberal Democratic Party	7,879	11.78%
Viktor Nikitin	A Just Russia – For Truth	3,695	5.53%
Denis Azarko	Communists of Russia	2,348	3.51%
Total		66,876	100%

=== District 34 ===
The 34th district covers parts of South-Western Moscow, including Cheryomushki, Obruchevsky and Zyuzino. Incumbent deputy Olga Sharapova (United Russia) declined to seek a third term in office and was succeeded by community activist Yekaterina Razzakova (United Russia).

==== Candidates ====
===== Registered =====
- Aleksandr Baklanov (Communists of Russia), individual entrepreneur
- Roman Khudyakov (SR–ZP), former Member of State Duma (2011–2016), 2018 CHESTNO presidential candidate, 2019 CHESTNO candidate in the 37th district, 2021 Independent candidate in the 37th district
- Andrey Nesterenko (LDPR), individual entrepreneur
- Yekaterina Razzakova (United Russia), Member of Zyuzino District Council of Deputies (2022–present), community activist, 2021 candidate in the 37th district
- Andrey Seleznyov (CPRF), community activist, Left Front coordinator
- Dmitry Shumkin (New People), public relations specialist

===== Withdrew =====
- Dmitry Bakhlov (The Greens), former IT executive
- Valery Zheng (Independent), self-employed

===== Eliminated in the primary =====
- Denis Bespalov (United Russia), Head of Cheryomushki District (2023–present), narcologist

===== Declined =====
- Olga Sharapova (United Russia), incumbent Member of Moscow City Duma for the 36th district (2014–present), city hospital chief doctor

==== Results ====
Summary of the 6–8 September 2024 Moscow City Duma election in District 34
Candidate	Party	Votes	%
Yekaterina Razzakova	United Russia	36,424	52.03%
Dmitry Shumkin	New People	9,274	13.25%
Andrey Nesterenko	Liberal Democratic Party	7,466	10.66%
Andrey Seleznyov	Communist Party	6,603	9.43%
Roman Khudyakov	A Just Russia – For Truth	5,832	8.33%
Aleksandr Baklanov	Communists of Russia	4,356	6.22%
Total		70,009	100%

=== District 35 ===
The 35th district covers inner parts of South-Western Moscow, including Akademichesky, Gagarinsky, Kotlovka, Lomonosovsky. Incumbent deputy Vladimir Ryzhkov (Yabloko) resigned in January 2024 and was succeeded by Russian Space Research Institute director Anatoly Petrukovich (United Russia).

==== Candidates ====
===== Registered =====
- Sergey Antonov (Communists of Russia), self-employed, perennial candidate
- Maksim Chirkov (SR–ZP), Member of Gagarinsky District Council of Deputies (2004–present), 2009 candidate in the 14th district, 2019 candidate in the 34th district, 2021 candidate in the 37th district
- Aleksandr Kondratenko (CPRF), MSU assistant professor
- Anatoly Petrukovich (United Russia), director of the Russian Space Research Institute (2018–present)
- Olga Sabirova (New People), attorney
- Gleb Trubin (LDPR), Member of Tyumen Oblast Duma (2011–present)

===== Withdrew =====
- Igor Alabuzhin (The Greens), climate expert
- Vladimir Kalinin (Yabloko), former Member of Lomonosovsky District Council of Deputies (2017–2022), 2019 A Just Russia runner-up in the 26th district
- Yekaterina Silayeva (Independent), former Member of Severnoye Izmaylovo District Council of Deputies (2017–2022), psychologist
- Vladislav Voronov (Independent), homemaker

===== Declined =====
- Aleksandra Adamova (New People), businesswoman

==== Results ====
Summary of the 6–8 September 2024 Moscow City Duma election in District 35
Candidate	Party	Votes	%
Anatoly Petrukovich	United Russia	30,650	44.97%
Aleksandr Kondratenko	Communist Party	10,586	15.53%
Olga Sabirova	New People	10,063	14.77%
Maksim Chirkov	A Just Russia – For Truth	8,017	11.76%
Gleb Trubin	Liberal Democratic Party	5,299	7.78%
Sergey Antonov	Communists of Russia	3,468	5.09%
Total		68,151	100%

=== District 36 ===
The 36th district covers inner parts of Novomoskovsky Administrative Okrug, including Moskovsky, Mosrentgen, Ryazanovskoye, Sosenskoye, Voskresenskoye and part of Shcherbinka. Incumbent deputy Aleksandr Kozlov (United Russia) won re-election to a second term in office.

==== Candidates ====
===== Registered =====
- Yelena Chekan (CPRF), lawyer, aide to State Duma member Olga Alimova
- Aleksandr Kozlov (United Russia), incumbent Member of Moscow City Duma for the 38th district (2019–present), housing and communal services expert
- Aleksey Lapshov (LDPR), businessman, aide to State Duma member Boris Paykin
- Igor Lipin (SR–ZP), postgraduate student
- Mikhail Trushin (Independent), self-employed
- Sergey Tumasov (New People), real estate executive

===== Withdrew after registration =====
- Yulia Yevgrafova (Independent), laboratory assistant

===== Withdrew =====
- Viktor Lyust (Independent), businessman

==== Results ====
Summary of the 6–8 September 2024 Moscow City Duma election in District 36
Candidate	Party	Votes	%
Aleksandr Kozlov (incumbent)	United Russia	43,528	50.50%
Aleksey Lapshov	Liberal Democratic Party	11,175	12.97%
Yelena Chekan	Communist Party	10,321	11.97%
Sergey Tumasov	New People	8,074	9.37%
Mikhail Trushin	Independent	6,637	7.70%
Igor Lipin	A Just Russia – For Truth	5,929	6.88%
Total		86,189	100%

=== District 37 ===
The 37th district covers Western Moscow exclave of Vnukovo, all of Troitsky Administrative Okrug and outer parts of Novomoskovsky Administrative Okrug, including Desyonovskoye, Filimonkovskoye, Kiyevsky, Klyonovskoye, Kokoshkino, Krasnopakhorskoye, Marushkinskoye, Mikhaylovo-Yartsevskoye, Novofyodorovskoye, Pervomayskoye, Rogovskoye, Shchapovskoye, Troitsk and Voronovskoye. Incumbent deputy Valery Golovchenko (My Moscow) won re-election to a second term in office as a United Russia candidate.

==== Candidates ====
===== Registered =====
- Natalia Andrusenko (Communists of Russia), pensioner, 2019 candidate in the 38th district
- Aleksey Bayramov (CPRF), medical insurance expert
- Valery Golovchenko (United Russia), incumbent Member of Moscow City Duma for the 39th district (2019–present), transportation businessman
- Sergey Kovalev (New People), Sberbank engineer
- Nadezhda Leontyeva (LDPR), individual entrepreneur
- Ruslan Shalamov (SR–ZP), deputy chief of staff to party regional office, nonprofit executive
- Viktor Sidnev (Independent), former Head of Troitsk (2003–2011), 2014 Civic Platform runner-up in the 39th district

===== Withdrew =====
- Artyom Trunin (Independent), ecological foundation director

===== Declined =====
- Oleg Novikov (Independent), Institute of State and Law researcher (running as LDPR candidate in the 30th district)

==== Results ====
Summary of the 6–8 September 2024 Moscow City Duma election in District 37
Candidate	Party	Votes	%
Valery Golovchenko (incumbent)	United Russia	39,969	49.69%
Viktor Sidnev	Independent	9,485	11.79%
Sergey Kovalev	New People	8,983	11.17%
Nadezhda Leontyeva	Liberal Democratic Party	8,093	10.06%
Ruslan Shalamov	A Just Russia – For Truth	5,482	6.82%
Natalia Andrusenko	Communists of Russia	5,036	6.26%
Aleksey Bayramov	Communist Party	3,333	4.14%
Total		80,440	100%

=== District 38 ===
The 38th district covers parts of Western Moscow outside the Moscow Ring Road: Novo-Peredelkino and Solntsevo, as well as Vnukovskoye in the Novomoskovsky Administrative Okrug. Political advisor Maria Voropayeva (Independent) won this open seat.

==== Candidates ====
===== Registered =====
- Mikhail Gusenkov (CPRF), pensioner
- Yelena Lisovskaya (New People), auto blogger
- Sergey Usoltsev (SR–ZP), individual entrepreneur
- Maria Voropayeva (Independent), advisor to LDPR leader Leonid Slutsky

===== Withdrew after registration =====
- Aleksandra Sinyavina (United Russia), kindergarten teacher (withdrew August 9, 2024)

===== Withdrew =====
- Erika Yablokova (Independent), individual entrepreneur, community activist

==== Results ====
Summary of the 6–8 September 2024 Moscow City Duma election in District 38
Candidate	Party	Votes	%
Maria Voropayeva	Independent	35,410	42.78%
Yelena Lisovskaya	New People	20,838	25.18%
Mikhail Gusenkov	Communist Party	18,364	22.19%
Sergey Usoltsev	A Just Russia – For Truth	8,146	9.84%
Total		82,769	100%

=== District 39 ===
The 39th district covers parts of Western Moscow, including Prospekt Vernadskogo, Troparyovo-Nikulino and part of Ramenki. Singer Rodion Gazmanov (United Russia) won this open seat.

==== Candidates ====
===== Registered =====
- Rodion Gazmanov (United Russia), singer, TV host, son of singer Oleg Gazmanov
- Vladimir Lobanov (Communists of Russia), businessman
- Aleksandr Mikhaylovsky (SR–ZP), former Member of Troparyovo-Nikulino District Council of Deputies (2004–2017), cooperative chairman, 2019 candidate in the 40th district
- Ivan Mokshin (Independent), self-employed, democratic socialist activist
- Irina Rodkina (New People), Member of Troparyovo-Nikulino District Council of Deputies (2022–present), individual entrepreneur
- Boris Spirin (LDPR), Member of Ramenki District Council of Deputies (2022–present), nonprofit executive

===== Withdrew after registration =====
- Igor Sukhanov (CPRF), aide to Moscow City Duma member (disqualified on July 27, 2024, due to administrative conviction)

===== Withdrew =====
- Vasily Dikarev (Yabloko), Member of Yakimanka District Council of Deputies (2017–present), MSU laboratory engineer
- Yury Kurnosov (Independent), national security analyst, retired FSB colonel
- Dmitry Trunin (Independent), former Member of Krivtsovo Council of Deputies (2013–2018), attorney, perennial candidate

===== Declined =====
- Arkady Pavlinov (SR–ZP), former Member of Danilovsky District Council of Deputies (2017–2022), community activist, 2019 runner-up in the 28th district

==== Results ====
Summary of the 6–8 September 2024 Moscow City Duma election in District 39
Candidate	Party	Votes	%
Rodion Gazmanov	United Russia	27,259	47.02%
Irina Rodkina	New People	9,340	16.11%
Aleksandr Mikhaylovsky	A Just Russia – For Truth	6,520	11.25%
Boris Spirin	Liberal Democratic Party	5,949	10.26%
Vladimir Lobanov	Communists of Russia	5,460	9.42%
Ivan Mokshin	Independent	3,412	5.89%
Total		57,973	100%

=== District 40 ===
The 40th district covers parts of Western Moscow, including Ochakovo-Matveyevskoye, parts of Ramenki and Mozhaysky. Incumbent deputy Tatyana Batysheva (United Russia) was re-elected to a third term in office.

==== Candidates ====
===== Registered =====
- Ivan Arkhipov (CPRF), Member of Ramenki District Council of Deputies (2022–present), grandson of Ivan Arkhipov
- Tatyana Batysheva (United Russia), incumbent Member of Moscow City Duma (2014–present), pediatric neuropsychiatry centre director
- Konstantin Bulavitsky (SR–ZP), assistant secretary
- Igor Sharapov (New People), businessman
- Vsevolod Voronin (LDPR), self-employed

===== Failed to qualify =====
- Tatyana Pirozhkova (Independent), retired judge

===== Withdrew =====
- Yevgeny Lyapin (Independent), self-employed
- Diana Yakovleva (Independent), former Member of Lobnya Council of Deputies (2016–2021), attorney, perennial candidate

===== Declined =====
- Shamil Amirov (Yabloko), aide to Moscow City Duma member Yevgeny Bunimovich, 2009 candidate (did not file)

==== Results ====
Summary of the 6–8 September 2024 Moscow City Duma election in District 40
Candidate	Party	Votes	%
Tatyana Batysheva (incumbent)	United Russia	30,215	50.62%
Igor Sharapov	New People	9,803	16.42%
Ivan Arkhipov	Communist Party	8,533	14.30%
Vsevolod Voronin	Liberal Democratic Party	7,742	12.97%
Konstantin Bulavitsky	A Just Russia – For Truth	3,358	5.63%
Total		59,684	100%

=== District 41 ===
The 41st district covers outer parts of Western Moscow, including Krylatskoye, parts of Kuntsevo and Mozhaysky. Incumbent deputy Yevgeny Gerasimov (United Russia) was re-elected to a sixth term in office.

==== Candidates ====
===== Registered =====
- Valery Budkin (LDPR), lawyer
- Yevgeny Gerasimov (United Russia), incumbent Member of Moscow City Duma (2001–present)
- Maria Gorbulina (New People), community activist
- Konstantin Konkov (SR–ZP), Member of Mozhaysky District Council of Deputies (2022–present), IT engineer
- Natalya Kryuchkova (CPRF), Member of Krylatskoye District Council of Deputies (2022–present)

===== Withdrew =====
- Yury Sheyn (Yabloko), party official, former journalist

===== Declined =====
- Vladislava Gorshkova (SR–ZP), Member of Krylatskoye District Council of Deputies (2017–present), ecological activist

==== Results ====
Summary of the 6–8 September 2024 Moscow City Duma election in District 41
Candidate	Party	Votes	%
Yevgeny Gerasimov (incumbent)	United Russia	34,416	52.89%
Natalya Kryuchkova	Communist Party	8,260	12.69%
Valery Budkin	Liberal Democratic Party	8,240	12.66%
Maria Gorbulina	New People	7,262	11.16%
Konstantin Konkov	A Just Russia – For Truth	6,868	10.55%
Total		65,071	100%

=== District 42 ===
The 42nd district covers inner parts of Western Moscow, including Dorogomilovo, Fili-Davydkovo and Filyovsky Park. Incumbent deputy Yekaterina Yengalycheva (CPRF) was deselected at the party convention and was succeeded by Olympic figure skater Irina Slutskaya (United Russia).

==== Candidates ====
===== Registered =====
- Yekaterina Bazanova (New People), individual entrepreneur
- Sergey Bykov (SR–ZP), unemployed
- Ivan Kurguzov (LDPR), community activist, business association executive
- Irina Slutskaya (United Russia), former Member of Moscow Oblast Duma (2016–2021), Olympic figure skater, wife of State Duma member Aleksey Govyrin
- Andrey Staroverov (CPRF), engineer

===== Failed to qualify =====
- Kirill Goncharov (Yabloko), party official, 2014 and 2019 candidate in the 32nd district

===== Withdrew =====
- Ivan Arkhipov (Independent), college student

===== Declined =====
- Anton Brezhnev (New People), Member of Filyovsky Park District Council of Deputies (2022–present), consultant
- Tatyana Bykhalova (SR–ZP), pensioner
- Anna Sevastyanova (LDPR), aide to State Duma member, party activist (running in the 43rd district)
- Yekaterina Yengalycheva (CPRF), incumbent Member of Moscow City Duma (2019–present), businesswoman

==== Results ====
Summary of the 6–8 September 2024 Moscow City Duma election in District 42
Candidate	Party	Votes	%
Irina Slutskaya	United Russia	28,742	53.43%
Andrey Staroverov	Communist Party	8,465	15.74%
Yekaterina Bazanova	New People	7,472	13.89%
Ivan Kurguzov	Liberal Democratic Party	6,150	11.43%
Sergey Bykov	A Just Russia – For Truth	2,934	5.45%
Total		53,796	100%

=== District 43 ===
The 43rd district covers Presnensky in Central Moscow and Khoroshyovo-Mnyovniki in North-Western Moscow. Incumbent deputy Roman Babayan (My Moscow) declined to seek a second term in office and was succeeded by Moscow Zoo director Svetlana Akulova (United Russia).

==== Candidates ====
===== Registered =====
- Svetlana Akulova (United Russia), general director of Moscow Zoo (2016–present)
- Sergey Chvyrov (New People), medical businessman, accountant
- Aleksandr Ishchenko (CPRF), aide to State Duma member, IT executive
- Anna Sevastyanova (LDPR), aide to State Duma member, party activist
- Yury Zagrebnoy (SR–ZP), former Member of Moscow City Duma for the 31st district (1997–2001), journalist
- Dmitry Zakharov (Independent), former Member of Yakimanka District Council of Deputies (2012–2017), 2014 A Just Russia candidate in the 14th district, 2019 Communists of Russia candidate in the 20th district

===== Failed to qualify =====
- Maria Chuprina (Yabloko), aide to Moscow City Duma member Sergey Mitrokhin

===== Withdrew =====
- Ruslan Akhmadiyev (Independent), homemaker
- Georgy Slyvus (The Greens), individual entrepreneur
- Denis Zommer (Communists of Russia), United Communist Party secretary, 2019 candidate in the 13th district

===== Eliminated in the primary =====
- Yevgeny Babenko (United Russia), Member of Arbat District Council of Deputies (2012–2022), former Head of Arbat District (2012–2022)
- Natalya Sklyarova (United Russia), Member of Presnensky District Council of Deputies (2022–present), director of the Bulgakov House museum (2004–present)

===== Declined =====
- Roman Babayan (United Russia), incumbent Member of Moscow City Duma for the 5th district (2019–present), TV presenter, journalist
- Anatoly Yushin (New People), former Member of Presnensky District Council of Deputies (2017–2022), attorney, 2019 Independent candidate for this seat

==== Results ====
Summary of the 6–8 September 2024 Moscow City Duma election in District 43
Candidate	Party	Votes	%
Svetlana Akulova	United Russia	34,997	54.09%
Aleksandr Ishchenko	Communist Party	9,982	15.43%
Sergey Chvyrov	New People	5,767	8.91%
Dmitry Zakharov	Independent	5,476	8.46%
Yury Zagrebnoy	A Just Russia – For Truth	4,502	6.96%
Anna Sevastyanova	Liberal Democratic Party	3,909	6.04%
Total		64,703	100%

=== District 44 ===
The 44th district covers southern parts of Central Moscow, including Khamovniki, Tagansky, Yakimanka and Zamoskvorechye. Incumbent two-term deputy Sergey Mitrokhin (Yabloko) failed to collect enough signatures to be registered and was succeeded by businessman Aleksandr Davankov (New People).

==== Candidates ====
===== Registered =====
- Aleksandr Davankov (New People), cosmetics businessman, uncle of State Duma member Vladislav Davankov
- Yevgeny Golovin (LDPR), company advisor
- Yelena Samyshina (United Russia), incumbent Member of Moscow City Duma for the 28th district (2019–present), city polyclinic chief doctor
- Vitaly Semenenko (Independent), unemployed, 2019 candidate in the 45th district
- Ilya Sviridov (SR–ZP), Member of Tagansky District Council of Deputies (2012–present), former Head of Tagansky District (2014–2021), 2014 and 2019 runner-up for this seat, 2018 mayoral candidate
- Andrey Voronkov (CPRF), Member of Khamovniki District Council of Deputies (2012–present), architect

===== Withdrew =====
- Sergey Mitrokhin (Yabloko), incumbent Member of Moscow City Duma for the 43rd district (2005–2009, 2019–present), 2013 and 2018 mayoral candidate (endorsed Davankov)

===== Disqualified =====
- Pavel Ivanov (CPRF), Member of Basmanny District Council of Deputies (2022–present) (listed as foreign agent on May 31, 2024)

===== Eliminated in the primary =====
- Karen Aperyan (United Russia), Head of Tagansky District (2021–present)

==== Results ====
Summary of the 6–8 September 2024 Moscow City Duma election in District 44
Candidate	Party	Votes	%
Aleksandr Davankov	New People	17,884	30.88%
Yelena Samyshina	United Russia	14,895	25.72%
Ilya Sviridov	A Just Russia – For Truth	9,074	15.67%
Andrey Voronkov	Communist Party	8,269	14.28%
Yevgeny Golovin	Liberal Democratic Party	4,823	8.33%
Vitaly Semenenko	Independent	2,922	5.05%
Total		57,908	100%

=== District 45 ===
The 45th district covers northern parts of Central Moscow, including Arbat, Basmanny, Krasnoselsky, Meshchansky and Tverskoy. After redistricting the seat has two incumbents: SR–ZP faction chairman Magomet Yandiev sought re-election to a second term, while Yelena Shuvalova (Independent) failed to collect enough signatures to be registered. Yandiev lost to emergency rescue activist Maksim Dzhetygenov (United Russia).

==== Candidates ====
===== Registered =====
- Maksim Dzhetygenov (United Russia), State University of Management emergency operations and military training centre director
- Roman Krastelev (LDPR), Member of Krasnoyarsk City Council of Deputies (2018–present)
- Lesya Nechiporuk (New People), community activist
- Kirill Okhapkin (CPRF), aide to State Duma member Anastasia Udaltsova
- Nikita Ostrankov (Communists of Russia), pensioner, 2019 candidate in this seat
- Magomet Yandiev (SR–ZP), incumbent Member of Moscow City Duma (2019–present), chairman of A Just Russia faction (2019–present)

===== Withdrew =====
- Zukhra Balyayeva (Independent), social worker
- Gleb Biserov (Independent), Institute of Philosophy junior researcher
- Grigory Grishin (Yabloko), advisor to Yabloko chairman Nikolay Rybakov, documentary filmmaker
- Ketevan Kharaidze (Independent), former Member of Tverskoy District Council of Deputies (2017–2023), 2019 candidate in the 44th district
- Aleksey Nizov (Independent), community activist
- Yelena Shuvalova (Independent), incumbent Member of Moscow City Duma for the 44th district (2014–present)

==== Results ====
Summary of the 6–8 September 2024 Moscow City Duma election in District 45
Candidate	Party	Votes	%
Maksim Dzhetygenov	United Russia	24,384	40.56%
Lesya Nechiporuk	New People	9,141	15.20%
Roman Krastelev	Liberal Democratic Party	8,953	14.89%
Kirill Okhapkin	Communist Party	7,734	12.86%
Magomet Yandiev (incumbent)	A Just Russia – For Truth	6,078	10.11%
Nikita Ostrankov	Communists of Russia	3,541	5.89%
Total		60,119	100%

== See also ==
- 2024 Russian elections
