= Moscow City Duma District 30 =

Moscow City Duma electoral constituency

- Moscow City Duma constituency
- Deputy: Olga Melnikova; United Russia
- Administrative Okrug: Southern
- Districts: Danilovsky, Donskoy, Nagatino-Sadovniki, Nagorny
- Voters: 180,097 (2024)

Moscow City Duma District 30 is one of 45 constituencies in Moscow City Duma. Currently the district covers inner parts of Southern Moscow.

The district has been represented since 2024 by United Russia deputy Olga Melnikova, a two-term incumbent and family services centre director, who was redistricted from District 32.

== Boundaries ==
District boundaries from 2014 to 2024

1993–1997: Dorogomilovsky (Note: merged with Kutuzovsky District to form Dorogomilovo District in 1994), Matveyevskoye (Note: merged to form Ochakovo-Matveyevskoye District in 1997), Mosfilmovsky (Note: merged with Ramenki District in 1997), Ochakovo, Prospekt Vernadskogo, Ramenki
The district covered parts of Western Moscow.

1997–2001: Ochakovo-Matveyevskoye, Prospekt Vernadskogo, Ramenki, TEOS MGU
The district continued to cover parts of Western Moscow, but ceded its part of Dorogomilovo to District 31.

2001–2005: Mozhaysky, Ochakovo-Matveyevskoye, Prospekt Vernadskogo
The district changed significantly as it swapped Ramenki for Mozhaysky District with the neighbouring District 31.

2005–2014: constituency abolished
Prior to the 2005 election the number of constituencies was reduced to 15, so the district was eliminated.

2014–2024: Chertanovo Tsentralnoye, Chertanovo Yuzhnoye
The district was created prior to the 2014 election, after Moscow City Duma had been expanded from 35 to 45 seats. It covers parts of Chertanovo in Southern Moscow.

2024–present: Danilovsky, Donskoy, Nagatino-Sadovniki, Nagorny
During the 2023–24 Moscow redistricting the territory of the district became the base for new District 29, except for a northeastern corner of Chertanovo Yuzhnoye, which was ceded to District 28. In its new configuration the district covers most of former District 32 (Danilovsky, Donskoy, Nagatino-Sadovniki) as well as Nagorny District from the eliminated District 31.

== Members elected ==
Election	Member	Party
1993	Alevtina Nikitina	Choice of Russia
1997	Alevtina Nikitina	Independent
2001	Aleksandr Tarnavsky	Independent
2005	Constituency eliminated	
2009	Constituency eliminated	
2014	Aleksey Mishin	Independent
2019	Margarita Rusetskaya	Independent
2024	Olga Melnikova	United Russia

== Election results ==
=== 2001 ===
Summary of the 16 December 2001 Moscow City Duma election in District 30
Candidate	Party	Votes	%
Aleksandr Tarnavsky	Independent	24,128	41.52%
Leonid Olshansky	Independent	11,885	20.45%
Aleksey Suloyev	Independent	5,731	9.86%
Oleg Shmatov	Russian United Industrial Party	3,735	6.45%
Yevgeny Yankovsky	Independent	1,399	2.41%
against all		8,986	15.46%
Total		58,553	100%

=== 2014 ===
Summary of the 14 September 2014 Moscow City Duma election in District 30
Candidate	Party	Votes	%
Aleksey Mishin	Independent	16,069	50.61%
Denis Davydov	Communist Party	5,417	17.06%
Yelena Repkina	Independent	3,860	12.16%
Dmitry Novikov	Yabloko	2,352	7.41%
Sergey Yeliseyev	Liberal Democratic Party	1,645	5.18%
Marina Ponyakhina	A Just Russia	1,489	4.69%
Total		31,751	100%

=== 2019 ===
Summary of the 8 September 2019 Moscow City Duma election in District 30
Candidate	Party	Votes	%
Margarita Rusetskaya	Independent	9,645	28.61%
Roman Yuneman	Independent	9,561	28.36%
Vladislav Zhukovsky	Communist Party	8,346	24.76%
Pyotr Vikulin	Communists of Russia	2,641	7.83%
Ilya Galibin	Liberal Democratic Party	1,387	4.11%
Aleksey Tsyba	A Just Russia	1,156	3.43%
Total		33,713	100%

=== 2024 ===
Summary of the 6–8 September 2024 Moscow City Duma election in District 30
Candidate	Party	Votes	%
Olga Melnikova (incumbent) (Note: redistricted from District 32)	United Russia	34,034	48.50%
Oleg Novikov	Liberal Democratic Party	9,817	13.99%
Tatyana Kim	Communist Party	7,088	10.10%
Ksenia Pustovaya	New People	6,733	9.59%
Aleksey Koshelev	Independent	6,433	9.17%
Elina Zhgutova	A Just Russia – For Truth	6,023	8.58%
Total		70,179	100%
