= Moscow City Duma District 31 =

Moscow City Duma electoral constituency

- Moscow City Duma constituency
- Deputy: Lyudmila Guseva; United Russia
- Administrative Okrug: Novomoskovsky, South-Western
- Districts: part of Shcherbinka, Yuzhnoye Butovo
- Voters: 172,174 (2024)

Moscow City Duma District 31 is one of 45 constituencies in Moscow City Duma. Currently the district covers Yuzhnoye Butovo in South-Western Moscow and parts of Shcherbinka.

The district has been represented since 2024 by City Duma Deputy Chairwoman and United Russia deputy Lyudmila Guseva, a three-term member, who was redistricted from District 33.

== Boundaries ==
District boundaries from 2014 to 2024

1993–1997: Fili-Davydkovo, Kutusovzky, (Note: merged with Dorogomilovsky District to form Dorogomilovo District in 1994) Mozhaysky
The district covered parts of Western Moscow along the Kutuzovsky Prospekt.

1997–2001: Dorogomilovo, Fili-Davydkovo, Mozhaysky
The district continued to cover parts of Western Moscow along the Kutuzovsky Prospekt, gaining the rest of Dorogomilovo (former Dorogomilovsky District) from District 30.

2001–2005: Dorogomilovo, Fili-Davydkovo, Ramenki, TEOS MGU (Note: merged into Ramenki District in 2002)
The district changed significantly as it swapped Mozhaysky District in the west for Ramenki to its south with the neighbouring District 30.

2005–2014: constituency abolished
Prior to the 2005 election the number of constituencies was reduced to 15, so the district was eliminated.

2014–2024: Chertanovo Severnoye, Nagorny, parts of Zyuzino
The district was created prior to the 2014 election, after Moscow City Duma had been expanded from 35 to 45 seats. It covers parts of Southern Moscow as well as parts of Zyuzino in South-Western Moscow.

2024–present: part of Shcherbinka, Yuzhnoye Butovo
During the 2023–24 Moscow redistricting the district was virtually eliminated as its former territory was divided between districts District 29, District 30 and District 34. In its new configuration the district covers the entirety of Southern Butovo (former District 33) and parts of Shcherbinka in New Moscow (former District 38).

== Members elected ==
Election	Member	Party
1993	Valery Pavlov (Note: appointed Deputy Head of State Taxation Service in July 1995)	Party of Russian Unity and Accord
1995	Olga Sergeyeva	Independent
1997	Yury Zagrebnoy	Independent
2001	Yevgeny Gerasimov	Independent
2005	Constituency eliminated	
2009	Constituency eliminated	
2014	Sergey Zverev	United Russia
2019	Lyubov Nikitina	Communist Party
2024	Lyudmila Guseva	United Russia

== Election results ==
=== 2001 ===
Summary of the 16 December 2001 Moscow City Duma election in District 31
Candidate	Party	Votes	%
Yevgeny Gerasimov	Independent	12,786	24.01%
Olga Sergeyeva	Russian Communist Workers' Party	7,319	13.74%
Sergey Bochkov	Independent	6,524	12.25%
Yevgeny Shevalovsky	Independent	4,444	8.34%
Yury Zagrebnoy (incumbent)	Independent	4,356	8.18%
Vadim Isthmian	Independent	3,701	6.95%
Svetlana Silkina	Independent	2,694	5.06%
Aleksandr Gerasimov	Independent	2,124	3.99%
against all		7,902	14.84%
Total		53,635	100%

=== 2014 ===
Summary of the 14 September 2014 Moscow City Duma election in District 31
Candidate	Party	Votes	%
Sergey Zverev	United Russia	16,018	52.34%
Aleksandr Kurafeyev	Communist Party	4,536	14.82%
Varvara Gryaznova	Yabloko	4,259	13.92%
Oleg Sukhov	Independent	2,288	7.48%
Sergey Anokhin	A Just Russia	1,346	4.40%
Anna Novikova	Liberal Democratic Party	1,033	3.38%
Total		30,603	100%

=== 2019 ===
Summary of the 8 September 2019 Moscow City Duma election in District 31
Candidate	Party	Votes	%
Lyubov Nikitina	Communist Party	13,173	44.22%
Sergey Zverev (incumbent)	Independent	8,774	29.45%
Andrey Mileshin	Communists of Russia	2,669	8.96%
Yulia Zhandarova	A Just Russia	2,349	7.89%
Yulia Shmantsar	Liberal Democratic Party	1,755	5.89%
Total		29,789	100%

=== 2024 ===
Summary of the 6–8 September 2024 Moscow City Duma election in District 31
Candidate	Party	Votes	%
Lyudmila Guseva (incumbent) (Note: redistricted from District 33)	United Russia	40,699	53.10%
Mikhail Seleznev	New People	10,096	13.17%
Andrey Kukhar	Liberal Democratic Party	10,028	13.08%
Pyotr Myagkov	Communist Party	6,875	8.97%
Yegor Mironov	A Just Russia – For Truth	5,731	7.48%
Valentin Sokolov	Communists of Russia	3,195	4.17%
Total		76,648	100%
