= Mozhaysky =

Mozhaysky (masculine), Mozhayskaya (feminine), or Mozhayskoye (neuter) may refer to:

- Mozhaysky District, several districts in Russia
- Mozhaysky Municipal Okrug, a municipal formation which Mozhaysky District of the federal city of Moscow, Russia is incorporated as
- Mozhaysky (rural locality) (Mozhayskoye, Mozhayskaya), several rural localities in Russia
- Alexander Mozhaysky, Russian military officer and inventor
