= Moscow City Duma District 29 =

Moscow City Duma electoral constituency

- Moscow City Duma constituency
- Deputy: Aleksey Kuchmin; United Russia
- Administrative Okrug: Southern
- Districts: Chertanovo Severnoye, Chertanovo Tsentralnoye, part of Chertanovo Yuzhnoye
- Voters: 176,109 (2024)

Moscow City Duma District 29 is one of 45 constituencies in Moscow City Duma. Currently the district covers outer parts of Southern Moscow.

The district has been represented since 2024 by United Russia deputy Aleksey Kuchmin, a construction materials businessman and municipal deputy, who defeated one-term Communist incumbent Lyubov Nikitina from District 31.

== Boundaries ==
District boundaries from 2014 to 2024

1993–2005: Novo-Peredelkino, Solntsevo, Troparyovo-Nikulino, Vnukovo
The district covered parts of Western Moscow, including Novo-Peredelkino and Solntsevo outside the Moscow Ring Road as well as Vnukovo Settlement exclave.

2005–2014: constituency abolished
Prior to the 2005 election the number of constituencies was reduced to 15, so the district was eliminated.

2014–2024: Biryulyovo Vostochnoye, Biryulyovo Zapadnoye, parts of Tsaritsyno
The district was created prior to the 2014 election, after Moscow City Duma had been expanded from 35 to 45 seats. It covers outer parts of Southern Moscow in Biryulyovo and parts of Tsaritsyno.

2024–present: Chertanovo Severnoye, Chertanovo Tsentralnoye, part of Chertanovo Yuzhnoye
During the 2023–24 Moscow redistricting the territory of the district became the base for District 28, except for part of Tsaritsyno which was moved to District 27. In its new configuration the district covers most of former District 30 (except for a northeastern corner of Chertanovo Yuzhnoye), as well as Chertanovo Severnoye from the dismantled District 31.

== Members elected ==
Election	Member	Party
1993	Vladimir Platonov	Choice of Russia
1997	Vladimir Platonov	Independent
2001	Vladimir Platonov	Union of Right Forces
2005	Constituency eliminated	
2009	Constituency eliminated	
2014	Nina Minko	Independent
2019	Oleg Artemyev	Independent
2024	Aleksey Kuchmin	United Russia

== Election results ==
=== 2001 ===
Summary of the 16 December 2001 Moscow City Duma election in District 29
Candidate	Party	Votes	%
Vladimir Platonov (incumbent)	Union of Right Forces	34,246	59.53%
Viktor Anpilov	Independent	11,634	20.22%
Andrey Priyatkin	Independent	1,391	2.42%
against all		8,460	14.71%
Total		57,931	100%

=== 2014 ===
Summary of the 14 September 2014 Moscow City Duma election in District 29
Candidate	Party	Votes	%
Nina Minko	Independent	10,941	36.18%
Aleksandr Medvedev	Communist Party	7,274	24.05%
Ivan Petrov	Liberal Democratic Party	4,835	15.99%
Gennady Gendin	A Just Russia	4,054	13.41%
Yury Porokhovnichenko	Yabloko	1,308	4.33%
Viktor Sonkin	Independent	815	2.70%
Total		30,240	100%

=== 2019 ===
Summary of the 8 September 2019 Moscow City Duma election in District 29
Candidate	Party	Votes	%
Oleg Artemyev	Independent	11,560	41.52%
Nikolay Sergeyev	Communist Party	9,288	33.36%
Boris Chernyshov	Liberal Democratic Party	3,510	12.61%
Sergey Zhuravsky	A Just Russia	2,337	8.39%
Total		27,843	100%

=== 2024 ===
Summary of the 6–8 September 2024 Moscow City Duma election in District 29
Candidate	Party	Votes	%
Aleksey Kuchmin	United Russia	31,914	44.31%
Maria Bazhenova	New People	8,604	11.95%
Lyubov Nikitina (incumbent) (Note: redistricted from District 31)	Communist Party	8,289	11.51%
Yekaterina Barinova	Liberal Democratic Party	6,459	8.97%
Andrey Ivanov	A Just Russia – For Truth	5,783	8.03%
Tatyana Dementyeva	Communists of Russia	4,688	6.51%
Svetlana Mitina	Independent	3,287	4.56%
Valentina Shevchenko	Independent	2,937	4.08%
Total		72,028	100%
