= Moscow City Duma District 28 =

Moscow City Duma electoral constituency

- Moscow City Duma constituency
- Deputy: Oleg Artemyev; United Russia
- Administrative Okrug: Southern
- Districts: part of Chertanovo Yuzhnoye, Biryulyovo Vostochnoye, Biryulyovo Zapadnoye
- Voters: 187,595 (2024)

Moscow City Duma District 28 is one of 45 constituencies in Moscow City Duma. Currently the district has covered outer parts of Southern Moscow.

The district has been represented since 2024 by United Russia deputy Oleg Artemyev, a two-term incumbent and an active cosmonaut, who was redistricted from District 29.

== Boundaries ==
District boundaries from 2014 to 2024

1993–2001: Konkovo, Tyoply Stan
The district covered parts of South-Western Moscow.

2001–2005: Konkovo, Tyoply Stan, part of Yasenevo
The district continued to cover parts of South-Western Moscow, gaining part of Yasenevo from District 27.

2005–2014: constituency abolished
Prior to the 2005 election the number of constituencies was reduced to 15, so the district was eliminated.

2014–2024: Moskvorechye-Saburovo, parts of Nagatinsky Zaton, parts of Tsaritsyno
The district was created prior to the 2014 election, after Moscow City Duma had been expanded from 35 to 45 seats. It covers parts of Southern Moscow.

2024–present: part of Chertanovo Yuzhnoye, Biryulyovo Vostochnoye, Biryulyovo Zapadnoye
During the 2023–24 Moscow redistricting most of the territory of the district was placed into District 27, except for eastern Moskvorechye-Saburovo, which was put into District 25. In its new configuration the district covers most of former District 29 (Biryulyovo) as well as part of Chertanovo Yuzhnoye (from the former District 30).

== Members elected ==
Election	Member	Party
1993	Vladimir Plotnikov (Note: appointed to the Federation Council in October 2001)	Choice of Russia
1997	Vladimir Plotnikov	Democratic Choice of Russia
2001	Viktor Volkov	Independent
2005	Constituency eliminated	
2009	Constituency eliminated	
2014	Mikhail Antontsev	United Russia
2019	Yelena Samyshina	Independent
2024	Oleg Artemyev	United Russia

== Election results ==
=== 2001 ===
Summary of the 16 December 2001 Moscow City Duma election in District 28
Candidate	Party	Votes	%
Viktor Volkov	Independent	13,230	20.55%
Mikhail Gromov	Independent	12,543	19.45%
Aleksandr Buzdakov	Independent	11,452	17.79%
Dmitry Shestakov	Independent	8,579	13.33%
Aleksandr Stepovoy	Union of Right Forces	4.174	6.48%
Vladimir Rudakov	Independent	691	1.07%
against all		10,865	16.88%
Total		65,268	100%

=== 2014 ===
Summary of the 14 September 2014 Moscow City Duma election in District 28
Candidate	Party	Votes	%
Mikhail Antontsev (incumbent) (Note: redistricted from District 10)	United Russia	14,280	45.29%
Marina Miroshina	A Just Russia	5,365	17.01%
Vladimir Kuimov	Communist Party	5,216	16.54%
Aleksey Yablokov	Yabloko	3,241	10.28%
Kirill Karov	Liberal Democratic Party	1,787	5.67%
Nikolay Zharmukhanov	Independent	604	1.92%
Total		31,533	100%

=== 2019 ===
Summary of the 8 September 2019 Moscow City Duma election in District 28
Candidate	Party	Votes	%
Yelena Samyshina	Independent	11,570	38.80%
Arkady Pavlinov	A Just Russia	7,716	25.88%
Konstantin Lazarev	Communist Party	6,992	23.45%
Sergey Yeliseyev	Liberal Democratic Party	2,377	7.97%
Total		29,819	100%

=== 2024 ===
Summary of the 6–8 September 2024 Moscow City Duma election in District 28
Candidate	Party	Votes	%
Oleg Artemyev (incumbent) (Note: redistricted from District 29)	United Russia	39,375	48.93%
Leonid Vorobyov	Communist Party	13,671	16.99%
Yegor Anisimov	Liberal Democratic Party	7,490	9.31%
Yekaterina Andrianova	Independent	6,643	8.25%
Dmitry Voronin	New People	5,927	7.36%
Yaroslavna Chalova	A Just Russia – For Truth	4,155	5.16%
Andrey Vasilchenkov	Communists of Russia	3,162	3.93%
Total		80,476	100%
