= Danilovsky (rural locality) =

Danilovsky (Russian: Дани́ловский; masculine), Danilovskaya (Дани́ловская; feminine), or Danilovskoye (Дани́ловское; neuter) is the name of several rural localities in Russia:

- Danilovskoye, Kostroma Oblast, a village in Podolskoye Settlement of Krasnoselsky District of Kostroma Oblast
- Danilovskoye, Kalininsky District, Tver Oblast, a village in Kalininsky District of Tver Oblast
- Danilovskoye, Molokovsky District, Tver Oblast, a village in Molokovsky District of Tver Oblast
- Danilovskoye, Staritsky District, Tver Oblast, a village in Staritsky District of Tver Oblast
- Danilovskoye, Vologda Oblast, a settlement in Nikiforovsky Selsoviet of Ustyuzhensky District of Vologda Oblast
- Danilovskaya, Lukhsky District, Ivanovo Oblast, a village in Lukhsky District of Ivanovo Oblast
- Danilovskaya, Pestyakovsky District, Ivanovo Oblast, a village in Pestyakovsky District of Ivanovo Oblast
- Danilovskaya, Kirov Oblast, a village in Zarechensky Rural Okrug of Podosinovsky District of Kirov Oblast
- Danilovskaya, Kharovsky District, Vologda Oblast, a village in Kumzersky Selsoviet of Kharovsky District of Vologda Oblast
- Danilovskaya, Kichmengsko-Gorodetsky District, Vologda Oblast, a village in Shongsky Selsoviet of Kichmengsko-Gorodetsky District of Vologda Oblast
- Danilovskaya, Nizhneslobodsky Selsoviet, Vozhegodsky District, Vologda Oblast, a village in Nizhneslobodsky Selsoviet of Vozhegodsky District of Vologda Oblast
- Danilovskaya, Yavengsky Selsoviet, Vozhegodsky District, Vologda Oblast, a village in Yavengsky Selsoviet of Vozhegodsky District of Vologda Oblast
