= Danilovsky =

Danilovsky (masculine), Danilovskaya (feminine), or Danilovskoye (neuter) may refer to:

== People ==
- Anna Danilovskaya, Kazakhstani pole vault record holder at the Asian Youth Athletics Championships
- Serhiy Danylovskyi (Sergey Danilovsky) (b. 1981), Ukrainian soccer player

== Places ==
- Danilovsky District, several districts in Russia
- Danilovsky (rural locality) (Danilovskaya, Danilovskoye), several rural localities in Russia
- Danilovsky Bridge, a bridge replaced with Avtozavodsky Bridge in Moscow, Russia
