= Mozhaysky (rural locality) =

Mozhaysky (Russian: Можайский; masculine), Mozhayskaya (Можайская; feminine), or Mozhayskoye (Можайское; neuter) is the name of several rural localities in Russia:

- Mozhayskoye, Belgorod Oblast, a selo in Novooskolsky District of Belgorod Oblast
- Mozhayskoye, Vologda Oblast, a settlement in Spassky Selsoviet of Vologodsky District of Vologda Oblast
- Mozhayskoye, Voronezh Oblast, a selo in Mozhayskoye Rural Settlement of Kashirsky District of Voronezh Oblast
