= Moscow City Duma District 44 =

Moscow City Duma electoral constituency

- Moscow City Duma constituency
- Deputy: Aleksandr Davankov; New People
- Administrative Okrug: Central
- Districts: Khamovniki, Tagansky, Yakimanka, Zamoskvorechye
- Voters: 170,352 (2024)

Moscow City Duma District 44 is one of 45 constituencies in Moscow City Duma. Currently the district covers southern half of Central Moscow.

The district has been represented since 2024 by New People deputy Aleksandr Davankov, a businessman and party deputy chairman, who succeeded two-term Yabloko incumbent Sergey Mitrokhin from District 43 after Mitrokhin failed to collect enough signatures to qualify.

== Boundaries ==
District boundaries from 2014 to 2024

2014–2024: Tagansky, Tverskoy, Yakimanka, Zamoskvorechye
The district was created prior to the 2014 election, after Moscow City Duma had been expanded from 35 to 45 seats. It covers parts of Central Moscow.

2024–present: Khamovniki, Tagansky, Yakimanka, Zamoskvorechye
After the 2023–24 Moscow redistricting the district covers the entirety of southern Central Moscow, gaining Khamovniki from District 43 and ceding Tverskoy District to District 45.

== Members elected ==
Election	Member	Party
2014	Yelena Shuvalova	Communist Party
2019	Yelena Shuvalova	Communist Party
2024	Aleksandr Davankov	New People

== Election results ==
=== 2014 ===
Summary of the 14 September 2014 Moscow City Duma election in District 44
Candidate	Party	Votes	%
Yelena Shuvalova	Communist Party	11,845	39.16%
Ilya Sviridov	A Just Russia	10,494	34.70%
Aleksandr Gnezdilov	Yabloko	4,876	16.12%
Konstantin Ponomaryov	Liberal Democratic Party	2,036	6.73%
Total		30,245	100%

=== 2019 ===
Summary of the 8 September 2019 Moscow City Duma election in District 44
Candidate	Party	Votes	%
Yelena Shuvalova (incumbent)	Communist Party	16,710	44.99%
Ilya Sviridov	Independent	15,738	42.37%
Nadezhda Shalimova	Independent	1,793	4.83%
Yekaterina Nechayeva	Liberal Democratic Party	1,714	4.61%
Total		37,140	100%

=== 2024 ===
Summary of the 6–8 September 2024 Moscow City Duma election in District 44
Candidate	Party	Votes	%
Aleksandr Davankov	New People	17,884	30.88%
Yelena Samyshina	United Russia	14,895	25.72%
Ilya Sviridov	A Just Russia – For Truth	9,074	15.67%
Andrey Voronkov	Communist Party	8,269	14.28%
Yevgeny Golovin	Liberal Democratic Party	4,823	8.33%
Vitaly Semenenko	Independent	2,922	5.05%
Total		57,908	100%
