= Moscow City Duma District 45 =

Moscow City Duma electoral constituency

- Moscow City Duma constituency
- Deputy: Maksim Dzhetygenov; United Russia
- Administrative Okrug: Central
- Districts: Arbat, Basmanny, Krasnoselsky, Meshchansky, Tverskoy
- Voters: 176,916 (2024)

Moscow City Duma District 45 is one of 45 constituencies in Moscow City Duma. Currently the district covers northern half of Central Moscow. Kremlin, Government of Moscow and Moscow City Duma are located within district's boundaries.

The district has been represented since 2024 by United Russia deputy Maksim Dzhetygenov, an emergency rescue activist, who defeated one-term incumbent and A Just Russia – For Truth faction leader Magomet Yandiev.

== Boundaries ==
District boundaries from 2014 to 2024

2014–2024: Basmanny, Krasnoselsky, Meshchansky, Sokolniki
The district was created prior to the 2014 election, after Moscow City Duma had been expanded from 35 to 45 seats. It covers eastern part of Central Moscow as well as Sokolniki in Eastern Moscow.

2024–present: Arbat, Basmanny, Krasnoselsky, Meshchansky, Tverskoy
During the 2023–24 Moscow redistricting the district was pushed westwards gaining Tverskoy District from District 44 and Arbat from District 43, while losing Sokolniki. In this configuration the district is contained entirely within Central Moscow.

== Members elected ==
Election	Member	Party
2014	Yaroslav Kuzminov	Independent
2019	Magomet Yandiev	A Just Russia
2024	Maksim Dzhetygenov	United Russia

== Election results ==
=== 2014 ===
Summary of the 14 September 2014 Moscow City Duma election in District 45
Candidate	Party	Votes	%
Yaroslav Kuzminov	Independent	12,860	40.99%
Yelena Fomicheva	Communist Party	7,347	23.42%
Nikolay Kavkazsky	Yabloko	4,010	12.78%
Kristina Simonyan	A Just Russia	3,527	11.24%
Anton Umnikov	Liberal Democratic Party	1,234	3.93%
Anton Komendantov	Independent	783	2.50%
Barbara Babich	Independent	702	2.24%
Total		31,373	100%

=== 2019 ===
Summary of the 8 September 2019 Moscow City Duma election in District 45
Candidate	Party	Votes	%
Magomet Yandiev	A Just Russia	12,942	38.09%
Valeria Kasamara	Independent	11,014	32.42%
Yevgeny Turushev	Liberal Democratic Party	4,124	12.14%
Mikhail Konev	Independent	3,365	9.90%
Total		33,977	100%

=== 2024 ===
Summary of the 6–8 September 2024 Moscow City Duma election in District 45
Candidate	Party	Votes	%
Maksim Dzhetygenov	United Russia	24,384	40.56%
Lesya Nechiporuk	New People	9,141	15.20%
Roman Krastelev	Liberal Democratic Party	8,953	14.89%
Kirill Okhapkin	Communist Party	7,734	12.86%
Magomet Yandiev (incumbent)	A Just Russia – For Truth	6,078	10.11%
Nikita Ostrankov	Communists of Russia	3,541	5.89%
Total		60,119	100%
