= Moscow City Duma District 43 =

Moscow City Duma electoral constituency

- Moscow City Duma constituency
- Deputy: Svetlana Akulova; United Russia
- Administrative Okrug: Central, North-Western
- Districts: Presnensky, Khoroshyovo-Mnyovniki
- Voters: 188,046 (2024)

Moscow City Duma District 43 is one of 45 constituencies in Moscow City Duma. Currently the district covers parts of Central and North-Western Moscow. Government of Russia is located within district's boundaries.

The district has been represented since 2024 by United Russia deputy Svetlana Akulova, a Moscow Zoo director, who succeeded retiring one-term My Moscow incumbent Roman Babayan after Babayan was redistricted there from District 5.

== Boundaries ==
District boundaries from 2014 to 2024

2014–2024: Arbat, Khamovniki, Presnensky
The district was created prior to the 2014 election, after Moscow City Duma had been expanded from 35 to 45 seats. It covers western parts of Central Moscow.

2024–present: Presnensky, Khoroshyovo-Mnyovniki
During the 2023–24 Moscow redistricting the district was completely overhauled, retaining only Presnensky District from its old configuration, while Arbat was moved into District 45 and Khamovniki – to District 44. The new District 43 also took Khoroshyovo-Mnyovniki in North-Western Moscow from the old District 5.

== Members elected ==
Election	Member	Party
2014	Vera Shastina	United Russia
2019	Sergey Mitrokhin	Yabloko
2024	Svetlana Akulova	United Russia

== Election results ==
=== 2014 ===
Summary of the 14 September 2014 Moscow City Duma election in District 43
Candidate	Party	Votes	%
Vera Shastina	United Russia	8,942	28.44%
Leonid Yarmolnik	Civic Platform	8,626	27.43%
Tatyana Denisenko	Communist Party	6,624	21.07%
Sergey Ivanenko	Yabloko	3,566	11.34%
Arina Iksanova	A Just Russia	1,962	6.24%
Yury Kravchenko	Liberal Democratic Party	959	3.05%
Total		31,445	100%

=== 2019 ===
Summary of the 8 September 2019 Moscow City Duma election in District 43
Candidate	Party	Votes	%
Sergey Mitrokhin	Yabloko	16,120	44.70%
Dmitry Koshlakov-Krestovsky	Liberal Democratic Party	7,231	20.05%
Roman Klimentyev	Communist Party	6,529	18.11%
Yevgeny Borovik	A Just Russia	4,952	13.73%
Total		36,059	100%

=== 2024 ===
Summary of the 6–8 September 2024 Moscow City Duma election in District 43
Candidate	Party	Votes	%
Svetlana Akulova	United Russia	34,997	54.09%
Aleksandr Ishchenko	Communist Party	9,982	15.43%
Sergey Chvyrov	New People	5,767	8.91%
Dmitry Zakharov	Independent	5,476	8.46%
Yury Zagrebnoy	A Just Russia – For Truth	4,502	6.96%
Anna Sevastyanova	Liberal Democratic Party	3,909	6.04%
Total		64,703	100%
