= MATHC =

Coordinates: 55.7333°N 37.55°E

Moscow State Institute for Tourism Industry n. a. Yuri Senkevich
- Московский Государственный Институт Индустрии Туризма имени Ю.А.Сенкевича
- Type: Public
- Established: 1966
- Location: Moscow, Russia
- Website: http://en.mgiit.ru/

MSITI (Russian: МГИИТ) - "Moscow State Institute for Tourism Industry n. a. Yuri Senkevich" (under the government of Moscow).

MSITI is the biggest academy for tourism in Moscow, Russia. The Academy was founded in 1966 to educate baccalaureates and specialists in the field of tourism and economists-managers.

== History ==
Created on September 30, 1966 as the Higher Courses on the training and retraining of specialists related to serving foreign tourists. In October 1975, the Higher Courses and the Problem Research Laboratory for the development of sectoral rules for receiving and servicing foreign tourists and Soviet citizens in the USSR in the hotel and tourist complex were transformed into the Institute for Advanced Studies of Senior Managers and Specialists of the USSR Glavintourist. In the same year, on the eve of the 1980 Olympic Games, training sessions for bartenders were held annually at the institute with the participation of specialists from the United States, through which more than 500 people passed.

== Faculties ==
- Faculty of social-cultural service and tourism, economy and management
- Faculty of foreign languages
- Faculty of distance education
- Faculty of additional education
- Faculty of secondary professional education

== Sources ==
- Popov, Alexey Dmitrievich (2014). "Зачем нам этот скипидар напополам с лимонадом?": Кулинарные секреты Олимпиады-80 ["Why do we need this turpentine and lemonade?": Culinary secrets of the Olympics-80]. Родина (Motherland) (in Russian) (12): 147–149. (copy)
