= Mozhayskoye, Vologda Oblast =

Mozhayskoye Можайское
- Settlement
- Location within Vologda Oblast Location within Russia
- Coordinates: 59°07′N 39°47′E
- Country: Russia
- Region: Vologda Oblast
- District: Vologodsky District
- Time zone: UTC+3:00

Mozhayskoye (Russian: Можайское) is a rural locality (a settlement) in Spasskoye Rural Settlement, Vologodsky District, Vologda Oblast, Russia. The population was 763 as of 2002. There are 19 streets.

== Geography ==
Mozhayskoye is located 13 km southwest of Vologda (the district's administrative centre) by road. Kotelnikovo is the nearest rural locality.
