= Elena Nikolaeva (politician) =

Russian politician (born 1969)

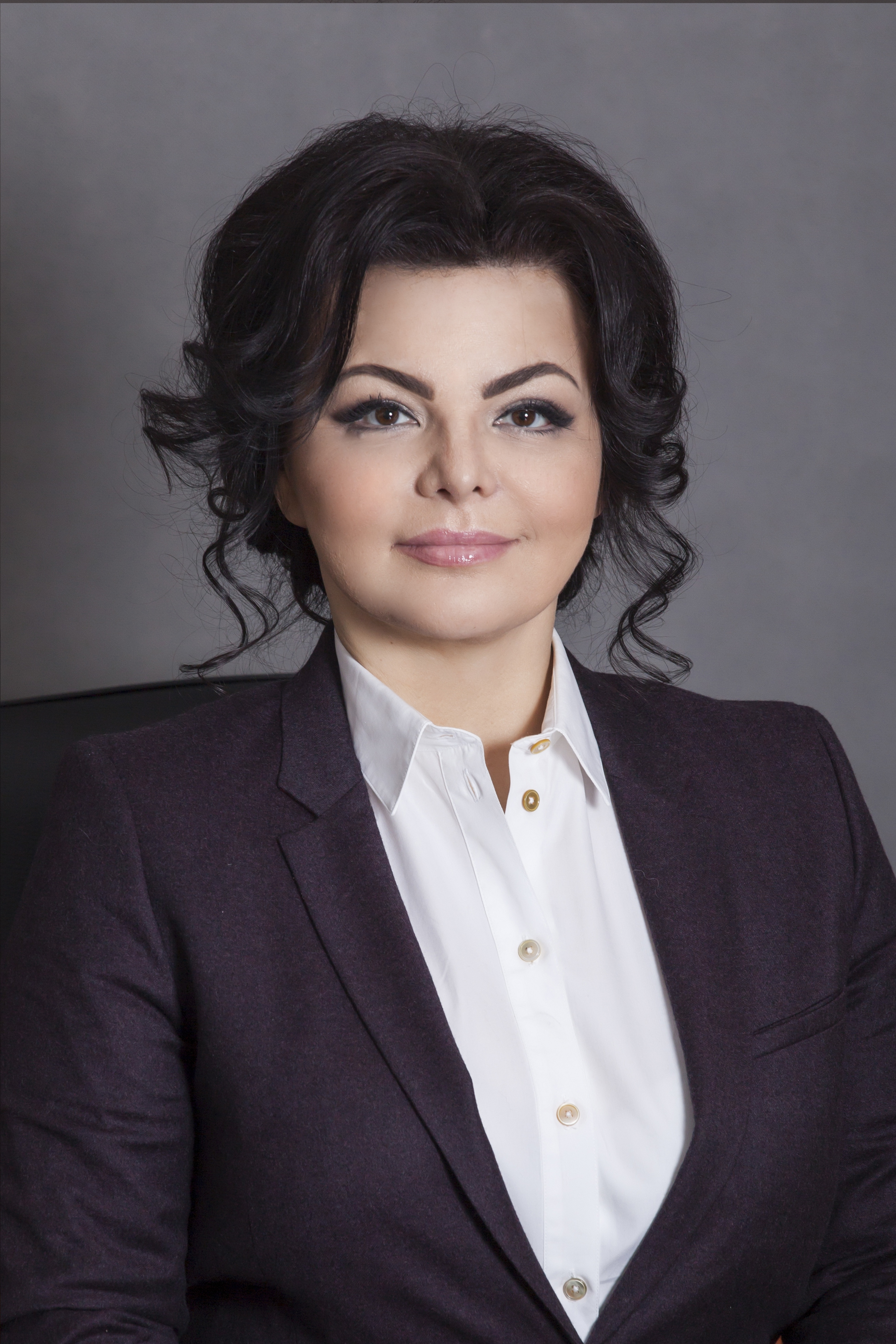
- Elena Nikolaeva
- Born: 22 November 1969 (age 56); Dolgoprudny, Soviet Union
- Occupations: politician, businesswoman

Elena Leonidovna Nikolaeva (Russian: Елена Леонидовна Николаева, born 22 November 1969 in Dolgoprudny) is a Russian politician and businesswoman. She graduated from the Moscow Institute of Physics and Technology in 1993 and obtained the degree of Candidate of Sciences from the Lomonosov University in 2011. She has been a member of the State Duma of the Russian Federation since 2011.
