= Danilovskaya, Nizhneslobodsky Selsoviet, Vozhegodsky District, Vologda Oblast =

Danilovskaya Даниловская
- Village
- Location within Vologda Oblast Location within Russia
- Coordinates: 60°29′N 41°03′E
- Country: Russia
- Region: Vologda Oblast
- District: Vozhegodsky District
- Time zone: UTC+3:00

Danilovskaya (Russian: Даниловская) is a rural locality (a village) in Nizhneslobodskoye Rural Settlement, Vozhegodsky District, Vologda Oblast, Russia. The population was 56 as of 2002.

== Geography ==
Danilovskaya is located 53 km east of Vozhega (the district's administrative centre) by road. Blinovskaya is the nearest rural locality.
