= Kiyevsky, Moscow =

Kiyevsky Киевский
- Work settlement
- Location within Moscow Location within Russia
- Coordinates: 55°25′21″N 36°51′16″E
- Country: Russia
- Region: Moscow
- District: Troitsky Administrative Okrug
- Time zone: UTC+3:00

Kiyevsky (Russian: Киевский) is an urban locality (an urban-type settlement) in Troitsky Administrative Okrug of the federal city of Moscow, Russia. Population: 8,095 (2010 census); 8,256 (2002 census); 7,728 (1989 Soviet census).
