= Yaroslavsky District =

Location of Moscow in Russia

Location of Yaroslavl Oblast in Russia

Yaroslavsky District is the name of several administrative and municipal districts in Russia:

- Yaroslavsky District, Moscow, a district in North-Eastern Administrative Okrug of Moscow
- Yaroslavsky District, Yaroslavl Oblast, an administrative and municipal district of Yaroslavl Oblast

== See also ==
- Yaroslavsky (disambiguation)
