= Alexey Gavrilov =

Russian actor (born 1983)

- Алексей Гаврилов
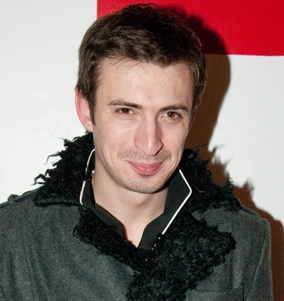
- Alexey Gavrilov at the premiere of the film in March 2011.
- Born: Alexey Anatolyevich Gavrilov; August 6, 1983 (age 43); Magnitogorsk, RSFSR, USSR
- Occupations: Actor; producer; media manager
- Years active: 2004–present

Alexey Anatolyevich Gavrilov (Russian: Алексей Анатольевич Гаврилов; born August 6, 1983) is a Russian actor, producer, became very popular in 2008 in the series Univer. General Director of the magazine "Russian Pioneer" (since 2017).

== Early life and career ==
Alexey Gavrilov was born in Magnitogorsk, Russian SFSR, Soviet Union. In a military family. In 1994 he moved to Moscow.

In 2007 he graduated from the All-Russian State University of Cinematography named after S. A. Gerasimov (Alexey Batalov's workshop).

2007 the second director of the film "Closed spaces" 2007 linear producer of the reality show "Call" SOXO pro for the channel STS. Since 2017 the general director of the magazine "Russian pioneer".

== Filmography ==
- My Love
- Travelling with Pets
- Univer
- SashaTanya
