= Society.Future =

Society.Future Общество.Будущее
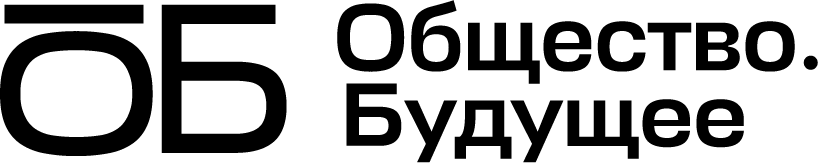
- Abbreviation: OB
- Leader: Pyotr Tikhonov
- Founder: Roman Yuneman; Danil Makhnitsky
- Founded: 11 November 2020
- Ideology: Russian nationalism National democracy Classical liberalism Symmetric federalism
- Political position: Centre-right to right-wing

Party flag
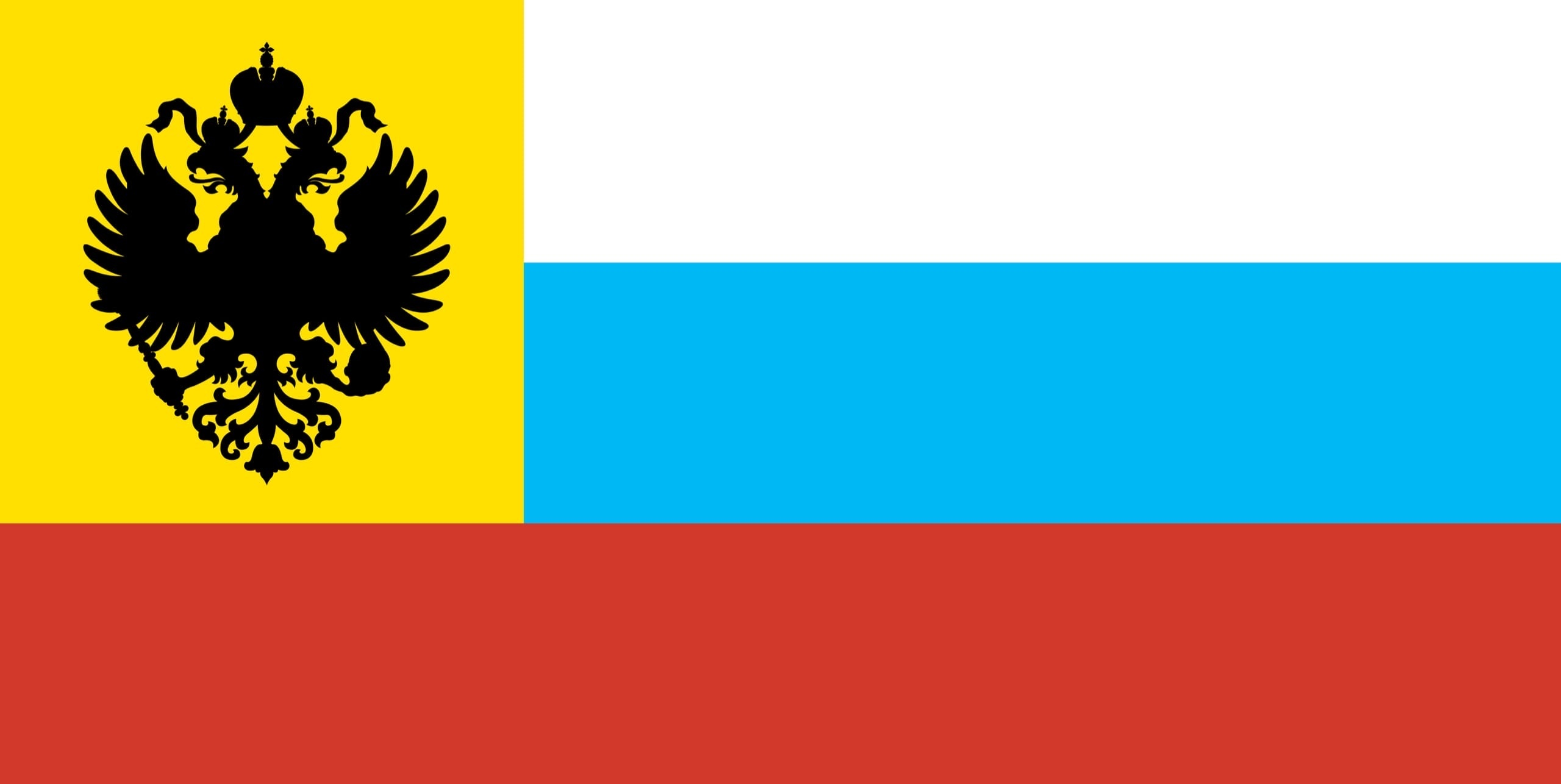

Website
- общество-будущее.рф

Society.Future (Russian: Общество.Будущее, romanized: Obshchestvo.Budushcheye ; OB) is a Russian national-democratic political movement founded by public figure Roman Yuneman on 11 November 2020. According to Yuneman, the Society.Future movement positions itself as center-right and will try to occupy the niche of constructive opposition.

Yuneman's followers are in favor of "Russian" Russia, economic and constitutional reforms, as well as the abolition of the use of electronic voting.

The Society.Future defines itself as a "third force": it is in opposition to the current government, but does not agree with the majority of opposition leaders on a number of fundamental ideological issues, including the dispute over the ownership of Crimea.

== History ==
In January 2020, Roman Yuneman established an analytical center for the preparation of projects for socio-political reforms "Society.Future". On 24 June 2020, at the presentation of his own version of the Constitution of Russia from Society.Future, Roman Yuneman announced the transformation of the thought factory into a political movement.

On 11 November 2020, the participants of the movement, led by Roman Yuneman, gathered at the Grafskaya Pier of Sevastopol to establish the "Society. Future", coinciding with the centenary of the "Russian Exodus".

In 2021, the founder of the movement, Roman Yuneman, became a nominee in the Forbes rating of "30 Most Promising Russians Under 30" in the "Social Practices" category.

Roman Yuneman, the founder of Society.Future, was not allowed to participate in the 2021 Russian legislative election in the Chertanovo constituency. After that, the movement redirected its forces to the New Moscow constituency to support the candidate from the New People party, a member of the Society.Future, Danil Makhnitsky.

In early 2022, the movement was accused of collaborating with the far-right ultra-nationalist book publishing house Black Hundred.

Members of the Society.Future movement, despite their opposition to the authorities, supported the accession of the Donetsk People's Republic and Luhansk People's Republic to Russia.

The movement participated in the 2022 Moscow municipal elections.

=== Leaders ===
No.	Portrait	Chairmen	Took office	Left office
1		Roman Yuneman (b. 1995)	24 June 2020	2021
2		Danil Makhnitsky (b. 1995)	2021	2022
3		Roman Yuneman (b. 1995)	2022	13 November 2024
1		Pyotr Tikhonov (b. 1997)	13 November 2024	

== Ideology ==
From the presentation of the movement it followed that the movement stands for the protection of basic human rights and freedoms, the creation of "real democratic institutions" and the free market. At the same time, its founders consider it necessary to “restore the historical continuity” of Russia and change the migration policy, and also emphasize that “Crimea is Russia.” And in the political memorandum of the organization it is said that the most important task of the state should be "protection of Russians and Russian culture" in the broadest sense.
