= Danilovsky District =

Location of Moscow in Russia

Location of Volgograd Oblast in Russia

Location of Yaroslavl Oblast in Russia

Danilovsky District is the name of several administrative and municipal districts in Russia. The districts' name generally derives from or is related to the male first name Danil.

- Danilovsky District, Moscow, a district in Southern Administrative Okrug of Moscow
- Danilovsky District, Volgograd Oblast, an administrative and municipal district of Volgograd Oblast
- Danilovsky District, Yaroslavl Oblast, an administrative and municipal district of Yaroslavl Oblast

== See also ==
- Danilovsky (disambiguation)
