= Egor Anisimov =

Russian politician

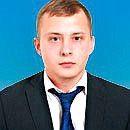

Member of the State Duma from Kaliningrad Oblast
- In office 23 October 2013 – 5 October 2016

Member of the Kaliningrad Oblast Duma
- Incumbent
- Assumed office September 18, 2016

Personal details
- Born: Egor Igorevich Anisimov; August 31, 1987 (age 39) Kaliningrad, Kaliningrad Oblast, Russian SFSR, Soviet Union
- Citizenship: Russian Federation
- Party: Liberal Democratic Party of Russia
- Education: Moscow International University (2009)
- Occupation: Politician

Egor Igorevich Anisimov (Russian: Его́р И́горевич Ани́симов; born 31 August 1987, Kaliningrad) is a Russian politician of the Liberal Democratic Party of Russia. He was a member of the State Duma in the 6th convocation, and is currently a deputy of the Kaliningrad Oblast Duma.

== Biography ==
Born on 31 August 1987 in Kaliningrad. In 2013, he became a member of the State Duma, having accepted the mandate of the deceased in the court of auditors Maksim Rokhmistrov. He was also a member of the State Duma Committee on Education.

== Bills ==
Anisimov introduced a patriotic bill No. 763042-6 "On measures to counter sanctions of foreign States in the field of culture and on amendments to the Russian Code of administrative offences." Under the bill, the Duma is considering banning all films from all countries that have imposed sanctions against the Russian Federation. The first article of the bill formulates a ban on the rental and showing of foreign films, the second article introduces administrative liability of legal entities and physical persons for violation of this prohibition. The suggested fine for individuals is 2,500 rubles (US$34), and releasing companies could face a fine of 40 to 50 thousand rubles (up to US$679).

== Family ==
He is married and has a son.
