= Mozhaysky District =

Location of Moscow in Russia

Location of Moscow Oblast in Russia

Mozhaysky District is the name of several administrative and municipal districts in Russia:

- Mozhaysky District, Moscow, a district in Western Administrative Okrug of the federal city of Moscow
- Mozhaysky District, Moscow Oblast, an administrative and municipal district of Moscow Oblast

== See also ==
- Mozhaysky (disambiguation)
