= Nagorny District =

Nagorny District Нагорный район (Russian)
- District
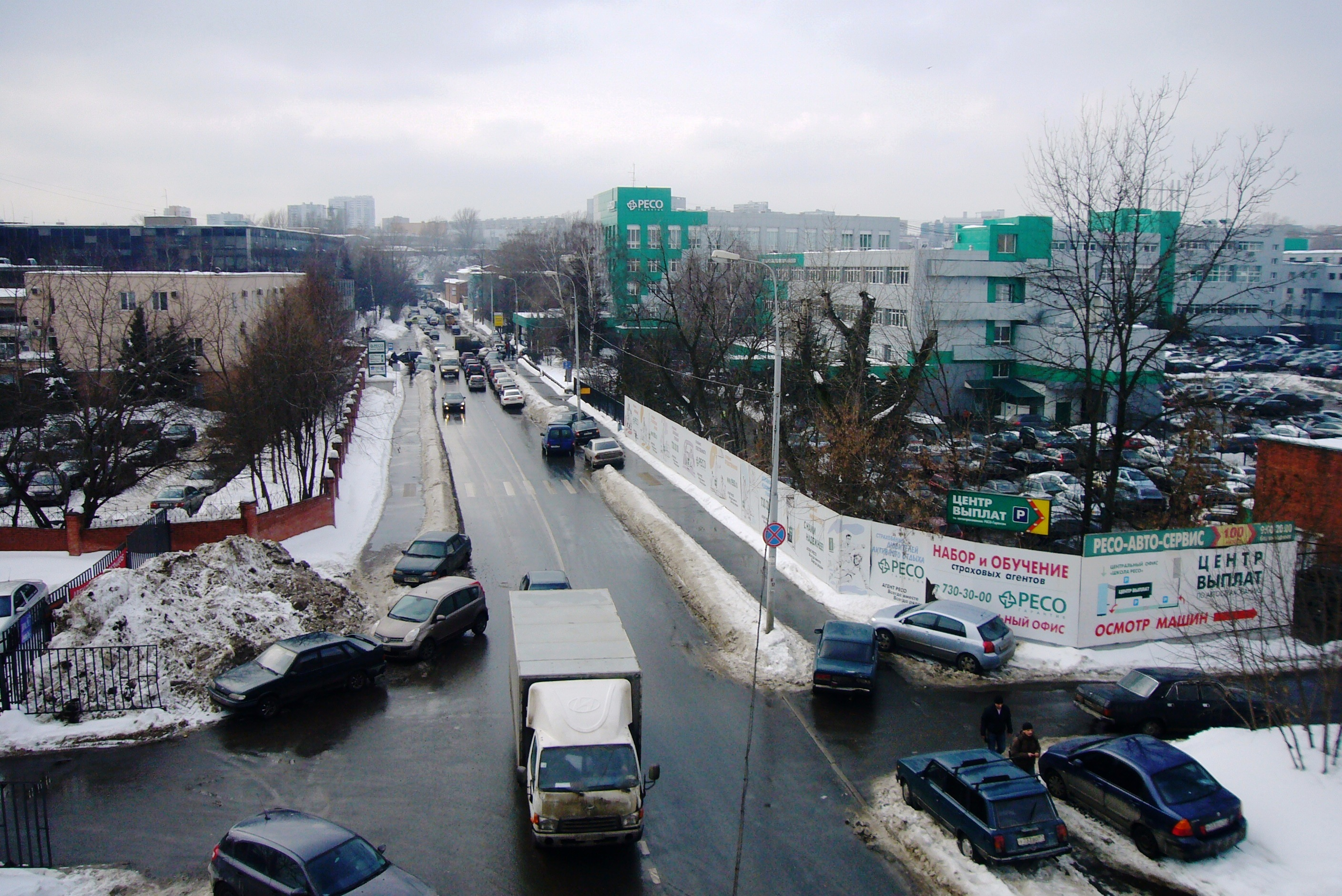
- Nagorny Passage, Nagorny District

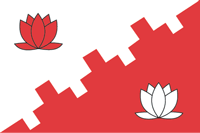
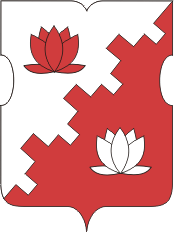
- Flag Coat of arms
- Location of Nagorny District on the map of Moscow
- Coordinates: 55°40′00″N 37°37′00″E
- Country: Russia
- Federal subject: Moscow
- Time zone: UTC+
- OKTMO ID: 45920000
- Website: http://nagorny.mos.ru/

Nagorny District (Russian: Наго́рный райо́н) is an administrative district (raion) of Southern Administrative Okrug, and one of the 125 raions of Moscow, Russia. The area of the district is 5.42 square kilometers (2.09 sq mi).

== See also ==
- Administrative divisions of Moscow
