= Chertanovo Tsentralnoye District =

Chertanovo Tsentralnoye District Чертаново Центральное (Russian)
- District
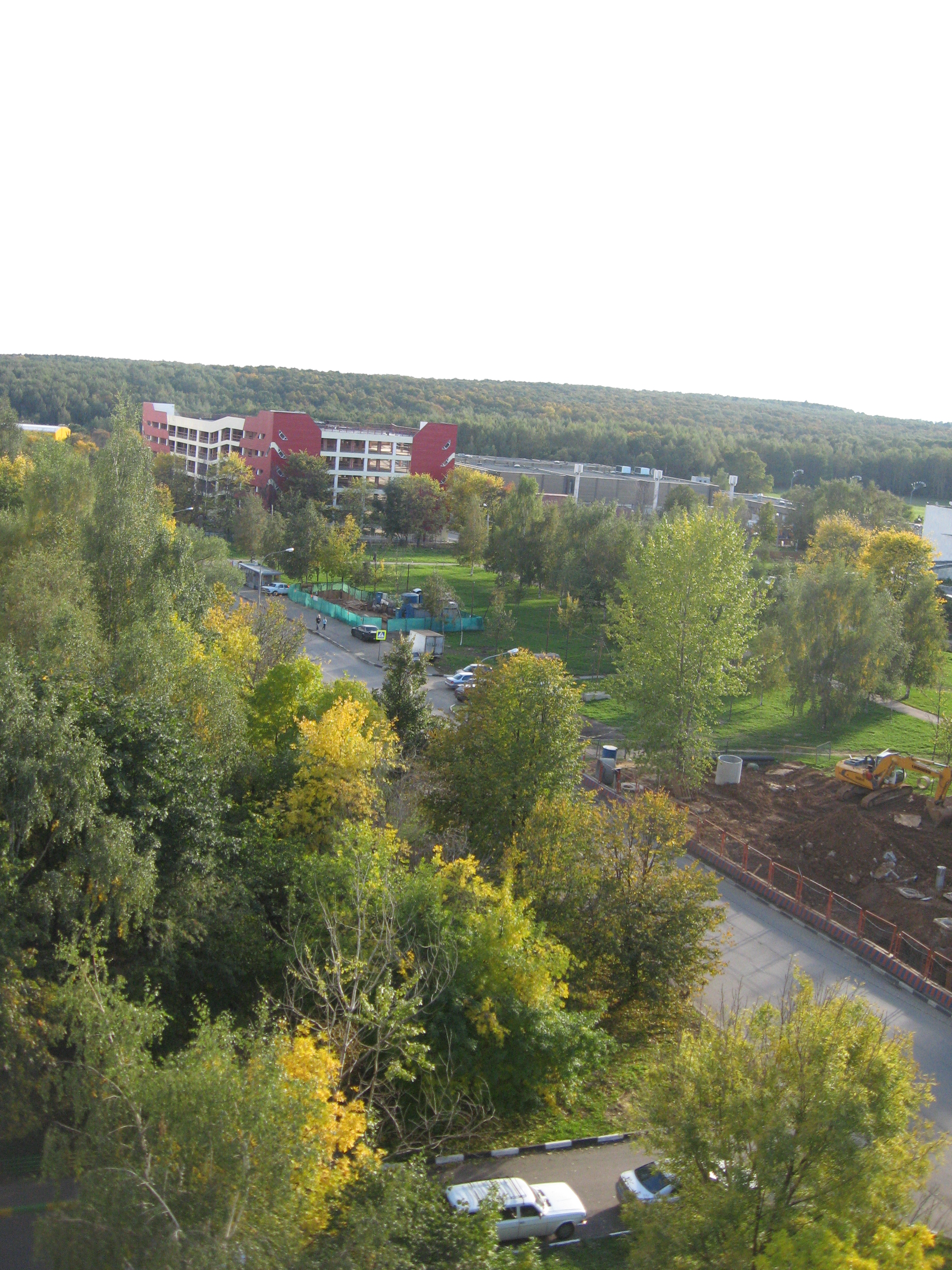
- Krasnogo Mayaka street, Chertanovo Tsentralnoye District

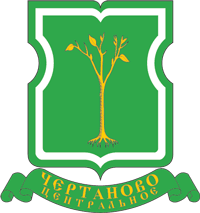
- Flag Coat of arms
- Location of Chertanovo Tsentralnoye District on the map of Moscow
- Coordinates: 55°36′49″N 37°35′43″E
- Country: Russia
- Federal subject: Moscow
- Time zone: UTC+
- OKTMO ID: 45925000
- Website: http://chertanovocentr.mos.ru/

Chertanovo Tsentralnoye District (Russian: район Чертаново Центральное) is an administrative district (raion) of Southern Administrative Okrug, and one of the 125 raions of Moscow, Russia.

== See also ==
- Administrative divisions of Moscow
