= Solntsevo constituency =

Russian legislative constituency

Solntsevo single-member constituency
- Constituency of the Russian State Duma
- Deputy: Yevgeny Andriyenko; United Russia
- Federal subject: Moscow
- Districts: Western AO (Dorogomilovo, Novo-Peredelkino, Prospekt Vernadskogo, Ramenki, Solntsevo, Troparyovo-Nikulino)
- Voters: 491,853 (2026)

The Solntsevo constituency (No.210 (Note: Universitetsky constituency No.201 in 1993–2007)) is a Russian legislative constituency in Moscow. The constituency covers southern part of Western Administrative Okrug.

The constituency has been represented since 2026 by United Russia deputy Yevgeny Andriyenko, former member of the city election commission and city government official.

== Boundaries ==
Constituency boundaries from 1993 to 2007

1993–2003 Universitetsky constituency: South-Western Administrative Okrug (Gagarinsky District, Lomonosovsky District, Obruchevsky District), Western Administrative Okrug (Matveyevskoye District, (Note: merged into Ochakovo-Matveyevskoye District in 1997) Mosfilmovsky District, (Note: merged with Ramenki District in 1997) Novo-Peredelkino District, Prospekt Vernadskogo District, Ramenki District, Solntsevo District, Troparyovo-Nikulino District, Vnukovo District)
The constituency covered southern part of Western Administrative Okrug and north-western part of South-Western Administrative Okrug as well as Vnukovo District exclave.

2003–2007 Universitetsky constituency: South-Western Administrative Okrug (Gagarinsky District, Lomonosovsky District, Obruchevsky District), Western Administrative Okrug (Novo-Peredelkino District, Prospekt Vernadskogo District, Ramenki District, Solntsevo District, Troparyovo-Nikulino District, Vnukovo District)
After the 2003 redistricting the constituency was slightly altered, losing the territory of former Matveyevskoye District (merged into Ochakovo-Matveyevskoye District in 1997) to Kuntsevo constituency.

2026–present: Western Administrative Okrug (Dorogomilovo District, Novo-Peredelkino District, Ochakovo-Matveyevskoye District, Prospekt Vernadskogo District, Ramenki District, Solntsevo District, Troparyovo-Nikulino District)
After the 2025 redistricting Moscow gained 16th district, which prompted the reinstating of the seat under the name "Solntsevo constituency". The constituency was created in southern Western Administrative Okrug from parts of Kuntsevo (inner part) and New Moscow (outer part) constituencies.

== Members elected ==
Election	Member	Party
1993	Aleksandr Braginsky	Russian Democratic Reform Movement
1995	Pavel Bunich	Independent
1999	Mikhail Zadornov (Note: in 2005 appointed as president of Guta-Bank)	Yabloko
2003	Mikhail Zadornov	Yabloko
2005	Stanislav Govorukhin	United Russia
2007	Proportional representation - no election by constituency	
2011	Proportional representation - no election by constituency	
2016	Constituency eliminated	
2021	Constituency eliminated	
2026	Yevgeny Andriyenko	United Russia

== Election results ==
=== 1993 ===
==== Declared candidates ====
- Mikhail Bagnyuk (Independent), nonprofit president
- Andrey Bogdanov (DPR), secretary of the party central committee
- Aleksandr Braginsky (RDDR), Deputy Premier of Moscow (1992–present)
- Aleksandr Chumakov (Independent), Institute of Philosophy, Russian Academy of Sciences leading researcher
- Sergei Grigoryants (Independent), journalist, human rights activist
- Boris Khangeldyyev (APR), former Member of Sverdlovsk City Council of Workers (1962–1966), professor of law
- Mikhail Kuznetsov (Independent), attorney, professor of civil law (previously ran as APR candidate)
- Aleksandr Lukin (Independent), former Member of Moscow City Council of People's Deputies (1990–1993), international relations specialist, son of ambassador Vladimir Lukin
- Eleonora Mitrofanova (LDPR), law firm director
- Yury Tavrovsky (BR–NI), journalist, RTR TV presenter
- Valery Vorobyov (CPRF), associate professor of logic
- Nikolay Vorontsov (Choice of Russia), former People's Deputy of Russia (1990–1993), former Minister of Natural Resources and Environment of the Soviet Union (1991)
- Pavel Zhukov (YaBL), unemployed

==== Results ====
Summary of the 12 December 1993 Russian legislative election in the Universitetsky constituency
Candidate	Party	Votes	%
Aleksandr Braginsky	Russian Democratic Reform Movement	50,901	21.90%
Aleksandr Lukin	Independent	24,295	10.45%
Nikolay Vorontsov	Choice of Russia	20,686	8.90%
Mikhail Kuznetsov	Independent	16,498	7.10%
Sergei Grigoryants	Independent	13,285	5.71%
Valery Vorobyov	Communist Party	13,092	5.63%
Pavel Zhukov	Yavlinsky–Boldyrev–Lukin	11,373	4.89%
Andrey Bogdanov	Democratic Party	9,157	3.94%
Eleonora Mitrofanova	Liberal Democratic Party	8,510	3.66%
Mikhail Bagnyuk	Independent	4,740	2.04%
Aleksandr Chumakov	Independent	3,745	1.61%
Yury Tavrovsky	Future of Russia–New Names	1,423	0.61%
Boris Khangeldyyev	Agrarian Party	772	0.33%
against all		41,020	17.65%
Total		232,462	100%

=== 1995 ===
==== Declared candidates ====
- Vladimir Aleksandrov (LDPR), INION leading researcher
- Nadezhda Belostotskaya (Independent), banker
- Grigory Berezkin (Independent), oil executive
- Pavel Bunich (Independent), Member of State Duma (1994–present)
- Yury Kochanov (Independent), Ministry of Social Protection of Russia consultant
- Yury Komramny (Independent), businessman
- Sergey Kostenko (Independent), physician
- Valery Lashkov (AAR), first secretary of the Embassy of Russia to Ukraine
- Aleksandr Lukin (Yabloko), former Member of Moscow City Council of People's Deputies (1990–1993), international relations specialist, son of State Duma member Vladimir Lukin, 1993 candidate for this seat
- Anatoly Medvedev (Independent), Union of Realists movement official
- Vadim Modenov (Independent), security executive
- Natalia Narochnitskaya (Zemsky Sobor), IMEMO leading researcher
- Viktor Shevelukha (CPRF), Member of State Duma (1994–present)
- Artyom Tarasov (Kedr), Member of State Duma (1994–present)
- Gennady Venglinsky (Independent), sports complex director
- Nikolay Vorontsov (DVR–OD), Member of State Duma (1994–present), 1993 candidate for this seat
- Valery Zhukov (Independent), First Deputy Suprefect of Prospekt Vernadskogo District

==== Declined ====
- Aleksandr Braginsky (Social Democrats), incumbent Member of State Duma (1994–present)

==== Results ====
Summary of the 17 December 1995 Russian legislative election in the Universitetsky constituency
Candidate	Party	Votes	%
Pavel Bunich	Independent	56,056	18.49%
Aleksandr Lukin	Yabloko	43,067	14.21%
Viktor Shevelukha	Communist Party	36,831	12.15%
Artyom Tarasov	Kedr	34,427	11.36%
Nikolay Vorontsov	Democratic Choice of Russia – United Democrats	28,627	9.44%
Grigory Berezkin	Independent	23,994	7.92%
Yury Kochanov	Independent	7,923	2.61%
Gennady Venglinsky	Independent	7,339	2.42%
Natalia Narochnitskaya	Zemsky Sobor	5,946	1.96%
Vadim Modenov	Independent	5,461	1.80%
Vladimir Aleksandrov	Liberal Democratic Party	4,645	1.53%
Anatoly Medvedev	Independent	3,740	1.23%
Sergey Kostenko	Independent	3,135	1.03%
Valery Zhukov	Independent	2,281	0.75%
Valery Lashkov	Russian Lawyers' Association	2,163	0.71%
Yury Kapralny	Independent	1,856	0.61%
Nadezhda Belostotskaya	Independent	1,372	0.45%
against all		28,513	9.41%
Total		303,099	100%

=== 1999 ===
==== Declared candidates ====
- Maria Arbatova (SPS), writer, playwright
- Darya Aslamova (Independent), journalist
- Pavel Bunich (NDR), incumbent Member of State Duma (1994–present), Chairman of the Duma Committee on Property, Privatization, and Economic Activity (1996–present)
- Aleksey Churkin (Independent), agriculture executive
- Aleksandr Ivanov (Independent), banker
- Vladimir Kishinets (Independent), homeowners' association chairman, futurologist
- Aleksandr Kuvayev (CPRF), Member of State Duma (1996–present)
- Leonid Olshansky (Independent), attorney
- Oleg Petrov (Independent), former Member of Moscow Kievsky District Council of People's Deputies (1990–1993), nonprofit president
- Vladimir Semago (Independent), Member of State Duma (1994–present), Chairman of the Duma Commission on Corruption (1997–present)
- Mikhail Zadornov (Yabloko), former First Deputy Prime Minister of Russia (1999), former Member of State Duma (1994–1997)

==== Results ====
Summary of the 19 December 1999 Russian legislative election in the Universitetsky constituency
Candidate	Party	Votes	%
Mikhail Zadornov	Yabloko	64,179	20.16%
Oleg Petrov	Independent	58,456	18.36%
Maria Arbatova	Union of Right Forces	47,052	14.78%
Aleksandr Kuvayev	Communist Party	39,863	12.52%
Leonid Olshansky	Independent	22,516	7.07%
Pavel Bunich (incumbent)	Our Home – Russia	19,289	6.06%
Vladimir Kishinets	Independent	9,178	2.88%
Vladimir Semago	Independent	4,733	1.49%
Darya Aslamova	Independent	4,659	1.46%
Aleksandr Ivanov	Independent	1,613	0.51%
Aleksey Churkin	Independent	1,049	0.33%
against all		37,739	11.85%
Total		318,367	100%

=== 2003 ===
==== Declared candidates ====
- Yelena Bogdanova (DPR), political strategist
- Vladimir Didenko (Independent), nonprofit vice president
- Yevgeny Gerasimov (United Russia), Member of Moscow City Duma (2001–present)
- Nikolay Gubenko (CPRF), Member of State Duma (1996–present), Chairman of the Duma Committee on Culture and Tourism (2000–present)
- Nikolay Khramov (Independent), coordinator of Transnational Radical Party in Russia
- Vyacheslav Lovtsov (Independent), pensioner
- Andrei Parshev (Independent), writer, Border Service colonel
- Svetlana Potapova (SDPR), chairwoman of the party regional office
- Svyatoslav Rybas (PVR-RPZh), writer
- Ruslan Sakiyev (RP), businessman
- Olga Skorogodskikh (Independent), leadership consultant
- Vladimir Sukhomlin (Independent), professor of computer science
- Mikhail Zadornov (Yabloko), incumbent Member of State Duma (1994–1997, 2000–present)

==== Did not file ====
- Aleksandr Dergunov (Independent), manager
- Dmitry Druzhinin (Independent), political scientist
- Igor Kotenkov (PME), pensioner
- Tatyana Okulskaya (LDPR), manager
- Mikhail Shamanov (Independent), tourism businessman
- Sergey Zakusilo (Independent), pensioner

==== Results ====
Summary of the 7 December 2003 Russian legislative election in the Universitetsky constituency
Candidate	Party	Votes	%
Mikhail Zadornov (incumbent)	Yabloko	70,232	26.55%
Yevgeny Gerasimov	United Russia	67,265	25.43%
Nikolay Gubenko	Communist Party	42,460	16.05%
Vladimir Sukhomlin	Independent	11,364	4.30%
Andrey Parshev	Independent	8,438	3.19%
Irina Bogdanova	Democratic Party	6,306	2.38%
Svyatoslav Rybas	Party of Russia's Rebirth-Russian Party of Life	2,252	0.85%
Ruslan Sakiyev	Development of Enterprise	1,965	0.74%
Olga Skorogodskikh	Independent	1,837	0.68%
Svetlana Potapova	Social Democratic Party	1,804	0.68%
Vyacheslav Lovtsov	Independent	1,263	0.48%
Vladimir Didenko	Independent	1,107	0.42%
Nikolay Khramov	Independent	1,095	0.41%
against all		42,614	16.11%
Total		265,577	100%

=== 2005 ===
==== Declared candidates ====
- Sergey Danilenko (Rodina), former Member of Central Election Commission (1999–2003)
- Stanislav Govorukhin (United Russia), former Member of State Duma (1994–2003), 2000 presidential candidate
- Raisa Babich (Independent), businesswoman
- Mikhail Dvornikov (Independent), billionaire real estate developer
- Dmitry Gudkov (Independent), press secretary of the NPRF, son of State Duma member Gennady Gudkov
- Anna Kameneva (Independent), aide to State Duma member
- Valery Kubarev (Independent), nonprofit chairman
- Vladimir Malakhov (Independent), businessman
- Stella Obodina (Independent), Member of Prospekt Vernadskogo District Municipal Assembly
- Viktor Shenderovich (Independent), writer, satirist
- Sergey Slabun (Independent), professor of economics
- Nikolay Zhdanov-Lutsenko (Independent), former Minister of Crimea for External Relations and Media (1994–1995), writer

==== Withdrawn candidates ====
- Maria Gaidar (Independent), daughter of former Prime Minister of Russia Yegor Gaidar

==== Failed to qualify ====
- Lilia Adarcheva (Independent), associate professor
- Aleksey Barbash (Independent), pensioner
- Vladimir Baryshenko (Independent), businessman, 2003 mayoral candidate
- Nikolay Danilenko (Independent), pensioner
- Yevgeny Dosayev (Independent), pensioner
- Andrey Cherepanov (Independent), banker
- Pavel Grishin (Independent), unemployed
- Rudolf Kagramanov (Independent), community activist, 1999 Leningrad Oblast gubernatorial candidate
- Valery Kamshilov (Dragan) (Independent), cossack ataman
- Vladimir Kaurov (Independent), unemployed
- Dmitry Kedrov (Independent), stage setter
- Mikhail Khodorkovsky (Independent), former billionaire businessman, convicted felon
- Igor Kirpichyov (Independent), sociologist, retired Russian Navy captain 3rd rank
- Natalya Koroleva (Independent), folk group leader
- Viktor Kosarev (Independent), pensioner
- Vladimir Kuvshinov (Independent), pensioner
- Gennady Ledenev (Independent), energy construction executive
- Vyacheslav Lomakin (Independent), electrician
- Vasily Mityukhlyayev (Independent), pensioner
- Vladimir Plyusnin (Independent), security guard
- Kirill Raykov (Independent), Member of Prospekt Vernadskogo District Municipal Assembly, lab head
- Yury Reva (Independent), pensioner
- Dionis Rostra (Independent), journalist
- Igor Rytchenko (Independent), insurance representative
- Aleksandr Savchuk (Independent), attorney
- Denis Solomkin (Independent), legal counsel
- Andrey Subbotin (Independent), INION leading researcher
- Vladimir Sukhomlin (Independent), professor of computer science, 2003 candidate for this seat
- Yelena Valetnyuk (Independent), speech therapist
- Viktor Yanulevich (Independent), nonprofit chairman
- Aleksandr Zaporozhets (Independent), banker

==== Results ====
Summary of the 4 December 2005 by-election in the Universitetsky constituency
Candidate	Party	Votes	%
Stanislav Govorukhin	United Russia	59,293	38.16%
Viktor Shenderovich	Independent	26,157	16.83%
Mikhail Dvornikov	Independent	11,882	7.64%
Sergey Danilenko	Rodina	10,780	6.93%
Stella Obodina	Independent	5,695	3.66%
Nikolay Zhdanov-Lutsenko	Independent	5,520	3.55%
Dmitry Gudkov	Independent	2,739	1.76%
Vladimir Malakhov	Independent	2,245	1.44%
Anna Kameneva	Independent	2,191	1.41%
Sergey Slabun	Independent	1,731	1.11%
Raisa Babich	Independent	1,274	0.82%
Valery Kubarev	Independent	746	0.48%
against all		19,900	12.81%
Total		155,343	100%

=== 2026 ===
==== Declared candidates ====
- Yevgeny Andriyenko (United Russia), Member of Moscow City Election Commission (2016–present)
- Vladimir Lobanov (CPCR), businessman
- Marizhat Ramazanova (Yabloko), aide to Yabloko party chairman Nikolay Rybakov
- Irina Rodkina (New People), Member of Troparyovo-Nikulino District Council of Deputies (2022–present), designer
- Konstantin Ryzhak (A Just Russia), community activist, son of former State Duma member Nikolay Ryzhak
- Boris Spirin (LDPR), Member of Ramenki District Council of Deputies (2022–present), nonprofit manager
- Igor Sukhanov (CPRF), party secretary
- Olga Zabaturina (The Greens), ecological activist

==== Declined ====
- Dmitry Golubyatnikov (Rodina), engineer (running in the Yaroslavl constituency)
- Ivan Pilyayev (United Russia), former Member of State Duma (2019–2021) (lost the primary)

==== Results ====
Summary of the 18-20 September 2026 Russian legislative election in the Solntsevo constituency
Candidate	Party	Votes	%
Yevgeny Andriyenko	United Russia	105,329	44.11%
Irina Rodkina	New People	31,484	13.18%
Igor Sukhanov	Communist Party	24,441	10.23%
Marizhat Ramazanova	Yabloko	22,597	9.46%
Boris Spirin	Liberal Democratic Party	19,586	8.20%
Konstantin Ryzhak	A Just Russia	15,339	6.42%
Vladimir Lobanov	Communists of Russia	9,919	4.15%
Olga Zabaturina	The Greens	9,236	3.87%
Total		238,808	100%
