= Kuntsevo constituency =

Russian legislative constituency

Kuntsevo single-member constituency
- Constituency of the Russian State Duma
- Deputy: Yevgeny Popov; United Russia
- Federal subject: Moscow
- Districts: North-Western Administrative Okrug (Strogino), Western AO (Fili-Davydkovo, Filyovsky Park, Krylatskoye, Kuntsevo, Mozhaysky)
- Voters: 458,574 (2026)

The Kuntsevo constituency (No.196 (Note: Western constituency No.193 in 1993-1995, No.193 in 1995-2007, No.197 in 2016–2026)) is a Russian legislative constituency in Moscow. The constituency covers northern parts of Western Moscow as well as Strogino in North-Western Moscow.

The constituency has been represented since 2021 by United Russia deputy Yevgeny Popov, TV presenter and journalist, who narrowly won the open seat, succeeding two-term United Russia incumbent Vyacheslav Lysakov.

== Boundaries ==
1993–1995 Western constituency: Western Administrative Okrug (Dorogomilovo District, Fili-Davydkovo District, Filyovsky Park District, Krylatskoye District, Kuntsevo District, Mozhaysky District, Ochakovo District)
The constituency covered northern half of Western Moscow.

1995–2003: North-Western Administrative Okrug (Strogino District), Western Administrative Okrug (Dorogomilovo District, Fili-Davydkovo District, Krylatskoye District, Kuntsevo District, Mozhaysky District, Ochakovo District)
After the 1995 the constituency was slightly altered, swapping Filyovsky Park District for Strogino District in North-Western Moscow with Tushino constituency.

2003–2007: Western Administrative Okrug (Dorogomilovo District, Fili-Davydkovo District, Filyovsky Park District, Krylatskoye District, Kuntsevo District, Mozhaysky District, Ochakovo-Matveyevskoye District)
The constituency was slightly changed following the 2003 redistricting, returning Strogino District to Tushino constituency for Filyovsky Park District as well as gaining the rest of Ochakovo-Matveyevskoye District from Universitetsky constituency.

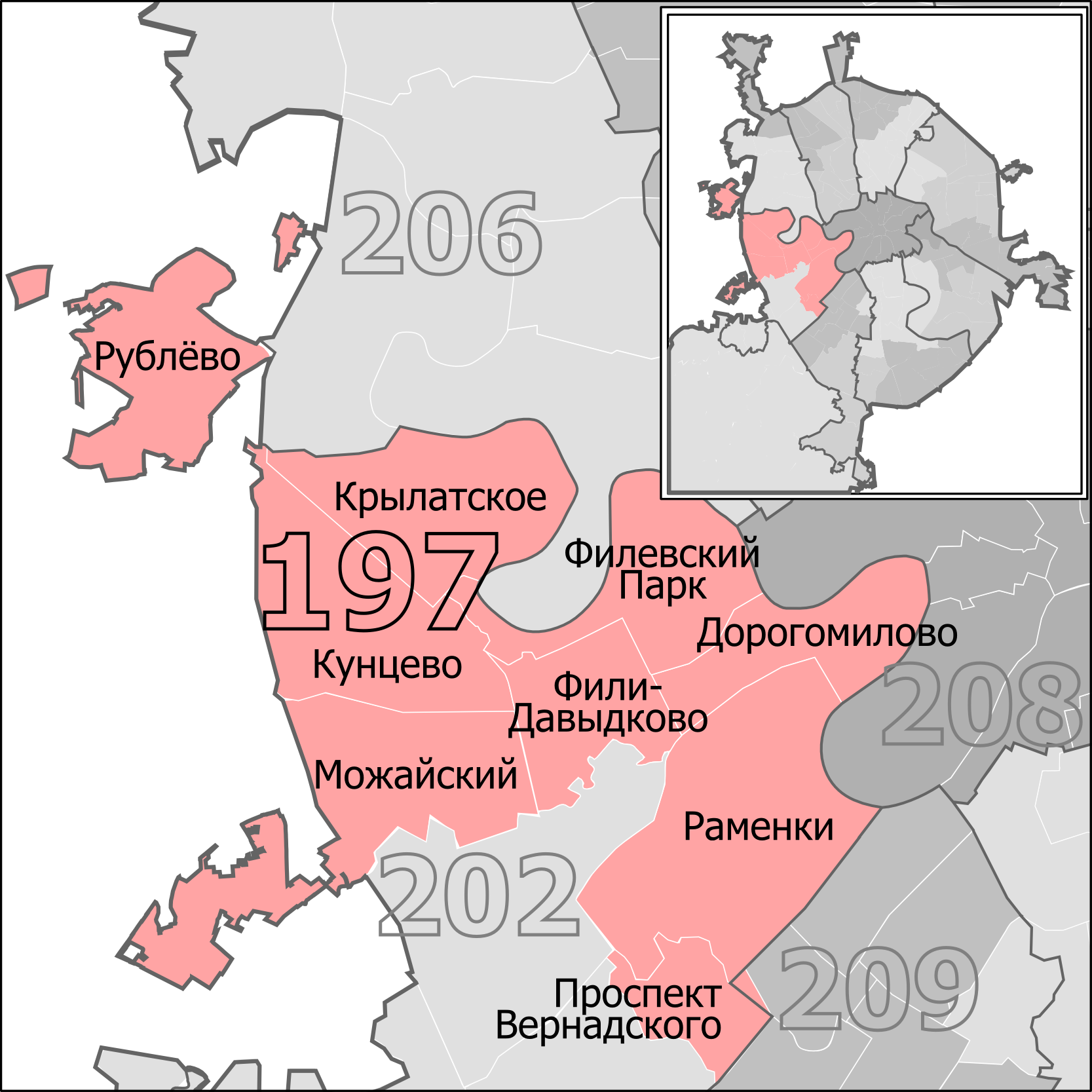
Constituency boundaries from 2016 to 2026

2016–2026: Western Administrative Okrug (Dorogomilovo District, Fili-Davydkovo District, Filyovsky Park District, Krylatskoye District, Kuntsevo District, Mozhaysky District, Prospekt Vernadskogo District, Ramenki District)
The constituency was re-created for the 2016 election and retained almost all of its former territory, losing Ochakovo-Matveyevskoye District to New Moscow constituency. This seat instead gained Ramenki District and Prospekt Vernadskogo District from the dissolved Universitetsky constituency.

2026–present: North-Western Administrative Okrug (Strogino District), Western Administrative Okrug (Fili-Davydkovo District, Filyovsky Park District, Krylatskoye District, Kuntsevo District, Mozhaysky District) Following the 2025 redistricting the constituency was significantly altered, losing Dorogomilovo District, Ramenki District and Prospekt Vernadskogo District to new Solntsevo constituency. This seat instead re-gained Strogino District from Tushino constituency.

== Members elected ==
Election	Member	Party
1993	Georgy Zadonsky	Choice of Russia
1995	Aleksey Golovkov (Note: in 1998 appointed as general director of Rosgosstrakh)	Independent
1999	Valery Grebennikov	Fatherland – All Russia
2003	Valery Grebennikov	United Russia
2007	Proportional representation - no election by constituency	
2011	Proportional representation - no election by constituency	
2016	Vyacheslav Lysakov	United Russia
2021	Yevgeny Popov	United Russia
2026	Yevgeny Popov	United Russia

== Election results ==
=== 1993 ===
Summary of the 12 December 1993 Russian legislative election in the Western constituency
Candidate	Party	Votes	%
Georgy Zadonsky	Choice of Russia	48,606	19.82%
Grigory Kovalenko	Independent	–	15.36%
Vyacheslav Koveshnikov	Yavlinsky–Boldyrev–Lukin	–	–
Sergey Komkov	Kedr	–	–
Andrey Nikitin	Independent	–	–
Vyacheslav Nikonov	Party of Russian Unity and Accord	–	–
Konstantin Panferov	Liberal Democratic Party	–	–
Yevgeny Spirin	Independent	–	–
Mikhail Suzdaltsev	Dignity and Charity	–	–
Vladimir Trofimov	Communist Party	–	–
Genrikh Tsvelikhovskiy	Russian Democratic Reform Movement	–	–
Total		245,249	100%

=== 1995 ===
Summary of the 17 December 1995 Russian legislative election in the Kuntsevo constituency
Candidate	Party	Votes	%
Aleksey Golovkov	Independent	74,556	24.67%
Georgy Zadonsky (incumbent)	Democratic Choice of Russia – United Democrats	46,809	15.49%
Viktor Uchitel	Yabloko	41,587	13.76%
Sergey Shuvalov	Communist Party	33,525	11.09%
Oleg Petrov	Stable Russia	14,415	4.77%
Mikhail Davydov	Communists and Working Russia - for the Soviet Union	13,097	4.33%
Yury Yemelyanov	Ivan Rybkin Bloc	8,901	2.95%
Anastasia Grusha	Party of Economic Freedom	7,466	2.47%
Vitaly Timashov	Independent	6,727	2.23%
Dmitry Anisimov-Spiridonov	Independent	5,367	1.78%
against all		40,859	13.52%
Total		302,210	100%

=== 1999 ===
Summary of the 19 December 1999 Russian legislative election in the Kuntsevo constituency
Candidate	Party	Votes	%
Valery Grebennikov	Fatherland – All Russia	63,398	20.79%
Telman Gdlyan	Independent	46,585	15.28%
Georgy Zadonsky	Union of Right Forces	28,549	9.36%
Natalya Burykina	Independent	28,451	9.33%
Reonold Filimonov	Communist Party	24,953	8.18%
Andrey Boldin	Independent	16,077	5.27%
Grigory Pasko	Kedr	11,861	3.89%
Viktor Isaychenkov	Spiritual Heritage	6,526	2.14%
Tatyana Bryntsalova	Russian Socialist Party	6,098	2.00%
Roman Tushchenko	Independent	5,100	1.67%
Tatyana Tsyba	Social-Democrats of Russia	1,627	0.53%
against all		57,273	18.78%
Total		304,901	100%

=== 2003 ===
Summary of the 7 December 2003 Russian legislative election in the Kuntsevo constituency
Candidate	Party	Votes	%
Valery Grebennikov (incumbent)	United Russia	77,108	29.52%
Galina Zhukova	Independent	33,845	12.96%
Dmitry Prokhorov	Independent	26,508	10.15%
Pavel Basanets	Communist Party	24,753	9.48%
Mikhail Bernovsky	Independent	8,837	3.38%
Igor Dyakov	Liberal Democratic Party	8,643	3.31%
Kamilzhan Kalandarov	Party of Russia's Rebirth-Russian Party of Life	4,227	1.62%
Tengiz Begishvili	United Russian Party Rus'	1,892	0.72%
against all		69,070	26.44%
Total		262,443	100%

=== 2016 ===
Summary of the 18 September 2016 Russian legislative election in the Kuntsevo constituency
Candidate	Party	Votes	%
Vyacheslav Lysakov	United Russia	47,766	29.52%
Yulia Mikhaylova	Communist Party	25,184	15.17%
Igor Nikolayev	Yabloko	21,229	13.12%
Yaroslav Nilov	Liberal Democratic Party	14,283	8.83%
Yevgeny Kolesov	Rodina	13,220	8.17%
Oleg Kazenkov	A Just Russia	12,486	7.72%
Tatyana Mineyeva	Party of Growth	8,676	5.36%
Natalia Yeliseyeva	Civilian Power	5,853	3.62%
Vadim Lukashevich	People's Freedom Party	5,427	3.35%
Total		161,798	100%

=== 2021 ===
Results by district: Yevgeny Popov: 40–50%; Mikhail Lobanov: 30–40% 40–50%

Summary of the 17-19 September 2021 Russian legislative election in the Kuntsevo constituency
Candidate	Party	Votes	%
Yevgeny Popov	United Russia	80,894	35.17%
Mikhail Lobanov	Communist Party	72,805	31.65%
Aleksandr Tarnavsky	A Just Russia — For Truth	13,421	5.84%
Boris Balmont	New People	11,709	5.09%
Kirill Goncharov	Yabloko	11,648	5.06%
Pavel Ramensky	Liberal Democratic Party	10,475	4.55%
Darya Mitina	Communists of Russia	6,493	2.82%
Igor Glek	The Greens	5,473	2.38%
Vladislava Gorshkova	Green Alternative	5,436	2.36%
Aleksey Sobolev	Rodina	3,789	1.65%
Mikhail Menshikov	Party of Growth	3,604	1.57%
Total		230,007	100%

=== 2026 ===
Summary of the 18-20 September 2026 Russian legislative election in the Kuntsevo constituency
Candidate	Party	Votes	%
Yevgeny Popov (incumbent)	United Russia	112,018	49.39%
Andrey Yevteyev	Yabloko	29,542	13.03%
Andrey Lupiy	New People	24,588	10.84%
Oleg Alekseyenko	Communist Party	18,476	8.15%
Valery Budkin	Liberal Democratic Party	16,555	7.30%
Vladimir Kurin	A Just Russia	13,634	6.01%
Dmitry Averin	Communists of Russia	11,296	4.98%
Total		226,781	100%
