= New Moscow constituency =

Russian legislative constituency

New Moscow single-member constituency
- Constituency of the Russian State Duma
- Deputy: Dmitry Sablin; United Russia
- Federal subject: Moscow
- Districts: Novomoskovsky AO, Troitsky AO
- Voters: 519,340 (2026)

The New Moscow constituency (No.201 (Note: No.202 in 2016–2026)) is a Russian legislative constituency in Moscow. The constituency covers Novomoskovsky and Troitsky administrative okrugs, which Moscow added from Moscow Oblast in 2012.

The constituency has been represented since 2016 by United Russia deputy Dmitry Sablin, six-term State Duma member, businessman and Hero of Russia.

== Boundaries ==
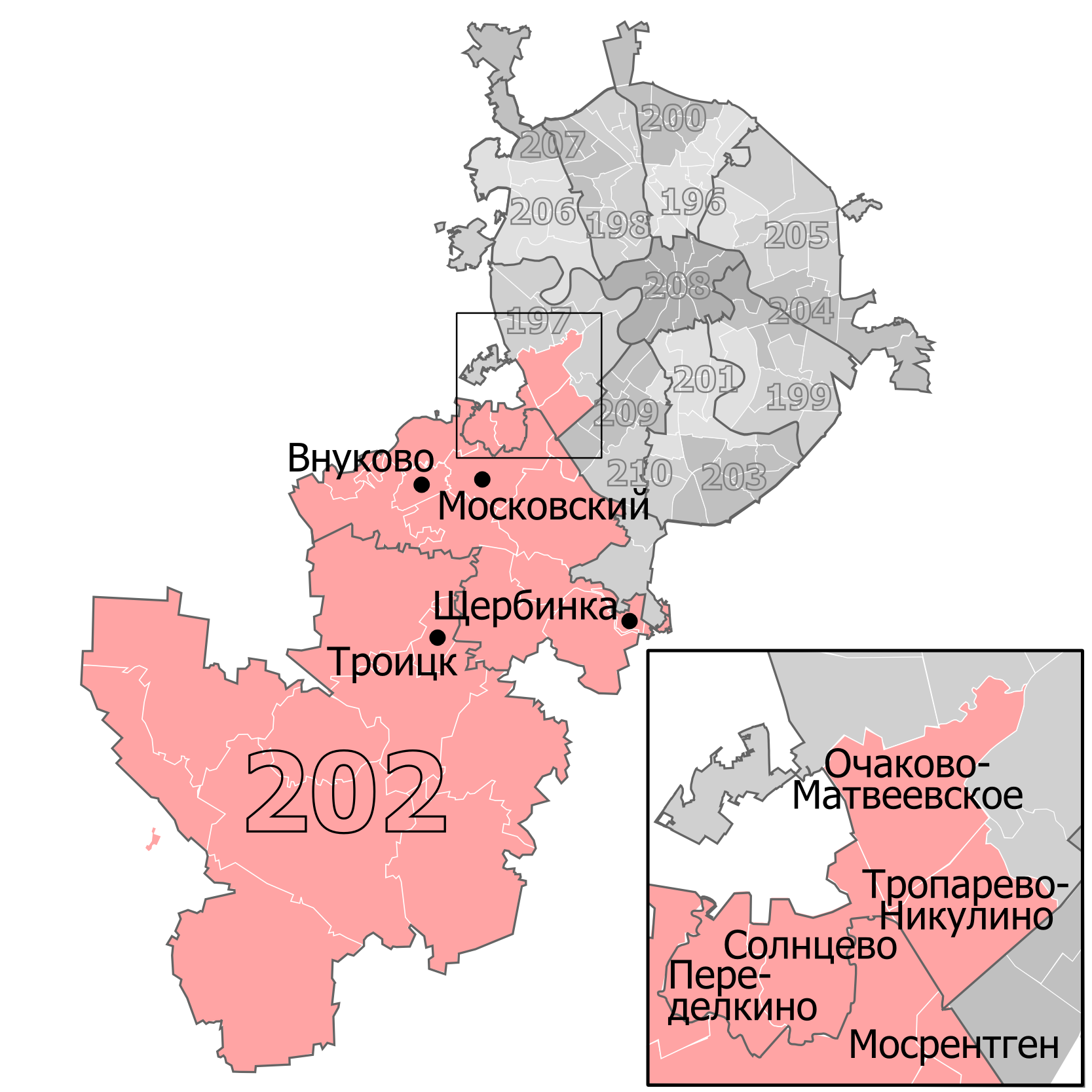
Constituency boundaries from 2016 to 2026

2016–2026: Novomoskovsky Administrative Okrug, Troitsky Administrative Okrug, Western Administrative Okrug (Novo-Peredelkino District, Ochakovo-Matveyevskoye District, Solntsevo District, Troparyovo-Nikulino District, Vnukovo District)
The constituency was created for the 2016 election from parts of former Kuntsevo (Ochakovo-Matveyevskoye), Universitetsky (Novo-Peredelkino, Solntsevo, Troparyovo-Nikulino, Vnukovo), Odintsovo (part of Novomoskovsky Administrative Okrug) and Podolsk (most of Novomoskovsky Administrative Okrug, Troitsky Administrative Okrug) constituencies.

2026–present: Novomoskovsky Administrative Okrug (Filimonkovsky District, Kommunarka District, Shcherbinka District, Vnukovo District), Troitsky Administrative Okrug (Bekasovo District, Krasnopakhorsky District, Troitsk, Voronovo District)
The constituency was significantly altered after the 2025 redistricting as New Moscow became more populous. This seat retained all of Novomoskovsky and Troitsky administrative okrugs, losing Novo-Peredelkino, Ochakovo-Matveyevskoye, Solntsevo and Troparyovo-Nikulino to new Solntsevo constituency; due to Shcherbinka boundary changes this constituency gained small part of the former Chertanovo constituency.

== Members elected ==
Election	Member	Party
2016	Dmitry Sablin	United Russia
2021	Dmitry Sablin	United Russia
2026	Dmitry Sablin	United Russia

== Election results ==
=== 2016 ===
Summary of the 18 September 2016 Russian legislative election in the New Moscow constituency
Candidate	Party	Votes	%
Dmitry Sablin	United Russia	86,875	46.22%
Igor Sagenbayev	Communist Party	19,075	10.15%
Andrey Rudkovsky	Liberal Democratic Party	15,845	8.43%
Viktor Sidnev	Party of Growth	15,643	8.32%
Alina Salnikova	Yabloko	9,876	5.25%
Dmitry Kravchenko	Communists of Russia	8,888	4.73%
Aleksandra Astavina	The Greens	8,640	4.60%
Oleg Beznisko	People's Freedom Party	6,082	3.24%
Anatoly Chuprina	Civilian Power	3,533	1.88%
Aleksey Zheravlyov	Patriots of Russia	3,083	1.64%
Olga Kosets	Civic Platform	2,733	1.45%
Total		187,979	100%

=== 2021 ===
Results by voting area: Dmitry Sablin: 30–40% 40–50%; Danil Makhnitsky: 20–30%

Summary of the 17–19 September 2021 Russian legislative election in the New Moscow constituency
Candidate	Party	Votes	%
Dmitry Sablin (incumbent)	United Russia	132,835	40.71%
Danil Makhnitsky	New People	59,781	18.32%
Igor Sukhanov	Communist Party	34,962	10.72%
Aleksandr Mikhaylovsky	A Just Russia – For Truth	19,776	6.06%
Natalia Andrusenko	Communists of Russia	19,089	5.85%
Aleksey Lapshov	Liberal Democratic Party	16,671	4.80%
Viktor Sidnev	Party of Growth	10,919	3.35%
Yulia Muratova	Green Alternative	9,040	2.77%
Yevgenia Gershberg	Yabloko	8,450	2.59%
Sergey Bogatov	Russian Party of Freedom and Justice	6,801	2.08%
Aleksey Pridorozhny	Civic Platform	3,194	0.98%
Total		326,267	100%

=== 2026 ===
Summary of the 18-20 September 2026 Russian legislative election in the New Moscow constituency
Candidate	Party	Votes	%
Dmitry Sablin (incumbent)	United Russia	138,239	51.01%
Maksim Anisimov	New People	33,994	12.54%
Semyon Kovalev	Yabloko	26,176	9.66%
Aleksey Lapshov	Liberal Democratic Party	25,395	9.37%
Mikhail Potemko-Stetsenko	Communist Party	20,152	7.44%
Natalia Andrusenko	Communists of Russia	16,743	6.18%
Sergey Kovalev	The Greens	9,366	3.46%
Total		270,996	100%
