= Moscow City Duma District 38 =

Moscow City Duma electoral constituency

- Moscow City Duma constituency
- Deputy: vacant
- Administrative Okrug: Novomoskovsky, Western
- Districts: Novo-Peredelkino, Solntsevo, part of Vnukovo
- Voters: 195,199 (2024)

Moscow City Duma District 38 is one of 45 constituencies in Moscow City Duma. Currently the district covers parts of Western Moscow outside the Moscow Ring Road as well as parts of Vnukovo in now-Novomoskovsky Administrative Okrug.

The district has been vacant since September 20, 2026, when first-term Liberal Democratic Party incumbent Maria Voropayeva was elected to the State Duma.

== Boundaries ==
District boundaries from 2014 to 2024

2014–2024: Desyonovskoye, Filimonkovskoye, Kiyevsky, Klenovskoye, Moskovsky, Mosrentgen, parts of Prospekt Vernadskogo, Rogovskoye, Ryazanovskoye, Shachapovskoye, Shcherbinka, Sosenskoye, parts of Troparyovo-Nikulino, Voronovskoye, Voskresenskoye
The district was created prior to the 2014 election, after Moscow City Duma had been expanded from 35 to 45 seats. It covers eastern half of New Moscow, as well as parts of Prospekt Vernadskogo and Troparyovo-Nikulino in Western Moscow.

2024–2025: Novo-Peredelkino, Solntsevo, Vnukovskoye
During the 2023–24 Moscow redistricting the district was completely overhauled as its former territory had been divided between new districts 31, 36, 37 and 39. In its new configuration the district covers parts of Western Moscow outside the Moscow Ring Road: Novo-Peredelkino (formerly District 39) and Solntsevo (formerly District 40), as well as Vnukovskoye in the Novomoskovsky Administrative Okrug (formerly District 39).

From 2025: Novo-Peredelkino, Solntsevo, part of Vnukovo
Due to the adopted consolidation of administrative divisions in New Moscow from January 1, 2025 the district will slightly alter its configuration to correspond with the new municipal districts.

== Members elected ==
Election	Member	Party
2014	Mikhail Balakin	Liberal Democratic Party
2019	Aleksandr Kozlov	Independent
2024	Maria Voropayeva (Note: elected to the State Duma in September 2026)	Independent

== Election results ==
=== 2014 ===
Summary of the 14 September 2014 Moscow City Duma election in District 38
Candidate	Party	Votes	%
Mikhail Balakin	Liberal Democratic Party	20,450	46.01%
Igor Sagenbayev	Communist Party	9,399	21.15%
Denis Shiryayev	A Just Russia	5,262	11.84%
Ilya Khandrikov	Yabloko	3,079	6.93%
Boris Tokayev	Independent	2,197	4.94%
Aleksandr Sheludko	Independent	2,070	4.66%
Total		44,448	100%

=== 2019 ===
Summary of the 8 September 2019 Moscow City Duma election in District 38
Candidate	Party	Votes	%
Aleksandr Kozlov	Independent	22,021	35.65%
Igor Glek	A Just Russia	15,437	24.99%
Lyudmila Yeremina	Communist Party	9,175	14.85%
Stanislav Smirnov	Liberal Democratic Party	6,523	10.56%
Natalia Andrusenko	Communists of Russia	5,179	8.39%
Total		61,765	100%

=== 2024 ===
Summary of the 6–8 September 2024 Moscow City Duma election in District 38
Candidate	Party	Votes	%
Maria Voropayeva	Independent	35,410	42.78%
Yelena Lisovskaya	New People	20,838	25.18%
Mikhail Gusenkov	Communist Party	18,364	22.19%
Sergey Usoltsev	A Just Russia – For Truth	8,146	9.84%
Total		82,769	100%
