= Moscow City Duma District 39 =

Moscow City Duma electoral constituency

- Moscow City Duma constituency
- Deputy: Rodion Gazmanov; United Russia
- Administrative Okrug: Western
- Districts: Prospekt Vernadskogo, Troparyovo-Nikulino, parts of Ramenki
- Voters: 171,282 (2024)

Moscow City Duma District 39 is one of 45 constituencies in Moscow City Duma. Currently the district covers outer parts of Western Moscow.

The district has been represented since its creation in 2024 by United Russia deputy Rodion Gazmanov, a singer and actor.

== Boundaries ==
District boundaries from 2014 to 2024

2014–2024: Kokoshkino, Krasnopakhorskoye, Marushkinskoye, Mikhaylovo-Yartsevskoye, Novo-Peredelkino, Novofyodorovskoye, Pervomayskoye, Troitsk, Vnukovo, Vnukovskoye
The district was created prior to the 2014 election, after Moscow City Duma had been expanded from 35 to 45 seats. It covers western half of New Moscow, as well as Western Moscow exclaves Novo-Peredelkino and Vnukovo.

2024–present: Prospekt Vernadskogo, Troparyovo-Nikulino, parts of Ramenki
During the 2023–24 Moscow redistricting the district was completely overhauled as its former territory had been divided between new District 37 and District 38. In its new configuration the district is located entirely within Western Moscow and is composed from parts of the former District 37 (parts of Prospekt Vernadskogo), District 38 (parts of Prospekt Vernadskogo, parts of Troparyovo-Nikulino), District 40 (parts of Troparyovo-Nikulino) and District 42 (parts of Ramenki).

== Members elected ==
Election	Member	Party
2014	Anton Paleyev	United Russia
2019	Valery Golovchenko	Independent
2024	Rodion Gazmanov	United Russia

== Election results ==
=== 2014 ===
Summary of the 14 September 2014 Moscow City Duma election in District 39
Candidate	Party	Votes	%
Anton Paleyev	United Russia	14,368	39.15%
Viktor Sidnev	Civic Platform	10,107	27.54%
Nikolay Moskovchenko	A Just Russia	4,283	11.67%
Roman Lyabikhov	Communist Party	3,719	10.13%
Aleksandr Nozdrin	Liberal Democratic Party	1,536	4.19%
Dmitry Sysoyev	Yabloko	1,259	3.43%
Total		36,698	100%

=== 2019 ===
Summary of the 8 September 2019 Moscow City Duma election in District 39
Candidate	Party	Votes	%
Valery Golovchenko	Independent	14,992	35.00%
Aleksandr Vidmanov	Communist Party	11,945	27.89%
Andrey Bezryadov	A Just Russia	4,483	10.47%
Aleksandr Mityayev	Liberal Democratic Party	4,374	10.21%
Nikolay Bestayev	Communists of Russia	4,274	9.98%
Total		42,831	100%

=== 2024 ===
Summary of the 6–8 September 2024 Moscow City Duma election in District 39
Candidate	Party	Votes	%
Rodion Gazmanov	United Russia	27,259	47.02%
Irina Rodkina	New People	9,340	16.11%
Aleksandr Mikhaylovsky	A Just Russia – For Truth	6,520	11.25%
Boris Spirin	Liberal Democratic Party	5,949	10.26%
Vladimir Lobanov	Communists of Russia	5,460	9.42%
Ivan Mokshin	Independent	3,412	5.89%
Total		57,973	100%
