= Moscow City Duma District 37 =

Moscow City Duma electoral constituency

- Moscow City Duma constituency
- Deputy: Valery Golovchenko; United Russia
- Administrative Okrug: Novomoskovsky, Troitsky
- Districts: Bekasovo, part of Filimonkovsky, Krasnopakhorsky, Troitsk, Voronovo, part of Vnukovo
- Voters: 196,318 (2024)

Moscow City Duma District 37 is one of 45 constituencies in Moscow City Duma. Currently the district covers outer New Moscow, including all of Troitsky Administrative Okrug and parts of Novomoskovsky Administrative Okrug.

The district has been represented since 2024 by United Russia deputy Valery Golovchenko, (Note: member of My Moscow faction in 2019–2024) a two-term member and transportation executive, who was redistricted from District 39.

== Boundaries ==
District boundaries from 2014 to 2024

2014–2024: Akademichesky, Gagarinsky, Lomonosovsky, parts of Prospekt Vernadskogo
The district was created prior to the 2014 election, after Moscow City Duma had been expanded from 35 to 45 seats. It covers parts of South-Western Moscow, as well as parts of Prospekt Vernadskogo in Western Moscow.

2024–2025: Desyonovskoye, Filimonkovskoye, Kiyevsky, Klyonovskoye, Kokoshkino, Krasnopakhorskoye, Marushkinskoye, Mikhaylovo-Yartsevskoye, Novofyodorovskoye, Pervomayskoye, Rogovskoye, Shchapovskoye, Troitsk, Vnukovo, Voronovskoye
During the 2023–24 Moscow redistricting most of the district's territory was placed into District 35, except for parts of Prospekt Vernadskogo, which was united with the rest of the raion in District 39. In its new configuration the district was created from parts of districts 38 and 39, covering most of New Moscow and Western Moscow's exclave of Vnukovo.

From 2025: Bekasovo, part of Filimonkovsky, Krasnopakhorsky, Troitsk, Voronovo, part of Vnukovo
Due to the adopted consolidation of administrative divisions in New Moscow from January 1, 2025 the district will slightly alter its configuration to correspond with the new municipal districts.

== Members elected ==
Election	Member	Party
2014	Nikolay Gubenko (Note: died in August 2020)	Communist Party
2019	Nikolay Gubenko	Communist Party
2021	Vladimir Ryzhkov (Note: resigned in December 2023)	Yabloko
2024	Valery Golovchenko	United Russia

== Election results ==
=== 2014 ===
Summary of the 14 September 2014 Moscow City Duma election in District 37
Candidate	Party	Votes	%
Nikolay Gubenko	Communist Party	11,145	31.73%
Yelena Rusakova	Yabloko	9,002	25.63%
Mikhail Vyshegorodtsev	Civic Platform	4,454	12.68%
Aleksey Silnov	Independent	4,421	12.59%
Yulia Rubleva	A Just Russia	3,091	8.80%
Gennady Mishin	Liberal Democratic Party	1,203	3.43%
Sirazhdin Ramazanov	Social Democratic Party	434	1.24%
Total		35,124	100%

=== 2019 ===
Summary of the 8 September 2019 Moscow City Duma election in District 37
Candidate	Party	Votes	%
Nikolay Gubenko (incumbent)	Communist Party	20,621	58.29%
Yury Maksimov	Liberal Democratic Party	6,751	19.08%
Aleksandr Romanovich	A Just Russia	6,076	17.18%
Total		35,377	100%

=== 2021 ===
Summary of the 17-19 September 2021 by-election to the Moscow City Duma in District 37
Candidate	Party	Votes	%
Vladimir Ryzhkov	Yabloko	16,623	21.05%
Darya Bagina	Communist Party	15,658	19.83%
Yekaterina Razzakova	United Russia	12,822	16.24%
Maksim Chirkov	A Just Russia — For Truth	9,274	11.75%
Yury Maksimov	Liberal Democratic Party	5,553	7.03%
Yury Dmitriyev	New People	5,200	6.59%
Roman Khudyakov	Independent	4,580	5.80%
Aleksandr Bely	Independent	4,561	5.78%
Leonid Afanasyev	Communists of Russia	2,849	3.61%
Total		78,958	100%

=== 2024 ===
Summary of the 6–8 September 2024 Moscow City Duma election in District 37
Candidate	Party	Votes	%
Valery Golovchenko (incumbent) (Note: redistricted from District 39)	United Russia	39,969	49.69%
Viktor Sidnev	Independent	9,485	11.79%
Sergey Kovalev	New People	8,983	11.17%
Nadezhda Leontyeva	Liberal Democratic Party	8,093	10.06%
Ruslan Shalamov	A Just Russia – For Truth	5,482	6.82%
Natalia Andrusenko	Communists of Russia	5,036	6.26%
Aleksey Bayramov	Communist Party	3,333	4.14%
Total		80,440	100%
