= Moscow City Duma District 41 =

Moscow City Duma electoral constituency

- Moscow City Duma constituency
- Deputy: Yevgeny Gerasimov; United Russia
- Administrative Okrug: Western
- Districts: Krylatskoye, parts of Kuntsevo, parts of Mozhaysky
- Voters: 174,401 (2024)

Moscow City Duma District 41 is one of 45 constituencies in Moscow City Duma. Currently the district covers outer parts of Western Moscow.

The district has been represented since 2019 by United Russia member Yevgeny Gerasimov, a former actor and six-term Moscow City Duma member, who moved from District 4 to succeed retiring United Russia incumbent and INGRAD president Pavel Poselyonov.

== Boundaries ==
District boundaries from 2014 to 2024

2014–2024: parts of Fili-Davydkovo, parts of Kuntsevo, Mozhaysky
The district was created prior to the 2014 election, after Moscow City Duma had been expanded from 35 to 45 seats. It covers parts of Western Moscow.

2024–present: Krylatskoye, parts of Kuntsevo, parts of Mozhaysky
As the result of the 2023–24 Moscow redistricting the district gained Krylatskoye and most of Kuntsevo, except for exclaves of Rublyovo, Myakinino, Rublyovo-Arkhangelskoye and "Konezavod, VTB", from District 4 and ceded remaining parts of Fili-Davydkovo to District 42 and western Mozhaysky District (including the territory of Skolkovo Innovation Centre) – to District 40.

== Members elected ==
| Election | Member | Party |
|---|---|---|
| 2014 | Pavel Poselyonov | United Russia |
| 2019 | Yevgeny Gerasimov | Independent |
| 2024 | Yevgeny Gerasimov | United Russia |

== Election results ==
=== 2014 ===
Summary of the 14 September 2014 Moscow City Duma election in District 41
| Candidate | Party | Votes | % |
|---|---|---|---|
| Pavel Poselyonov | United Russia | 12,192 | 40.26% |
| Maria Aleksandrova | Communist Party | 5,947 | 19.64% |
| Oleg Kazenkov | A Just Russia | 3,380 | 11.16% |
| Pyotr Lempert | Civic Platform | 3,220 | 10.63% |
| Dmitry Tupikin | Yabloko | 2,236 | 7.38% |
| Ruslan Zakharkin | Liberal Democratic Party | 2,164 | 7.15% |
| Total | | 30,284 | 100% |

=== 2019 ===
Summary of the 8 September 2019 Moscow City Duma election in District 41
| Candidate | Party | Votes | % |
|---|---|---|---|
| Yevgeny Gerasimov | Independent | 12,602 | 41.08% |
| Olga Frolova | Communist Party | 10,546 | 34.38% |
| Aleksey Sobolev | Independent | 2,228 | 7.26% |
| German Bogatyrenko | Liberal Democratic Party | 2,154 | 7.02% |
| Yekaterina Pavlova | Communists of Russia | 2,002 | 6.53% |
| Total | | 30,678 | 100% |

=== 2024 ===
Summary of the 6–8 September 2024 Moscow City Duma election in District 41
| Candidate | Party | Votes | % |
|---|---|---|---|
| Yevgeny Gerasimov (incumbent) | United Russia | 34,416 | 52.89% |
| Natalya Kryuchkova | Communist Party | 8,260 | 12.69% |
| Valery Budkin | Liberal Democratic Party | 8,240 | 12.66% |
| Maria Gorbulina | New People | 7,262 | 11.16% |
| Konstantin Konkov | A Just Russia – For Truth | 6,868 | 10.55% |
| Total | | 65,071 | 100% |
