= Moscow City Duma District 4 =

Moscow City Duma electoral constituency

- Moscow City Duma constituency
- Deputy: Mariya Kiselyova; United Russia
- Administrative Okrug: North-Western, Western
- Districts: part of Kuntsevo, part of Pokrovskoye-Streshnevo, Shchukino, Strogino
- Voters: 183,551 (2024)

Moscow City Duma District 4 is one of 45 constituencies in Moscow City Duma. Currently the district covers parts of North-Western and Western Moscow.

The district has been represented since 2019 by United Russia deputy Mariya Kiselyova, (Note: member of My Moscow faction in 2019–2024) a TV host and three-time Olympic Champion synchronized swimmer, who succeeded four-term United Russia incumbent Yevgeny Gerasimov, who switched to District 41.

== Boundaries ==
District boundaries from 2014 to 2024

1993–1997: Businovo (Note: merged into Zapadnoye Degunino District in 1997), Golovinsky, Khovrino, Levoberezhny, Molzhaninovsky
The district covered outer parts of Northern Moscow.

1997–2005: Golovinsky, Khovrino, Levoberezhny, Molzhaninovsky, Voykovsky
The district continued to cover outer parts of Northern Moscow but lost its part of Zapadnoye Degunino (former Businovo) to District 5, in exchange gaining Voykovsky District from District 7.

2005–2014: Altufyevsky, Bibirevo, Lianozovo, Otradnoye, Severnoye Medvedkovo, Severny, Yuzhnoye Medvedkovo
The district was completely reconfigured as it was placed into North-Eastern Moscow, overlapping the then-eliminated State Duma Medvedkovo constituency.

2014–2024: Krylatskoye, part of Kuntsevo, Strogino
The district was completely rearranged in the 2014 redistricting as it was moved to cover parts of North-Western and Western Moscow.

2024–present: part of Kuntsevo, part of Pokrovskoye-Streshnevo, Shchukino, Strogino
During the 2023–24 Moscow redistricting the district retained Strogino and part of Kuntsevo, losing Krylatskoye to District 41; the district also gained most of Pokrovskoye-Streshnevo from District 3 and Shchukino from districts 3 and 5.

== Members elected ==
Election	Member	Party
1993	Vyacheslav Makarov	Russian Democratic Reform Movement
1997	Igor Antonov	Independent
2001	Igor Antonov	Independent
2005	Valery Shaposhnikov	United Russia
2009	Valery Shaposhnikov	United Russia
2014	Yevgeny Gerasimov	United Russia
2019	Mariya Kiselyova	Independent
2024	Mariya Kiselyova	United Russia

== Election results ==
=== 2001 ===
Summary of the 16 December 2001 Moscow City Duma election in District 4
Candidate	Party	Votes	%
Igor Antonov (incumbent)	Independent	35,865	58.95%
Yelena Guseva	Union of Right Forces	7,209	11.85%
Mark Antonov	Independent	4,114	6.76%
Vladimir Shmelev	We — First Free Generation	3,042	5.00%
Leonid Besov	Independent	1,336	2.20%
against all		7,499	12.33%
Total		61,746	100%

=== 2005 ===
Summary of the 4 December 2005 Moscow City Duma election in District 4
Candidate	Party	Votes	%
Valery Shaposhnikov (incumbent) (Note: redistricted from District 8)	United Russia	68,748	51.19%
Nikolay Zubrilin	Communist Party	25,871	19.26%
Kira Lukyanova	Rodina	18,898	14.07%
Vladislav Tavadov	Independent	6,912	5.15%
Dmitry Nikonov	Independent	4,478	3.33%
Total		134,298	100%

=== 2009 ===
Summary of the 11 October 2009 Moscow City Duma election in District 4
Candidate	Party	Votes	%
Valery Shaposhnikov (incumbent)	United Russia	101,217	66.55%
Vladimir Popov	Communist Party	24,544	16.14%
Anton Sokolov	Liberal Democratic Party	10,985	7.22%
Dmitry Nikonov	Independent	7,337	4.82%
Total		152,103	100%

=== 2014 ===
Summary of the 14 September 2014 Moscow City Duma election in District 4
Candidate	Party	Votes	%
Yevgeny Gerasimov (incumbent) (Note: redistricted from District 16)	United Russia	19,383	51.78%
Irina Kopkina	Yabloko	8,828	23.58%
Rustam Makhmudov	Communist Party	3,713	9.92%
Irina Pavlenko	A Just Russia	3,102	8.29%
Svyatoslav Alyrin	Liberal Democratic Party	1,290	3.45%
Total		37,431	100%

=== 2019 ===
Summary of the 8 September 2019 Moscow City Duma election in District 4
Candidate	Party	Votes	%
Mariya Kiselyova	Independent	14,835	41.29%
Sergey Desyatkin	Communist Party	12,598	35.06%
Darya Mitina	Communists of Russia	3,589	9.99%
Vladimir Bessonov	Liberal Democratic Party	2,348	6.54%
Erik Lobakh	A Just Russia	1,344	3.74%
Total		35,928	100%

=== 2024 ===
Summary of the 6–8 September 2024 Moscow City Duma election in District 4
Candidate	Party	Votes	%
Mariya Kiselyova (incumbent)	United Russia	37,244	53.76%
Andrey Grebennik	Communist Party	8,864	12.80%
Alexey Gavrilov	New People	5,146	7.43%
Valentin Orionov	Liberal Democratic Party	4,527	6.54%
Arkady Agranat	The Greens	3,122	4.51%
Aleksandr Vasilyev	Communists of Russia	3,010	4.35%
Yevgeny Budnik	A Just Russia – For Truth	2,751	3.97%
Mikhail Parfyonov	Independent	2,486	3.59%
Andrey Kabushev	Independent	2,046	2.95%
Total		69,272	100%
