= Moscow City Duma District 40 =

Moscow City Duma electoral constituency

- Moscow City Duma constituency
- Deputy: Tatyana Batysheva; United Russia
- Administrative Okrug: Western
- Districts: parts of Mozhaysky, Ochakovo-Matveyevskoye, parts of Ramenki
- Voters: 164,544 (2024)

Moscow City Duma District 40 is one of 45 constituencies in Moscow City Duma. Currently the district covers outer parts of Western Moscow.

The district has been represented since 2019 by United Russia member Tatyana Batysheva, a pediatric neurologist and three-term Moscow City Duma member, who moved from the neighbouring District 42 to succeed retiring United Russia three-term incumbent and businessman Aleksandr Milyavsky.

== Boundaries ==
District boundaries from 2014 to 2024

2014–2024: Ochakovo-Matveyevskoye, Solntsevo, parts of Troparyovo-Nikulino
The district was created prior to the 2014 election, after Moscow City Duma had been expanded from 35 to 45 seats. It covers parts of Western Moscow, including Solntsevo just outside the Moscow Ring Road.

2024–present: parts of Mozhaysky, Ochakovo-Matveyevskoye, parts of Ramenki
During the 2023–24 Moscow redistricting the district was pushed to the north and east gaining western parts of Mozhaysky District (including the territory of Skolkovo Innovation Centre) from District 41 and northern Ramenki from District 42, while losing remaining parts of Troparyovo-Nikulino to District 39 and Solntsevo – to District 38.

== Members elected ==
Election	Member	Party
2014	Aleksandr Milyavsky	United Russia
2019	Tatyana Batysheva	Independent
2024	Tatyana Batysheva	United Russia

== Election results ==
=== 2014 ===
Summary of the 14 September 2014 Moscow City Duma election in District 40
Candidate	Party	Votes	%
Aleksandr Milyavsky (incumbent) (Note: redistricted from District 15)	United Russia	17,609	51.23%
Vladimir Svyatoshenko	Communist Party	5,572	16.21%
Olga Radayeva	Yabloko	4,191	12.19%
Pavel Ramensky	Liberal Democratic Party	3,255	9.47%
Yury Pavlenkov	A Just Russia	2,495	7.26%
Total		34,373	100%

=== 2019 ===
Summary of the 8 September 2019 Moscow City Duma election in District 40
Candidate	Party	Votes	%
Tatyana Batysheva	Independent	13,280	37.14%
Igor Sukhanov	Communist Party	11,718	32.77%
Aleksandr Mikhaylovsky	A Just Russia	3,585	10.03%
Sergey Geraskin	Liberal Democratic Party	2,601	7.27%
Sergey Moroz	Communists of Russia	1,866	5.22%
Sergey Matveyev	Rodina	1,308	3.66%
Total		35,760	100%

=== 2024 ===
Summary of the 6–8 September 2024 Moscow City Duma election in District 40
Candidate	Party	Votes	%
Tatyana Batysheva (incumbent)	United Russia	30,215	50.62%
Igor Sharapov	New People	9,803	16.42%
Ivan Arkhipov	Communist Party	8,533	14.30%
Vsevolod Voronin	Liberal Democratic Party	7,742	12.97%
Konstantin Bulavitsky	A Just Russia – For Truth	3,358	5.63%
Total		59,684	100%
