= Zapadny =

Zapadny (masculine), Zapadnaya (feminine), Zapadnoye (neuter), or Zapadnyy may refer to:

- Zapadny Okrug (disambiguation), several okrugs and city okrugs in Russia
- Zapadny District, until 1960, name of Gorodovikovsky District of the Republic of Kalmykia, Russia
- Zapadny (rural locality) (Zapadnaya, Zapadnoye), several rural localities in Russia
- Zapadnaya crater, an impact crater in Ukraine
- Zapadnyy (village), a small village located in Kostroma Oblast, Russia
