= Moscow City Duma District 42 =

Moscow City Duma electoral constituency

- Moscow City Duma constituency
- Deputy: Irina Slutskaya; United Russia
- Administrative Okrug: Western
- Districts: Dorogomilovo, Fili-Davydkovo, Filyovsky Park
- Voters: 154,186 (2024)

Moscow City Duma District 42 is one of 45 constituencies in Moscow City Duma. Currently the district covers inner parts of Western Moscow.

The district has been represented since 2024 by United Russia deputy Irina Slutskaya, an Olympic figure skater and former Moscow Oblast Duma member, who succeeded one-term Communist incumbent Yekaterina Yengalycheva after Yengalycheva was deselected at the party convention.

== Boundaries ==
District boundaries from 2014 to 2024

2014–2024: Dorogomilovo, parts of Fili-Davydkovo, Ramenki
The district was created prior to the 2014 election, after Moscow City Duma had been expanded from 35 to 45 seats. It covers parts of Western Moscow.

2024–present: Dorogomilovo, Fili-Davydkovo, Filyovsky Park
As the result of the 2023–24 Moscow redistricting the district took all remaining parts of Fili-Davydkovo from District 41 as well as Filyovsky Park from the dismantled District 5, while Ramenki was divided between District 39 and District 40.

== Members elected ==
Election	Member	Party
2014	Tatyana Batysheva	United Russia
2019	Yekaterina Yengalycheva	Communist Party
2024	Irina Slutskaya	United Russia

== Election results ==
=== 2014 ===
Summary of the 14 September 2014 Moscow City Duma election in District 42
Candidate	Party	Votes	%
Tatyana Batysheva	United Russia	14,314	45.37%
Yury Novikov	Communist Party	6,884	21.82%
Mikhail Menshikov	Yabloko	4,911	15.56%
Aleksandr Chuyev	A Just Russia	2,989	9.47%
Aleksey Loginov	Liberal Democratic Party	1,439	4.56%
Total		31,552	100%

=== 2019 ===
Summary of the 8 September 2019 Moscow City Duma election in District 42
Candidate	Party	Votes	%
Yekaterina Yengalycheva	Communist Party	14,298	42.72%
Kirill Nikitin	Independent	6,948	20.76%
Pavel Ramensky	Liberal Democratic Party	3,179	9.50%
Boris Kagarlitsky	A Just Russia	2,974	8.89%
Mikhail Menshikov	Independent	2,936	8.77%
Olga Korshunova	Communists of Russia	1,203	3.59%
Marina Kostycheva	Rodina	916	2.74%
Total		33,470	100%

=== 2024 ===
Summary of the 6–8 September 2024 Moscow City Duma election in District 42
Candidate	Party	Votes	%
Irina Slutskaya	United Russia	28,742	53.43%
Andrey Staroverov	Communist Party	8,465	15.74%
Yekaterina Bazanova	New People	7,472	13.89%
Ivan Kurguzov	Liberal Democratic Party	6,150	11.43%
Sergey Bykov	A Just Russia – For Truth	2,934	5.45%
Total		53,796	100%
