= Zapadny (rural locality) =

Zapadny (Russian: За́падный; masculine), Zapadnaya (За́падная; feminine), or Zapádnoye (Западное; neuter) is the name of several rural localities in Russia:

- Zapadny, Republic of Adygea, a settlement under the administrative jurisdiction of the republican urban okrug of Maykop, the Republic of Adygea
- Zapadny, Altai Krai, a settlement in Ponomarevsky Selsoviet of Ust-Kalmansky District of Altai Krai
- Zapadny, Republic of Bashkortostan, a village in Kashkalashinsky Selsoviet of Blagovarsky District of the Republic of Bashkortostan
- Zapadny, Chelyabinsk Oblast, a settlement in Kremenkulsky Selsoviet of Sosnovsky District of Chelyabinsk Oblast
- Zapadny, Kostroma Oblast, a settlement in Sudislavskoye Settlement of Sudislavsky District of Kostroma Oblast
- Zapadny, Orenburgsky District, Orenburg Oblast, a settlement in Zauralny Selsoviet of Orenburgsky District of Orenburg Oblast
- Zapadny, Tashlinsky District, Orenburg Oblast, a settlement in Stepnoy Selsoviet of Tashlinsky District of Orenburg Oblast
- Zapadny, Primorsky Krai, a settlement in Nadezhdinsky District of Primorsky Krai
- Zapadny, Ilyinskoye Rural Settlement, Belokalitvinsky District, Rostov Oblast, a khutor in Ilyinskoye Rural Settlement of Belokalitvinsky District of Rostov Oblast
- Zapadny, Sinegorskoye Rural Settlement, Belokalitvinsky District, Rostov Oblast, a khutor in Sinegorskoye Rural Settlement of Belokalitvinsky District of Rostov Oblast
- Zapadny, Semikarakorsky District, Rostov Oblast, a settlement in Zolotarevskoye Rural Settlement of Semikarakorsky District of Rostov Oblast
- Zapadny, Samara Oblast, a settlement in Bogatovsky District of Samara Oblast
- Zapadnaya (rural locality), a village in Chastinsky District of Perm Krai
