= Moscow City Duma District 36 =

Moscow City Duma electoral constituency

- Moscow City Duma constituency
- Deputy: Aleksandr Kozlov; United Russia
- Administrative Okrug: Novomoskovsky
- Districts: part of Filimonkovsky, Kommunarka, part of Shcherbinka
- Voters: 207,751 (2024)

Moscow City Duma District 36 is one of 45 constituencies in Moscow City Duma. The constituency covers inner parts of Novomoskovsky Administrative Okrug in New Moscow.

The district has been represented since 2024 by United Russia deputy Aleksandr Kozlov, a two-term member and housing and communal services expert, who was redistricted from District 38.

== Boundaries ==
District boundaries from 2014 to 2024

2014–2024: Cheryomushki, Kotlovka, Obruchevsky
The district was created prior to the 2014 election, after Moscow City Duma had been expanded from 35 to 45 seats. It covers parts of South-Western Moscow.

2024–2025: Moskovsky, Mosrentgen, Ryazanovskoye, parts of Shcherbinka, Sosenskoye, Voskresenskoye
During the 2023–24 Moscow redistricting most of the district's territory was placed into District 34, while Kotlovka was ceded to District 35. In its new configuration the district was created from parts of District 38, covering parts of inner Novomoskovsky Administrative Okrug.

From 2025: part of Filimonkovsky, Kommunarka, part of Shcherbinka
Due to the adopted consolidation of administrative divisions in New Moscow from January 1, 2025 the district will slightly alter its configuration to correspond with the new municipal districts.

== Members elected ==
Election	Member	Party
2014	Olga Sharapova	Independent
2019	Olga Sharapova	Independent
2024	Aleksandr Kozlov	United Russia

== Election results ==
=== 2014 ===
Summary of the 14 September 2014 Moscow City Duma election in District 36
Candidate	Party	Votes	%
Olga Sharapova	Independent	15,222	50.08%
Sergey Ross	A Just Russia	4,843	15.93%
Nikolay Volkov	Communist Party	4,561	15.01%
Grigory Semenov	Yabloko	3,515	11.57%
Vladimir Grinchenko	Liberal Democratic Party	1,137	3.74%
Total		30,393	100%

=== 2019 ===
Summary of the 8 September 2019 Moscow City Duma election in District 36
Candidate	Party	Votes	%
Olga Sharapova (incumbent)	Independent	10,871	35.23%
Sergey Kurgansky	Communist Party	10,845	35.15%
Dmitry Repnikov	Liberal Democratic Party	3,618	11.73%
Olesya Ryabtseva	A Just Russia	2,141	6.94%
Aleksey Pokatayev	Communists of Russia	1,308	4.24%
Artyom Papeta	Independent	1,084	3.51%
Total		30,857	100%

=== 2024 ===
Summary of the 6–8 September 2024 Moscow City Duma election in District 36
Candidate	Party	Votes	%
Aleksandr Kozlov (incumbent) (Note: redistricted from District 38)	United Russia	43,528	50.50%
Aleksey Lapshov	Liberal Democratic Party	11,175	12.97%
Yelena Chekan	Communist Party	10,321	11.97%
Sergey Tumasov	New People	8,074	9.37%
Mikhail Trushin	Independent	6,637	7.70%
Igor Lipin	A Just Russia – For Truth	5,929	6.88%
Total		86,189	100%
