= Zapadny Okrug =

Zapadny Okrug may refer to:

- Western Administrative Okrug (Zapadny administrativny okrug), an administrative okrug of the federal city of Moscow, Russia
- Zapadny Okrug, Belgorod, a city okrug of Belgorod, Belgorod Oblast, Russia
- Zapadny Okrug, Krasnodar, a city okrug of Krasnodar, Krasnodar Krai, Russia
