= Dmitry Sablin =

Russian politician

Dmitry Sablin MP
- Дмитрий Саблин
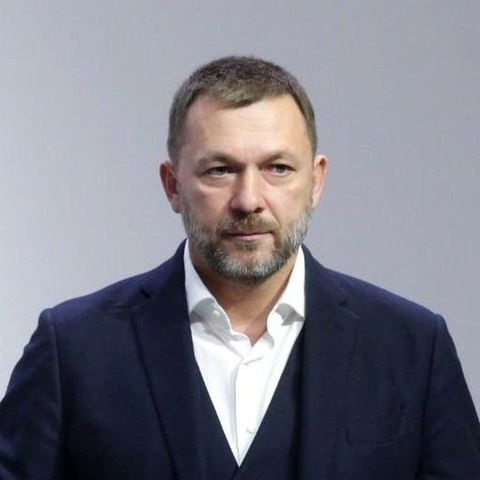
- Sablin in 2021

Member of the State Duma for Moscow
- Incumbent
- Assumed office 5 October 2016
- Preceded by: constituency established
- Constituency: New Moscow (No. 202)

Russian Federation Senator from Moscow Oblast
- In office 16 September 2013 – 18 September 2016
- Preceded by: Boris Gromov
- Succeeded by: Yury Lipatov

Member of the State Duma (Party List Seat)
- In office 24 December 2007 – 18 June 2013
- Succeeded by: Boris Gromov

Member of the State Duma for Moscow Oblast
- In office 29 December 2003 – 24 December 2007
- Preceded by: Svetlana Savitskaya
- Succeeded by: constituencies abolished
- Constituency: Pushkino (No. 114)

Personal details
- Born: September 5, 1968 (age 58) Zhdanov, Ukrainian SSR, Soviet Union
- Party: United Russia
- Spouse: Alla Sablina
- Children: 3 (2 sons, 1 daughter)
- Education: MVOKU; Moscow State University of Service; VAGSh RF Armed Forces
- Website: sablin.ru

Dmitry Vadimovich Sablin (Russian: Дми́трий Вади́мович Са́блин; born 5 September 1968) is a Ukrainian-born Russian politician, who has served as a Member of the State Duma since 2016, having previously held the office between 2003 and 2013. Sablin served as Senator from Moscow Oblast from 2013 to 2016. He is a member of the ruling United Russia party and represents New Moscow.

Outside of parliament, he is the First Deputy Chair of the Fighting Fraternity (Boyevoye bratstvo) veterans organisations.

First Deputy Chairman of the All-Russian Veterans Public Organization "Combat Brotherhood", Colonel. Candidate of Economic Sciences (2002). Subject of anti-corruption investigations. Hero of the Russian Federation (2024).

Due to Russia's invasion of Ukraine, he is under personal sanctions imposed by the 27 EU countries, the United States, Canada, New Zealand, and Ukraine.

== Education ==
- Moscow Higher All-Arms Command School named after Supreme Soviet of the RSFSR (1989);
- Military Academy of the General Staff of the Russian Federation Armed Forces (courses, 2008, 2015);
- Moscow State University of Service (Russian State University of Tourism and Service) (2003).

== Political career ==
=== In parliament ===
Sablin is head of the State Duma group that oversees ties between Russian and Syrian lawmakers.

=== Support for military unit 74455 ===
According to Meduza, the Rota Development holding company (Russian: холдинг «Рота Девелопмент») owned by Sablin, who is strongly supported by his assistant Valery V. Zaborovsky (Russian: Валерий В. Заборовский), (Note: Valery V. Zaborovsky (Russian: Валерий В. Заборовский) is called "Putin's propagandist" and "provocateur" for "anti-Ukrainian publications" and "inciting ethnic hatred and spreading disinformation" and in whose name both the antimaidan.ru website (Russian: «Антимайдан») and "anti-Maidan.rf" are registered.) built the GRU associated 20-story "Khimki Tower" or simply "The Tower" (Russian: «Башня») or "Novator Tower" (Russian: «Новатор-Тауэр»), which is located at 22 Kirova Street in the Moscow suburb of Khimki and allegedly houses the military unit 74455 (Russian: войсковая часть 74455 находится по адресу Химки, улица Кирова, 22). (Note: "The Tower" (Russian: «Башню»), which is sometimes listed on websites as the "Rota Tower" (Russian: «Рота-Тауэр»), was once known as the Novator business center (Russian: бизнес-центр «Новатор») and was built over several years opening in 2015. JSC Oboronstroy (Russian: АО «Оборонстрой»), which is located at the legal address in Moscow at Komsomolsky Prospekt, 18, Building 3 (Russian: юридический адрес АО "Оборонстрой" – Москва, Комсомольский проспект, 18 строение 3), is a firm wholly owned by the Russian defense ministry, was headed by Timur Ivanov from 2013 to 2016 and is managed by the Sergei Innokentyevich Ten (Russian: Сергей Иннокентьевич Тен) led JSC Garrison (Russian: АО «Гарнизон»), purchased the building in February 2016. (Note: Allegedly, also located at the JSC Oboronstroy legal address in Moscow at Komsomolsky Prospekt, 18, Building 3, which is the complex of the former Khamovnichesky barracks in the center of Moscow (Russian: АО "Оборонстрой", компания расположена в комплексе бывших Хамовнических казарм в центре Москвы), and, allegedly, also at the former Khamovnichesky barracks at 20 Komsomolsky Prospekt (Russian: Комсомольский проспект, дом 20) is the location of "GRU hackers" military unit 26165 (Russian: "хакерами ГРУ", 26165). The former Khamovnichesky barracks at 20 Komsomolsky Prospekt is also the location of the military university of the Russian Ministry of Defense (Russian: адресу Комсомольский пр., 20 - это военный университет Министерства обороны России) which is also known as the Prince Alexander Nevsky Military University (Russian: Военный университет им. князя Александра Невского) since 24 September 2021. The 85th Main Special Service Center, which was headed by Sergei Grizunov (Russian: Сергей Гизунов) who later became a deputy under the head of the GRU Sergei Korobov (Russian: Игорь Коробов), is located here.) As of July 2018, "The Tower" is officially called the "Daily Operations Management Center" (Russian: «Центр управления повседневной деятельностью»), which according to the Chief of the General Staff Valery Gerasimov in 2014, was created "for the operational coordination of military command and control agencies" (Russian: «для оперативной координации деятельности органов военного управления»).) Robert Mueller alleged that military unit 74455 supported DCLeaks and the hacking of the DNC email accounts.

=== Activism in Ukraine ===
Beginning in January 2015, Sablin was involved in the creation of an Anti-Maidan Russian nationalist movement.

As of 22 April 2024, the UK MoD claimed that Dmitry Sables created a new BARS unit, a Bars Kaskad drone unit, far behind the front line for VIPs and Kremlin elite. With additional security, it allows VIPs to serve in Ukraine with a reduced risk of harm. On 16 April 2024, the husband of Russian blogger Yelena Blinovskaya, Alexei Blinovskiy served in it.

=== Sanctions ===
On September 30, 2022, amid the Russian invasion of Ukraine, he was added to the U.S. sanctions list in response to "sham referendums" and the "annexation of Ukrainian territories by Russian occupation forces." The U.S. Department of State noted that deputies unanimously adopted legislation on fake news, with some deputies playing a key role in disseminating Russian disinformation about the war.

On December 16, 2022, he was included in the sanctions list of the 27 countries of the European Union for supporting and implementing policies undermining the territorial integrity, sovereignty, and independence of Ukraine, as he "voted for the illegal annexation of Ukraine’s Donetsk, Luhansk, Kherson, and Zaporizhzhia regions."

On February 23, 2023, he was placed on Canada's sanctions list targeting "regime associates," as he "voted for legislation related to the invasion and attempted annexation of four Ukrainian regions."

Earlier, he was included on similar grounds in the sanctions lists of Switzerland, Ukraine, and New Zealand.

== Personal life ==
Sablin is married to Alla Sablina (née Nalcha), who is the General Director of Rota Real Estate.

Dmitry Sablin co-owns several Rota Group assets, including Rota-Krym, which owns property in the annexed region of Crimea. According to TV Rain, Sablin is one of the wealthiest members of the State Duma.
