= Zapadny, Altai Krai =

Zapadny Западный
- Settlement
- Location within Altai Krai Location within Russia
- Coordinates: 52°07′N 83°03′E
- Country: Russia
- Region: Altai Krai
- District: Ust-Kalmansky District
- Time zone: UTC+7:00

Zapadny (Russian: Западный) is a rural locality (a settlement) in Ponomaryovsky Selsoviet, Ust-Kalmansky District, Altai Krai, Russia. The population was 50 as of 2013. There are 2 streets.

== Geography ==
Zapadny is located 32 km west of Ust-Kalmanka (the district's administrative centre) by road. Ponomaryovo is the nearest rural locality.
