= Darya Aslamova =

Russian journalist

Darya Mikhailovna Aslamova (Russian: Да́рья Миха́йловна Асла́мова; born September 8, 1969, Khabarovsk) is a Soviet and Russian journalist, writer, radio host. Columnist, special correspondent for the Komsomolskaya Pravda newspaper. Author of the book The Adventures of a Mean Girl (1994).

She worked as a military correspondent for the Komsomolskaya Pravda newspaper in hot spots (Abkhazia, Nagorno-Karabakh, Cambodia, Ossetia, Tajikistan, Yugoslavia, Rwanda, Chechnya, Mali).

On the night of August 6-7, 2022, the Kosovo Police detained a journalist at the border with Serbia on suspicion of espionage. After interrogation, she was released and went to Serbia.

On January 15, 2023, due to the 2022 Russian Invasion of Ukraine, she was included in the sanctions list of Ukraine, it is supposed to block assets in the country, suspend the fulfillment of economic and financial obligations, stop cultural exchanges and cooperation, deprive Ukrainian state awards.
