= New Moscow, Moscow =

Territories of the former Moscow Oblast

New Moscow (orange shading) corresponds to today's Novomoskovsky Administrative Okrug, Troitsky Administrative Okrug, and outer parts of the Western Administrative Okrug

New Moscow (Russian: Новая Москва, romanized: Novaya Moskva) or Greater Moscow are territories that were transferred to the Russian capital Moscow in 2012 in the course of the largest project to expand the territory of Moscow in the entire history of the administrative-territorial division of the city. The main goals of the project are to dismantle the traditional monocentric structure of the Moscow agglomeration, as well as streamline urban zoning, giving the newly transferred territories a distinct administrative and governmental specialization.

== Politics ==
New Moscow is a part of the New Moscow constituency of the State Duma, as well as the 38th and 39th constituencies of the Moscow City Duma.
