= Zapadny, Republic of Bashkortostan =

Zapadny Западный
- Village
- Location within Bashkortostan Location within Russia
- Coordinates: 54°47′N 55°08′E
- Country: Russia
- Region: Bashkortostan
- District: Blagovarsky District
- Time zone: UTC+5:00

Zapadny (Russian: Западный) is a rural locality (a village) in Kashkalashinsky Selsoviet, Blagovarsky District, Bashkortostan, Russia. The population was 256 as of 2010. There are 6 streets.

== Geography ==
Zapadny is located 27 km northeast of Yazykovo (the district's administrative centre) by road. Vostochny is the nearest rural locality.
