= Krylatskoye District =

Krylatskoye District район Крылатское (Russian)
- District
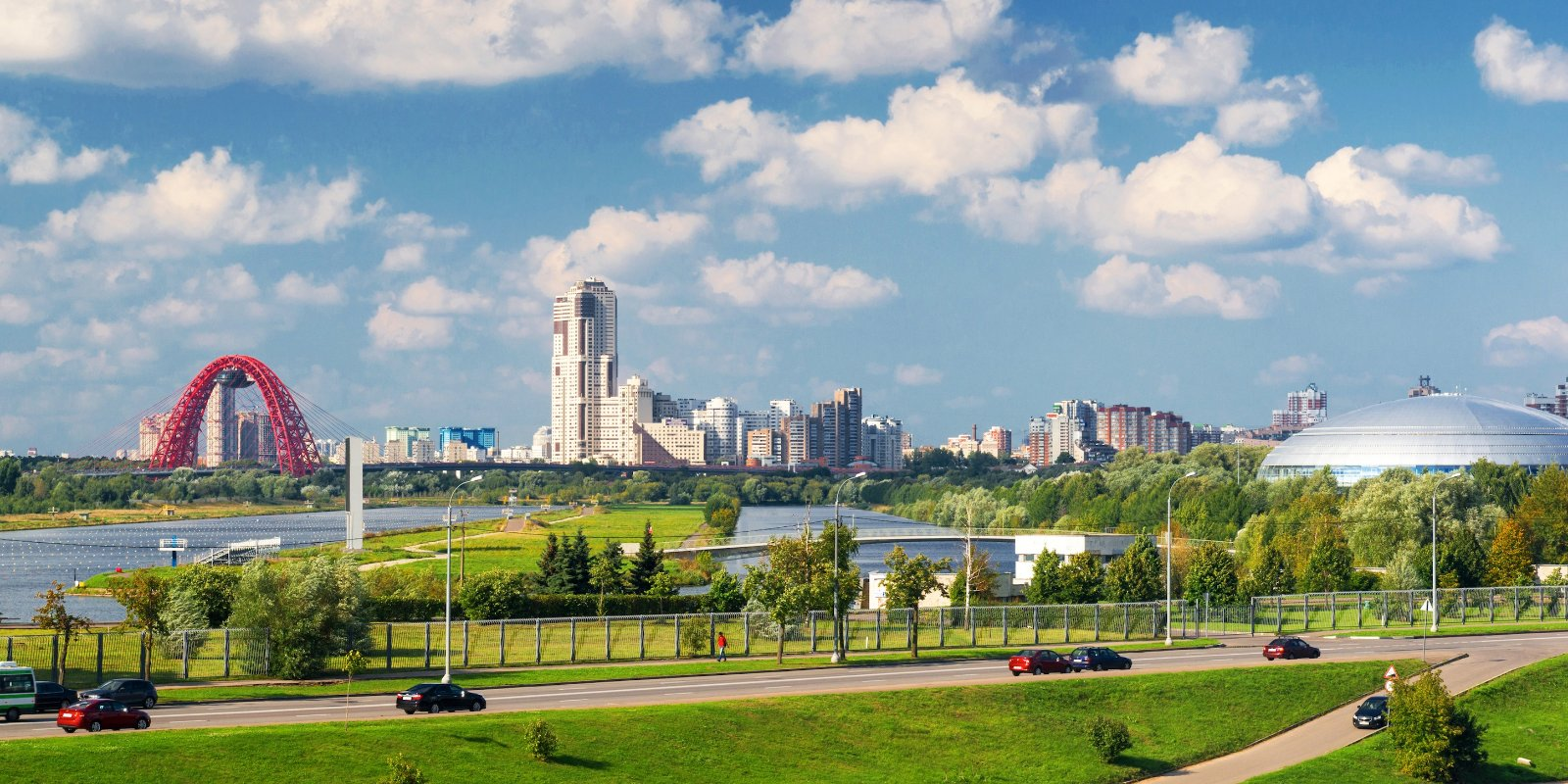

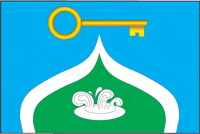
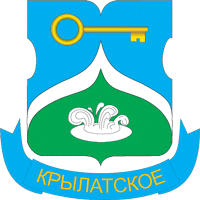
- Flag Coat of arms
- Location of Krylatskoye District in Moscow
- Coordinates: 55°45′N 37°25′E
- Country: Russia
- Federal subject: Federal city of Moscow

Area
  - Total: 12.0446 km^{2} (4.6504 sq mi)

Population (2010 Census)
  - Total: 78,509
  - Estimate (2013): 80,979
  - Density: 6,518.2/km^{2} (16,882/sq mi)

Municipal structure
  - Municipally incorporated as: Krylatskoye Municipal Okrug
- Time zone: UTC+
- OKTMO ID: 45319000
- Website: http://krylatskoe.mos.ru

Population of Krylatskoye District
- 2010 Census: 78,509
- 2002 Census: 76,261

Krylatskoye District (Russian: райо́н Крыла́тское) is a territorial division (a district, or raion) in Western Administrative Okrug, one of the 125 in the federal city of Moscow, Russia. It is located in the west of the federal city. The area of the district is 12.0446 square kilometers (4.6504 sq mi). As of the 2010 Census, the total population of the district was 78,509.

== Municipal status ==
As a municipal division, the district is incorporated as Krylatskoye Municipal Okrug.

=== Tatarovo ===
The old village of Tatarovo was first mentioned in the spiritual charter of the Grand Duke of Moscow Vasily Dmitrievich in 1417-1423. After the construction of Moscow Ring Road in 1960 it became part of Moscow. The village existed until 1980, when, in connection with the upcoming Olympics-80, the entire population (about 200 houses) was resettled in various areas of Moscow.

== Economy ==
The offices of Intel and Microsoft are located in Krylatskoye District. Also Raiffeisen bank has an office in Krilatskoe District.

== Education ==
International School of Moscow has its Krylatskoe Campus in the district.
