= Troitsk, Moscow =

Troitsk Троицк
- Town
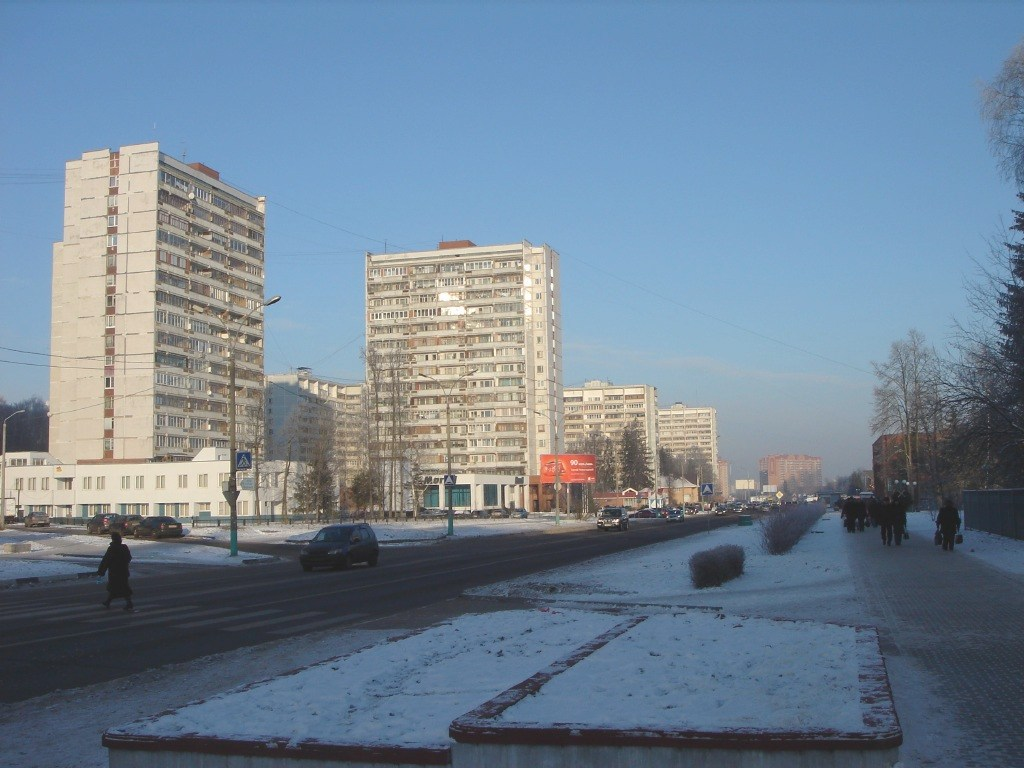
- Oktyabrsky Avenue in wintertime

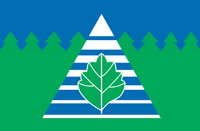
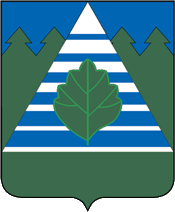
- Flag Coat of arms
- Troitsk Settlement within the federal city of Moscow
- Interactive map of Troitsk
- Location of Troitsk Troitsk (Moscow)
- Coordinates: 55°29′29″N 37°18′33″E
- Country: Russia
- Federal subject: Moscow
- First mentioned: 1646
- Town status since: 1977
- Elevation: 175 m (574 ft)

Population (2010 Census)
  - Total: 39,873
  - Estimate (2024): 71,615 (+79.6%)

Administrative status
  - Subordinated to: Troitsky Administrative Okrug
- Time zone: UTC+
- OKTMO ID: 45931000

Troitsk (Russian: Тро́ицк) is a town in Troitsky Administrative Okrug of the federal city of Moscow, Russia, located on the Desna River 37 kilometers (23 mi) southwest from the center of Moscow on the Kaluzhskoye Highway. Population: 39,873 (2010 Census); 32,653 (2002 Census); 29,301 (1989 Soviet census).

== History ==
Troitsk was first mentioned in 1646 as a settlement of Troitskoye. It was renamed Troitsk and granted town status in 1977. Until 1 July 2012 it was a part of Moscow Oblast but was transferred to Moscow's jurisdiction along with other territories in the southwest.

== Administrative and municipal status ==
On 1 July 2012 Troitsk was transferred to the city of Moscow and became a part of the newly-established Troitsky Administrative Okrug.

Prior to the transfer, within the framework of administrative divisions, it was incorporated as Troitsk Town Under Oblast Jurisdiction—an administrative unit with the status equal to that of the districts. As a municipal division, Troitsk Town Under Oblast Jurisdiction was incorporated as Troitsk Urban Okrug.

== Research ==
It is home of a number of research institutes of the Russian Academy of Sciences, including:

- Institute for Nuclear Research
- Pushkov Institute of Terrestrial Magnetism, Ionosphere and Radio Wave Propagation of the Russian Academy of Sciences, IZMIRAN
- Institute for High Pressure Physics Russian Academy of Sciences
- Institute for Spectroscopy of the Russian Academy of Sciences
- Technological Institute for Superhard and Novel Carbon Materials
- Troitsk Institute of Innovative and Thermonuclear Research
- Branch of Lebedev Physical Institute
- Branch of the A. M. Prokhorov General Physics Institute of the Russian Academy of Sciences
