= Russian Democratic Reform Movement =

Russian Democratic Reform Movement Российское движение демократических реформ
- Abbreviation: RDRM (English); RDDR (Russian)
- Leader: Gavriil Popov; Anatoly Sobchak
- Founders: Alexander Yakovlev; Eduard Shevardnadze; Gavriil Popov; Arkady Volsky; Anatoly Sobchak
- Founded: 1991
- Newspaper: Vestnik RDDR
- Ideology: Liberal democracy Federalism; Pro-CIS
- Political position: Center
- Slogan: "Choose those you trust" (Russian: "Выбирайте тех, кому доверяете")

The Russian Democratic Reform Movement (Russian: Российское движение демократических реформ, romanized: Rossiyskoye dvizheniye demokraticheskikh reform, RDDR) was a political party in Russia.

== History ==
The party was established in 1991 by Alexander Yakovlev, Arkady Volsky, Anatoly Sobchak, Eduard Shevardnadze and Gavriil Kharitonovich Popov. In the 1993 parliamentary elections it received 4% of the proportional representation vote, failing to cross the electoral threshold. However, it won eight constituency seats in the State Duma.

It did not contest any further elections.

== Electoral history ==
=== Federal parliamentary elections ===
Election	Leader	Votes	%	Seats	+/–	Rank	Coalition	Government
1993	Anatoly Sobchak	2,191,505	4.08	4 / 450		9th	–	Opposition
1995	Gavriil Popov	88,642	0.13	0 / 450	▼4	▼34th	Social Democrats (RDDR–SDS–MSDR)	Extra-parliamentary
