= Yevgeni Gerasimov (actor) =

Russian actor (born 1951)

- Евгений Герасимов
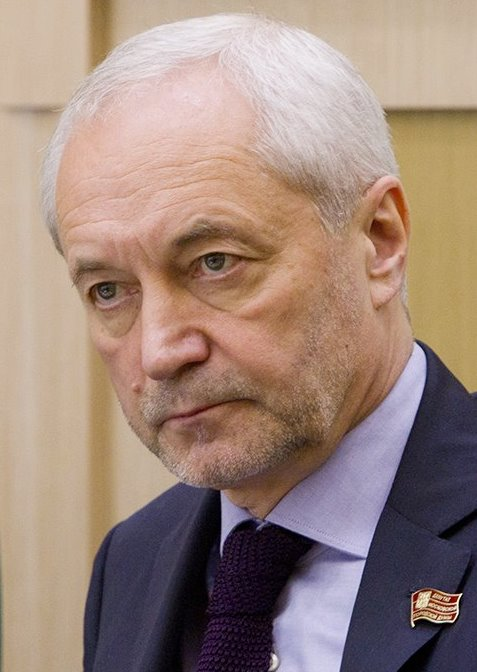
- Gerasimov in 2013

Member of the Moscow City Duma
- In office 16 December 2001 – Incumbent

Personal details
- Born: February 25, 1951 (age 75) Moscow, Soviet Union
- Party: United Russia
- Education: Boris Shchukin Theatre Institute

Yevgeni Vladimirovich Gerasimov (Russian: Евге́ний Влади́мирович Гера́симов; born 25 February 1951) is a Soviet and Russian theater and film actor, film director, people's artist of the Russian Federation (1994) and a Moscow City Duma deputy from the United Russia party.

He is most known for his part in the television series Guest from the Future.
