= Fili-Davydkovo District =

- District
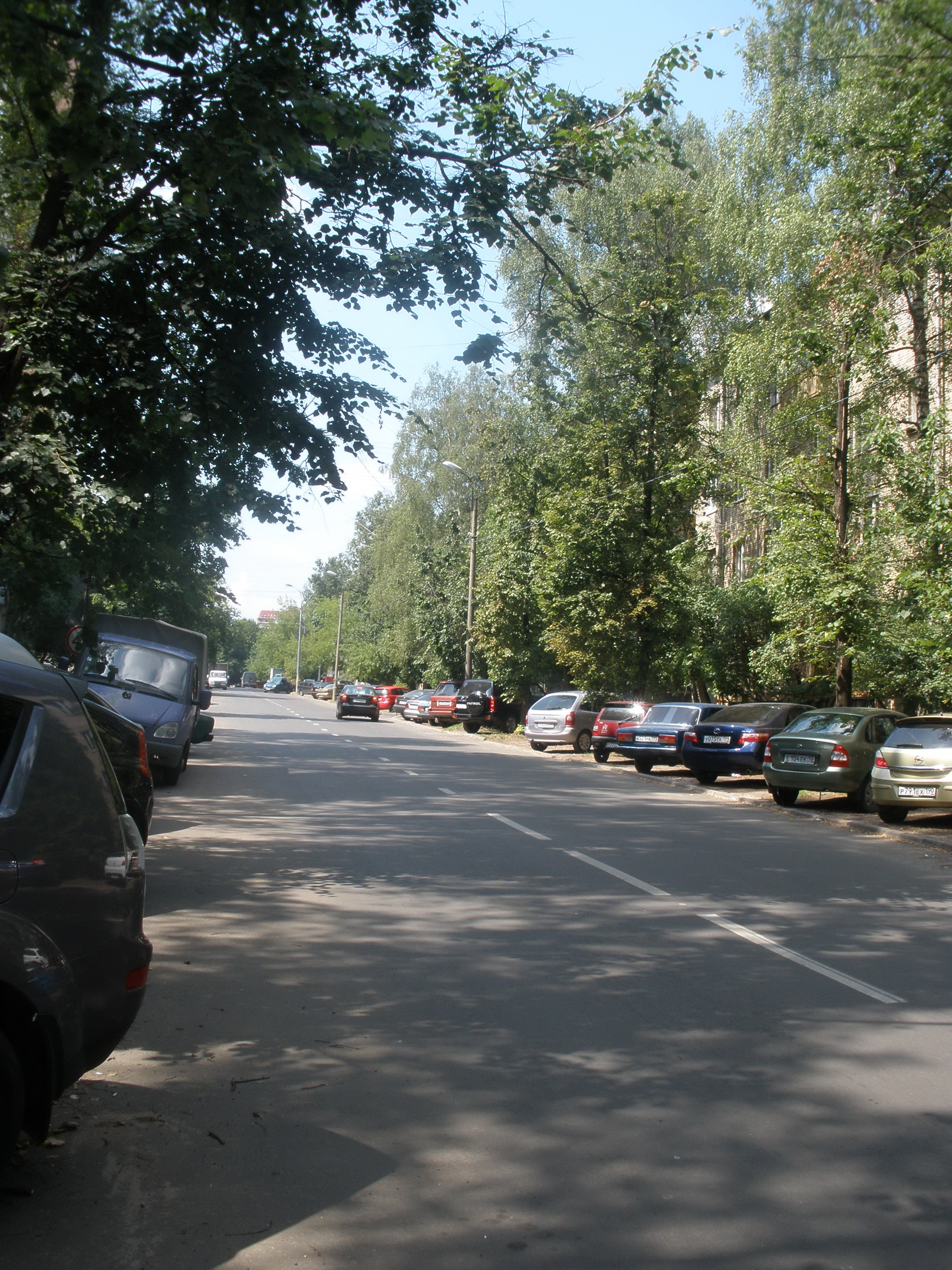
- Vatutina Street, Fili-Davydkovo District

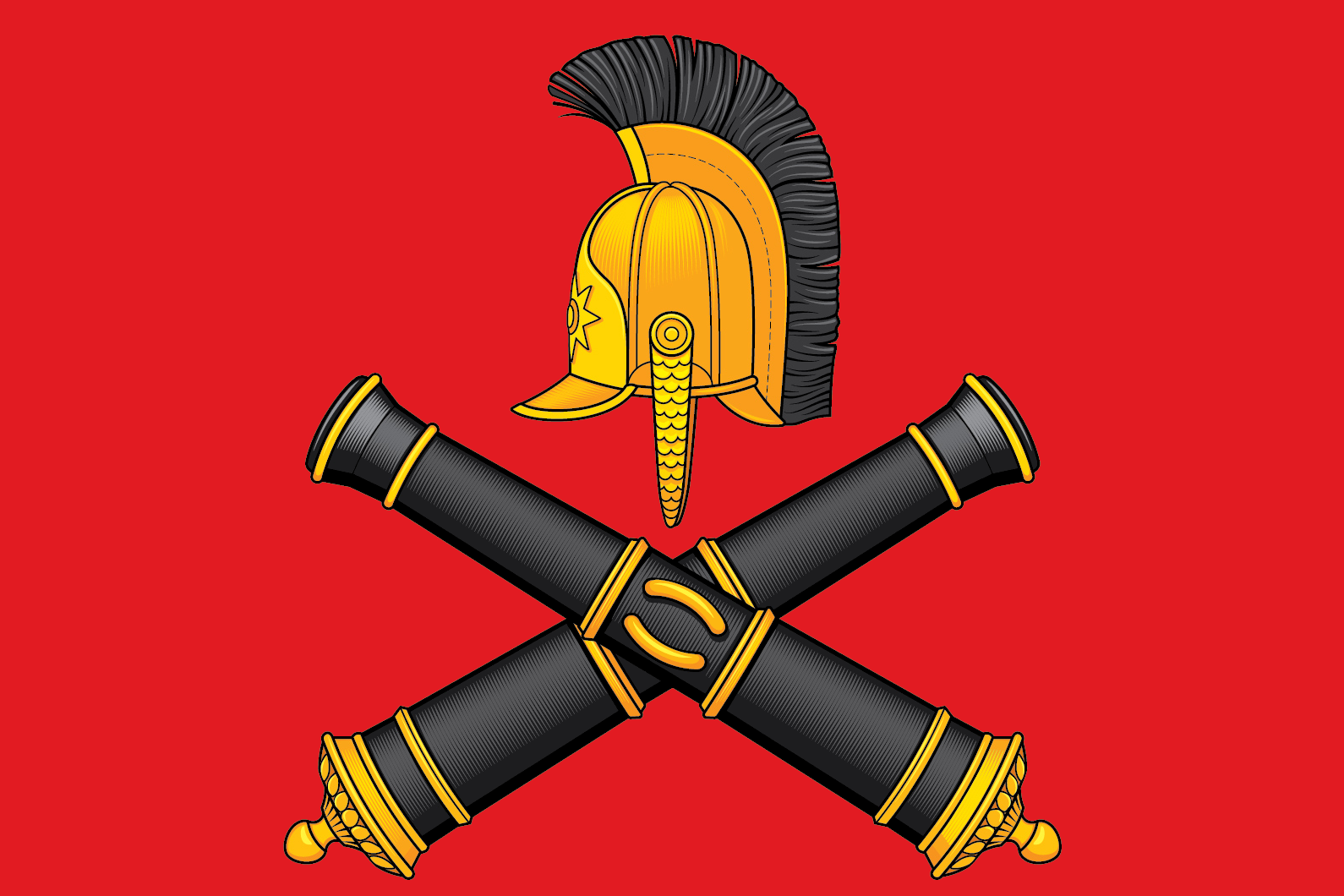
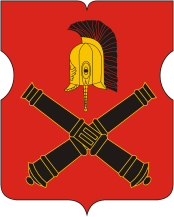
- Flag Coat of arms
- Location of Fili-Davydkovo District on the map of Moscow
- Coordinates: 55°43′40″N 37°28′02″E
- Country: Russia
- Federal subject: Moscow
- Established: 5 July 1995

Area
  - Total: 6.9571 km^{2} (2.6862 sq mi)
- Time zone: UTC+
- OKTMO ID: 45329000
- Website: http://fili-davyd.zao.mos.ru/

Fili-Davydkovo District (Russian: райо́н Фили-Давыдково) is an administrative district (raion) of Western Administrative Okrug, and one of the 125 raions of Moscow, Russia.

It is named after the former villages Fili and Davydkovo.

== See also ==
- Administrative divisions of Moscow
