= Kuntsevo District =

Kuntsevo District Кунцево
- District
- Flag Coat of arms
- Location of Kuntsevo District in Moscow
- Coordinates: 55°44′N 37°26′E
- Country: Russia
- Federal subject: Moscow
- Established: 1960

Population (2010 Census)
  - Total: 142,497
  - Urban: 100%
  - Rural: 0%
- Time zone: UTC+3 (MSK)
- OKTMO ID: 45320000
- Website: http://www.kuntsevo.org/

Kúntsevo (Russian: Ку́нцево) is a district in Western Administrative Okrug of the federal city of Moscow, Russia. Population: 142,497 (2010 Census); 125,100 (2002 Census).

== History ==
In the 18th century, a palace and a park were built; they were often visited by the Empress Catherine II. Kuntsevo is the site of the Church of Theotokos Orans. In the 19th century, Kuntsevo became a summer resort for the Muscovites. A summer theater was opened in 1890. Artists and writers lived and worked in Kuntsevo; among them Nikolay Karamzin, Ivan Turgenev, Vasily Perov, and Ivan Kramskoy.

Kuntsevo became a town in its own right in 1926. In 1960, it became a part of Moscow. Now a district of Moscow, it contains many factories, residential areas, and has a well-connected infrastructure. Kuntsevo is reported to be the location of the Strategic Missile Command center.

== Transport ==
The district has two metro stations: Molodyozhnaya on the Arbatsko-Pokrovskaya Line and Kuntsevskaya on the Arbatsko-Pokrovskaya and the Filevskaya Line. Strogino metro station in neighboring Strogino District serves parts of the Myakinino area of the Kuntsevo district.

The Myakinino area is also served by bus number 638 that goes from to Shchukinskaya metro station via Strogino. From Rublevo buses:

- 127 Rublevo – Kotsyubyns'kogo Street (to Molodyozhnaya metro station)
- 129 Myakinino – Carpool General Staff (to Krylatskoye metro station )
- 626 3rd district Strogina – Molodyozhnaya metro station

Part of the southern boundary of the district is the Moscow to Smolensk Main Line main railway toward Belarus. Commuter stations on this line connect with the Belorussky railway station in Moscow. Heading west on the mainline, commuter trains go to Golitsyno, Moscow Oblast, Kubinka and Mozhaysk. The branch line to Usovo and the freight-only line to Rublevo leave the mainline in Kuntsevo district at Rabochiy Posolok.

== Kuntsevo Dacha ==
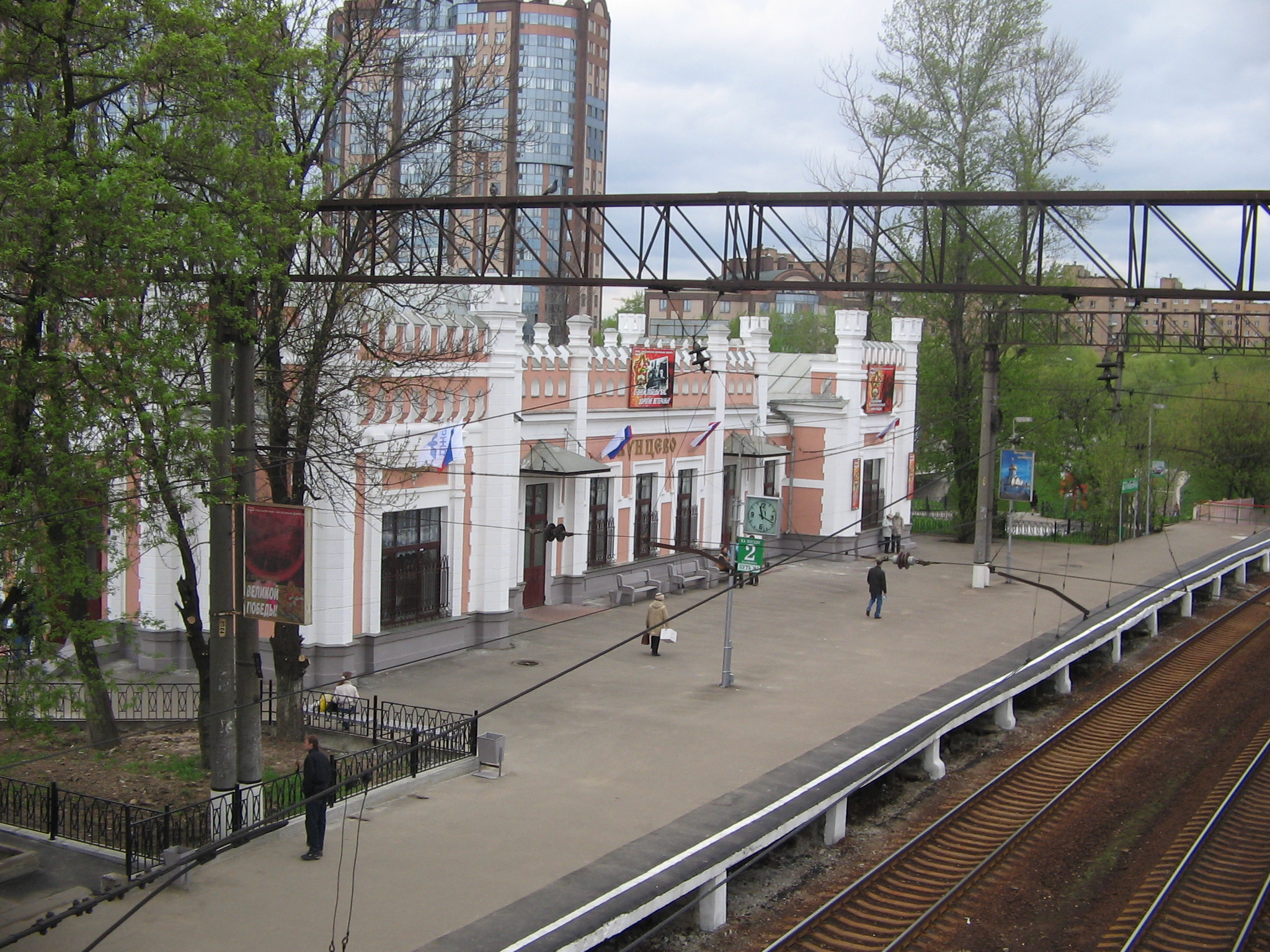
The Kuntsevo railway station

Soviet leaders started to settle in Kuntsevo in the 1920s. Joseph Stalin instructed his architect, Miron Merzhanov, to build him a dacha on the bank of the Moskva River and moved there in 1934. With his move other members of the Soviet elite had their dachas built in the surroundings. Stalin conducted much of his business from his Blizhnyaya Dacha (Ближняя дача) ("nearby dacha"). It was heavily protected and included a double-perimeter fence, camouflaged 30-millimeter antiaircraft guns, and a security force of three hundred NKVD special troops. Stalin died at the dacha on March 5, 1953.

== See also ==
- Kuntsevo Cemetery
- Central Clinical Hospital
