= Ochakovo-Matveyevskoye District =

Ochakovo-Matveevskoe район Очаково-Матвевское (Russian)
- District
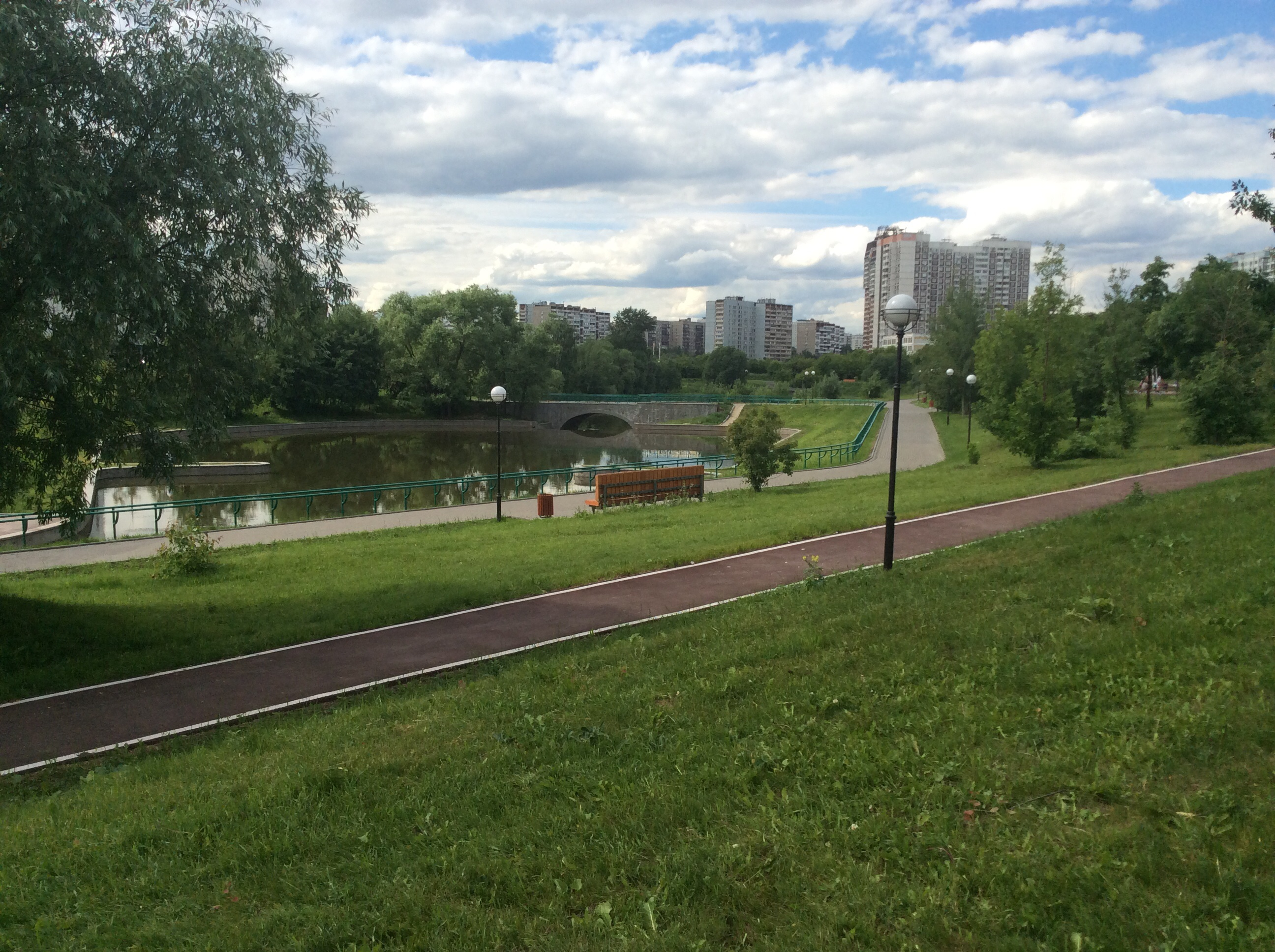
- Nikulpool, Ochakovo-Matveyevskoye District

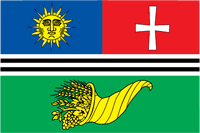
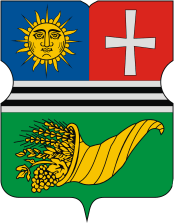
- Flag Coat of arms
- Location of Ochakovo-Matveevskoe on the map of Moscow
- Coordinates: 55°41′39″N 37°26′38″E
- Country: Russia
- Federal subject: Moscow

Area
  - Total: 17.544 km^{2} (6.774 sq mi)

Population
  - Estimate (2022): 129,002
- Time zone: UTC+
- OKTMO ID: 45323000
- Website: http://ochakovo.mos.ru/

Ochakovo-Matveevskoe (Russian: Очаково-Матвеевское райо́н) is an administrative district (raion) of Western Administrative Okrug, and one of the 125 raions of Moscow, Russia. The area of the district is 17.5436 square kilometers (6.7736 sq mi). Population: 129,002 (2022 est.). It was formed in 1997 through merging of the Ochakovo and Matveevskoe districts.

== See also ==
- Administrative divisions of Moscow
