= Novo-Peredelkino District =

- District
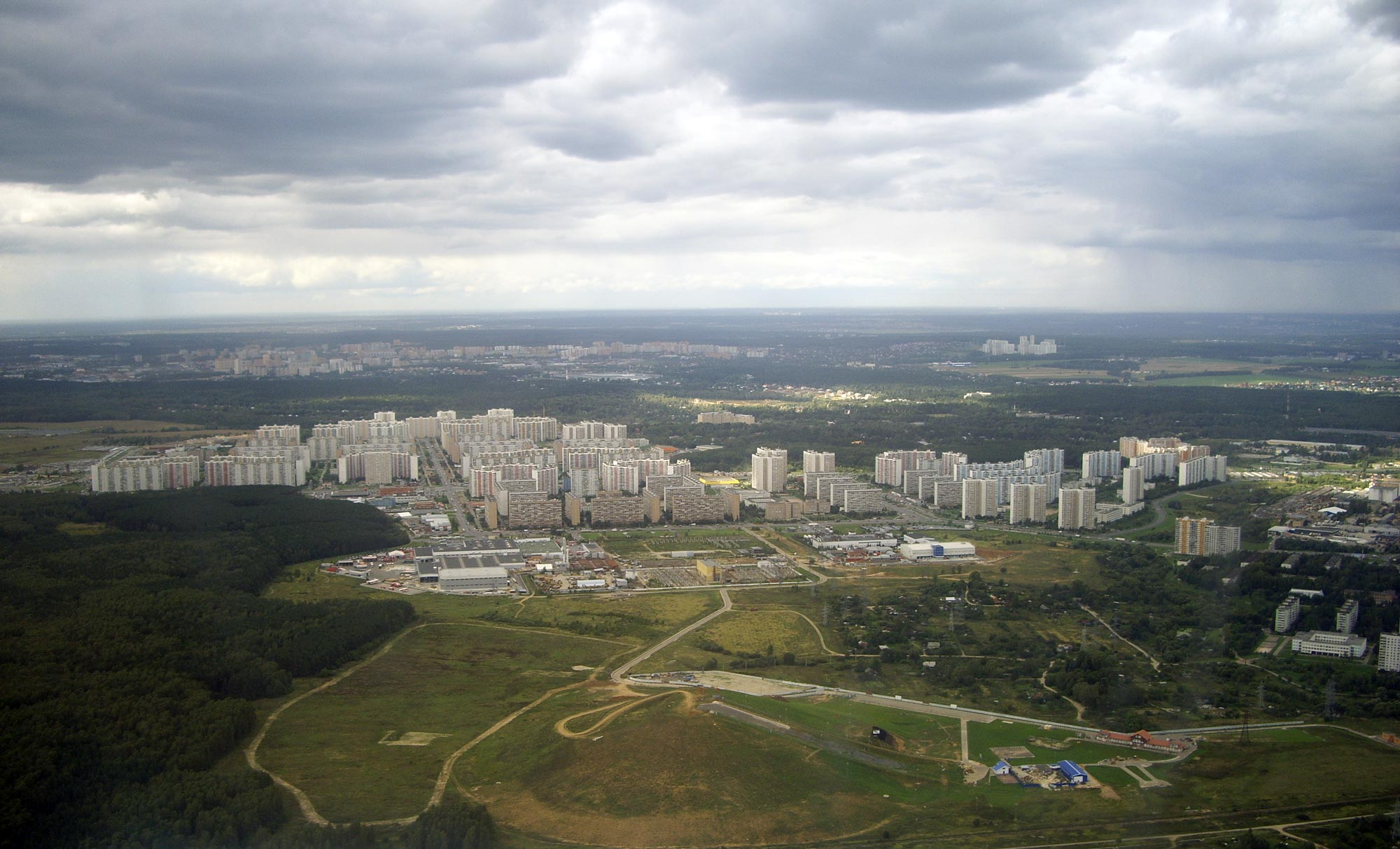
- Novo peredelkino from the air

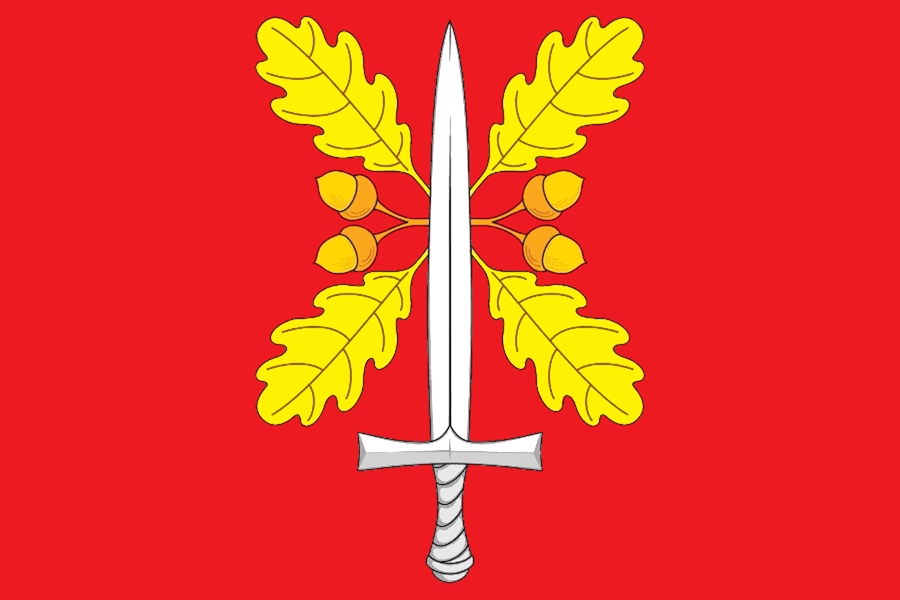
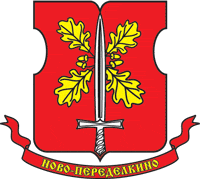
- Flag Coat of arms
- Location of Novo-Peredelkino District on the map of Moscow
- Coordinates: 55°38′30″N 37°21′30″E
- Country: Russia
- Federal subject: Moscow
- Time zone: UTC+
- OKTMO ID: 45322000
- Website: http://novo-peredelkino.mos.ru/

Novo-Peredelkino District (Russian: Ново-Переделкино райо́н) is an administrative district (raion) of Western Administrative Okrug, and one of the 125 raions of Moscow, Russia.

== See also ==
- Administrative divisions of Moscow
