= Solntsevo District =

Solntsevo District район Солнцево (Russian)
- District
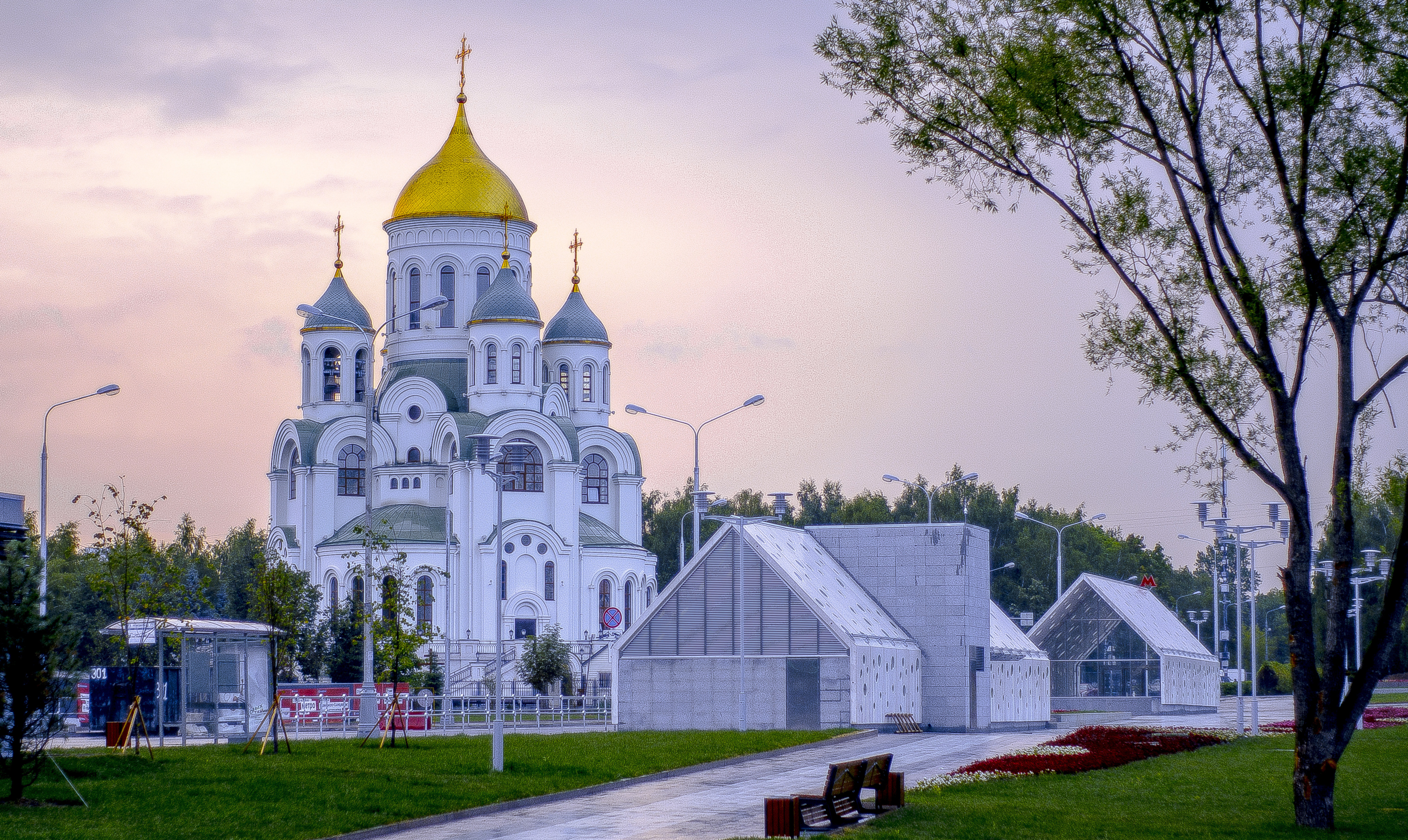

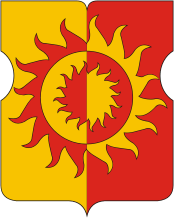
- Flag Coat of arms
- Location of Solntsevo District in Moscow
- Coordinates: 55°39′13″N 37°24′07″E
- Country: Russia
- Federal subject: Moscow

Area
  - Total: 11.2879 km^{2} (4.3583 sq mi)

Population (2010 Census)
  - Total: 113,959
  - Estimate (2016): 122,400
  - Density: 10,095.7/km^{2} (26,147.7/sq mi)
  - Urban: 100%
  - Rural: 0%
- Time zone: UTC+
- OKTMO ID: 45326000
- Website: http://solntsevo.mos.ru/

Solntsevo District (Russian: райо́н Со́лнцево) is a district of Western Administrative Okrug of the federal city of Moscow, Russia. The area of the district is 11.2879 square kilometres (4.3583 sq mi). Population: 122,400 (2016), 113,959 (2010 census); 85,642 (2002 census).

== History ==
It originated in 1938 as a dacha settlement and was named after the Russian word for Sun ("солнце, solntse). It used to be a separate town from 1971. Since May 1984 it has been included into Moscow. Former prime minister Mikhail Kasyanov and 2008 presidential election candidate Andrey Bogdanov are natives of Solntsevo.

The organized crime group Solntsevskaya Bratva based its name upon Solntsevo District.
