= Prospekt Vernadskogo District =

- District
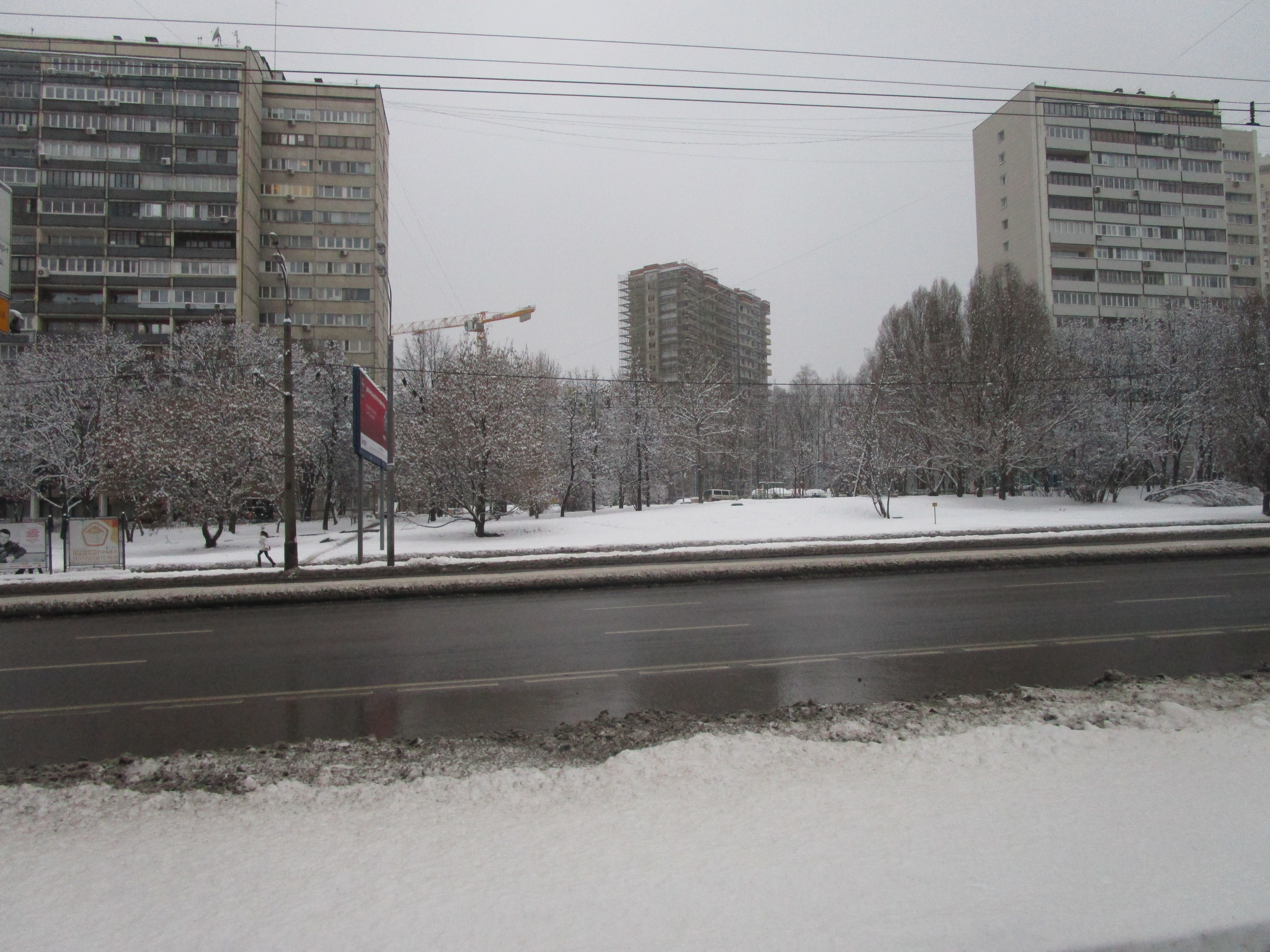
- Vernadskogo prospekt in winter

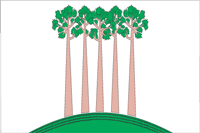
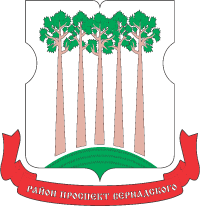
- Flag Coat of arms
- Location of Prospekt Vernadskogo District on the map of Moscow
- Coordinates: 55°40′37″N 37°30′01″E
- Country: Russia
- Federal subject: Moscow

Area
  - Total: 4.6514 km^{2} (1.7959 sq mi)

Population
  - Estimate (2017): 62,000
- Time zone: UTC+
- OKTMO ID: 45324000
- Website: http://vernadskogo.mos.ru/

Prospekt Vernadskogo District (Russian: Проспект Вернадского райо́н) is an administrative district (raion) of Western Administrative Okrug, and one of the 125 raions of Moscow, Russia. The area of the district is 4.6154 square kilometers (1.7820 sq mi). Population: 62,000 (2017 est.),

== History ==
The district is named for Vladimir Vernadsky, the famed mineralogist and geochemist. In the 14th century, the area was a forested landholding of the Moscow metropolitans, known for its pine trees and associated shipbuilding. After a plague in 1655, Belarusians moved into the area. The population was only 600 at the start of the 20th century, but residential building began in earnest in the 1970s when large avenues and the subway reached the district. Until 1991, the district was known as Gagarinsky District, after which the current name was adopted.

The Federal Security Service's anti-terrorism and analytical center is located in Prospekt Vernadskogo.

== Education ==
In the district is the main campus of the Moscow State Institute of International Relations (MGIMO), one of the most exclusive institutions of higher education in Russia. Moscow International Prescool, an international kindergarten, is also situated in Prospekt Vernadskogo district.

== See also ==
- Administrative divisions of Moscow
