= Vnukovo District =

- District
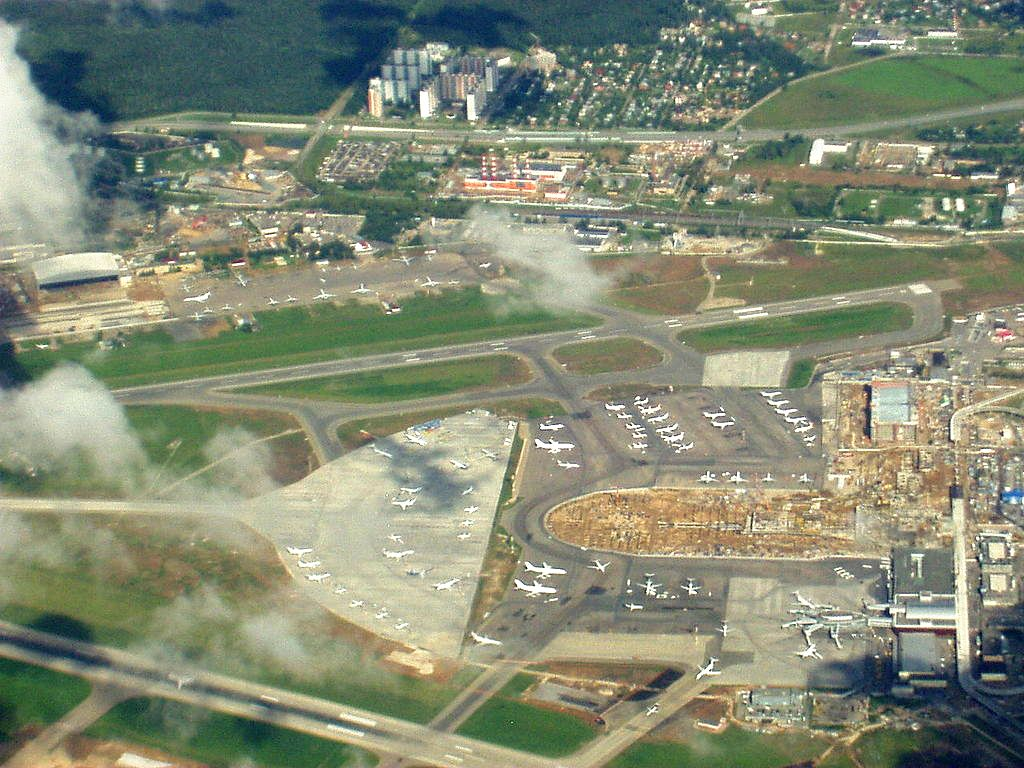
- Vnukovo airport under renovation aerial view, Vnukovo District

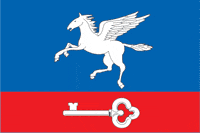
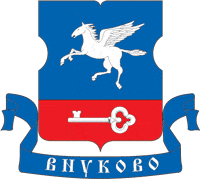
- Flag Coat of arms
- Location of Vnukovo District on the map of Moscow
- Coordinates: 55°36′N 37°17′E
- Country: Russia
- Federal subject: Moscow

Area
  - Total: 16.912 km^{2} (6.530 sq mi)

Population
  - Estimate (2017): 20,100
- Time zone: UTC+
- OKTMO ID: 45317000
- Website: http://vnukovo.mos.ru/

Vnukovo District (Russian: район Внуково) is an administrative district (raion) of Western Administrative Okrug, and one of the 125 raions of Moscow, Russia. Most of the district is occupied by Vnukovo International Airport, a small adjacent residential area, and a separate residential micro-district. The area of the district is 16.912 square kilometers (6.530 sq mi), and its population was estimated at 20,100 as of 2017.

== Economy ==
The economy of the district is dominated by Vnukovo International Airport. The district is 11 km southwest of the Moscow Ring Road, and 30 km southwest of the Moscow city center. Red Wings Airlines has its head office in the okrug.

== See also ==
- Administrative divisions of Moscow
