= Troparyovo-Nikulino District =

- District
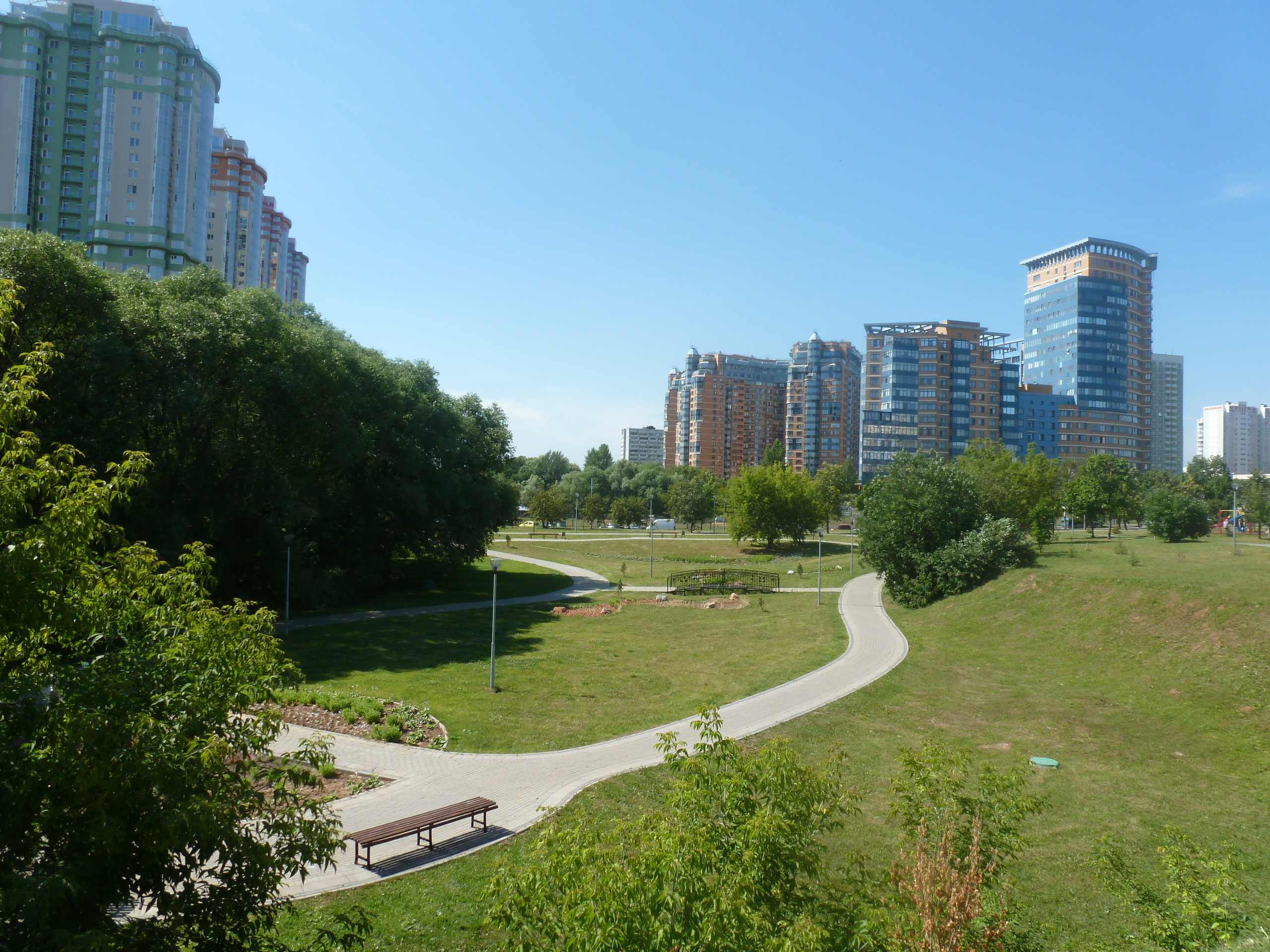
- Park in Troparyovo-Nikulino District

- Flag Coat of arms
- Location of Troparyovo-Nikulino District on the map of Moscow
- Coordinates: 55°40′N 37°28′E
- Country: Russia
- Federal subject: Moscow

Area
  - Total: 11.26 km^{2} (4.35 sq mi)

Population
  - Estimate: 119,000
- Time zone: UTC+
- OKTMO ID: 45327000
- Website: http://troparevo-nikulino.mos.ru/

Troparyovo-Nikulino District is an administrative district (raion) at the southern edge of Western Administrative Okrug, and one of the 125 raions of Moscow, Russia. The western border is the Moscow Ring Road, and the southern border is Leninsky Prospekt. The area of the district is 11.26 square kilometers (4.35 sq mi). Population: 119,000 (2016 est.)

== Education ==
The German School Moscow is located in Troparyovo-Nikulino District.

Other education organizations:

- Moscow State University of Fine Chemical Technologies
- Moscow State Institute of Radio Engineering, Electronics and Automation
- Russian Presidential Academy of National Economy and Public Administration

== Famous buildings ==
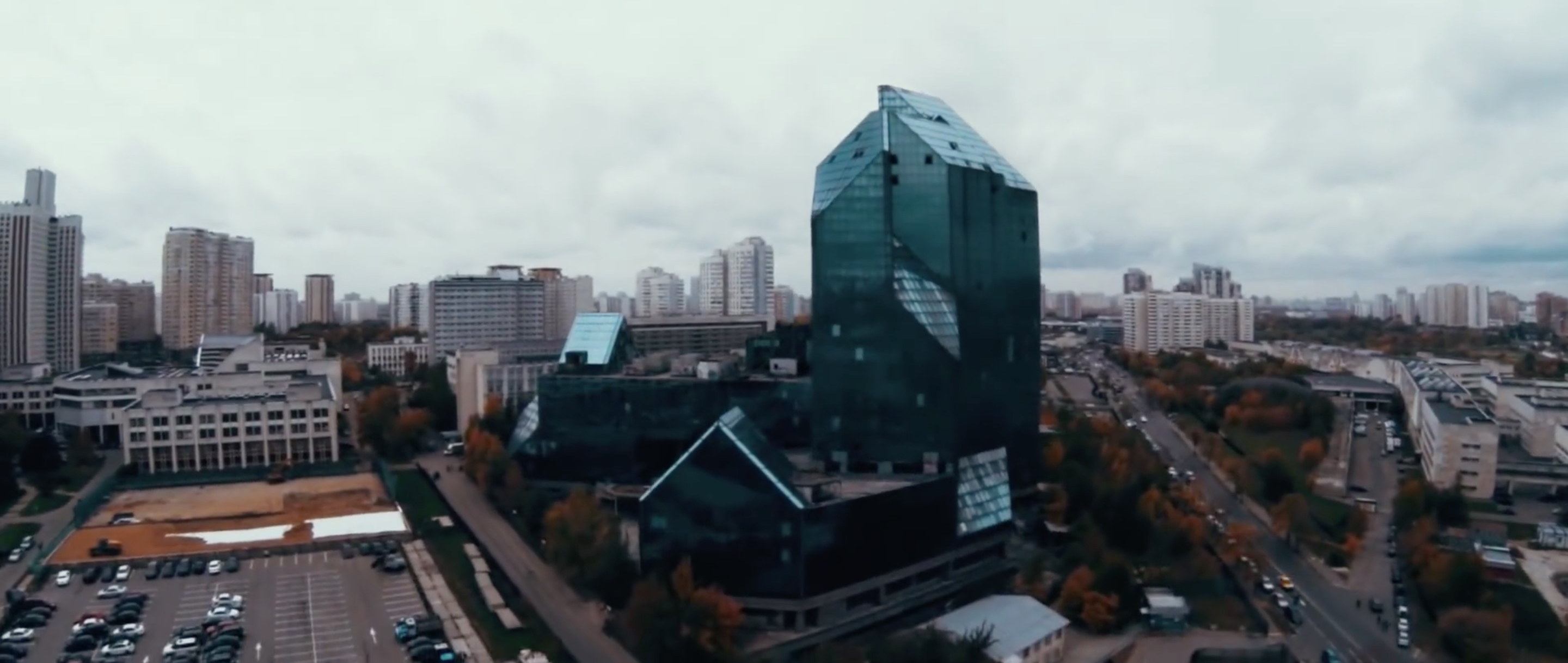
Unfinished business center «Zenit» (1991–1995), object of industrial tourism

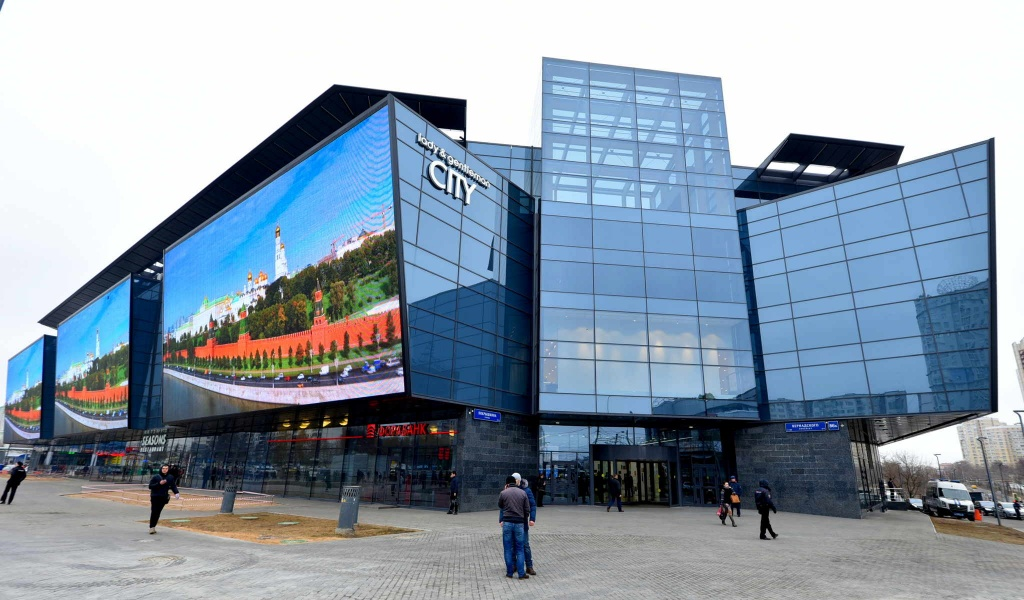
Shopping mall "Avenue South West"

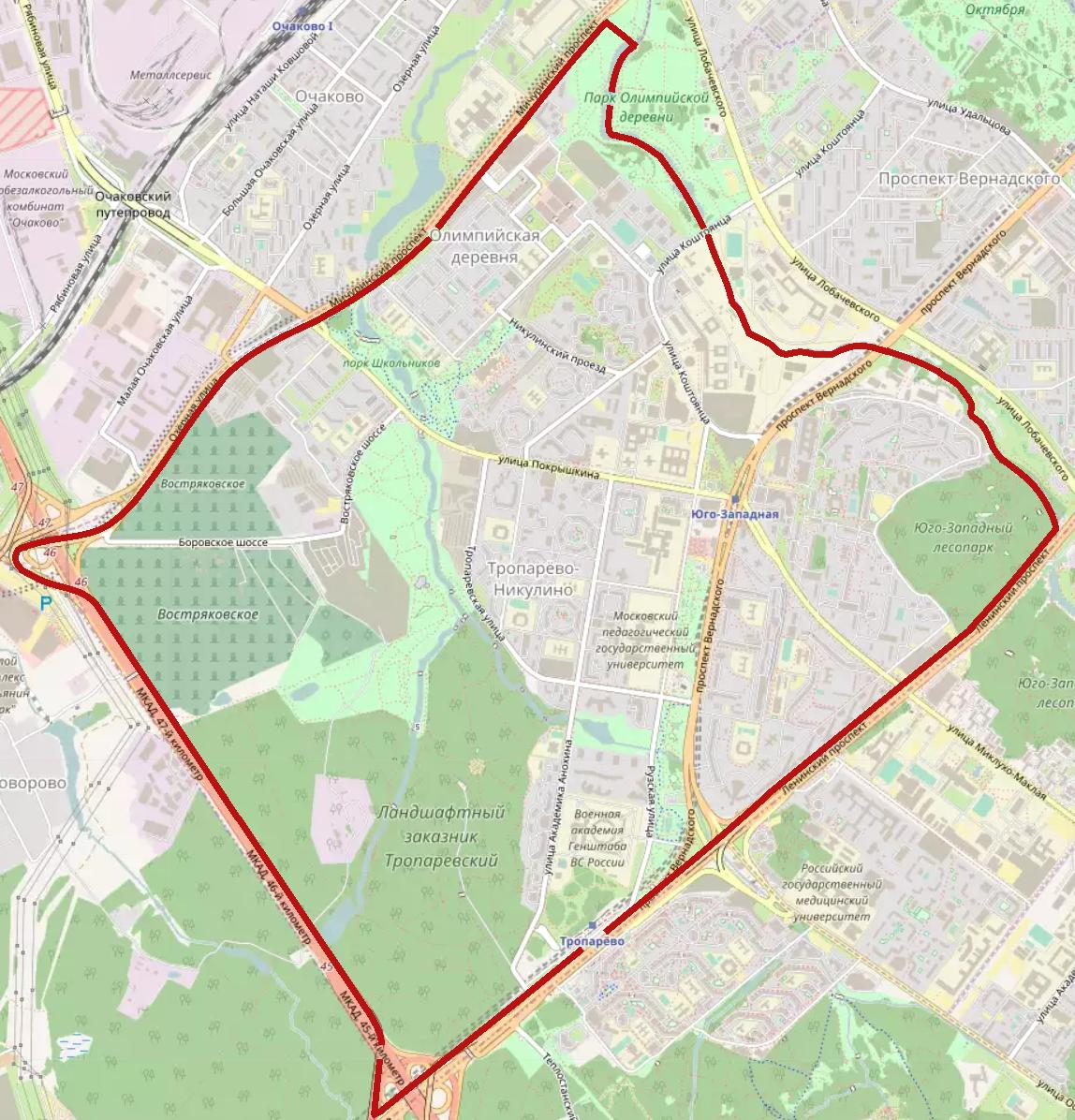
Borders of Troparyovo-Nikulin District, from OpenStreetMap

== See also ==
- Administrative divisions of Moscow
