= Western Administrative Okrug =

Western Administrative Okrug Западный административный округ
- Administrative okrug of Moscow
- Flag Coat of arms
- Western Administrative Okrug in Moscow
- Coordinates: 55°43′N 37°29′E
- Country: Russia
- Federal city: Moscow
- Established: 1991
- Districts: 12

Government
  - Prefect: Alexey Alexandrov

Area
  - Total: 153.0 km^{2} (59.1 sq mi)

Population (2021 Census)
  - Total: 1,383,853
- Website: http://zao.mos.ru

Western Administrative Okrug (Russian: За́падный администрати́вный о́круг, romanized: Zapadny administrativny okrug), or Zapadny Administrativny Okrug, is one of the twelve high-level territorial divisions (administrative okrugs) of the federal city of Moscow, Russia. As of the 2010 Census, its population was 1,285,914, up from 1,049,104 recorded during the 2002 Census.

== Territorial divisions ==
The administrative okrug comprises the following thirteen districts:

- Dorogomilovo
- Filyovsky Park
- Fili-Davydkovo
- Krylatskoye
- Kuntsevo
- Mozhaysky
- Novo-Peredelkino
- Ochakovo-Matveyevskoye
- Prospekt Vernadskogo
- Ramenki
- Solntsevo
- Troparyovo-Nikulino
- Vnukovo

== Economy ==
The head office of AirBridgeCargo Airlines and offices of Intel are located in the Krylatsky Hills Business Park in Krylatskoye District of the administrative okrug. Red Wings Airlines has its head office in Vnukovo District.

== Education ==
Moscow International Prescool, an international kindergarten, is situated in Prospekt Vernadskogo District.

The German School Moscow is located in Troparyovo-Nikulino District of the administrative okrug.

Moscow Korean School (MKS; 모스크바한국학교), a South Korean international school, is within Mozhaysky District.

International School of Moscow has its Krylatskoe Campus in the Krylatskoye District.

== Sister cities ==
- Wetzlar, Hesse, Germany
