= Cheryomushki constituency =

Russian legislative constituency

Cheryomushki single-member constituency
- Constituency of the Russian State Duma

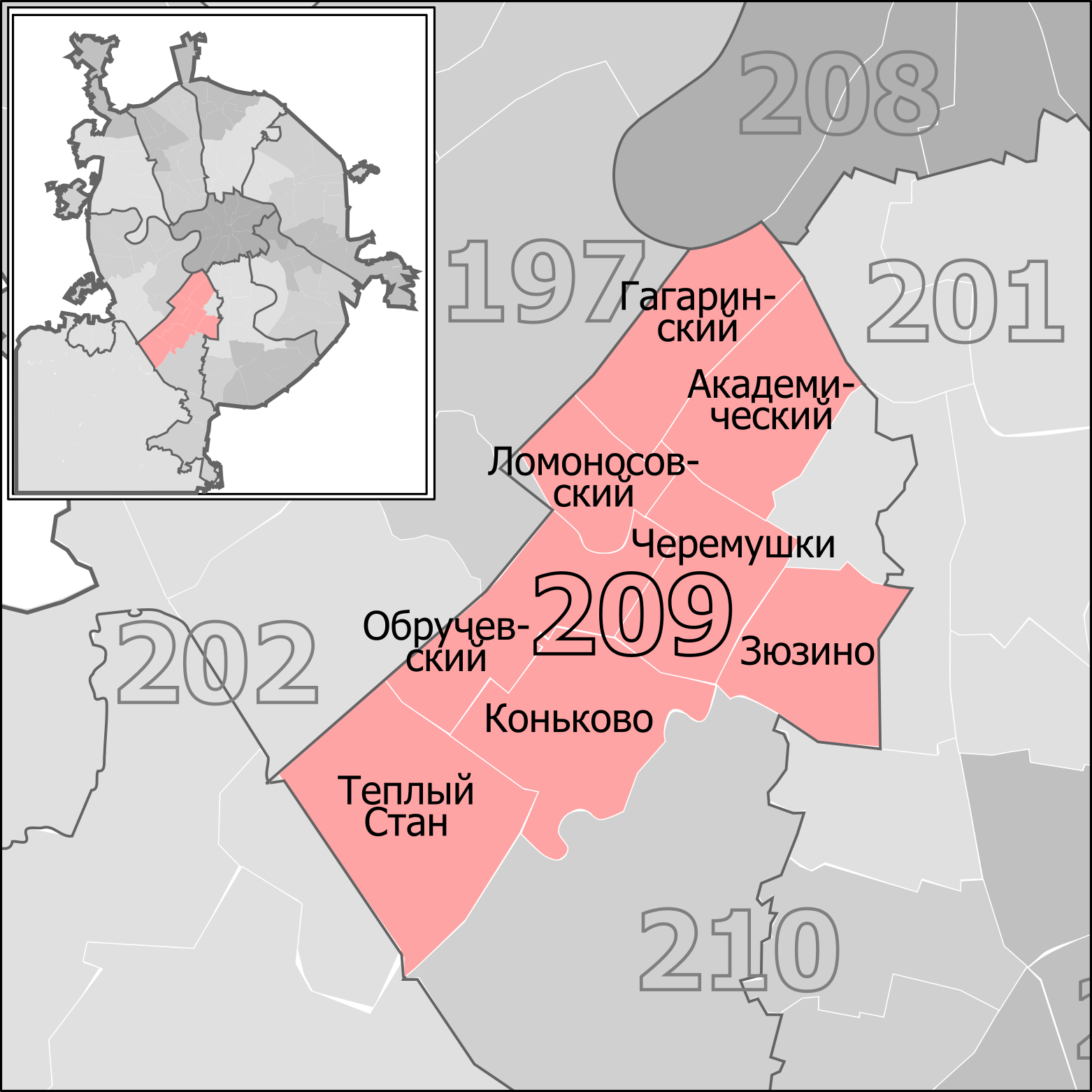
- Constituency boundaries since 2016
- Deputy: Dmitry Nazarov; United Russia
- Federal subject: Moscow
- Districts: South-Western AO (Akademichesky, Cheryomushki, Gagarinsky, Konkovo, Lomonosovsky, Obruchevsky, Tyoply Stan, Zyuzino)
- Voters: 507,715 (2026)

The Cheryomushki constituency (No.208 (Note: South-Western constituency No.204 in 1993-1995, No.203 in 1995-2007, No.209 in 2016–2026)) is a Russian legislative constituency in Moscow. The constituency covers most of South-Western Moscow, stretching along the Leninsky Avenue.

The constituency has been represented since 2026 by United Russia deputy Dmitry Nazarov, retired Medical Service podpolkovnik and cardiac surgeon, who won the open seat, succeeding one-term United Russia incumbent Aleksandr Rumyantsev.

== Boundaries ==
1993–1995 South-Western constituency: South-Western Administrative Okrug (Akademichesky District, Cheryomushki District, Konkovo District, Tyoply Stan District, Yasenevo District)
The constituency covered most of South-Western Moscow, stretching across its central portion.

1995–2003: South-Western Administrative Okrug (Akademichesky District, Cheryomushki District, Konkovo District, Kotlovka District, Tyoply Stan District, Yasenevo District)
After the 1995 redistricting the constituency was renamed "Cheryomushki constituency" and was slightly changed, gaining Kotlovka from the former Varshavsky constituency.

2003–2007: South-Western Administrative Okrug (Akademichesky District, Cheryomushki District, Konkovo District, Tyoply Stan District, Yasenevo District, Zyuzino District)
Following the 2003 redistricting the constituency was slightly altered, swapping Kotlovka for Zyuzino with Chertanovo constituency.

2016–present: South-Western Administrative Okrug (Akademichesky District, Cheryomushki District, Gagarinsky District, Konkovo District, Lomonosovsky District, Obruchevsky District, Tyoply Stan District, Zyuzino District)
The constituency was re-created for the 2016 election and retained most of its former territory, losing Yasenevo to Chertanovo constituency. This seat instead gained Gagarinsky District, Lomonosovsky District and Obruchevsky District to its west from the dissolved Universitetsky constituency.

== Members elected ==
Election	Member	Party
1993	Pavel Medvedev	Independent
1995	Pavel Medvedev	Bloc '89
1999	Pavel Medvedev	Independent
2003	Pavel Medvedev	United Russia
2007	Proportional representation - no election by constituency	
2011	Proportional representation - no election by constituency	
2016	Dmitry Morozov	United Russia
2021	Aleksandr Rumyantsev	United Russia
2026	Dmitry Nazarov	United Russia

== Election results ==
=== 1993 ===
Summary of the 12 December 1993 Russian legislative election in the South-Western constituency
Candidate	Party	Votes	%
Pavel Medvedev	Independent	50,824	22.61%
Aleksandr Ishchenko	Independent	–	16.38%
Mikhail Bocharov	Independent	–	–
Dmitry Olshansky	Party of Russian Unity and Accord	–	–
Jahan Polliyeva	Russian Democratic Reform Movement	–	–
Mikhail Prudnikov	Communist Party	–	–
Anatoly Romanov	Agrarian Party	–	–
Viktor Sheynis	Yavlinky–Boldyrev–Lukin	–	–
Viktor Ustinov	Liberal Democratic Party	–	–
Total		224,755	100%

=== 1995 ===
Summary of the 17 December 1995 Russian legislative election in the Cheryomushki constituency
Candidate	Party	Votes	%
Pavel Medvedev (incumbent)	Bloc '89	74,587	24.65%
Yuly Gusman	Independent	48,291	15.96%
Mikhail Prudnikov	Communist Party	38,763	12.81%
Vladimir Senin	Social Democrats	21,264	7.03%
Vladimir Gruzdev	Independent	19,371	6.40%
Fyodor Burlatsky	Party of Russian Unity and Accord	16,294	5.38%
Sergey Pykhtin	Congress of Russian Communities	15,329	5.07%
Mikhail Leontyev	Independent	9,593	3.17%
Sergey Vorobyov	Faith, Work, Conscience	5,413	1.79%
Dmitry Zhukov	Liberal Democratic Party	5,181	1.71%
Nikolay Kupchin	Ivan Rybkin Bloc	3,750	1.24%
Yury Yashkov (Gorny)	Independent	1,562	0.52%
Yury Tavrovsky	Independent	1,085	0.36%
against all		37,493	12.39%
Total		302,583	100%

=== 1999 ===
Summary of the 19 December 1999 Russian legislative election in the Cheryomushki constituency
Candidate	Party	Votes	%
Pavel Medvedev (incumbent)	Independent	84,511	27.10%
Vladimir Gruzdev	Independent	62,708	20.11%
Viktor Shevelukha	Communist Party	30,540	9.79%
Aleksandr Bryntsalov	Russian Socialist Party	21,254	6.81%
Pyotr Pronin	Independent	12,367	3.97%
Nikolay Bocharov	Andrey Nikolayev and Svyatoslav Fyodorov Bloc	8,489	2.72%
Yelena Makeyeva	Independent	7,570	2.43%
Vladimir Shamailov	Independent	6,869	2.20%
Rafael Mustafin	Our Home – Russia	6,141	1.97%
Yury Lebedev	Spiritual Heritage	3,845	1.23%
Ilya Kutsenko	Independent	3,266	1.05%
against all		56,442	18.10%
Total		311,886	100%

=== 2003 ===
Summary of the 7 December 2003 Russian legislative election in the Cheryomushki constituency
Candidate	Party	Votes	%
Pavel Medvedev (incumbent)	United Russia	118,711	41.65%
Vyacheslav Kovalev	Russian United Industrial Party	46,539	16.33%
Oleg Cherkovets	Communist Party	23,392	8.21%
Yury Ponomarev	Liberal Democratic Party	11,398	4.00%
Yury Orekhov	Independent	9,713	3.41%
Andrey Lutkovsky	United Russian Party Rus'	4,451	1.56%
Vladimir Leksakov	Party of Russia's Rebirth-Russian Party of Life	4,242	1.49%
against all		61,851	21.70%
Total		286,848	100%

=== 2016 ===
Summary of the 18 September 2016 Russian legislative election in the Cheryomushki constituency
Candidate	Party	Votes	%
Dmitry Morozov	United Russia	59,326	34.22%
Vladimir Rodin	Communist Party	21,946	12.66%
Yelena Rusakova	Yabloko	20,538	11.85%
Konstantinas Yankauskas	People's Freedom Party	14,244	8.22%
Sergey Vasilyev	A Just Russia	11,365	6.56%
Anton Yurikov	Liberal Democratic Party	9,811	5.66%
Sergey Stankevich	Party of Growth	8,321	4.80%
Darya Mitina	Communists of Russia	7,931	4.58%
Aleksey Petrovichev	Rodina	5,573	3.21%
Sergey Dorofeyev	The Greens	3,984	2.30%
Maria Sorokina	Patriots of Russia	3,904	2.25%
Ilya Ukhov	Civilian Power	783	0.45%
Total		173,349	100%

=== 2021 ===
Summary of the 17-19 September 2021 Russian legislative election in the Cheryomushki constituency
Candidate	Party	Votes	%
Aleksandr Rumyantsev	United Russia	81,790	34.43%
Igor Nikolayev	Yabloko	47,020	19.79%
Nikolay Volkov	Communist Party	32,292	13.59%
Maksim Chirkov	A Just Russia — For Truth	20,534	8.64%
Yury Maksimov	Liberal Democratic Party	14,397	6.06%
Daniil Shupenya	New People	13,347	5.62%
Aleksey Volkov	Communists of Russia	8,230	3.46%
Aleksandr Baklanov	Russian Party of Freedom and Justice	7,429	3.13%
Anton Palyulin	Party of Growth	3,804	1.60%
Roman Ilyin	Civic Platform	3,625	1.53%
Total		237,571	100%

=== 2026 ===
Summary of the 18-20 September 2026 Russian legislative election in the Cheryomushki constituency
Candidate	Party	Votes	%
Dmitry Nazarov	United Russia	108,728	42.68%
Aleksey Smirnov	Yabloko	33,350	13.09%
Aleksandr Kondratenko	Communist Party	28,468	11.17%
Aleksandr Berdnikov	New People	28,077	11.02%
Andrey Nesterenko	Liberal Democratic Party	17,005	6.67%
Maksim Chirkov	A Just Russia	16,914	6.64%
Lev Yudin	The Greens	11,018	4.32%
Sergey Abaimov	Communists of Russia	9,878	3.88%
Total		254,770	100%
