= Chertanovo constituency =

Russian legislative constituency

Chertanovo single-member constituency
- Constituency of the Russian State Duma

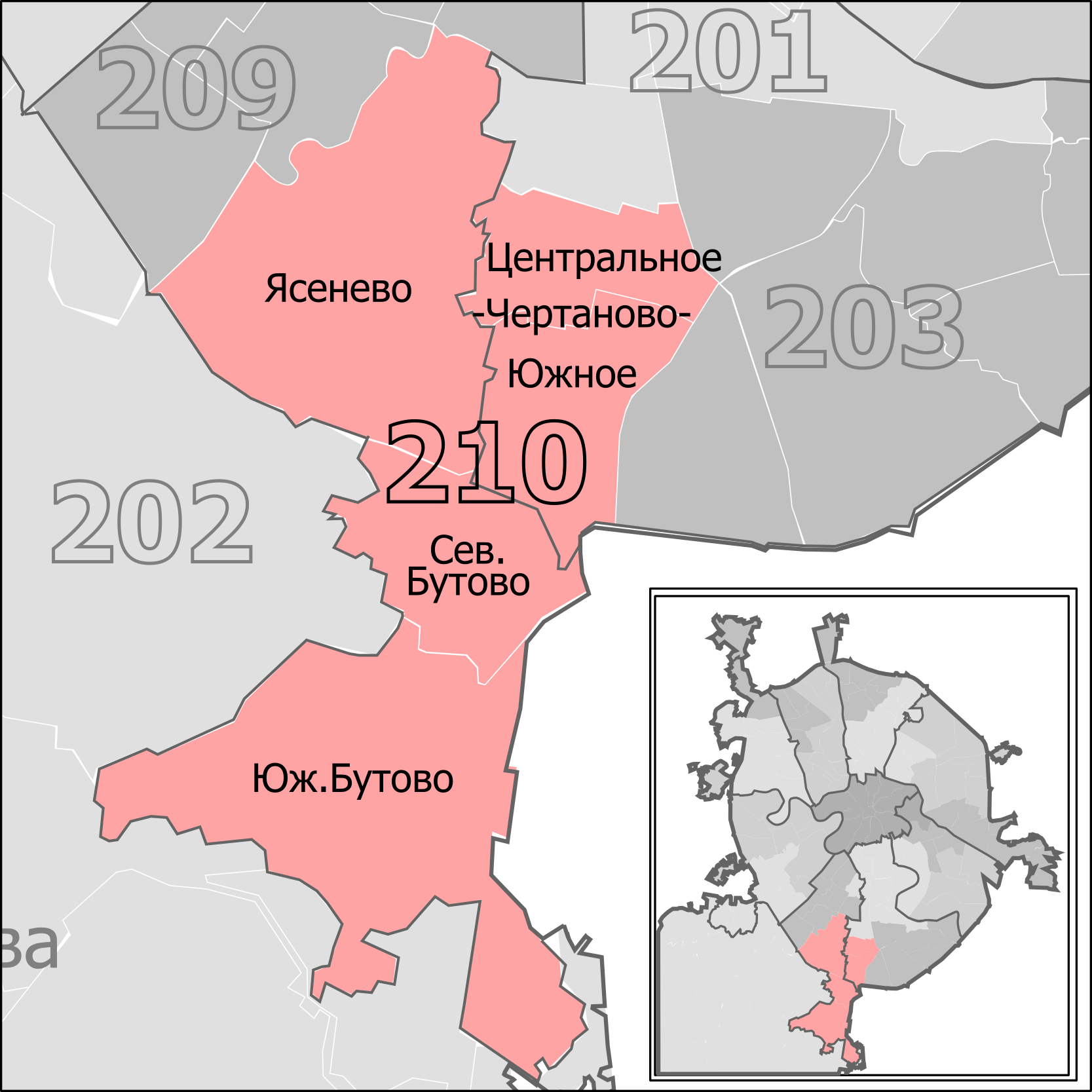
- Constituency boundaries since 2016
- Deputy: Roman Romanenko; United Russia
- Federal subject: Moscow
- Districts: Southern AO (Chertanovo Tsentralnoye, Chertanovo Yuzhnoye), South-Western AO (Severnoye Butovo, Yasenevo, Yuzhnoye Butovo)
- Voters: 463,354 (2026)

The Chertanovo constituency (No.209 (Note: No.192 Varshavsky in 1993-1995, No.204 in 1995-2007, No.210 in 2016–2026)) is a Russian legislative constituency in Moscow. The constituency covers outer Southern and South-Western Moscow.

The constituency has been represented since 2021 by United Russia deputy Roman Romanenko, four-term State Duma member and retired cosmonaut, who won the open seat, succeeding two-term United Russia incumbent Anatoly Vyborny after the latter successfully sought re-election only through party-list proportional representation.

== Boundaries ==
1993–1995 Varshavsky constituency: South-Western Administrative Okrug (Kotlovka District, Severnoye Butovo District, Yuzhnoye Butovo District Zyuzino District), Southern Administrative Okrug (Chertanovo Severnoye District, Chertanovo Tsentralnoye District, Chertanovo Yuzhnoye District, Nagorny District)
The constituency covered parts of Southern and South-Western Moscow, stretching along most of Varshavskoye Highway.

1995–2003: South-Western Administrative Okrug (Severnoye Butovo District, Yuzhnoye Butovo District, Zyuzino District), Southern Administrative Okrug (Biryulyovo Zapadnoye District, Chertanovo Severnoye District, Chertanovo Tsentralnoye District, Chertanovo Yuzhnoye District, Nagorny District)
Following the 1995 redistricting the constituency was renamed "Chertanovo constituency" and was changed, losing Kotlovka to Cheryomushki constituency. This seat instead gained Biryulyovo Zapadnoye to its east from the former Nagatinsky constituency.

2003–2007: South-Western Administrative Okrug (Kotlovka District, Severnoye Butovo District, Yuzhnoye Butovo District), Southern Administrative Okrug (Biryulyovo Zapadnoye District, Chertanovo Severnoye District, Chertanovo Tsentralnoye District, Chertanovo Yuzhnoye District, Nagorny District)
After the 2003 redistricting the constituency was slightly altered, swapping Zyuzino for Kotlovka with Cheryomushki constituency.

2016–present: South-Western Administrative Okrug (Severnoye Butovo District, Yasenevo District, Yuzhnoye Butovo District), Southern Administrative Okrug (Chertanovo Tsentralnoye District, Chertanovo Yuzhnoye District)
The constituency was re-created for the 2016 election and retained southern part of its former territory, losing Kotlovka, Nagorny District and Chertanovo Severnoye to Nagatinsky constituency as well as Biryulyovo Zapadnoye to Orekhovo–Borisovo constituency. This seat instead gained Yasenevo from Cheryomushki constituency.

== Members elected ==
Election	Member	Party
1993	Sergey Kovalyov	Choice of Russia
1995	Sergey Kovalyov	Democratic Choice of Russia – United Democrats
1999	Sergey Shokhin (Note: appointed Auditor of the Accounts Chamber of Russia in April 2001)	Fatherland – All Russia
2003	Vladimir Gruzdev	United Russia
2007	Proportional representation - no election by constituency	
2011	Proportional representation - no election by constituency	
2016	Anatoly Vyborny	United Russia
2021	Roman Romanenko	United Russia
2026	Roman Romanenko	United Russia

== Election results ==
=== 1993 ===
Summary of the 12 December 1993 Russian legislative election in the Varshavsky constituency
Candidate	Party	Votes	%
Sergey Kovalyov	Choice of Russia	50,175	23.35%
Viktor Kobelev	Liberal Democratic Party	–	8.49%
Vladimir Chernetsky	Independent	–	–
Mikhail Kononov	Kedr	–	–
Mikhail Konovalov	Communist Party	–	–
Andrey Kosyakov	Independent	–	–
Mikhail Motorin	Yavlinky–Boldyrev–Lukin	–	–
Shamsiyat Muradova	Agrarian Party	–	–
Vladimir Rebrikov	Independent	–	–
Aleksandr Terekhov	Independent	–	–
Aleksandr Vetrov	Russian Democratic Reform Movement	–	–
Total		214,877	100%

=== 1995 ===
Summary of the 17 December 1995 Russian legislative election in the Chertanovo constituency
Candidate	Party	Votes	%
Sergey Kovalyov (incumbent)	Democratic Choice of Russia – United Democrats	64,947	23.35%
Nikolay Maslov	Independent	47,081	16.93%
Oleg Rumyantsev	Stanislav Govorukhin Bloc	40,250	14.47%
Nikolay Troshkin	Communist Party	37,886	13.62%
Dmitry Vasilyev	Independent	9,460	3.40%
Vadim Pechenev	Ivan Rybkin Bloc	6,282	2.26%
Mikhail Karpenko	Education - Future of Russia	5,705	2.05%
Vladimir Rebrikov	Independent	5,304	1.91%
Nikolay Pilipeshin	Frontier Generation	4,858	1.75%
Andrey Poteryakhin	Independent	4,429	1.59%
Vadim Burlak	Federal Democratic Movement	4,338	1.56%
Vyacheslav Mavrodi	Independent	1,764	0.63%
against all		39,043	14.04%
Total		278,119	100%

=== 1999 ===
Summary of the 19 December 1999 Russian legislative election in the Chertanovo constituency
Candidate	Party	Votes	%
Sergey Shokhin	Fatherland – All Russia	111,763	36.68%
Aleksey Ulyukayev	Union of Right Forces	43,073	14.14%
Nikolay Taranyov	Communist Party	27,207	8.93%
Natalya Ilyina	Independent	26,401	8.67%
Anatoly Nemov	Independent	17,491	5.74%
Yury Naumov	Russian Socialist Party	6,284	2.06%
Vadim Pechenev	Spiritual Heritage	4,558	1.50%
against all		58,203	19.10%
Total		304,669	100%

=== 2001 ===
The results of the by-election were invalidated due to low turnout.

Summary of the 14 October 2001 by-election in the Chertanovo constituency
Candidate	Party	Votes	%
Vladimir Gruzdev	Independent	67,227	70.39%
Yury Abramov	Independent	8,034	8.41%
Vladimir Ageychenkov	Independent	3,795	3.97%
Nikolay Zhdanov-Lutsenko	Independent	3,540	3.71%
Valery Zhilin	Independent	2,465	2.58%
against all		8,114	8.50%
Total		95,501	100%

=== 2003 ===
Summary of the 7 December 2003 Russian legislative election in the Chertanovo constituency
Candidate	Party	Votes	%
Vladimir Gruzdev	United Russia	149,069	53.78%
Vladimir Kara-Murza	Union of Right Forces	23,800	8.59%
Sergey Seregin	Communist Party	18,992	6.85%
Yelena Yakovleva	Independent	9,191	3.32%
Nikolay Sokolov	Liberal Democratic Party	5,784	2.09%
Yury Timofeyev	Party of Russia's Rebirth-Russian Party of Life	4,950	1.79%
Vladimir Rebrikov	National Patriotic Forces of Russia	4,347	1.57%
Yevgeny Shvets	Independent	4,250	1.53%
Maksim Krasikov	Independent	3,350	1.21%
Vyacheslav Palashchenko	United Russian Party Rus'	1,449	0.52%
against all		47,597	17.17%
Total		278,730	100%

=== 2016 ===
Summary of the 18 September 2016 Russian legislative election in the Chertanovo constituency
Candidate	Party	Votes	%
Anatoly Vyborny	United Russia	65,144	40.94%
Denis Davydov	Communist Party	18,700	11.75%
Platon Grekov	Liberal Democratic Party	13,505	8.49%
Vladimir Kochetkov	A Just Russia	11,554	7.26%
Aleksey Krapukhin	Yabloko	11,312	7.11%
Nikolay Topornin	Party of Growth	5,923	3.72%
Dmitry Androsov	People's Freedom Party	5,334	3.35%
Mark Chumakov	Communists of Russia	5,316	3.34%
Denis Merkulov	Rodina	4,910	3.09%
Andrey Tsitsilin	The Greens	4,818	3.03%
Vadim Kokarev	Patriots of Russia	4,208	2.64%
Pyotr Shcherbachenko	Civilian Power	2,157	1.36%
Mikhail Rastashansky	Civic Platform	1,307	0.82%
Total		159,138	100%

=== 2021 ===
Summary of the 17-19 September 2021 Russian legislative election in the Chertanovo constituency
Candidate	Party	Votes	%
Roman Romanenko	United Russia	91,161	40.23%
Mikhail Tarantsov	Communist Party	56,025	24.72%
Mikhail Nachevsky	New People	17,198	7.59%
Vladimir Butkeyev	A Just Russia — For Truth	16,082	7.10%
Vladislav Korshunkov	Liberal Democratic Party	10,079	4.45%
Yevgeny Barmenkov	The Greens	8,420	3.72%
Aleksey Krapukhin	Yabloko	6,802	3.00%
Leonid Tarashchansky	Communists of Russia	5,659	2.50%
Arseny Yatsevsky	Russian Party of Freedom and Justice	4,616	2.04%
Anatoly Batashev	Green Alternative	3,988	1.76%
Stepan Smitiyenko	Civic Platform	2,629	1.16%
Total		226,596	100%

=== 2026 ===
Summary of the 18-20 September 2026 Russian legislative election in the Chertanovo constituency
Candidate	Party	Votes	%
Roman Romanenko (incumbent)	United Russia	109,099	43.82%
Maksim Zharkov	New People	31,014	12.46%
Vera Ganzya	Communist Party	26,773	10.75%
Igor Zhilin	Yabloko	20,764	8.34%
Yegor Koskov	Liberal Democratic Party	18,829	7.56%
Yury Nagayev	A Just Russia	14,683	5.90%
Anastasia Afanasyeva	The Greens	13,635	5.48%
Yelena Baskova	Communists of Russia	13,290	5.34%
Total		248,970	100%
