= Alexander Rumyantsev (politician) =

Russian politician (born 1947)

Alexander Rumyantsev MP
- Александр Румянцев
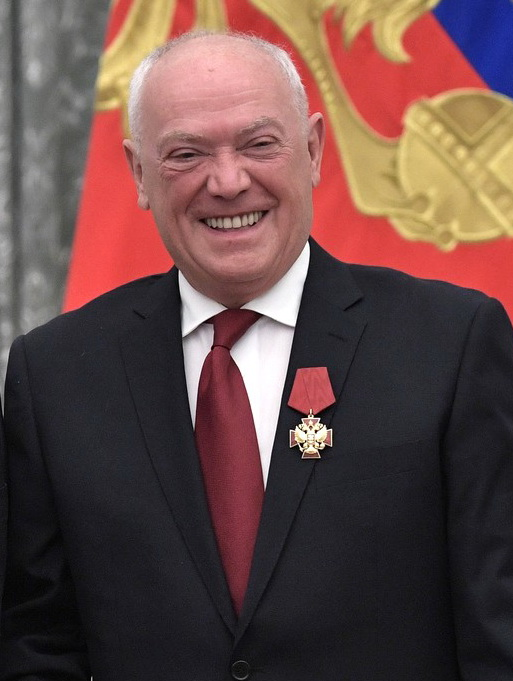
- Rumyantsev in 2019

Member of the State Duma for Moscow
- Incumbent
- Assumed office 12 October 2021
- Preceded by: Dmitry Morozov
- Constituency: Cheryomushki (No. 209)

Personal details
- Born: 12 February 1947 (age 79) Novogeorgievsk, Kirovohrad Oblast, Ukrainian SSR, USSR
- Party: United Russia
- Education: 2nd Moscow State Medical University (D.Sc.)
- Occupation: Physician; Researcher

Alexander Grigorievich Rumyantsev (Russian: Александр Григорьевич Румянцев, born 12 February 1947 in Novogeorgievsk, Kirovohrad Oblast) is a world-known pediatric hematologist, professor of the Russian Academy of Sciences, and a deputy of the 8th State Duma. In 1984, he was granted a Doctor of Sciences in Medicine degree.

In 1971, Rumyantsev started working as a clinical resident doctor. From 1976 to 1984, he was an assistant at the department of pediatrics. In 1986–1987, he was a professor at the department of children diseases. In 1986–1987, Rumyantsev participated in expedition trips to the affected regions of the USSR to eliminate the consequences of the Chernobyl disaster. From 2004 to 2010, Rumyantsev headed the Department of Hematology/Oncology and Immunology. In 2012, he was appointed professor of the oncology department at the Russian National Research Medical University. From 1978 to 1991, Rumyantsev was the chief pediatric hematologist at the Ministry of Health. Since being elected in September 2021, he has served as deputy to the 8th State Duma from the Cheryomushki constituency in Moscow.

Alexander Rumyantsev organized pediatric hematology and oncology service in Russia, which specializes in children diseases treatment, such as acute leukemia, lymphoma and brain tumors.

== Sanctions ==
He was sanctioned by the UK government in March 2022 in relation to the Russo-Ukrainian War.

== Awards ==
- Order of Friendship of Peoples
- Order "For Merit to the Fatherland"
- Order of the Rising Sun
