= School No. 118 (Moscow) =

School in Moscow, Russia

- Russian: средняя школа № 118

Location
- Coordinates: 55°41′21″N 37°32′16″E

School No. 118 (Russian: средняя школа № 118) is a school located in Gagarinsky District, South-Western Administrative Okrug, Moscow.

== History ==
The school was founded in 2005 as a result of the merger of the Center for Children's Creativity, Art and Sports — an institution of additional education — and School No. 1 (which had existed since 1975 and had serious problems at that time). The merger breathed new life into the educational institution. Since 2007, the center has been implementing a family education program, and the Perspective family education club has been operating, providing assistance to teachers and parents. The school pays much attention to caring for children's health. In 2013 in accordance with the order of the Moscow City Education Department No. 57 dated 20.02.2013 School No. 1 was reorganized into School No. 118.
