= Generala Tyuleneva (Moscow Metro) =

Moscow Metro station

Generala Tyuleneva Генерала Тюленева
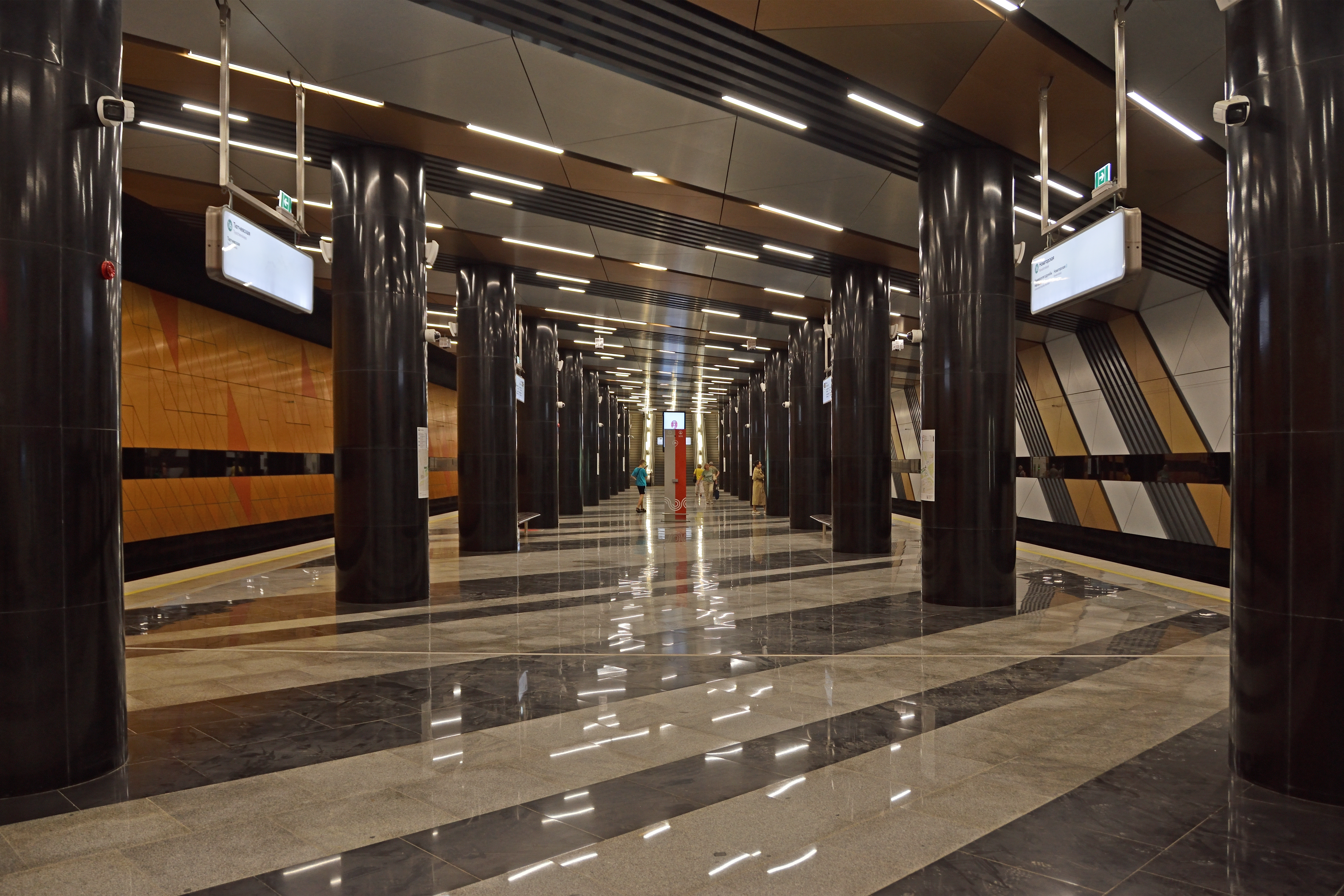

General information
- Location: Tyoply Stan District, SWAO; Moscow; Russia
- Coordinates: 55.626239°N 37.485850°E
- System: Moscow Metro station
- Owner: Moskovsky Metropoliten
- Line: Troitskaya line

History
- Opened: 7 September 2024

Services
Preceding station	Moscow Metro	Following station
Tyutchevskaya towards Novomoskovskaya	Troitskaya line	Universitet Druzhby Narodov towards Novatorskaya
Route map
Location
- Location within Moscow Metro

Generala Tyuleneva (Russian: Генерала Тюленева) is a Moscow Metro station located on Troitskaya line. It was opened on 7 September 2024 as part of the inaugural segment of the line, between Novatorskaya and Tyutchevskaya.

Generala Tyuleneva is located between Universitet Druzhby Narodov and Tyutchevskaya.

The station is built at the intersection of Tyoply Stan Street and Generala Tyuleneva Street, hence the name. The exits are constructed at the terrain previously occupied by a big supermarket of the Perekrestok chain, which was demolished to give way to the station.

== Gallery ==
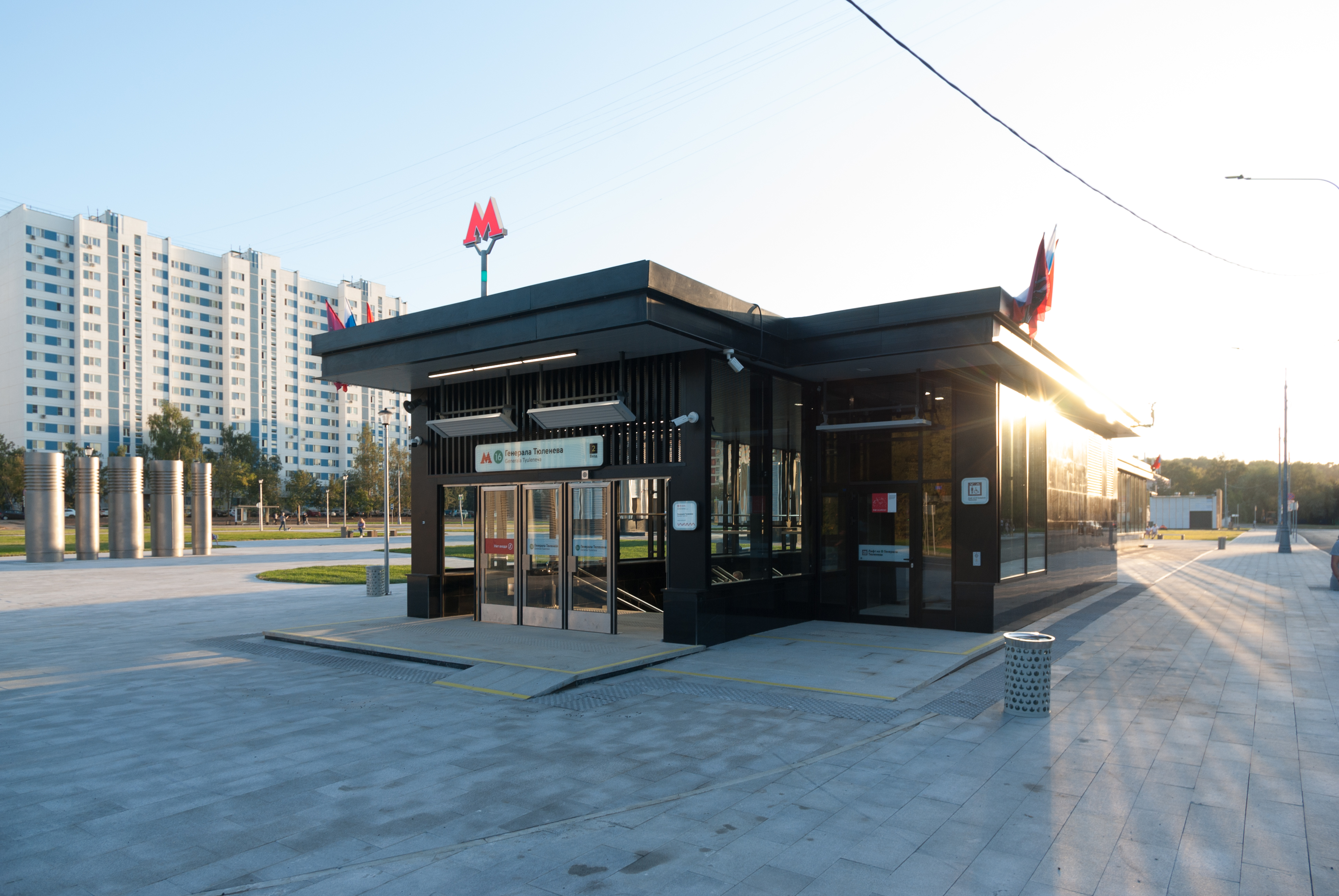

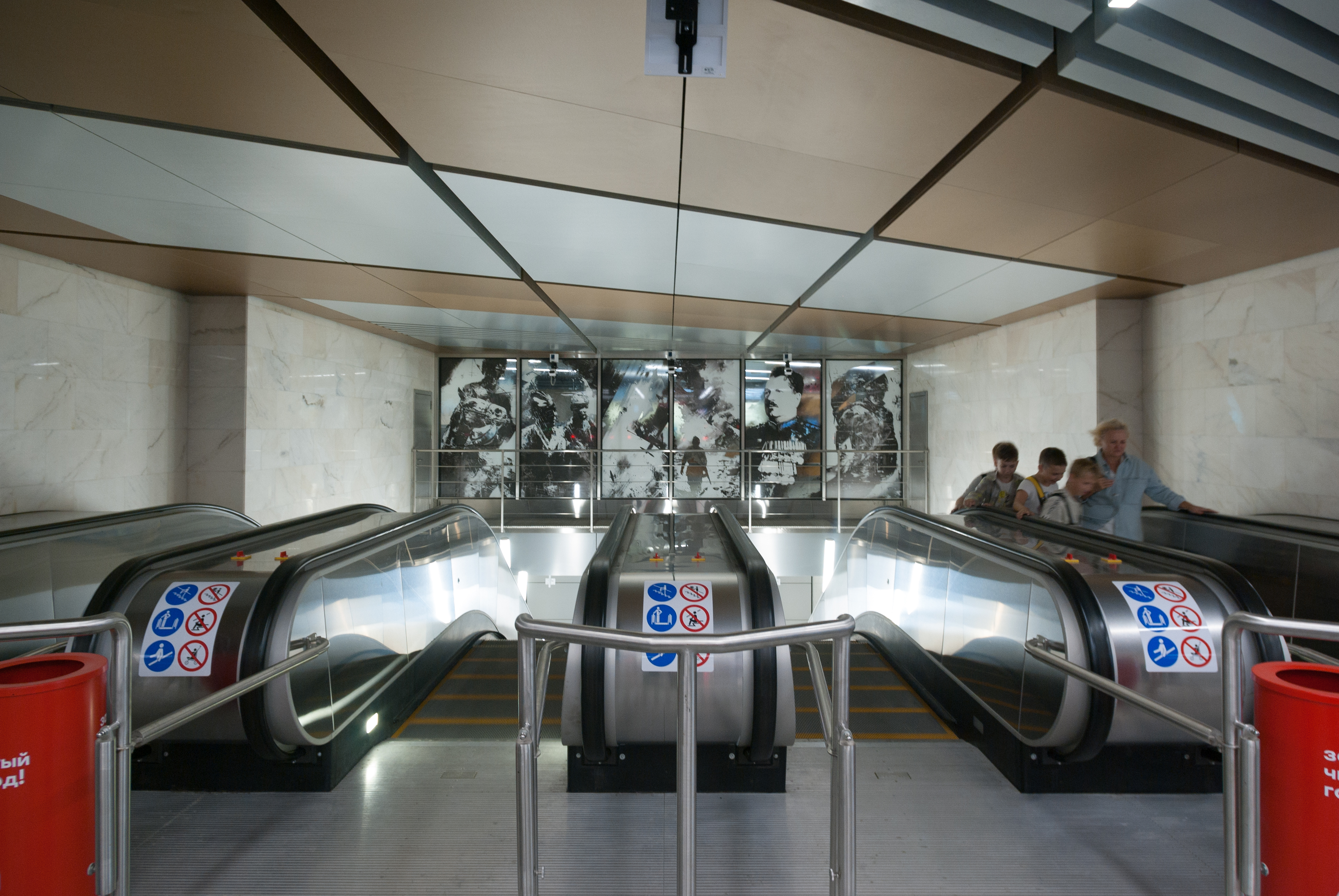

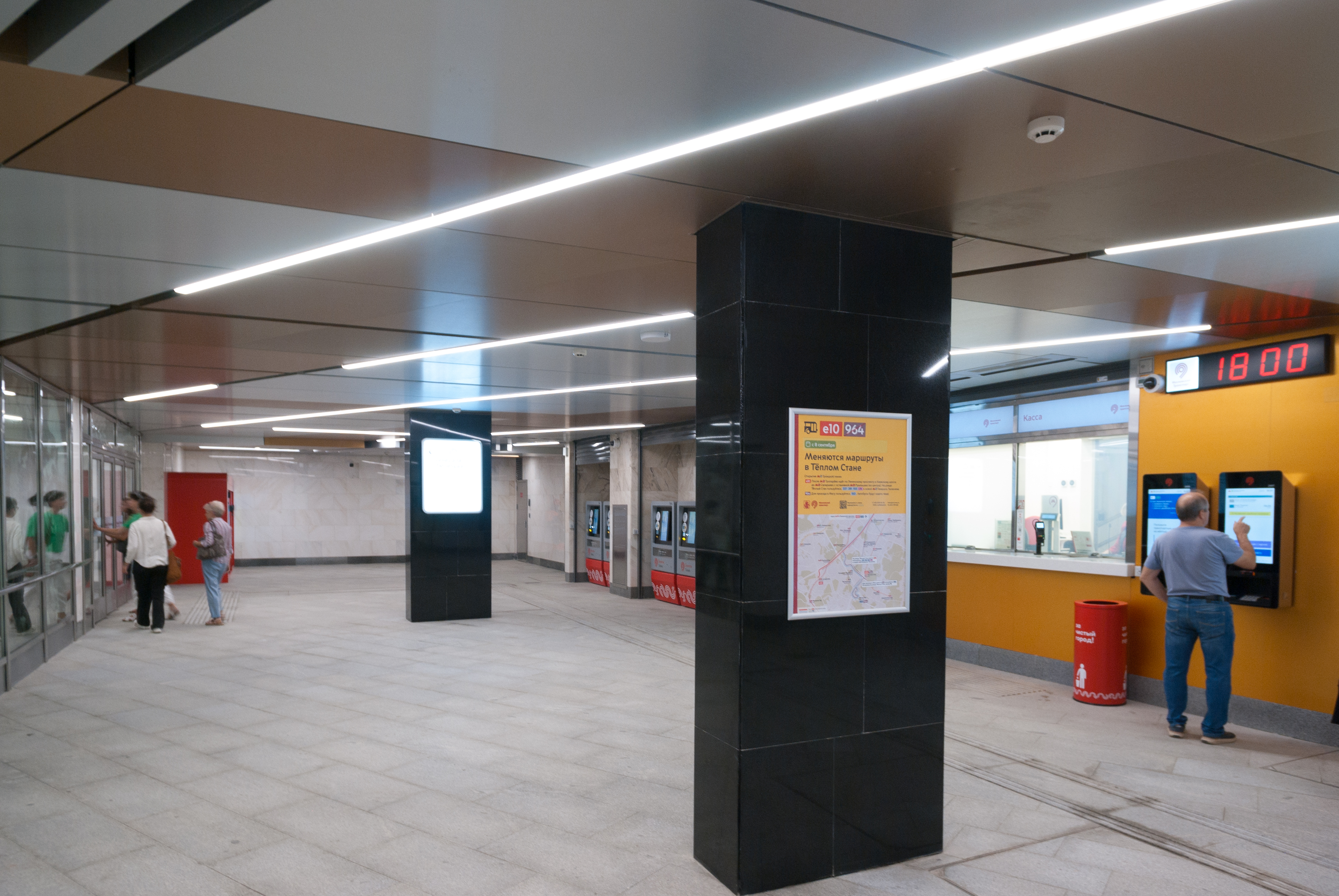
