= Hinkson Christian Academy =

- Школа им. Хинксона

Location
- Novocheryomushkinskaya Ul. 39, Korpus 3, Moscow, Russia 117218; Новочеремушкинская ул., 39, Москва, Россия; Moscow; Russia
- Coordinates: 55.6761067°N 37.574107799°E

Information
- Type: K-12 school
- Grades: K-12
- Website: hinkson.ru

Hinkson Christian Academy (HCA; Russian: Школа им. Хинксона) is a private Christian coeducational day school located in the South-Western Administrative Okrug, Moscow, Russia, serving students from kindergarten through 12th grade. All classes at HCA are conducted in English except foreign language classes. AP and honors courses are available for juniors and seniors.

School facilities include 22 classrooms, a computer lab, an art room, a music room, a fully equipped science lab, ESL and learning support classrooms, a library, and a gymnasium equipped with a weight room and locker rooms. The average high school class size is 10 students.

== History ==
In the fall of 1991 New Life Christian School in Moscow, Russia, began as a Christian school designed to meet the educational needs of local Christian expat families. It began with nineteen children and three teachers in a classroom rented from a Russian school. The 1994–1995 school year saw the first graduating class. That same year, HCA was granted official registration from the Russian government. On September 5, 1996, HCA officially began the 1996–1997 academic year in an old Russian kindergarten building.

In 2000, HCA moved into a larger facility and was able to add new programs – ESL, Resource Education. Enrollment grew to a high of over 200 students per year and over 60 full and part-time staff.

== Curriculum ==
The high school offers an entirely college preparatory curriculum for students in grades 9 through 12 including AP and honors courses.

== Accreditation ==
Hinkson Christian Academy is accredited by the Association of Christian Schools International in Colorado Springs, CO. Additionally, the school is accredited by the Middle States Accreditation of Colleges and Schools in Philadelphia, PA.
