= Anatoly Vyborny =

Russian politician

Anatoly Vyborny MP
- Анатолий Выборный
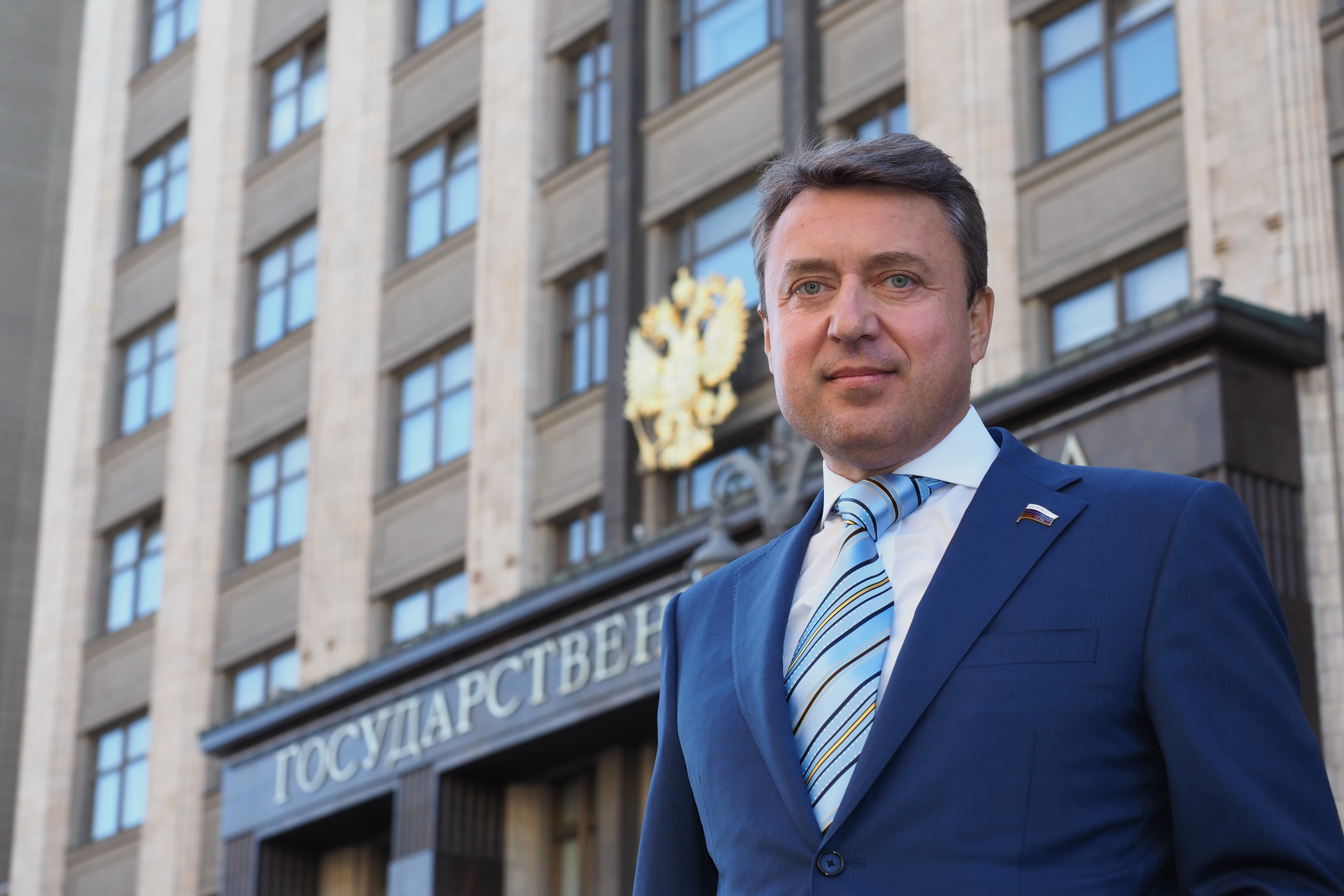

Member of the State Duma (Party List Seat)
- Incumbent
- Assumed office 12 October 2021
- In office 21 December 2011 – 5 October 2016

Member of the State Duma for Moscow
- In office 5 October 2016 – 12 October 2021
- Preceded by: constituency re-established
- Succeeded by: Roman Romanenko
- Constituency: Chertanovo (No. 210)

Personal details
- Born: 8 June 1965 (age 60) Shepetivka, Ukrainian SSR, Soviet Union
- Party: United Russia
- Education: Lviv Higher Military-Political School; Kutafin Moscow State Law University

Anatoly Borisovich Vyborny (Russian: Анатолий Борисович Выборный; born 8 June 1965, Shepetivka) is a Russian political figure and a deputy of the 6th, 7th, and 8th State Dumas.

From 1988 to 1991, he served at the Soviet Armed Forces. From 1991 to 2003, Vyborny worked at the Military Prosecutor's Office of the Russian Federation. From 2003 to 2010, he was the Chief Adviser of the Department for Cooperation with Law Enforcement Agencies of The Office of the Plenipotentiary Representative of the President of the Russian Federation in the Central Federal District. On 4 December 2011 he was elected deputy of the 6th State Duma. In 2016, he was re-elected for the 7th State Duma. Since September 2021, he has served as deputy of the 8th State Duma.

== Sanctions ==
He was sanctioned by the UK government in 2022 in relation to the Russo-Ukrainian War.
