= Dmitry Morozov =

Russian politician

Dmitry Morozov MP
- Дмитрий Морозов
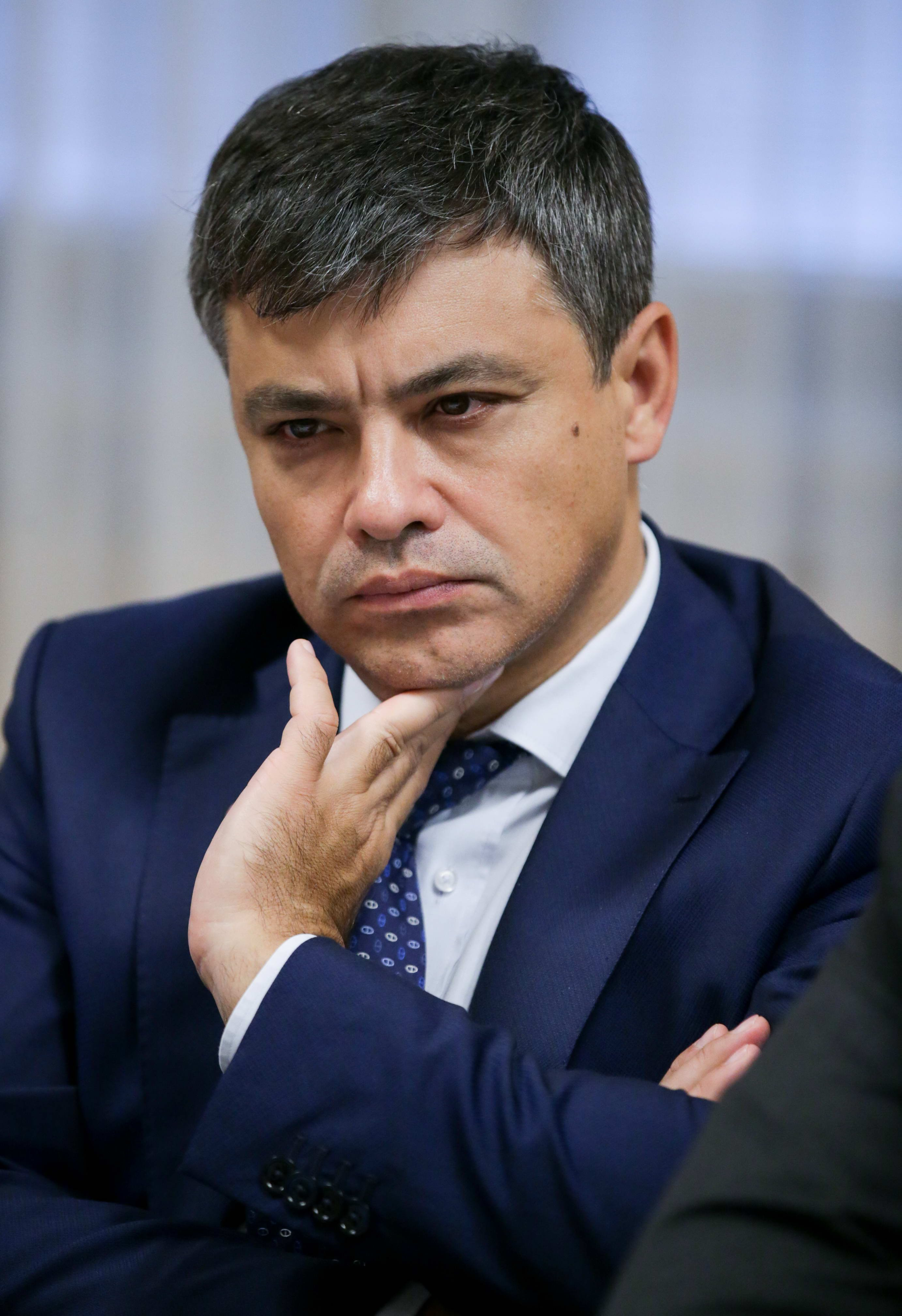

Member of the State Duma for Moscow
- In office 5 October 2016 – 12 October 2021
- Preceded by: constituency re-established
- Constituency: Cheryomushki (No. 208)

Personal details
- Born: 5 May 1971 (age 54) Minsk, Belarusian SSR, USSR
- Party: United Russia
- Children: 3 (2 sons, 1 daughter)
- Education: SSMU; RSMU (D.Sc.Med.)
- Occupation: Surgeon; Professor

Dmitry Anatolyevich Morozov (Note: Also transliterated as Dmitrii Anatolievich Morozov.) (Russian: Дмитрий Анатольевич Морозов; born 5 May 1971) is a Russian paediatric surgeon, medical researcher, politician, and former deputy for the United Russia party in the 7th State Duma of the Russian Federation. He was the head of the committee for health.

Born in Minsk, Belarus, then part of the Soviet Union, Morozov graduated from the pediatric faculty of Saratov State Medical University in 1994, completing his residency at the university hospital two years later in 1996. In 2000, he completed a Doctor of Sciences in Medicine at the Russian State Medical University, which was renamed in 2011 as the Russian National Research Medical University named for N. I. Pirogov. Since 2013 he has worked as the department head of paediatric surgery and urology/andrology at First Moscow State Medical University.
