= Swedish School in Moscow =

- Svenska Skolan i Moskva

Location
- Leninsky Prospekt 78 A, 119261 Moscow; Moscow; Russia; 55.68311768610458°N 37.53386482753752°E

Information
- Type: Swedish international school
- Website: ssim.nu

The Swedish School in Moscow (Swedish: Svenska Skolan i Moskva, SSIM) is a Swedish international school in Lomonosovsky District, South-Western Administrative Okrug, Moscow, Russia. The language of instruction is Swedish and students are of ages 2 through 16. Malin Norman, writing for Scan Magazine, described it as "a bit of an oasis for Swedes and other Scandinavians."

== History ==
Circa 1978 there were three students from Norway and eight students from Sweden, and there was a possibility that there would be fewer students from Sweden in later periods. By 2009, the school also had students from Denmark and Russia.

== Campus ==
The Swedish school is located on the first floor of a campus shared with the Moscow Finnish School, the Moscow Japanese School, and the Scuola Italiana Italo Calvino (Italian school).

== See also ==
- Russia–Sweden relations
