= Saratov State Medical University =

Russian medical university

Coordinates: 51°32′18″N 46°00′28″E

- Саратовский государственный медицинский университет им. В. И. Разумовского
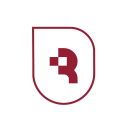
- Other names: Saratov State Medical University named after V.I. Razumovsky, Razumovsky University
- Former names: Imperial University, Saratov State Medical Institute,
- Motto: «Знание и наследие»
- Motto in English: «Knowledge and heritage» (Latin: «Eruditio (Scientia, cognition) et Heredium»)
- Type: Public
- Established: 10 June 1909 (117 years ago) - Imperial University, Saratov; 1930 (96 years ago) - Saratov State Medical Institute; 1976 (50 years ago) - Saratov Order of the Red Banner Medical Institute; 1993 (33 years ago) - Saratov State Medical University
- Rector: Andrey Vyacheslavovich Eremin
- Location: 112 B. Kazachia Street, Saratov, Saratov Oblast, 410000, Russian Federation
- Language: Russian, English
- Colours: Red and white
- Website: www.sgmu.ru/en/

The Saratov State Medical University (SSMU; Russian: Саратовский государственный медицинский университет им. В. И. Разумовского, lit. 'Saratov State Medical University named after V.I. Razumovsky'; also known as Razumovsky University) is a public university located in Saratov, Russia.

== History ==
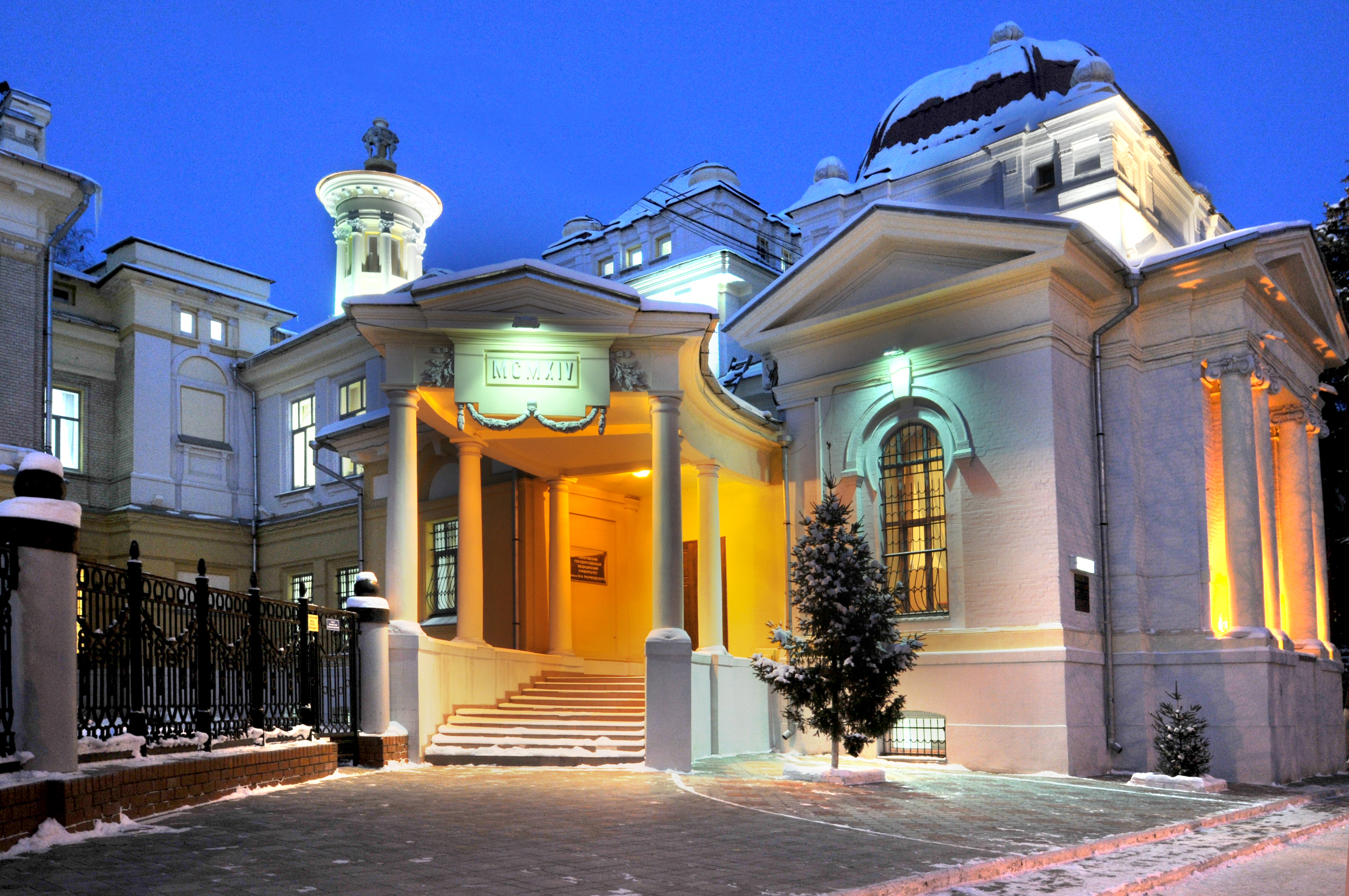
Image of the university

The university was founded in 1909 as Imperial University by the Decree of Emperor Nicholas II. On June 10, 1909, the Emperor signed the "Decree on the foundation of the university in Saratov", which became the tenth University in Russia and consisted of the Medical Faculty only. Professor V.I. Razumovsky became the first university rector. In 1930, the Medical Faculty of Saratov University was transformed into an independent institution of higher education, which was known as the Medical Institute.

In 1993, it received the status of a Medical University. In 2009, the university was named after its first rector Vasily Ivanovich Razumovsky.

Such Russian scientists as Prof. A. Bogomolets, Prof. S. Spasokukotsky, Prof. S. Mirotvortsev, Prof. K. Tretiakoff, L. Leitman (the world's first female professor of forensic medicine) provided students with the knowledge in the SSMU.

In 2019, the university was ranked in the top 50 universities in Russia by Forbes.

In 2021, it was ranked in the top 300 universities in the world for Good health and well-being by Times Higher Education.

== Faculties ==
- Faculty of General Medicine
- Faculty of Pediatrics
- Faculty of Dentistry
- Faculty of Medical and Preventative Care
- Faculty of Pharmacy
- Faculty of Clinical Psychology
- Nursing Institute
- Faculty of Vocational Training and Professional Retraining of Specialists

== Departments ==
- Obstetrics and Gynecology
- Obstetrics and Gynecology Faculty of Medicine
- Obstetrics and Gynecology of the Faculty of Pediatrics
- Human anatomy
- Biochemistry and clinical laboratory diagnostics
- Hygiene of the Medical and Preventive Faculty
- Histology
- Ophthalmology
- Hospital Pediatrics and Neonatology
- Hospital Therapy Faculty of Medicine
- Hospital Surgery Medical Faculty
- Dermatovenereology and cosmetology
- Children's diseases of the medical faculty
- Foreign languages
- Infectious diseases
- Infectious diseases in children and outpatient pediatrics named after N. R. Ivanova
- Clinical immunology and allergology
- Therapeutic exercise sports medicine and physiotherapy
- Radiation Diagnostics and Radiation Therapy named after Professor N. E. Stern
- Medical Biophysics named after Professor V. D. Zernov
- Microbiology, virology and immunology
- Mobilization training of healthcare and disaster medicine
- Neurology them. K. N. Tretyakova
- Neurosurgery
- Normal Physiology named after I. A. Chuevsky
- General biology, pharmacognosy and botany
- General hygiene and ecology
- General surgery
- General, bioorganic and pharmaceutical chemistry
- Public Health and Health (with courses in jurisprudence and medical history)
- Operative surgery and topographic anatomy
- Otorhinolaryngology
- Pathological anatomy
- Pathological physiology named after Academician A. A. Bogomolets
- Pedagogy, educational technology and professional communication
- Pediatrics
- Polyclinic therapy, general medical practice and preventive medicine
- Propaedeutics of internal diseases
- Propaedeutics of childhood diseases, pediatric endocrinology and diabetology
- Propaedeutics of dental diseases
- Occupational pathology, hematology and clinical pharmacology
- Psychiatry, narcology, psychotherapy and clinical psychology
- Russian and Latin
- Emergency anesthesiology and resuscitation care and simulation technologies in medicine
- Pediatric dentistry and orthodontics
- Orthopedic dentistry
- Therapeutic dentistry
- Dental surgery and maxillofacial surgery
- Forensic medicine named after Professor M. I. Raysky
- Therapies with courses in cardiology, functional diagnostics and geriatrics
- Therapy, gastroenterology and pulmonology
- Traumatology and orthopedics
- Urology
- Faculty of Pediatrics
- Faculty Therapy Faculty of Medicine
- Faculty of Surgery and oncology
- Pharmacology
- Pharmaceutical technology and biotechnology
- Physical education
- Philosophy, humanities and psychology
- Phthisiology
- Phthisiopulmonology
- Pediatric surgery
- Surgery and oncology
- Economics and management of health care and pharmacy
- Endocrinology
- Epidemiology

Specialists at research and development institutes, centres, laboratories, museums, and innovation groups at Saratov State Medical University conduct fundamental and applied scientific research. Among them are the Research Institute of Basic and Clinical Uro-Nephrology, the Central Research Laboratory, the Scientific Educational Centre for Fundamental Medicine and Nanotechnologies, the Medical Technopark, the University Publishing House, the Scientific Medical Library, the Museum of University History, and many other university divisions. Around 7000 students graduate from the university each year.

== Governance ==
The university is nominally led by a Rector, who is the titular head of the university and is normally a public figure. The day-to-day chief executive role is the responsibility of the Prorector, a full-time academic post. The senior management board of the university is headed by the Prorector, assisted by Deans.

== Student life ==
The Trade Union secures that social and working rights of students are protected.

The Student Club runs over ten clubs. The university stand-up comedy teams are the winners of the regional Stand-Up Comedy League. The Student Folk Anatomical Theatre participates in various Russian theatre contests and performs in the university and on the stage of the Saratov Kiselev Academic Youth Theatre.

== Notable people ==
=== Rectors of the Saratov State Medical University ===
- Razumovsky Vasily Ivanovich (1909-1912)
- Chuevsky Ivan Afanasyevich (1912-1912)
- Stadnitsky Nikolai Grigorievich (1912-1913)
- Zabolotnov Pyotr Pavlovich (1914-1918)
- Arnoldov Vladimir Andreevich (1918-1918)
- Zernov Vladimir Dmitrievich (1918-1920)
- Golubev Vladimir Vasilyevich (1920-1922)
- Mirotvortsev Sergei Romanovich (1923-1928)
- Katsenbogen (1928-1931)
- Shkhvatsabaia Konstantin Yakovlevich (1931-1935)
- I.A. Arnoldi (1935-1937)
- IAroslavtsev Alexander Leontievich (April 1937 - December 1937)
- Samoilova Elena Evgenievna (1937-1938)
- V.N. Abramenko (1938-1940)
- Rapoport Pavel Lvovich (1940-1942)
- Bogoslovsky Ivan Trofimovich (1943-1948)
- Popov'ian Ivan Minaevich (1948-1953)
- Nikitin Boris Andreevich (1953-1960)
- Ivanov Nikolai Romanovich (1960-1989)
- Kirichuk Vyacheslav Fedorovich (1989-1997)
- Goremykin Vladimir Ilyich (1997-2002)
- Glybochko Pyotr Vitalievich (2002-2010)
- Popkov Vladimir Mikhailovich (2010-2020)
- Eremin Andrey Vyacheslavovich (September 2020 – Present)

=== Notable academics ===
- A.A. Bogomolets
- S.I. Spasokukotsky
- S.R. Mirotvortsev
