= Moscow Finnish School =

- Moskovan suomalainen peruskoulu

Location
- Leninskij Prospekt 78 A, 119261 Moskova; Moscow; Russia; 55.682693°N 37.53620990000002°E

Information
- Type: Finnish international school
- Established: 1965; 61 years ago
- Website: www.mossko.fi

The Moscow Finnish School (MFS, Finnish: Moskovan suomalainen peruskoulu, MSP) is a Finnish-education private school in Lomonosovsky District, South-Western Administrative Okrug, Moscow, Russia, operated by Suomalainen Koulutusyhdistys ry (lit. 'Finnish Education Association'). The school uses Finnish as its language of instruction and has lower and higher educational stages.

The school was founded in 1965. It moved to its current campus in 2003. It occupies 660 square metres (7,100 sq ft) of space on the third floor of its building, using it as classroom space. It shares the campus with the Moscow Japanese School, the Swedish School in Moscow, and the Scuola Italiana Italo Calvino (Italian school). The campus also has a dining hall, an indoor gymnasium, a technical classroom, a playing field that doubles as a skating rink in the winter, and outdoor athletic fields.

Most of the children have parents who work for the Embassy of Finland in Moscow and for Finnish companies. As of the 2007/2008 school year, there were 36 students in classes zero through nine.

== See also ==
- Finland–Russia relations
