= Scuola Italiana Italo Calvino =

- Итальянская школа имени Итало Кальвино
- Main: Leninskiy prospect 78/A 119261; Preschool: Ulitsa Lobachevskogo 38 119261; Russia

Information
- Website: schoolitalia.ru

The Scuola italiana "Italo Calvino" ("Italo Calvino Italian School"; Russian: Итальянская школа имени Итало Кальвино) is the only Italian curriculum school in Russia. It has two campuses in Moscow.

Its primary, secondary, and liceo linguistico levels are in one location, the second floor of a campus shared with the Swedish School in Moscow, the Moscow Finnish School, and the Moscow Japanese School. This campus is in Lomonosovsky District, South-Western Administrative Okrug.

The scuola materna is in a separate location.

Campuses

== See also ==
- Italy–Russia relations
