= Japanese School in Moscow =

- モスクワ日本人学校; Японская школа

Location
- Leninsky Prospekt 78A Moscow Russia; Ленинский проспект 78A, Москва, Россия; Moscow; Russia; 55.683061°N 37.533854099999985°E

Information
- Type: Japanese international school
- Established: 1967; 59 years ago
- Website: sites.google.com/view/mosnichi-edu/

Japanese School in Moscow (Russian: Японская школа, Japanese: モスクワ日本人学校 Mosukuwa Nihonjin Gakkō) is a Japanese international school located in Lomonosovsky District, South-Western Administrative Okrug, Moscow. It was established in 1967. It occupies the fourth and fifth floors of its building, which is also used by the Moscow Finnish School, the Swedish School in Moscow, and the Scuola Italiana Italo Calvino (Italian school). The campus also has a dining hall, an indoor gymnasium, a technical classroom, a playing field that doubles as a skating rink in the winter, and outdoor athletic fields.

== See also ==
- Japanese people in Russia
- Japanese language education in Russia
- Russian Embassy School in Tokyo
- Japan–Russia relations
