= Italy–Russia relations =

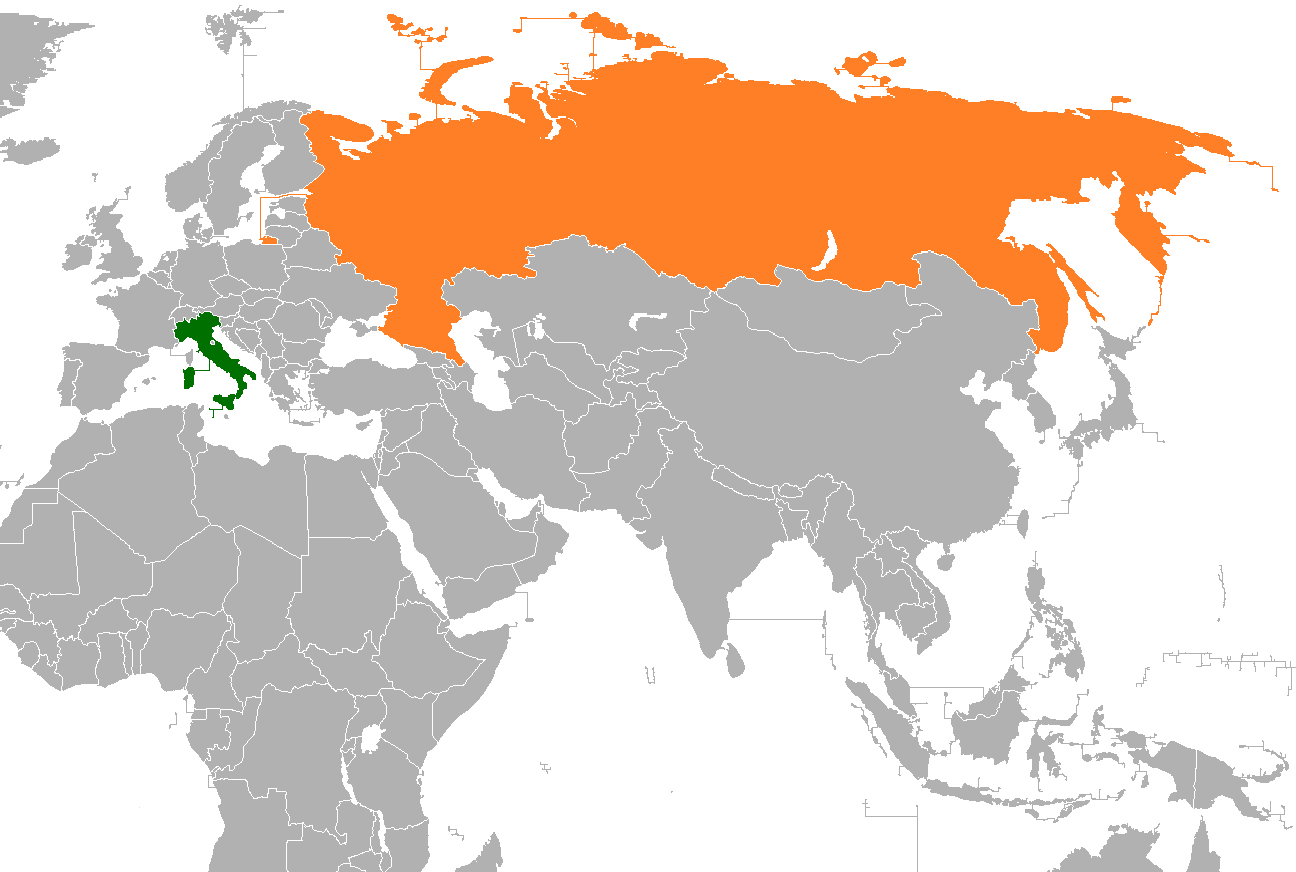
- Italy: Russia

Diplomatic mission
- Embassy of Italy, Moscow: Embassy of Russia, Rome

Italy–Russia relations are the bilateral relations between Russia and Italy, embodied in the so-called privileged relationship. Both countries are full members of the Organization for Security and Co-operation in Europe.

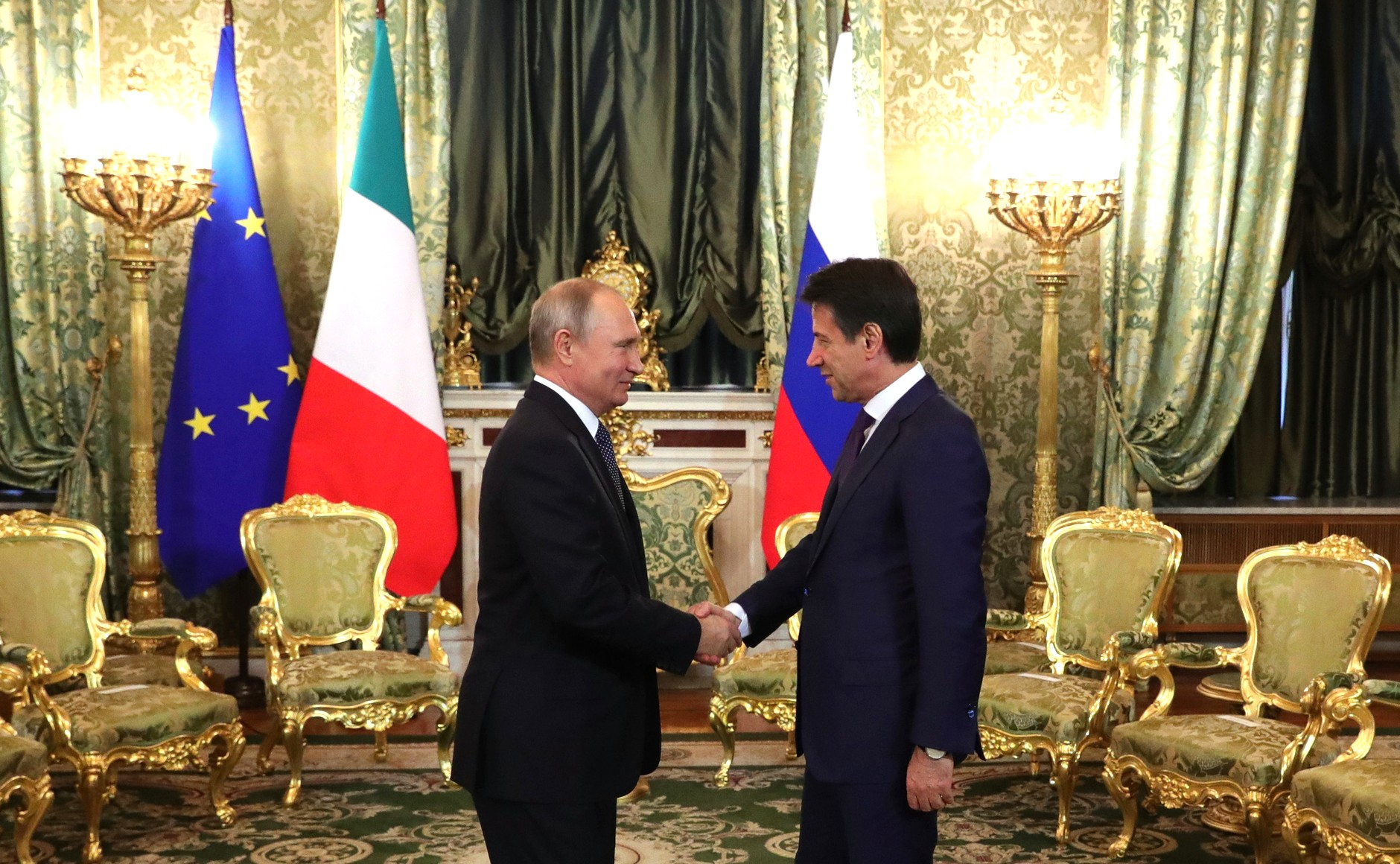
Italian Prime Minister Giuseppe Conte with Russian President Vladimir Putin in Moscow, 24 October 2018.

The relationship goes back a long way. In terms of international relations, there has been major culture to diplomatic interactions between Italy and Russia since the 15th century, apart from the role of Moscow's influence on the Italian Communist Party from 1920 to 1991. Communities of expatriates in each other's countries also exist.

== History ==
In the Middle Ages, the Italian maritime republics of Pisa and Genoa ruled the towns of Portus Pisanus and Tana on the coast of the Sea of Azov in present-day Russia. During Renaissance period there were significant culture exchange in terms of architecture and music. Prince Ivan III introduced Renaissance architecture to Russia by inviting a number of architects from Italy, who brought new construction techniques and some Renaissance style elements with them, while in general following the traditional designs of the Russian architecture. In 1475 the Bolognese architect Aristotele Fioravanti came to rebuild the Cathedral of the Dormition in the Moscow Kremlin, damaged in an earthquake. Fioravanti was given the 12th-century Assumption Cathedral in Vladimir as a model, and produced a design combining traditional Russian style with a Renaissance sense of spaciousness, proportion and symmetry. In 1485, Ivan III commissioned the building of a royal Terem Palace within the Kremlin, with Aloisio da Milano being the architect of the first three floors. Aloisio da Milano who replaced Pietro Antonio Solari built Palace of Facets, as well as the other Italian architects, also greatly contributed to the construction of the Kremlin walls and towers. The small banqueting hall of the Russian Tsars, called the Palace of Facets because of its facetted upper story, is the work of two Italians, Marco Ruffo and Pietro Solario, and shows a more Italian style.

In 1505, an Italian known in Russia as Aleviz Novyi built twelve churches for Ivan III, including the Cathedral of the Archangel, a building remarkable for the successful blending of Russian tradition, Orthodox requirements and Renaissance style.

In 1686–1699, the Republic of Venice and Tsardom of Russia were allies as part of the Holy League in the Great Turkish War against the Ottoman Empire.

Peter the Great and other Russian leaders looked to Italian cities for cultural models, especially in architecture and music. Italy for Russians has been the example of the highest stages of culture, whether classical, Renaissance, or Baroque. For example, the Kazan Cathedral in St. Petersburg was modelled after St. Peter's Basilica in Rome. Classical Russian literature of the 19th and early 20th centuries was strongly influenced by Renaissance Italy. Many Italian architects were present during the time of Peter's reign and his successors. During Peter's reign notable Italian architects like Domenico Trezzini who designed Peter and Paul Cathedral in Saint Petersburg. Followed by then came the Bartolomeo Francesco Rastrelli who was known for his distinctive "Rastrellian Baroque" style. His major works are located in the suburbs, in Peterhof Palace. Other Italian architects includes Antonio Rinaldi, Vincenzo Brenna, Carlo Rossi and Nicola Michetti who worked in Saint Petersburg to establish modern city. During the reign of Catherine the Great included the architect Francesco Bartolomeo Rastrelli who developed an easily recognizable style of Late Baroque, both sumptuous and majestic.His works includes Winter Palace in Saint Petersburg and the Catherine Palace in Tsarskoye Selo which are famed for extravagant luxury. Also the most influential Italian architect Giacomo Quarenghi who made supervision for the constricting of Alexander Palace. Even appointed to post of Catherine's court, the architect went on to produce remarkable number of designs for the Empress, her successors, her court members, houses, bridges, etc. During the reign of Elizabeth of Russia included the painter Stefano Torelli who painted ceilings in Royal Palace after being summoned by its court and even made some portraits, among the latter one of the Empress in armor as he was a brilliant caricatures, and also etched a few plates. Also during her reign another Italian born artists known as Giuseppe Valeriani who mainly painted murals and stage scenery.

After the victory against Napoleon in 1815, Russia challenged Austria's dominant position in northern Italy. Prince Klemens von Metternich successfully responded, and Tsar Alexander I of Russia finally went along in 1819–20.

Petrushka remains the most famous puppet show in Russia. Italian puppeteers introduced it in the first third of the 19th century. While most core characters came from Italy, they were soon transformed by the addition of material from the Russian lubki and intermedii.

Italian merchants flourished in Odesa in the 19th century. They helped develop commercial shipping in the Black Sea. They took an active role in the public and cultural life of the city and initiated projects for the improvement of business conditions in Odesa.

Tsar Nicholas I of Russia (ruled 1825–1855) was a major collector, patron and promoter of the arts. He favoured Italian culture and imposed his tastes and aesthetic orientation on the works that he bought for his personal art collection and for the New Hermitage museum, which he inaugurated in 1852. For example:- The most important Italian born artisans includes Fyodor Bruni active under his reign during Romantic Period known for his history paintings including The Brazen Serpent (Bruni).

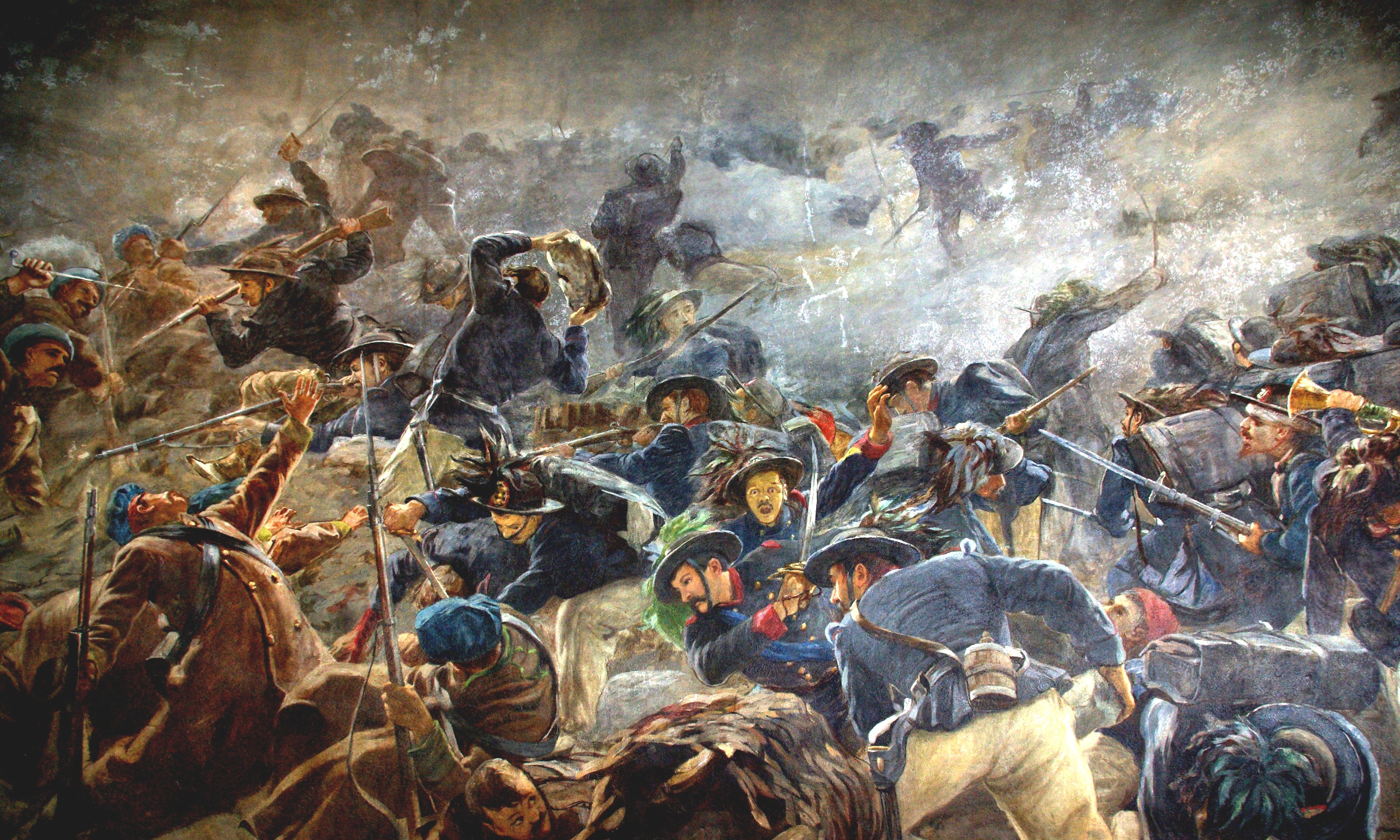
Italian Bersaglieri halt the Russian attack in the Battle of the Chernaya in 1855

Russia and the Kingdom of Sardinia were enemies in the Crimean War of 1853–1856.

In response to Italian unification, Russia broke off diplomatic relations with Sardinia-Piedmont (now the Kingdom of Italy) in 1861. However, relations were reestablished the following year.

As Poles and Italians supported each other's independence efforts against foreign empires in the 19th century, the Italian government allowed a Polish Military School in Genoa/Cuneo to provide training to Polish officers in exile in 1861–1862, who then fought in the Polish January Uprising in the Russian Partition of Poland in 1863–1864. The Italian volunteer Garibaldi Legion fought alongside Polish insurgents against Russia in the uprising, with General Francesco Nullo killed in the Battle of Krzykawka.

In 1909, Italy and Russia entered into a secret agreement known as the Racconigi Bargain. This agreement was concluded on October 24, 1909, at the Castle of Racconigi, Italy. The terms of the agreement included Italy's recognition of Russian interests in the Turkish Straits and Russia's recognition of Italian interests in Tripoli and Cyrenaica as significant diplomatic move for both countries. It facilitated Italy's preparations for the Italo-Turkish War two years later.

In 1914, Italy refused to follow its official allies, Germany and Austria-Hungary, into World War I. It negotiated for a better deal with the Allies, especially in terms of gaining territory from the Austria-Hungary. Russia had its own interest in that region, which complicated negotiations, but its negotiating position was greatly weakened by its heavy military losses. Britain and France managed to make Russia by April 1915 abandon its support for most of Serbia's claims and accept terms for Italy's entry into the war, which would limit Russia's strategic presence in the postwar Adriatic.

=== Italian-Soviet relations ===
In the Polish–Soviet War of 1919–1921, Italy supported Poland against Soviet Russia, and sold large amounts of weapons to Poland, including millions of rifles and bullets, 45 cannons and many uniforms.

The governments of Benito Mussolini's Fascist Italy and Joseph Stalin's Soviet Union recognized each other as de jure governments of their respective countries and established diplomatic relations on 7 February 1924, shortly after the death of Vladimir Lenin. A preliminary trade agreement had been made on 26 December 1921, which one historian noted the pact "signified the de facto recognition of the Soviet Union" by Italy. Both states signed a Treaty on Friendship, Non-Aggression and Neutrality on 2 September 1933, and although the treaty formally remained in effect until the Italian declaration of war against the Soviet Union on 22 June 1941, relations had already degraded with the advent of the Second Italo-Ethiopian War and the Spanish Civil War.

Palmiro Togliatti was the longtime leader of the Italian Communist Party from 1927 to 1964. He remained in Moscow when Mussolini's fascist government arrested all leading members of the Communist Party. The Comintern, under Stalin's guidance, chose Togliatti as the party leader for Italy. He remained in Moscow but kept the party solidly together. During World War II, he directed the Italian communist resistance and returned to Italy in 1944. Stalin did not permit the Italian communists to make an effort to take over Italy from 1944 to 1945. Togliatti kept in close touch with Moscow and became a major player in Italian politics. He was typically outmaneuvered by the Christian Democrats with their American allies.

In 1936, the League of Nations imposed economic sanctions on Italy for its aggression in Ethiopia. The Soviet Union publicly supported sanctions "as a matter of principle", and complied with the sanctions on specific commodities after they went into effect, but overall Soviet-Italian trade remained close to pre-sanctions levels. The sanctions only affected three products which the USSR exported to Italy (iron ore, manganese, and chromium), and Soviet exports of other goods increased during the sanctions period, so that total Soviet exports to Italy only dropped to 83.5% of their pre-sanctions levels, which was a slight reduction compared to other countries such as Britain which dropped its exports to 8.6%. Soviet oil sales to Italy increased during sanctions, and the Soviet Union also supplied 91% of Italy's import of oats, which were used to feed the horses of the Italian military. Soviet imports from Italy were small before the sanctions period and remained at similar levels.

Italy violated the pact for the second time by promptly responding to requests by the Republic of Finland for military assistance and equipment for use against the Soviet government. The Royal Italian Air Force (Regia Aeronautica Italiana) sent thirty-five Fiat G.50 fighters, while the Royal Italian Army (Regio Esercito Italiano) supplied 94,500 new M1938 7.35 mm rifles for use by Finnish infantry. However, the Soviet Union's new partner Germany intercepted most of Italy's aid and only released it once peace had been made. A handful of Italian volunteers also fought in the Winter War on the side of Finland.

In the late 1930s, Germany planned to gain Lebensraum by invading the Soviet Union with support from Italy, cooperation with Poland, friendship with Britain and the isolation of France. Italy was mildly supportive, but Hitler's program failed by Polish aloofness, British rejection of appeasement in 1939, Soviet strength, and the American entry to the war in support of the Soviets.

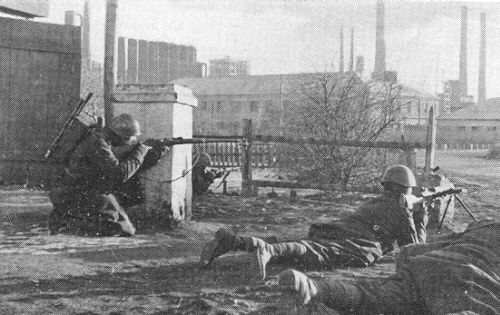
Italian troops fighting against the Soviets in Donetsk in 1941

Even during the German-Soviet war, when Italy was on Germany's side fighting against the Soviets, Italian troops were known for treating Soviet civilians much better than the Germans did. After the Italians signed an act of surrender to the Allies on 29 September 1943, at the Three Powers Conference in Moscow, the Soviets, the Americans and the British adopted the Declaration Regarding Italy for the overthrow of fascism in Italy, the barring of fascists from public life and the setting up "democratic organs". The Soviet Union restored full diplomatic relations with Italy on 25 October 1944. A treaty on trade and navigation was signed on 11 December 1948.

In the decisive 1948 election, both the Soviets and the Americans intervened. The communists launched strikes, mass rallies, assaults on police stations and occupations of factories. The Americans responded by threatening military intervention in the event of a communist coup. The Christian Democrats won on an anticommunist platform, the communists were frozen out of power at the national level in Italy although they still controlled local governments in industrial cities.

Between 1958 and 1968 Italy and Soviet Union relations were part of the changes in world politics between the end of Stalinism and the beginning of détente. A key role in the rapprochement was played by Amintore Fanfani, who in the decade 1958-1968 became Prime Minister three times and was responsible for Foreign Affairs three times. In these two roles, he was one of the most important architects of the orientation and management of Rome's international action in the decade.

In the decade 1958–1968, two moments stand out. The first phase covers the time span of the third legislature in Italy (1958–1963) and, on the Soviet side, the last five years of Khrushchev's leadership (he was dismissed in October 1964). During this five-year period, the foundations of bilateral relations were laid between Italy and the Soviet Union, in the economic, political, cultural and technical-scientific fields. A second phase, from the end of 1964 to 1968, was characterised in the USSR by the rise of the Brezhnev leadership and in Italy by the start of the organic centre-left with the Moro governments, within which Fanfani held the role of Foreign Minister on several occasions. This phase saw the stabilisation of bilateral relations as well as cooperation, though partial and limited, in the main international issues. A period of slowdown in bilateral relations occurred between the second half of 1963 and the end of 1964, not so much due to direct political choices as to a series of important events in Italian politics, in the Soviet government and in the international framework, which placed other priorities on the two capitals. In the space of little more than a year, in fact, in Italy the organic centre-left project was realised, the schism of the Italian Socialist Party was consummated and Palmiro Togliatti died, leaving the Italian Communist Party suddenly leaderless; in the USSR, Khrushchev was dismissed and Leonid Brezhnev's secretariat was installed; furthermore, international protagonists of détente such as Kennedy and John XXIII died.

Other than a few setbacks during the most acute international crises, Soviet diplomacy between 1958 and 1968 followed a rather linear policy towards Italy, which did not change even with the rise of Brezhnev's leadership. An assessment of the objectives achieved and the methods of action was outlined in a secret report by Moscow's ambassador in Rome Nikita Ryžov to Foreign Minister Gromyko in 1969, which reads as follows: “In recent years Italian-Soviet relations have improved significantly in all fields. The most obvious steps forward can be seen with regard to economic-commercial relations and technical-scientific relations, developed on the basis of the 1966-1969 long-term trade agreement [...] The embassy also believes that the Italian specificity is such that in the absence of a serious and stable economic basis at the root of Soviet-Italian relations, the possibilities of realising and developing a political action aimed at influencing Italian policy in our favour will be very limited. On the contrary, our exact assessment of Italy's economic interests - which in so many ways determine its foreign policy - could in certain circumstances yield the political result we need."

The USSR considered it opportune to establish political relations with Italy that also used other avenues, different from those of the PCI channel. This was the context for Moscow's attempt to establish direct relations with certain majority leaders and government exponents, an initiative that was to inaugurate a season of regular and frequent meetings. It is indicative, for example, that from 1959 to 1968 there was at least one state visit a year by a member of the Italian government to the USSR or of the Soviet government to Italy. Some were particularly significant for the resonance they had in bilateral relations, such as Gronchi's visit to the USSR in 1960 - during which the first Italian-Soviet cultural agreement was signed-, Fanfani's visit to Moscow in 1961 or Gromyko's visit to Italy in 1966.

The Soviet strategy of those years aimed at neutrality in Italian foreign policy. Italy actually maintained its Atlanticist positions but, on some issues, there was an Italian-Soviet ideological convergence such as the Berlin crisis of 1961 in which Fanfani was almost identified as a reliable spokesman and mediator of the crisis between the two superpowers.

Italy had the largest communist party in the Western world, with over 2 million members. After the Sino-Soviet Split, the party had much more room to manoeuvre. While not officially aligning with China, it sharply disagreed with the Soviets on numerous points. The historic compromise and the party's acceptance of pluralism at home, the Soviet invasion in Czechoslovakia, relations with the Chinese Communist Party, the Soviet invasion of Afghanistan and martial law in Poland. The Soviets offered concessions to win the party's support for their foreign policy. However, it denounced Soviet actions in Poland and suggested that both Soviet and American foreign policies were obnoxious, Pravda denounced the party's "blasphemy". The end of the Soviet Union made the party disintegrate in 1991 and split into the Democratic Party of the Left and the Communist Refoundation Party ("Rifondazione Comunista").

A strong political link between Italy and Soviet Russia was built during the existence of the Italian Communist Party, which was the second most popular political party from the 1950s to the early 1990s.

=== Post-advent of the Russian Federation ===
After the dissolution of the Soviet Union in 1991, Italy signed a friendship treaty with the Russian Federation first in 1994 and then in 1998. Meanwhile, the two countries intensified the economic and commercial relations. At the beginning of the new century, Russian Federation started regaining economic stability and generating interesting investment opportunities.

In 2006, Russia and Italy signed a protocol of cooperation to fight crime and defend civil liberties. There are close commercial ties between the two countries. Italy is Russia's second most important commercial partner in the EU, after Germany, and its state-owned energy company, ENI, has recently signed a large long-term contract with Gazprom to import Russian gas into Italy.

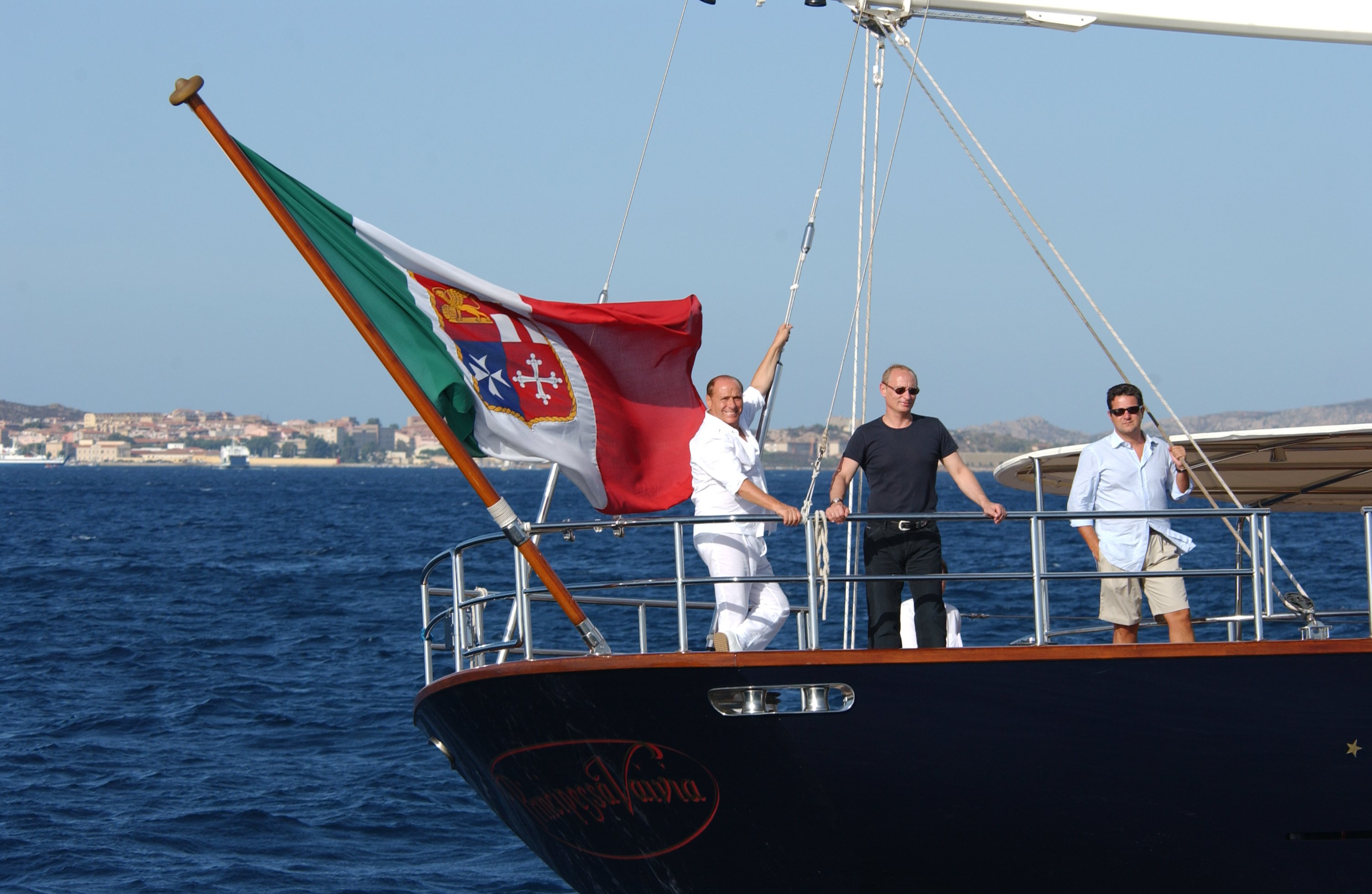
Vladimir Putin visiting Silvio Berlusconi's summer residence in Sardinia, August 2003.

The Silvio Berlusconi governments (2001–2006 and 2008–2011) strengthened Italy's ties with Russia by the Italian prime minister's personal friendship with Russian President Vladimir Putin.

Italy kept dialogue with Moscow even when relations with NATO countries began to crack. In 2007 and 2008 Italy was among the European countries (including France and Germany) most critical of the George W. Bush administration's (2001–2009) plan to deploy an anti-missile defense system in 'Eastern Europe, a measure the Russians opposed. Italy - with France and Germany - opposed the Bush administration's intention to offer Georgia and Ukraine the NATO Membership Action Plan (Map), the first step in the accession process, during the NATO summit in Bucharest of April 2008. The main reason was that the accession of Georgia and Ukraine would cause a deterioration in relations with Russia without bringing any appreciable security advantage to the Alliance.

In 2017, Putin's party United Russia, signed a deal with the Northern League to strengthen their political cooperation.

Former Italian Prime Minister Matteo Renzi, leader of the Democratic Party, suggested that Russian-backed organisations may have been promulgating fake news in Italy to influence electoral outcomes, and he accused the Five Stars Movement of spreading information supporting the Russian government and foreign policy. In December 2017, former US Vice President Joe Biden accused Russia of helping the opposition Five Stars Movement and Lega Nord.

In March 2018, the Italian government, led by Paolo Gentiloni, expelled two Russian diplomats after the Skripal poisoning case in the United Kingdom.

The parties that won the 2018 election in Italy and formed a coalition government, the Lega Nord and the Five Star Movement, have been giving voice to the Italian industry's discontent with American and European sanctions on Russia.

On 22 March 2020, after a phone call with Italian Prime Minister Giuseppe Conte, Putin ordered the Russian Army to deploy medics, special disinfection vehicles and other medical equipment to Italy, which was the European country to be most severely hit by the COVID-19 pandemic. The President of Lombardy, Attilio Fontana, and Italian Foreign Minister Luigi Di Maio expressed their gratitude to Russia. Following a COPASIR investigation, it emerged that the operation, which according to the Italian government was a humanitarian mission, could not have been planned in a few hours and the investigation found that the Italian government had known from the beginning that it would have to pay all the expenses of the mission. According to some analysts, Russia's medical aid was an attempt to shape positive perceptions of the country at a time of global uncertainty.

In 2021, in the continuation of the COVID-19 pandemic, commercial and cultural relations were good. From a political point of view, over the years, the relations between Russia and Italy remain strong despite Russia's annexation of Crimea and its military operation in Ukraine.

2021 saw an Italian naval captain arrested and subsequently jailed for 30 years for selling classified NATO documents to a Russian embassy employee. Two Russian embassy personnel were expelled.

When Mario Draghi formed his government in 2021, he took a clear stance in support of the EU and the West by expressing concern about civil rights violations in Russia. Draghi no longer mentioned Russia as a partner. Rather, it became an actor with which to engage a dialogue.

Relations deteriorated on February 24, 2022, with the invasion of Russian troops in Ukraine.

==== The Russo-Ukrainian War ====
The Russo-Ukrainian War, with the deployment of Russian troops along the entire border with Ukraine and the subsequent Russian invasion of Ukraine, led Italy to open a diplomatic channel to resolve the crisis. Italy has severely condemned the Russian aggression and expressed full support to Ukraine. The Russian aggression against Ukraine surprised and disconcerted Italy and European countries. Former Prime Minister Silvio Berlusconi also expressed shock at Vladimir Putin's decision to attack Ukraine but later on in October 2022 he began to defend the invasion by blaming Zelensky for the war.

Initially, Italy was opposed to applying harsh economic sanctions against Russia, also because they were much more penalizing economically for Italy itself than for Russia, however it had to adhere to the European plan of harsh but gradual economic sanctions against Russia.

Italian public opinion has been strongly shocked and worried by the attack on Ukraine, also because it considered this war as unjustified and unjustifiable, fratricidal between populations of Rus' origin and with the same Orthodox Christian religion. The significant presence of Ukrainian immigrants in Italy demonstrated in the Italian squares and churches for peace and to ask for support from Italy.

After the 2022 Russian invasion of Ukraine started, Italy, as one of the EU countries, imposed sanctions on Russia, and Russia added all EU countries to the list of "unfriendly nations". Italy joined other countries in spring 2022 in declaring a number of Russian diplomats persona non grata.

In October 2022 Giorgia Meloni became Prime Minister of Italy, previously an admirer of Russia she changed her stance condemning Russia's annexation of Ukrainian territory as illegal and confirmed Italy will provide long-term support to Ukraine.

In July 2023 Italy suspended their "golden visa" programme for Russian and Belarusian citizens, a system that had allowed a two-year residency in Italy by purchasing a house, investing, or donating money.

== Trade relations ==
Trade relations were fundamental in unblocking Italian-Soviet relations after the World War II.

The market of the Soviet Union presented itself to the Italian business world with opportunities for expansion, due to the size of the territory and the demand for goods by the population. Between 1960 and 1963, the USSR's exports to Italy rose from 92 to 127 million rubles, Italy's exports to the USSR from 81 to 121 million rubles.

There were three main commercial operations launched in the decade 1958-1968: the agreement with ENI to import oil from the USSR signed in 1960 (which was renewed in the following years); the 1966 agreement with FIAT to produce cars in Tolyatti (named after Togliatti.); the construction of the ENI gas pipeline to supply Italy with methane from Soviet fields, the negotiations for which began in the mid-1960s and ended in 1969.

From an economic point of view, Russia and Italy have established a strong cooperation, especially in the energy domain. This strategic partnership is founded on commercial and energy interests. Energy sales are the most important category in trade exchanges. The two countries have begun a cooperation in various other sectors, such as: the construction and automobile industries, but also aeronautics and military vehicles.

Trade relations between Russia and Italy experienced an increase this century, apart from during the 2008 financial crisis that provoked a serious contraction. Because of the economic crisis, there was a decrease in trade of about one third in 2019 (down to 18.5 million euros).

In 2021 Italy exported goods worth $8.65 billion to Russia, with valves being the top product. Russia exported $22.2 billion of goods to Italy with natural gas at $12 billion being the main item. Between 1995 and 2021 Italy exports have risen by an average of 4,35% p.a. whilst Russian exports have risen by 6.78% on average.

In Q1 2023 Italian exports fell to $1.3 billion, down 14% and Russian exports to $1.6 billion, an 80% fall. Italy will cease buying Russian gas by December 2023 and is complying with EU sanctions of Russian oil and refined oil.

== Agreements ==
Most of the relations between Russia and Italy are regulated by agreements stipulated between Russia and the European Union, of which Italy is part. But there are also some bilateral treaties currently in force between Italy and Russia.

=== Bilateral Investment Treaty Italy - Russian Federation ===
A Bilateral Investment Treaty (BIT) was stipulated between Italy and the Russian Federation and signed on 9 April 1996. It entered into force on 7 July 1997. The agreement regards the promotion and protection of foreign investments between the two parties. The initial duration was of 15 years with an automatic renewal of 5 years. The parties can unilaterally decide to terminate the treaty at any time, against a notification to the other party, but in this BIT there is also the “sunset clause” which guarantees that all investment made prior to the termination of the treaty continues to be protected during a certain period of time, most of the time 5, 10 or 20 years.

The agreement is currently in force and provides all rules and regulations about the investment between the contracting parties and also provides the definition of investment and investor which is crucial because only the investment and investor which falls within the definitions of the treaty are entitled to the protection provided by the treaty. The treaty provides also all the standards of treatment which have been negotiated between the parties; the agreement provides for National Treatment, Most-fevered-nation Treatment, Fair and Equitable Treatment, Full protection and security, Prohibition on unreasonable, arbitrary or discriminatory measures, Expropriation, Protection from strife, Transfer of funds, Prohibition of performance requirement, Umbrella Clause, Entry and sojourn of personnel. Additionally, the agreement provides the rules for dispute settlement, and there clarify the difference between the “State-State Dispute Settlement” and the “Investor-State Dispute Settlement”.

The start of the Russian invasion of Ukraine has changed the relations of the whole international community; there are many economic changes and foreign investment is no exception, and in the face of economic and political decisions by Russia and Western countries some alleged violation of the BIT between Italy and the Russian Federation could occur.

Russia has responded to the economic sanctions imposed by the Western governments by enacting or threatening counter measures. In the first place, Russia's ruling party announced draft legislation, expressly endorsed by President Vladimir Putin, about the “Nationalization Counter-measure” that will authorize Russian courts to place Russian companies with foreign shareholder (including from the European Union) into external administration (a reorganization under Russia's bankruptcy law, with an external manager immediately displacing current management) if they take steps to decrease, suspend, or wind down their operation. Additionally, Russia imposed the “Transfer Counter-measure” concerning the imposition of restriction on the ability of foreign investors to divest their shares in Russia subsidiaries and immovable property, as well as on the transfer of proceeds or other founds denominated in foreign currency without an express licence from the Russian government.

If Russia confirms all these measures, Italian investors in Russia could suffer large losses and disputes that would be settled through mediation or conciliation could arise, but if they don't work investors may claim compensation thanks to the clauses present in the BIT between Italy and Russian Federation.

=== Memorandum of understanding for collaboration in the health sector ===
A memorandum of understanding for collaboration in the health sector between the Italian Ministry of Health and the Ministry of Health of the Russian Federation was signed in Trieste on 26 November 2013. The duration of the Memorandum is 5 years with automatically renewal unless one of the parties decides to terminate the agreement.

This agreement has different fields of cooperation:

- Prevention of communicable and non-communicable disease
- Protection of maternal and child health
- E-health, telemedicine and other information and communication technologies applied in health
- Organisation of national health system, insurance system and related regulatory aspects
- Transplantation of organs, cells and tissues
- Introduction of innovative medical technologies and procedures
- Teaching methodologies in the health field

=== Agreement between Italy and the Russian Federation on dismantling of Russian nuclear weapons ===
The Agreement on Cooperation in the dismantling of nuclear weapons subject to a reduction in the Russian Federation in the field of cultural, technical, scientific, and economic cooperation was signed on 1 January 1993 and entered into force on 15 March 1995. The duration of the agreement was 5 years with tacit renewal.

Through this agreement, Italy pays and assists the Russian Federation in the dismantling of nuclear weapons subject to reduction according to the Treaty on the non-proliferation of nuclear weapons signed on 1 July 1968.

== Diplomatic missions ==
Russia has an embassy in Rome and consulates in Genoa, Milan and Palermo, and Italy has an embassy in Moscow, a consulate in Saint Petersburg, two consulate generals (in Ekaterinburg and Kaliningrad), and two embassy branches (in Samara and Volgograd).

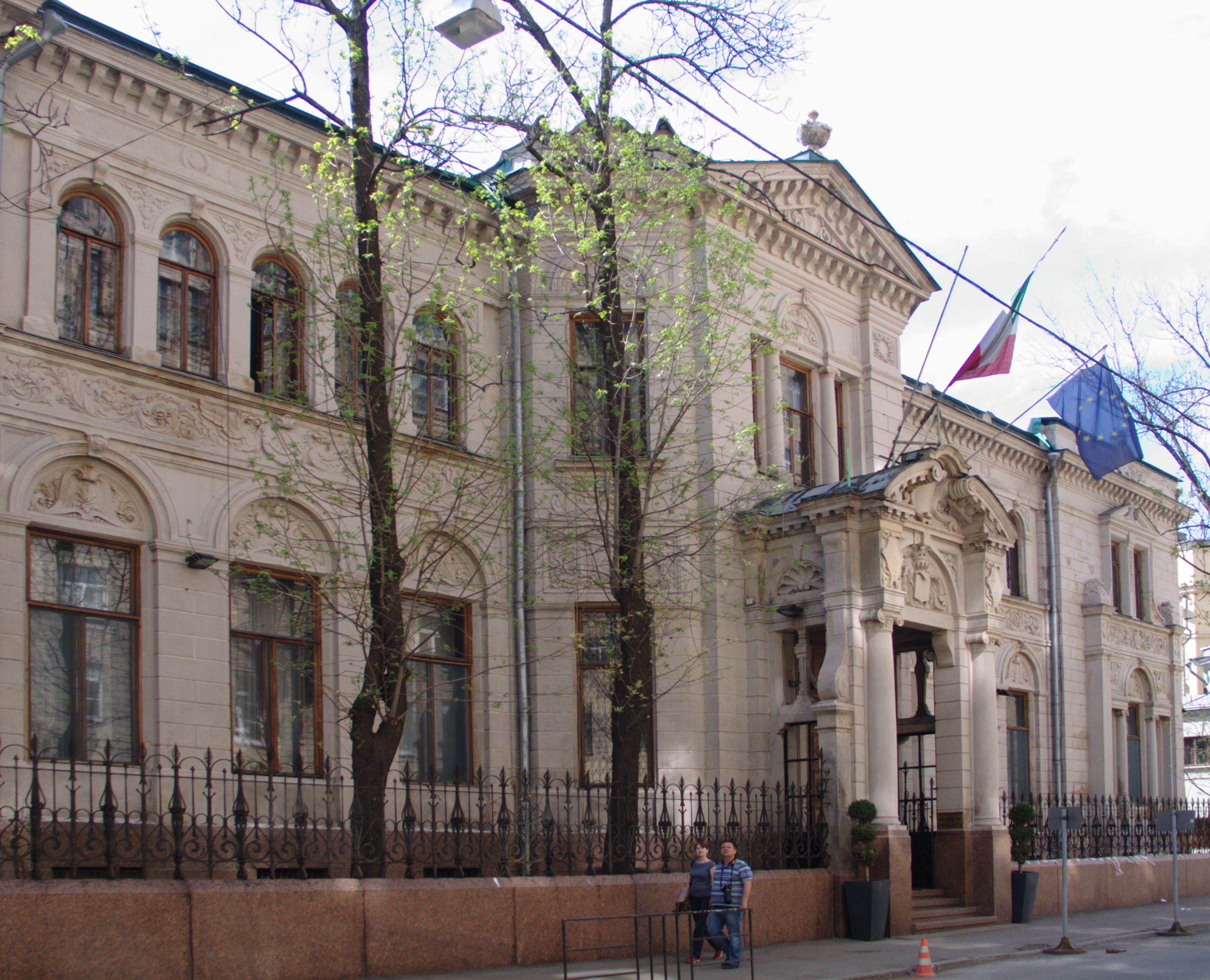
Embassy of Italy in Moscow

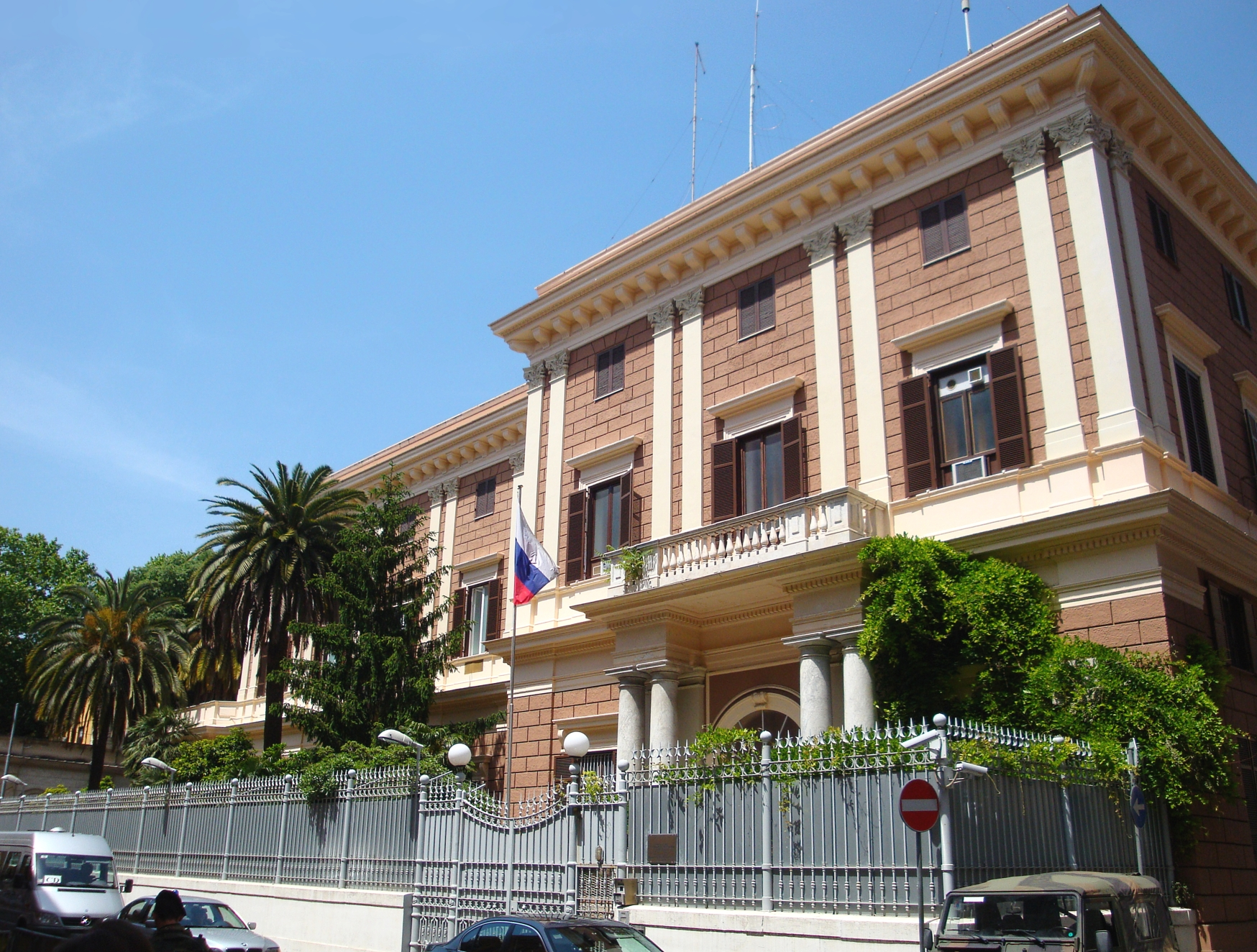
Embassy of Russia in Rome

== See also ==
- Foreign relations of Italy
- Foreign relations of Russia
- Scuola Italiana Italo Calvino
- Russia–European Union relations
- Capriccio Italien
