= Embassy of Italy, Moscow =

Coordinates: 55.7432°N 37.5877°E

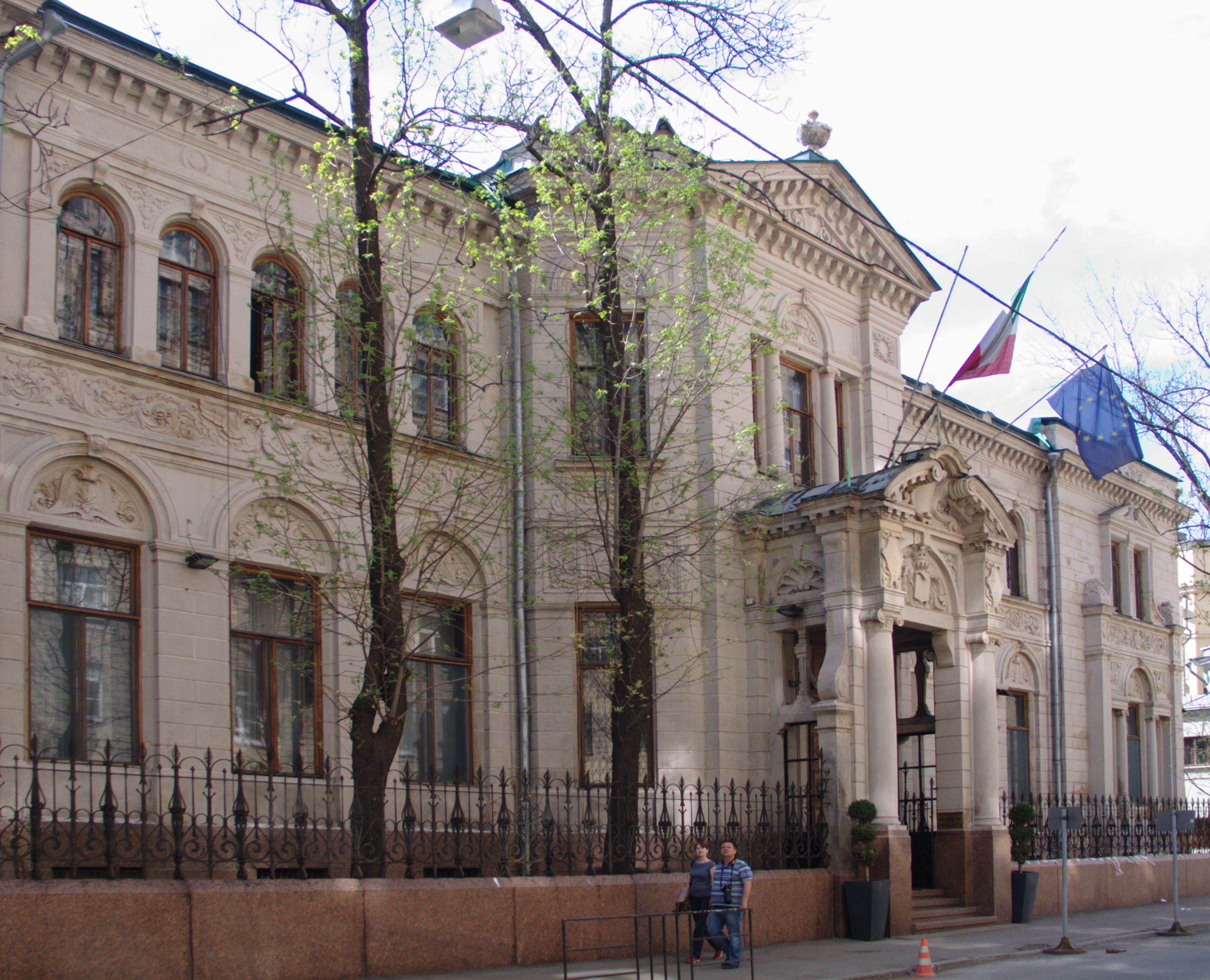
- Location: Moscow

The Embassy of the Republic of Italy in Moscow is the chief diplomatic mission of Italy in the Russian Federation. It is located at 5 Denezhny Lane (Russian: Денежный пер., 5) in the Khamovniki District of Moscow.

The Italian Embassy in Moscow is in the "Berg Villa", built in 1897 by the Russian merchant Sergei Berg. The building was assigned to the Italian Government in 1924.

== See also ==
- Italy–Russia relations
- Diplomatic missions in Russia

== Bibliography ==
- L'Ambasciata d'Italia a Mosca. Villa Berg (PDF) (in Italian). Torino: Umberto Allemandi & C. 2012. As described in Stefano Baldi. "Libri fotografici sulle Rappresentanze diplomatiche italiane all'estero".
