= Gagarinsky District, Moscow =

Gagarinsky District, Moscow Гагаринский район (Russian)
- District
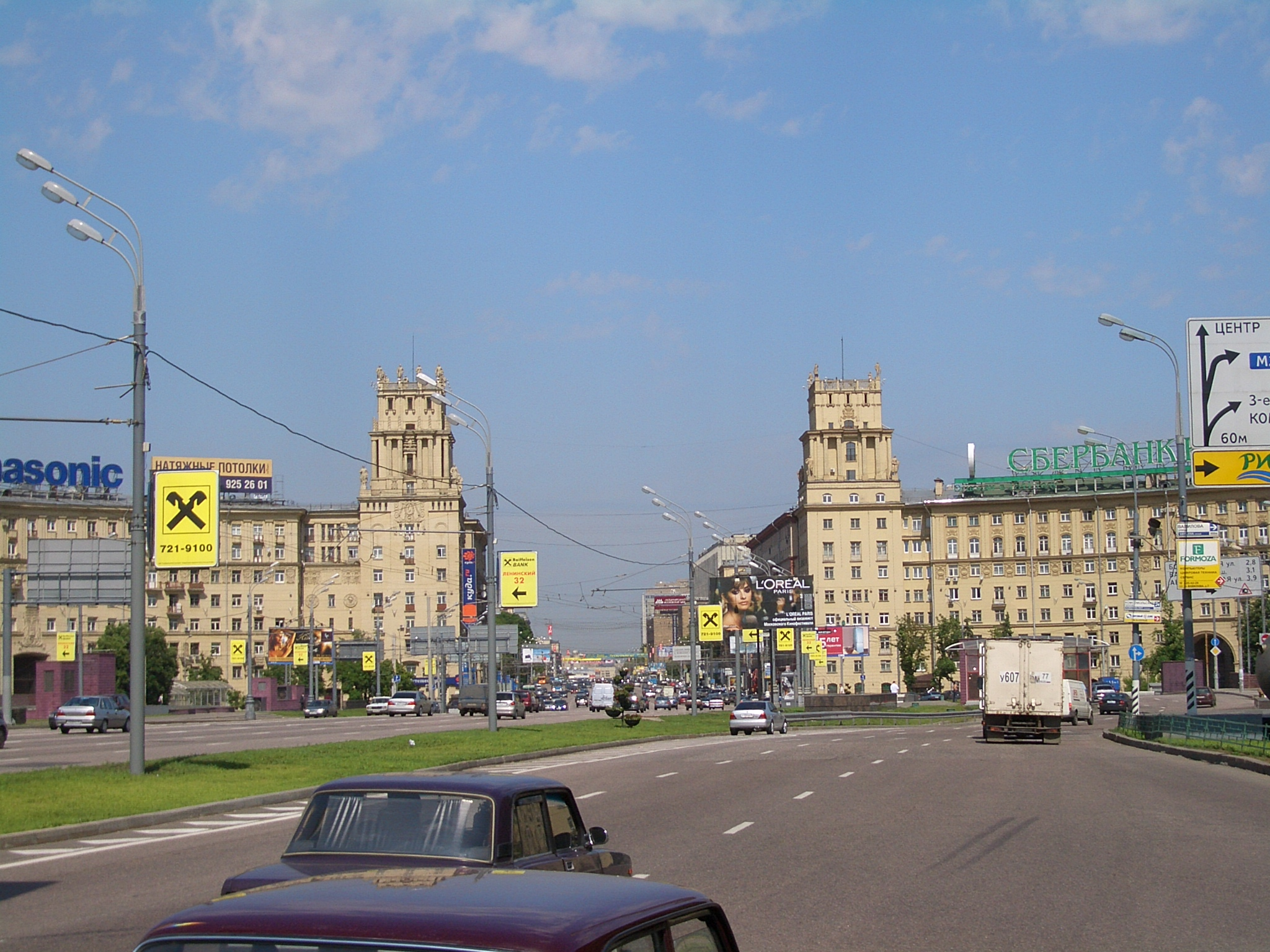
- Gagarin Square, Gagarinsky District

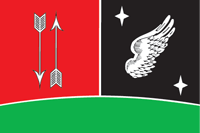
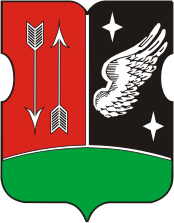
- Flag Coat of arms
- Location of Gagarinsky District, Moscow on the map of Moscow
- Coordinates: 55°42′12″N 37°33′47″E
- Country: Russia
- Federal subject: Moscow
- Time zone: UTC+
- OKTMO ID: 45398000
- Website: http://gagarin.mos.ru/

Gagarinsky District, Moscow (Russian: Гагаринский райо́н) is an administrative district (raion) of South-Western Administrative Okrug, and one of the 125 raions of Moscow, Russia. The area of the district is 5.50 square kilometers (2.12 sq mi). Population - 72,072. Established in 1995.

== Education ==
School No. 1 is in this district.

== Council of Deputies ==
In the Council of Deputies elections held on 10 September 2017, the Yabloko party won, receiving all 12 mandates.

Yelena Leonidovna Rusakova, a member of the regional council of the Moscow branch of the Yabloko party, was elected head of the Council of Deputies - the only deputy of the previous convocation who was re-elected to the council.

People's Artist of the USSR Armen Dzhigarkhanyan took part in district elections for the United Russia party. However, he could not receive a deputy mandate, taking 5th place in three-mandate electoral district No. 4.

Russian President Vladimir Putin is registered in the district; he voted in municipal elections at polling station No. 2151. The polling station is assigned to electoral district No. 2, and all mandates in this district were received by representatives of the Yabloko party. Soon after the elections, the head of the Gagarinsky District Administration was fired.

== See also ==
- Administrative divisions of Moscow
