= Vasili Razumovsky =

Russian surgeon

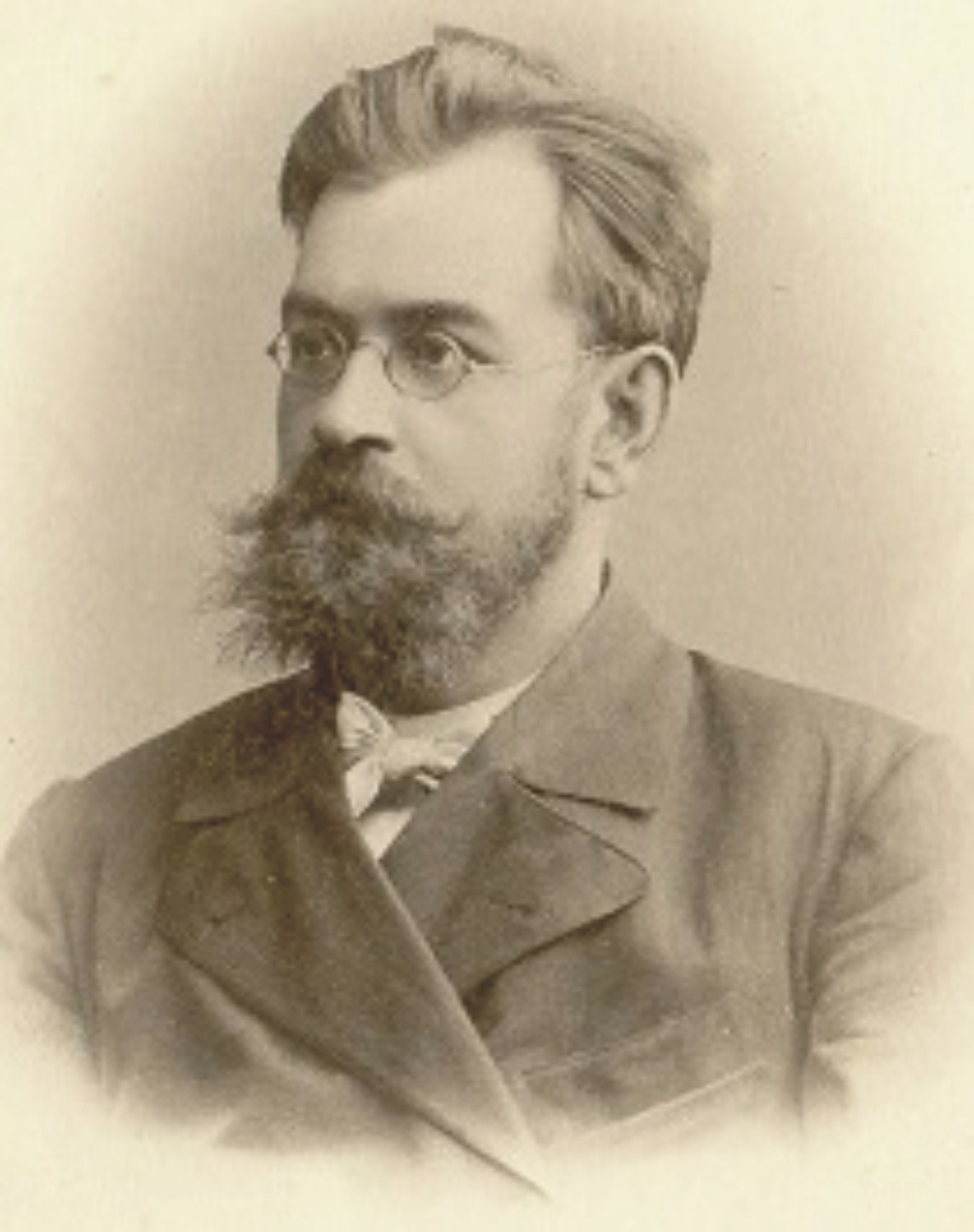
Razumovsky in 1909

Vasili Ivanovich Razumovsky (Russian: Василий Иванович Разумовский; 1857–1935) was a Russian and Soviet surgeon who was professor of surgery at Kazan University starting in 1887. Rasumovsky was among the founders of universities at Saratov (1909), Tbilisi (1918), and Baku (1919), and was the first rector of Baku State University (1919-1920). After 1920 he returned to Kazan University, and taught there until 1930.
