= Lomonosovsky District, Moscow =

Lomonosovsky District, Moscow Ломоносовский район (Russian)
- District
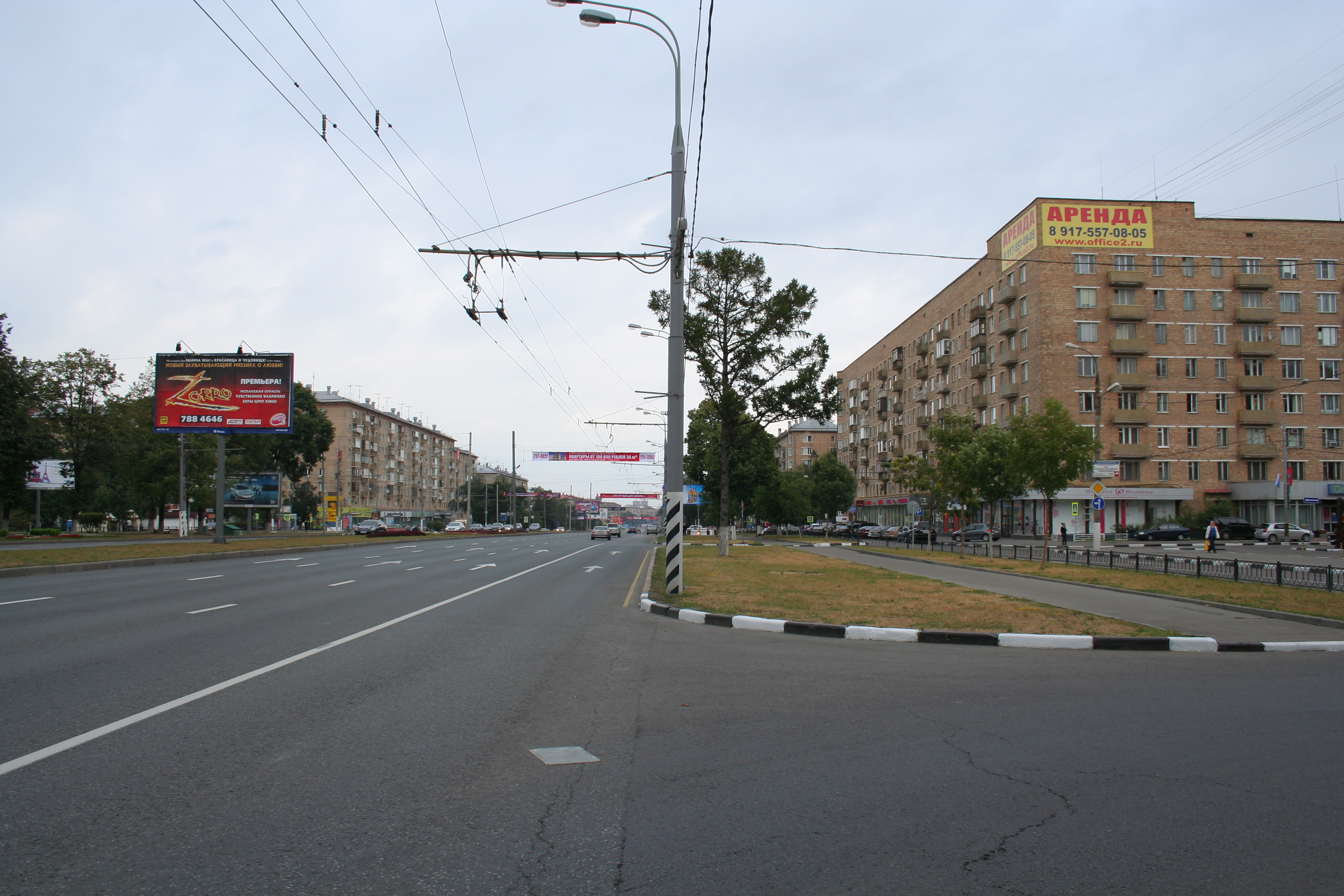
- Leninsky Avenue at Garibaldi Street, Lomonosovsky District

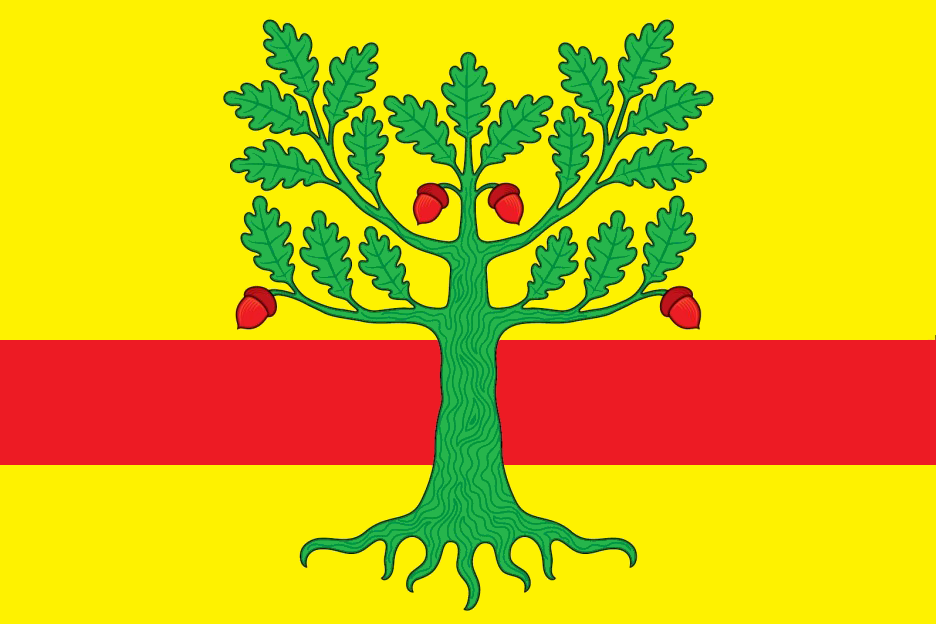
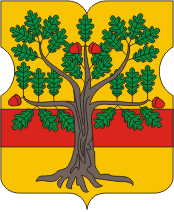
- Flag Coat of arms
- Location of Lomonosovsky District, Moscow on the map of Moscow
- Coordinates: 55°40′49″N 37°32′00″E
- Country: Russia
- Federal subject: Moscow

Area
  - Total: 3.34 km^{2} (1.29 sq mi)

Population
  - Estimate (2017): 85,000
- Time zone: UTC+
- OKTMO ID: 45904000
- Website: http://lomonosovsky.mos.ru/

Lomonosovsky District, Moscow (Russian: Ломоно́совский райо́н) is an administrative district (raion) of South-Western Administrative Okrug, and one of the 125 raions of Moscow, Russia. The area of the district is 3.34 square kilometers (1.29 sq mi). Population: 85,000 (2017 est.). Population - 81,851. Established at 1995. Named after Mikhail Vasilyevich Lomonosov.

== Education ==
The branch of the Moscow State Pedagogical University, The Moscow Finnish School, the Japanese School in Moscow, the Swedish School in Moscow, and the main campus of the Scuola Italiana Italo Calvino (Italian school) occupy a single campus in the district.

== See also ==
- Administrative divisions of Moscow
