= Kotlovka District =

- District
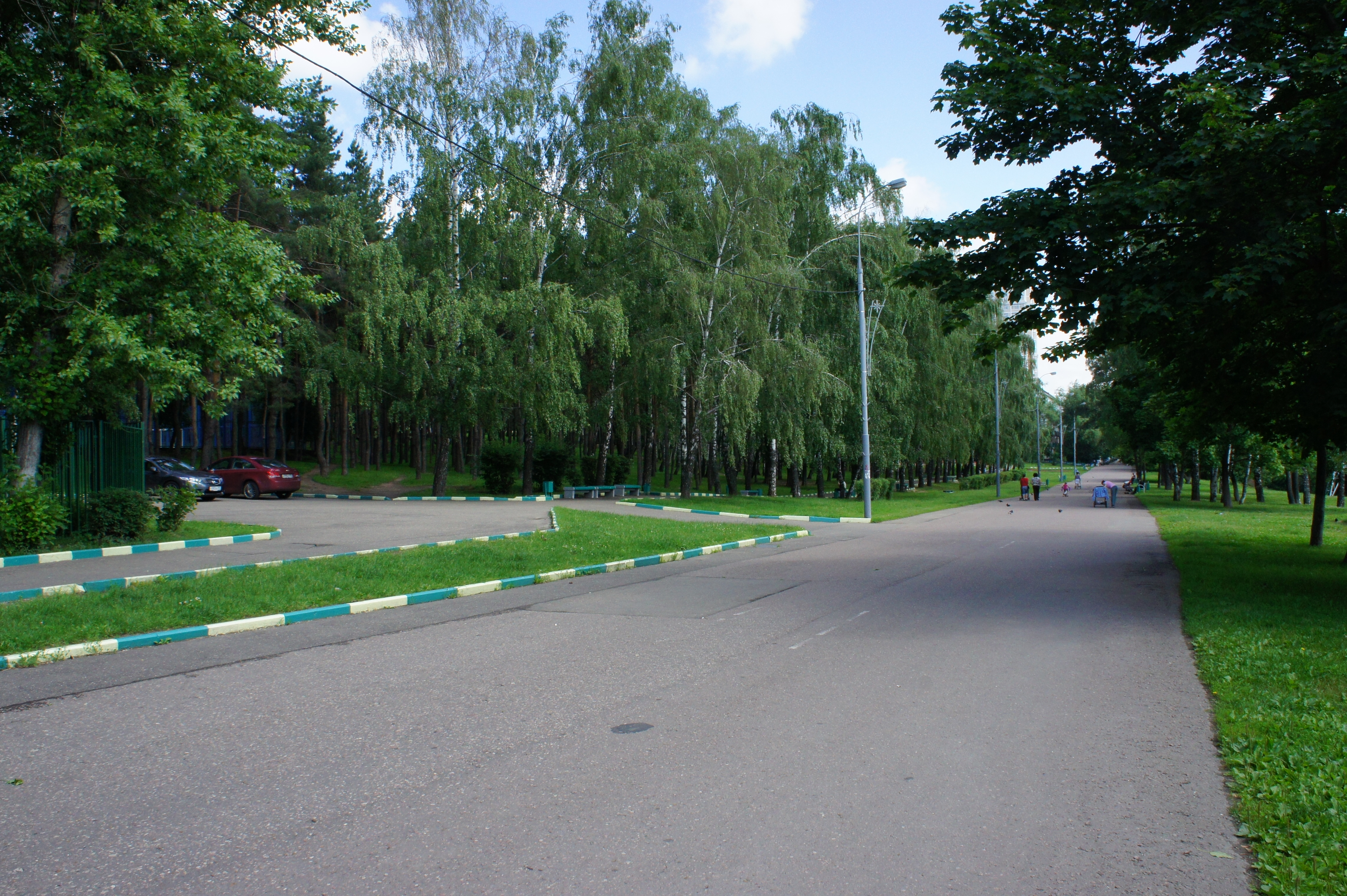
- Sosenki Park, Kotlovka District

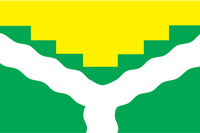
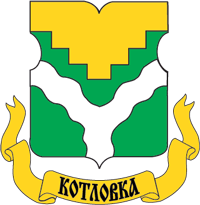
- Flag Coat of arms
- Location of Kotlovka District on the map of Moscow
- Coordinates: 55°40′27″N 37°35′55″E
- Country: Russia
- Federal subject: Moscow

Area
  - Total: 3.94 km^{2} (1.52 sq mi)

Population
  - Estimate (2017): 54,200
- Time zone: UTC+
- OKTMO ID: 45903000
- Website: http://kotlovka.mos.ru/

Kotlovka District (Russian: райо́н Котловка) is an administrative district (raion) of South-Western Administrative Okrug, and one of the 125 raions of Moscow, Russia. The area of the district is 3.865 square kilometers (1.492 sq mi). Population: 54,200 (2017 est.).

== See also ==
- Administrative divisions of Moscow
