= South-Western Administrative Okrug =

South-Western Administrative Okrug Юго-Западный административный округ
- Administrative okrug of Moscow
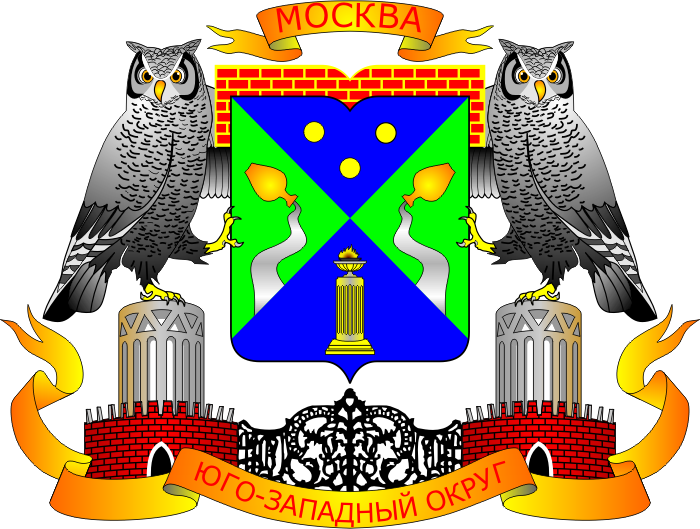
- Flag Coat of arms
- South-Western Administrative Okrug in Moscow
- Coordinates: 55°39′N 37°32′E
- Country: Russia
- Federal city: Moscow
- Established: 1991
- Districts: 12

Government
  - Prefect: Oleg Volkov

Area
  - Total: 111.4 km^{2} (43.0 sq mi)

Population (2010 Census)
  - Total: 1,362,751
- Website: http://uzao.mos.ru

South-Western Administrative Okrug (Ю́го-За́падный администрати́вный о́круг, Yugo-Zapadny administrativny okrug), or Yugo-Zapadny Administrative Okrug, is one of the twelve high-level territorial divisions (administrative okrugs) of the federal city of Moscow, Russia. As of the 2010 Census, its population was 1,362,751, up from 1,179,211 recorded during the 2002 Census.

== Territorial divisions ==
The administrative okrug comprises the following twelve districts:

- Akademichesky
- Gagarinsky
- Zyuzino
- Konkovo
- Kotlovka
- Lomonosovsky
- Obruchevsky
- Severnoye Butovo
- Tyoply Stan
- Cheryomushki
- Yuzhnoye Butovo
- Yasenevo

== Economy ==
Gazprom maintained its main Moscow offices for decades at 16 Nametkina Street (Cheryomushki District) before corporate headquarters functions shifted to the Lakhta Center in Saint Petersburg; the company continues to operate offices in Moscow.

The head office of Gazprombank (JSC) is located at 16 Nametkina Street, underscoring the okrug’s role as a corporate hub.

RusHydro’s executive body (headquarters) is in Moscow at 7 Malaya Dmitrovka Street; the company maintains group operations across the city.

== Education ==
The Moscow Finnish School, the Japanese School in Moscow, the Swedish School in Moscow, and the main campus of the Scuola Italiana Italo Calvino (Italian school) occupy a single campus in Lomonosovsky District.

Hinkson Christian Academy is also in the district at “ul. Novocheremushkinskaya 39, k.3, Moscow, 117218” (nearest metro: Profsoyuznaya).
