= Russian government response to the COVID-19 pandemic =

The government of Russia has initially responded to the COVID-19 pandemic in the country with preventive measures to curb the spread of the coronavirus disease 2019 in the country, which involved imposing quarantines, carrying raids on potential virus carriers, and using facial recognition to impose quarantine measures. Measures to prevent a crisis in Russia include banning the export of medical masks, random checks on the Moscow Metro, and cancellation of large-scale events by schools. The Russian government has also taken measures to prevent foreign citizens from heavily affected countries from visiting Russia. Local governments have also responded to the pandemic by imposing their own preventive measures in their communities.

== Background ==
On 12 January, the World Health Organization (WHO) confirmed that a novel coronavirus was the cause of a respiratory illness in a cluster of people in Wuhan, Hubei, China, who had initially come to the attention of the WHO on 31 December 2019. Compared to SARS of 2003, the case fatality ratio for COVID-19 has been much lower, but the incubation period and transmission have been significantly greater, resulting in a significant total death toll.

On 31 January, first two cases in the country were confirmed, one in Tyumen, Tyumen Oblast, and another one in Chita, Zabaykalsky Krai. Both were Chinese nationals. There were no other confirmed cases until 2 March when the first case in Moscow was confirmed. On 19 March, the first death of a patient with confirmed COVID-19 was reported in Moscow. The victim was identified in the media as Valentina Zubareva, professor at the Gubkin University, she had contracted the disease in Russia. The first two confirmed deaths were recorded on 25 March in Moscow.

== National measures ==
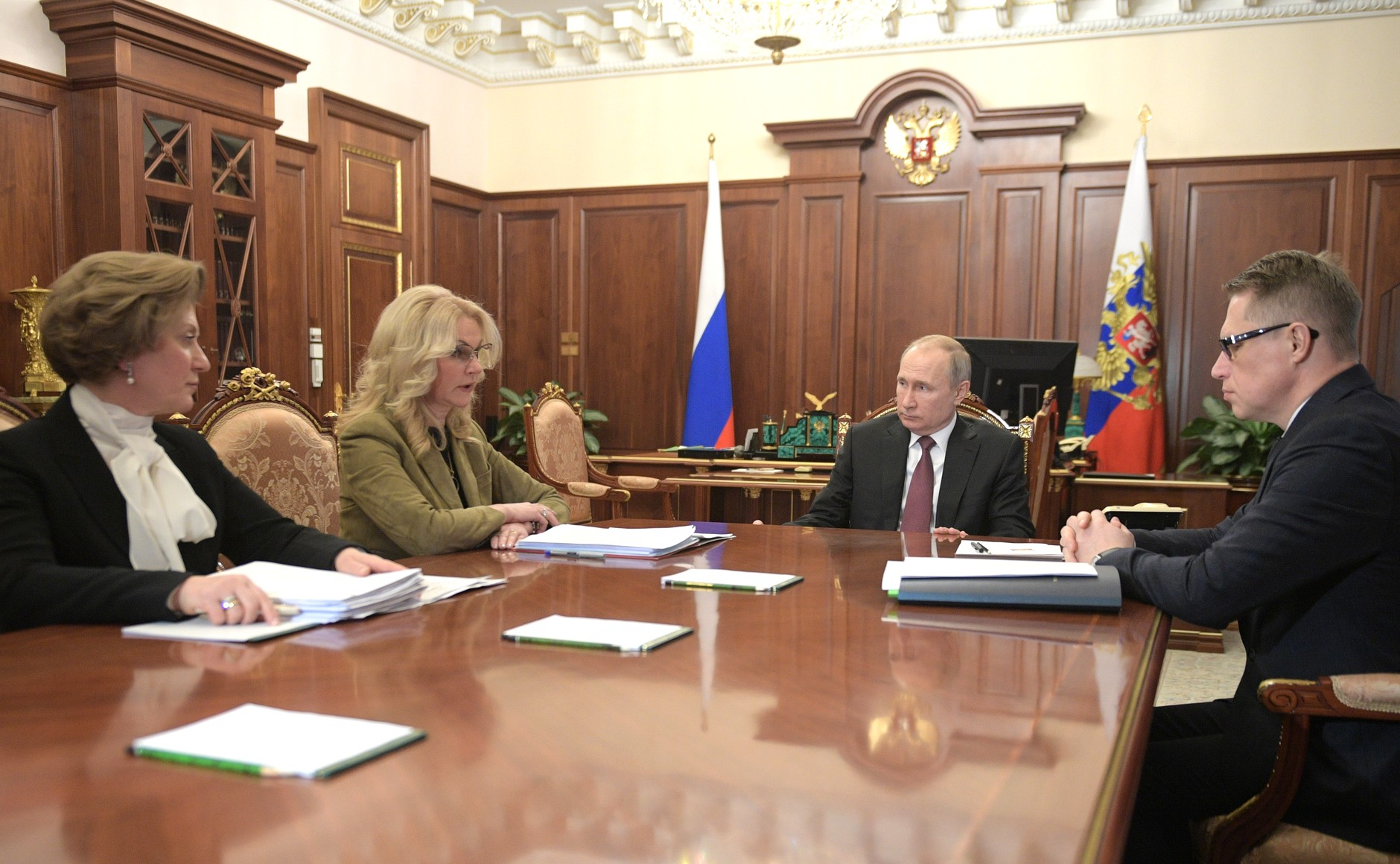
On 29 January, Russian President Vladimir Putin held a meeting on measures to counter the spread of coronavirus in Russia.

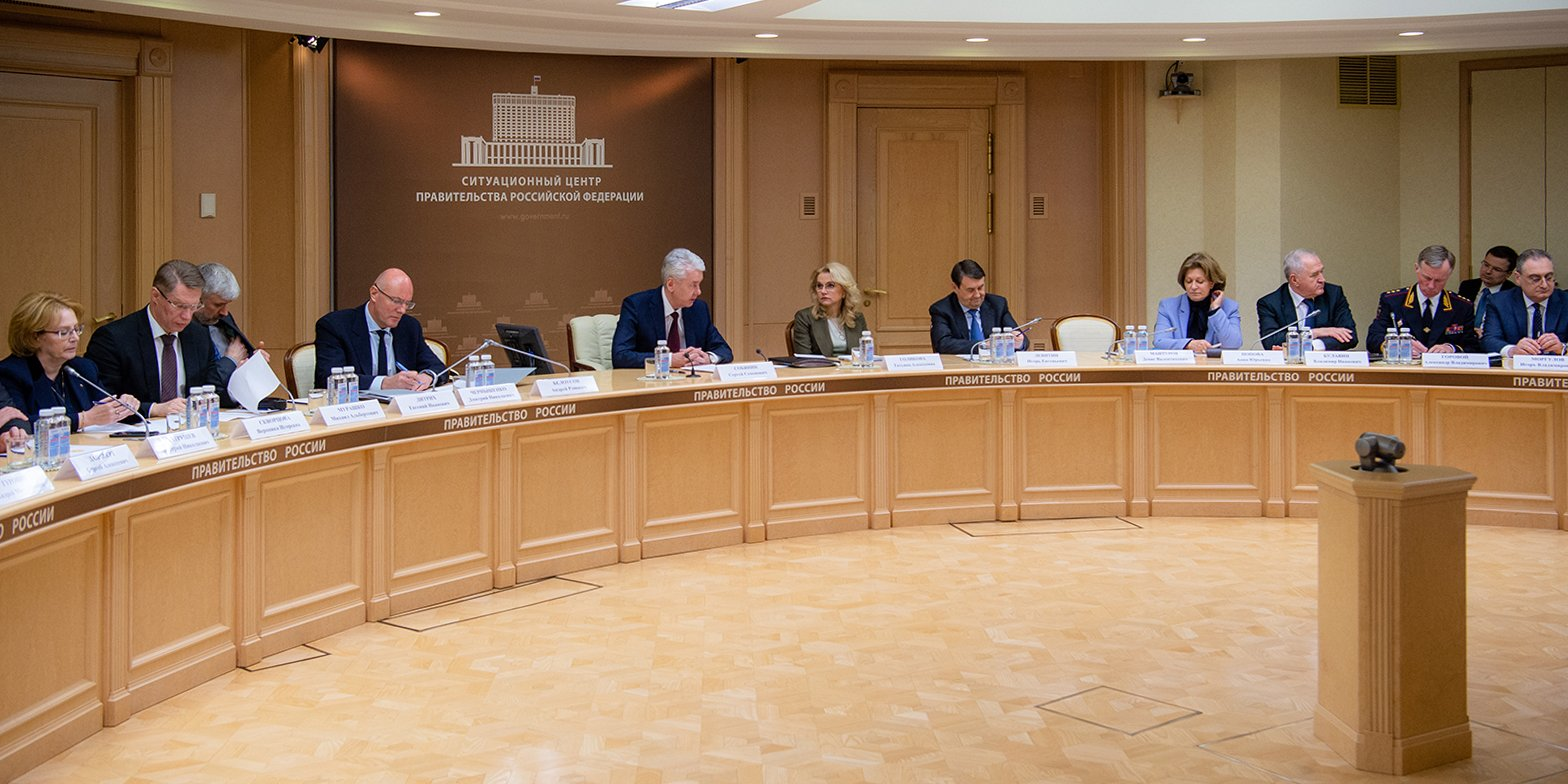
On 16 March, Mayor of Moscow Sergey Sobyanin held the first meeting of the State Council working group on countering the spread of coronavirus.

The Russian consumer health watchdog Rospotrebnadzor advised tourists to refrain from visiting Wuhan and stay away from Chinese zoos and markets selling animals and seafood. The agency also said that development of a vaccine against the virus was underway, relying on the WHO's recommendations.

A total of 144 Russians were evacuated from Wuhan, the initial centre of the outbreak, and were quarantined in Tyumen Oblast for two weeks from 5 February.

On 24 March, Moscow Mayor Sergey Sobyanin told President Putin at a meeting that "a serious situation is unfolding" and that the relatively low number of confirmed cases could be due to a low level of testing, saying that "there are far more people who are infected" and that the number of people in Moscow suspected of having the coronavirus was about 500.

A number of venues and parks in Russia including Crocus Expo, Exhibition of Achievements of National Economy and Patriot Park in Moscow and Lenexpo in Saint Petersburg were turned into temporary hospitals.

=== Testing ===
On 24 January, the first testing systems were developed and deployed to laboratories around the country.

As of 23 March, Russia had 4 testing systems and had carried out over 165 thousand tests for the virus which is among the highest testing numbers in the world. Two private lab companies started testing on 26 March. According to Deputy Prime Minister Tatyana Golikova, as of 25 March 141 state laboratories were conducting tests in 79 federal subjects. There are plans to increase the number of reference centres across the country to 15. On 27 March, the Federal Service for Surveillance in Healthcare (Roszdravnadzor) registered two more test systems. In Moscow on 21 March the average of those tested was low at 35 years and starting to rise to 37–39 years.

On 9 April, Russia passed the 1 million test mark and in addition to the laboratories of Rospotrebnadzor 200 state medical laboratories and 22 private laboratories are carrying out testing. There is a drive to further expand testing with any laboratory being able to carry out tests by submitting a notification to the central website.

On 27 April, Russia passed the 3 million test mark. On 28 April Anna Popova head of Federal Service for Surveillance in Healthcare (Roszdravnadzor) in a presidential update stated that there were now 506 laboratories testing and that 45% of those tested have no symptoms with the number having pneumonia reducing from 25% to 20% and only 5% of patients with a severe form. 40% of infections were from family members. The speed of people reporting illness has improved from 6 days to the day people find symptoms. Antibody testing was carried out on 3,200 Moscow doctors and 20% have immunity.

Russia continued to have the 2nd highest rate of testing in the world with 4.1m tests at 3 May, 5.2m tests at 9 May, 6.1m tests at 14 May, 7.1m tests on 18 May, 9m tests on 26 May and 10m tests on 29 May.

Dr. Melita Vujnovic, the World Health Organization's representative in Russia, stated that Russia, in accordance with WHO recommendations, "started testing literally at the end of January." Coronavirus testing in Russia was provided by the State Research Center of Virology and Biotechnology VECTOR in Novosibirsk and had to be verified there. There was concern that the tests may have insufficient sensitivity, despite the fact that the tests were verified in China since early February, showed the degree of sensitivity similar to or higher than other tests and the lab has been approved by the World Health Organization. Since 23 March, European Russia doesn't send their batches to Novosibirsk for verification, verifying them instead in a Moscow reference centre.

==== Asymptomatic test study for antibodies ====
In a study announced on 14 May, 5.6% of symptomless patients in St. Petersburg had detectable levels of antibodies to coronavirus. The study covered 1,276 coronavirus-positive volunteers aged from 11 to 93 with no COVID-19 symptoms. The study was carried out by Virology Center of St. Petersburg's Hospital No 40 who have carried out 22,000 coronavirus tests since the study started on 1 April. Antibody testing was carried out on the basis of enzyme-linked immunoassay. The announcement stated "The idea is that many hope that after having mild forms of the disease they could be spared from it. Practice however shows that it is not so. So, people should not relax. The immunity stratum is not that thick,"

=== Travel and entry restrictions ===
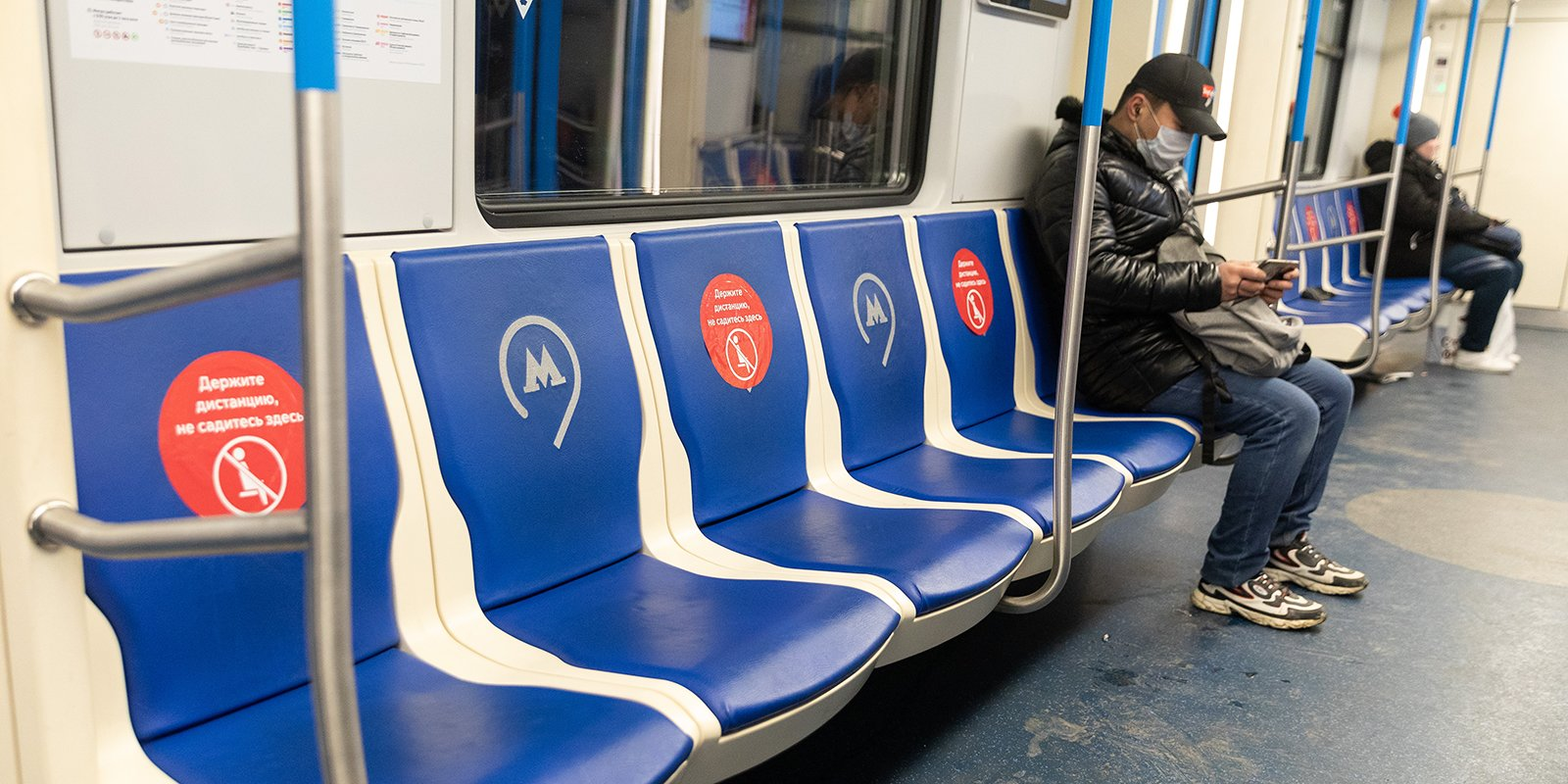
Social distancing signs in the Moscow Metro on 1 April

On 23 January, the Russian city of Blagoveshchensk, near the Chinese border, limited access to the country. Cultural exchange and official visits to China were cancelled. The Governors of the Amur Oblast Vasily Orlov, and of the Penza Oblast Ivan Belozertsev, called on residents to abandon trips to China altogether. Residents of large cities were told to avoid contact with tourists from China.

On 31 January, Deputy Prime Minister Tatyana Golikova said Russia will restrict the entry of foreigners arriving from China, except for flights to Moscow Sheremetyevo Airport.

On 20 February, the entry of Chinese citizens was banned. The temporary suspension is for Chinese citizens entering Russia for employment, private, educational and tourist purposes.

On 28 February, Moscow announced that it would deport 88 foreigners for allegedly violating quarantine measures. Russia barred Iranian citizens from entering Russia and said it would also restrict the entry of South Korean citizens from 1 March. Flights between Russia and South Korea are suspended, except for those operated by Aeroflot and Aurora.

On 4 March, Russia suspended its train service from Moscow to Nice, France. Aeroflot suspended flights to and from Hong Kong on 9 March.

Flights to and from Italy, Germany, France and Spain are limited since 13 March. Russia also stopped issuing tourist visas to Italian citizens and closed the border to Italian citizens and foreigners coming from Italy.

On 15 March, the land borders with Norway and Poland were closed to all foreigners. Russian Railways announced it would stop passenger trains from Moscow to Berlin and Paris. Earlier it was announced that train connections to and from Ukraine, Moldova and Latvia would be suspended because those countries had closed their borders.

Since 16 March, flights to and from the European Union, Norway and Switzerland were limited to regular flights between capital cities (Geneva in the case of Switzerland) and Moscow Sheremetyevo Airport, and charter flights. Prime Minister Mikhail Mishustin announced that the border with Belarus has been closed for the movement of people and an entry ban for foreigners will be imposed from 18 March to 1 May. On 17 March, Ministry of Foreign Affairs said Russian embassies and consulates had stopped issuing all types of visas, including e-visas, with exceptions for diplomats, people attending funerals and transit passengers.

On 23 March, Russia restricted air travel from all over the world, except for certain flights from Moscow to major capitals, and charter flights intended to move foreign citizens to their respective countries and Russian nationals back to Russia, until everyone is evacuated.

On 25 March, the Russian government loosened the travel ban to allow the entry for relatives of Russian citizens.

All regular and charter international flights were suspended on 27 March, except for those aimed at bringing Russians home.

On the same day, Grozny Airport refused to receive passengers without permanent or temporary registration in Chechnya.

Following a request from the Government of Moscow, BlaBlaCar carpooling service decided to suspend its activities across Russia starting from 30 March.

On 28 March, the Russian government decided to close all automobile, railway, pedestrian, river, or other border checkpoints, including on the Belarus border, with exceptions similar to that of the air travel restrictions. The ban must be enforced on 30 March.

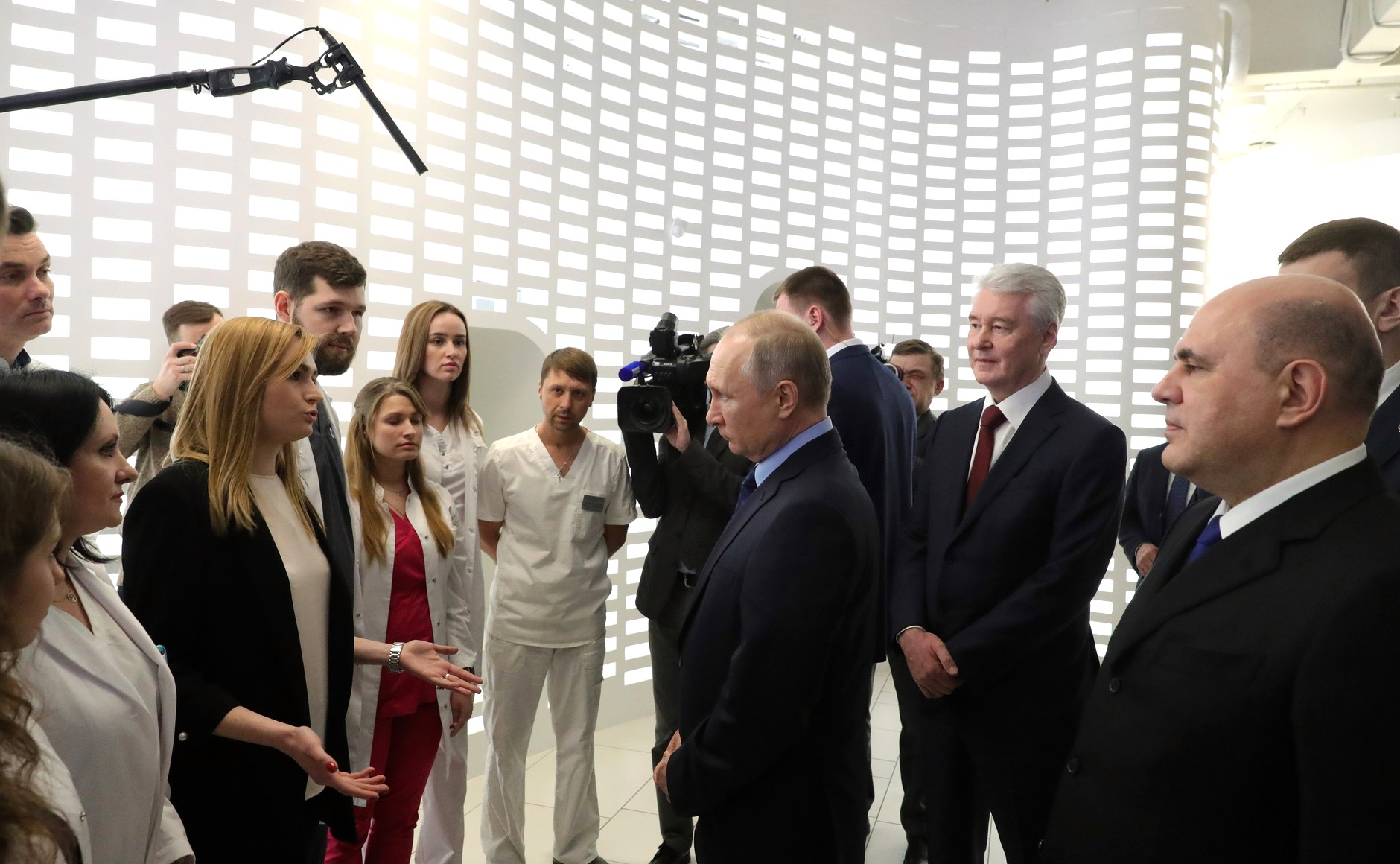
In a 24 to 27 April poll by the Levada Center, 48% of Russian respondents said that they disapproved of Vladimir Putin's handling of the coronavirus pandemic.

=== Other measures ===
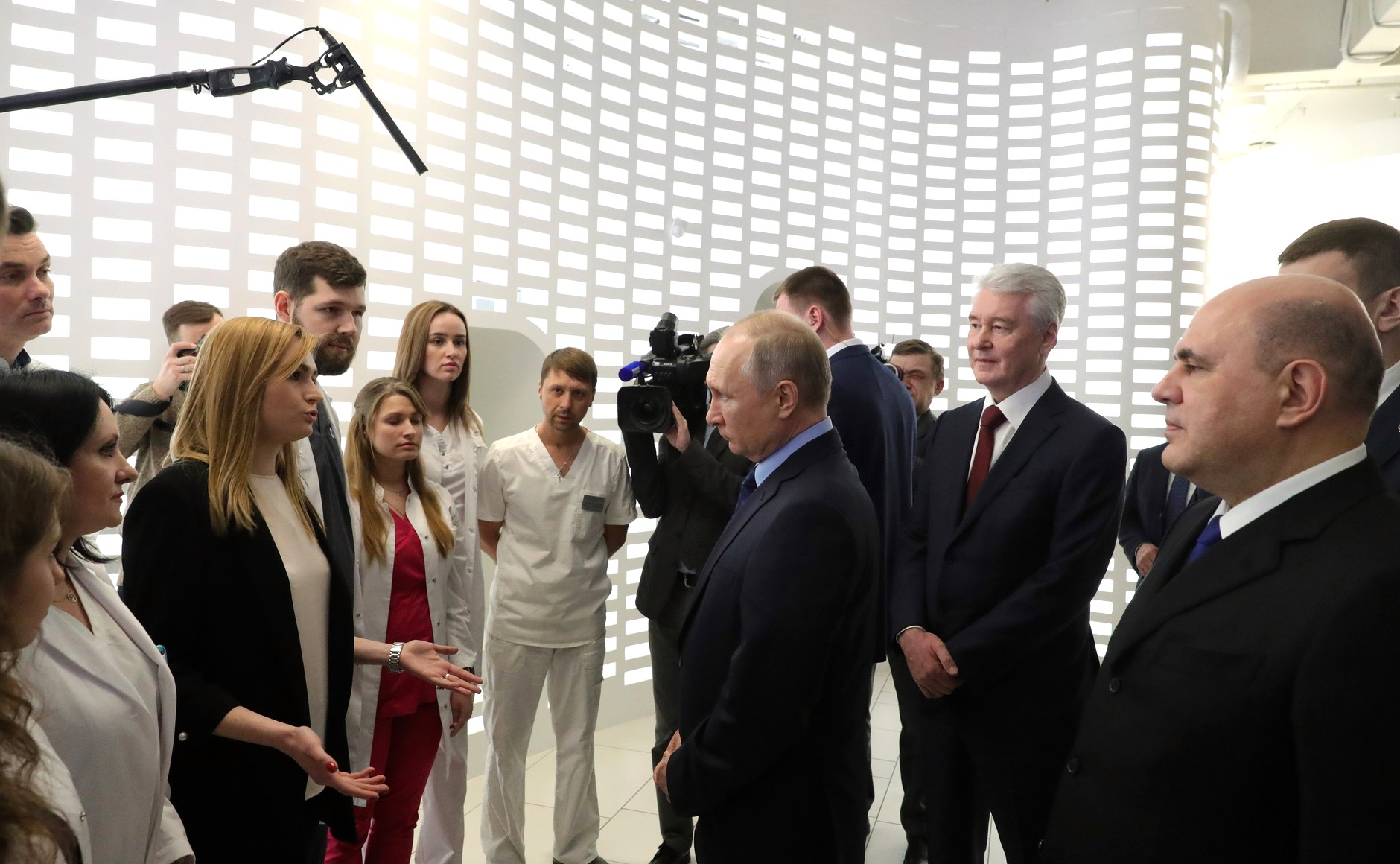
President Putin, Prime Minister Mikhail Mishustin and Moscow Mayor Sergey Sobyanin visited the Coronavirus Monitoring Centre on 17 March.

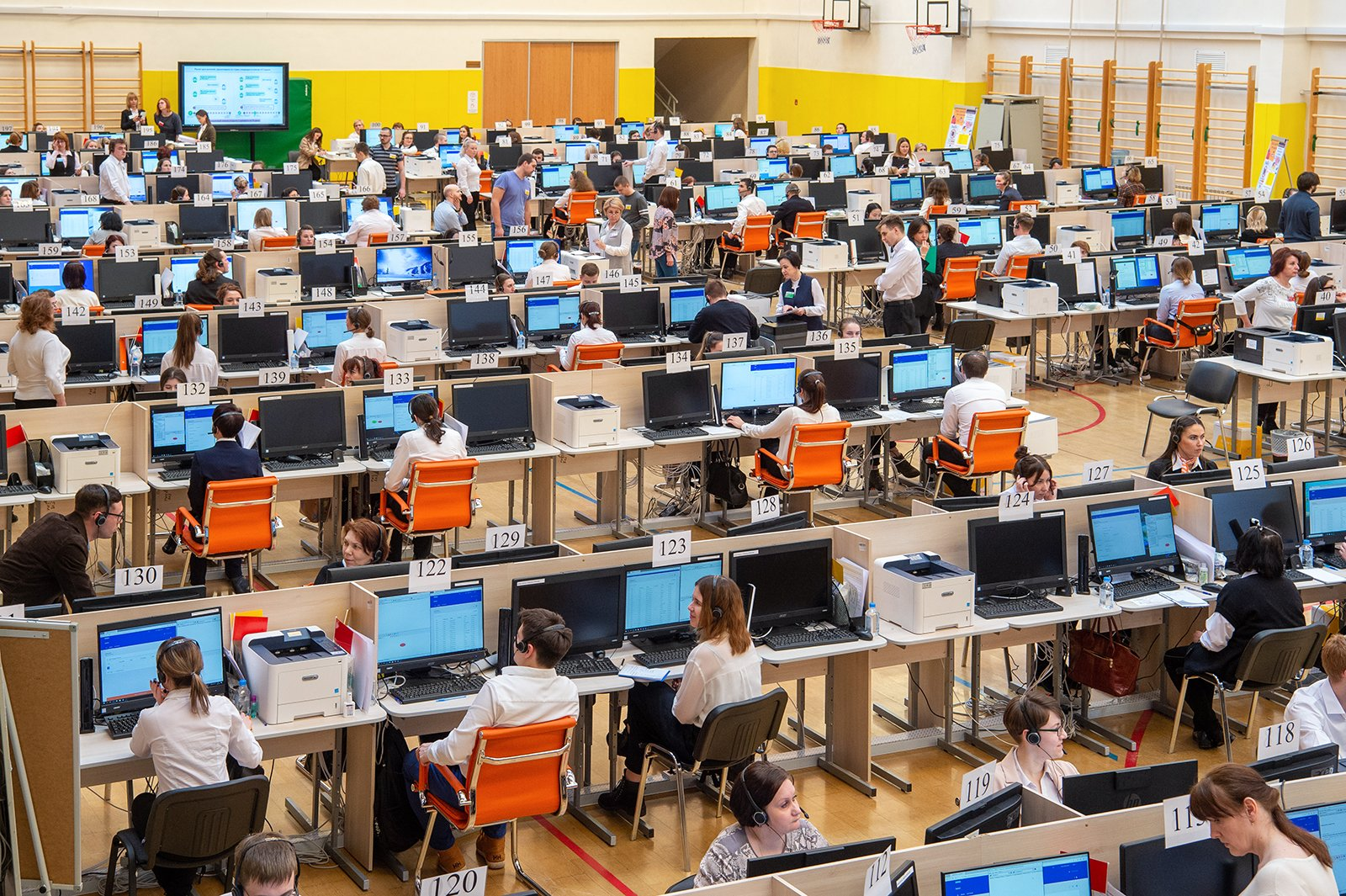
Call centre for the coronavirus situation in Moscow at Khodynsky Boulevard located in the gym of school No. 1409

On 14 and 15 March, Ministry of Education and Ministry of Science and Higher Education recommended regions to adopt distance learning if it becomes necessary.

On 17 March, Ministry of Culture announced closing all cultural institutions under its jurisdiction, including museums, theatres, symphonies, and circuses. On the same day, President Vladimir Putin said that the situation was "generally under control".

On 18 March, Minister of Education Sergey Kravtsov announced that all Russian schools would be closed from 23 March to 12 April.

On 19 March, Russia's Chief Sanitary Doctor, Anna Popova, required all people arriving from abroad to undergo a two-week self-isolation. Russian courts stopped considering all but most urgent cases because of the pandemic until 10 April.

On 24 March, the Russian government adopted a number of decisions, including an instruction to regional authorities to suspend activities of any nightclubs, cinemas, children's entertainment centres, and to ban hookah smoking at any restaurants or cafes. The Central Bank recommended all the banks to keep the money for 3–4 days before giving it to clients or loading it into ATMs, and to restrict usage of cash recycling ATMs.

On 25 March, President Putin, in a televised address to the nation, announced that the 2020 Russian constitutional referendum would be postponed due to the coronavirus. He added that the next week would be a nationwide paid holiday and urged Russians to stay at home. Putin also announced a list of measures of social protection, support for small and medium-sized enterprises, and changes in fiscal policy.

On 26 March, Minister of Science and Higher Education Valery Falkov ordered all universities to close from 28 March to 5 April.

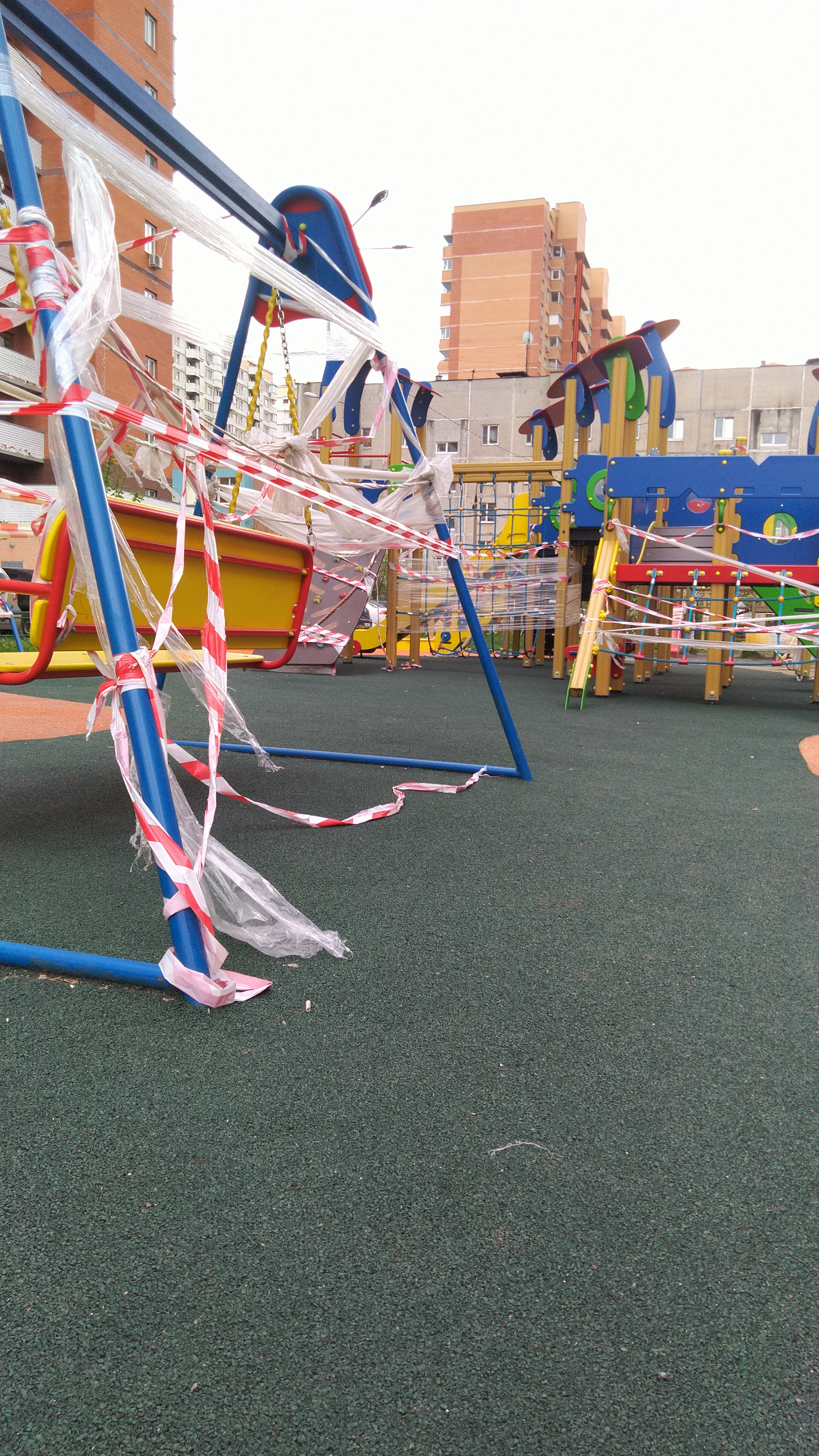
Children's playground during June, 2020 wrapped up into a barricade tape

On 27 March, as a follow-up to Putin's address to the nation, Prime Minister Mikhail Mishustin ordered all reservations at pensions or holiday houses to be cancelled from 28 March to 1 June, recommended regional authorities to close all the pistes at resorts for the same period, instructed them to force all the public eating places (except for delivery services) to suspend activities from 28 March to 5 April, and recommended that citizens refrain from travelling. On the same day, the Ministry of Education announced the postponement of the Unified State Exam from the end of May to the beginning of June.

On 30 March, as Moscow and Moscow Oblast declared a lockdown, Mishustin urged all regions to follow the example and take similar measures. He also announced a bill that would raise fines for breaching quarantine requirements.

On 31 March, the Federal Assembly approved a law allowing the executive cabinet to declare a state of emergency on its own. Previously, only a commission led by the Minister of Emergency Situations could do that.

On 1 April, Prime Minister Mishustin and the Minister of Communications Maxut Shadayev announced creating a system of tracking quarantine violation based on data of mobile network operators. Violators will receive a text message, and if they breach it systematically, the information will be sent to the police.

On 2 April, President Putin extended the non-working period to 30 April.

=== Lockdowns ===
Map of federal subjects that have announced the "self-isolation regime": Stay-at-home order Partial restrictions or recommendations

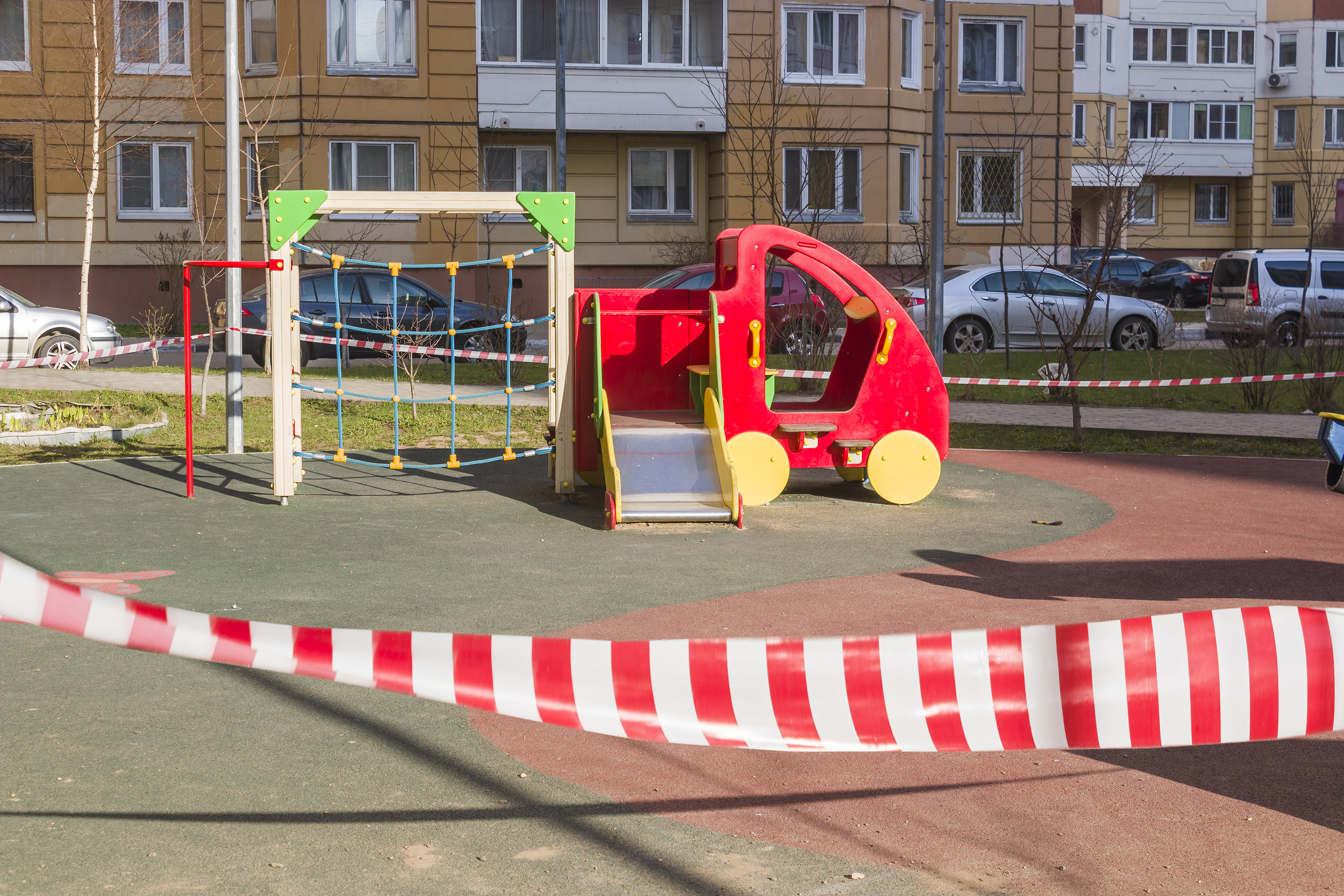
Playground closed for quarantine, 7 April 2020

On 28 March, Chechen authorities urged the population of the republic to stay at their places of permanent residence, and banned entry to Grozny for anyone except emergency services, food supplies, government officials, police, and journalists. On the next day, Chechnya closed its borders, with a full lockdown coming into effect on 30 March.

On 29 March, Moscow issued a stay-at-home order for all residents starting on 30 March. Muscovites were not allowed to leave their homes except in cases of emergency medical care and other threats to life and health, to travel to work for those who are obliged to, to make purchases in the nearest shop or pharmacy, to walk pets at a distance not exceeding 100 metres from the place of residence, as well as to take out the garbage. People were instructed to keep a distance of 1.5 metres from other people. Those recently unemployed will receive 19,500 rubles a month. After that, a similar regime was introduced in Moscow Oblast at 20:00 MSK on 29 March. Senator Andrey Klishas, chair of the Federation Council Committee on constitutional legislation and state construction, criticised this decision, saying that such restrictions are the exclusive competence of the Federal Assembly and the President.

On 30 March, similar orders were announced in Adygea, the Komi Republic, Mari El, Tatarstan, Chuvashia, some districts of Yakutia, Arkhangelsk, Astrakhan, Belgorod, Irkutsk, Kaliningrad, Kursk, Lipetsk, Murmansk, Nizhny Novgorod, Novgorod, Ryazan, Saratov, Sverdlovsk, Ulyanovsk and Vologda oblasts, the cities of Bryansk and Saint Petersburg. Leningrad Oblast banned movement of people between districts and introduced a lockdown in the town of Murino.

On 31 March, the "self-isolation regime" was announced in republics of Altai, Bashkortostan, Buryatia, Dagestan, Ingushetia, Kabardino-Balkaria, Kalmykia, Karachay-Cherkessia, Karelia, Khakassia, Mordovia, Udmurtia and Tuva, Altai, Khabarovsk (for those over 65), Krasnodar, Krasnoyarsk, Perm, Primorsky, Stavropol and Zabaykalsky krais, Bryansk, Chelyabinsk, Kaluga, Kemerovo, Kirov, Kostroma, Kurgan, Magadan, Novosibirsk, Omsk, Penza, Pskov (for those over 65), Rostov, Sakhalin, Samara, Smolensk, Tambov, Tomsk, Vladimir, Volgograd, Voronezh and Yaroslavl oblasts, Khanty-Mansi and Yamalo-Nenets autonomous okrugs, the Jewish Autonomous Oblast, the city of Sevastopol. Republics of Yakutia and Karelia limited the sale of alcohol.

On 1 April, the "self-isolation regime" was announced in the disputed territory of Crimea and Sevastopol, the republic of North Ossetia–Alania, Kamchatka and Khabarovsk krais, Ivanovo and Orenburg oblasts. On 2 April, the measures were announced in Amur Oblast (for those over 65), Tyumen Oblast, and Chukotka Autonomous Okrug. On 3 April, the measures were announced in Oryol Oblast and Tula Oblast (for those over 65).

==== Medical supervision ====
Russia has regularly reported the number of people under medical supervision because they were suspected of having the virus.

- On 25 April 168,000 people
- On 26 April 170,000 people
- On 27 April 183,000 people

On 5 May Russia reported that a total of 806,709 people had been under medical supervision to date during the outbreak and the current number was 222,500.

On 8 May 292,000 people were under medical surveillance.

On 9 May 242,000 people were under medical surveillance.

=== Medical and protective equipment ===
On 4 March, Russia temporarily banned the export of medical masks, gloves, bandages, and protective suits.

On 28 April president Vladimir Putin summarised progress on producing additional equipment as follows:

- Ventilator production increased from 60 to 70 per month to over 800 in April and 2,500 in May
- Face masks from 800,000 per day to 8.5m in April
- Protective suits for doctors from 3,000 per day to 100,000 per day by end of April and 150,000 per day by mid-May

Additional production was required and the Ministry of Industry and Trade was given the task to further increase daily production.

On 15 June 2020, Human Rights Watch documented that healthcare workers in Russia were facing threats and reprisal from employers and law enforcement. The medical workers were being targeted for speaking about lack of adequate personal protective equipment (PPE) to safely treat suspected patients and prevent the spread of COVID-19.

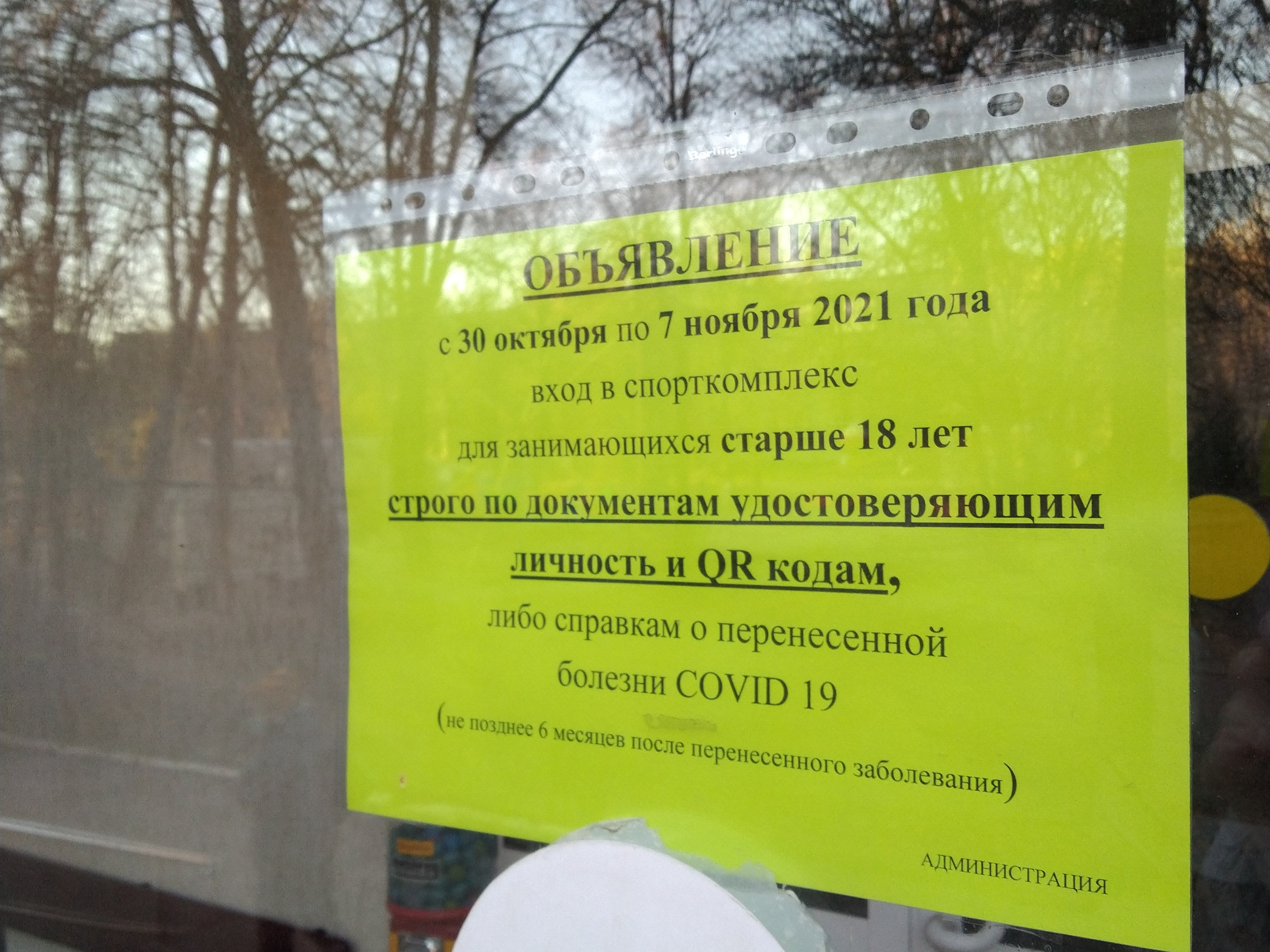
An ad asking visitors to provide QR-codes and identification papers. Only 18 years old were allowed. Ryazan, Russia.

=== QR-code mandate ===
On November 15, 2021, due to a surge of number of COVID-19 cases Russian government submitted several bills to Gosduma to force businesses to verify QR-code passes obtained by citizens in order to prove vaccination before granting them access to mass public events, restaurants, retailers, and cultural institutions, as well as trains and planes. Several cities and regions have reportedly enacted similar decrees earlier in November.

== Local measures ==
=== Moscow and Moscow Oblast ===
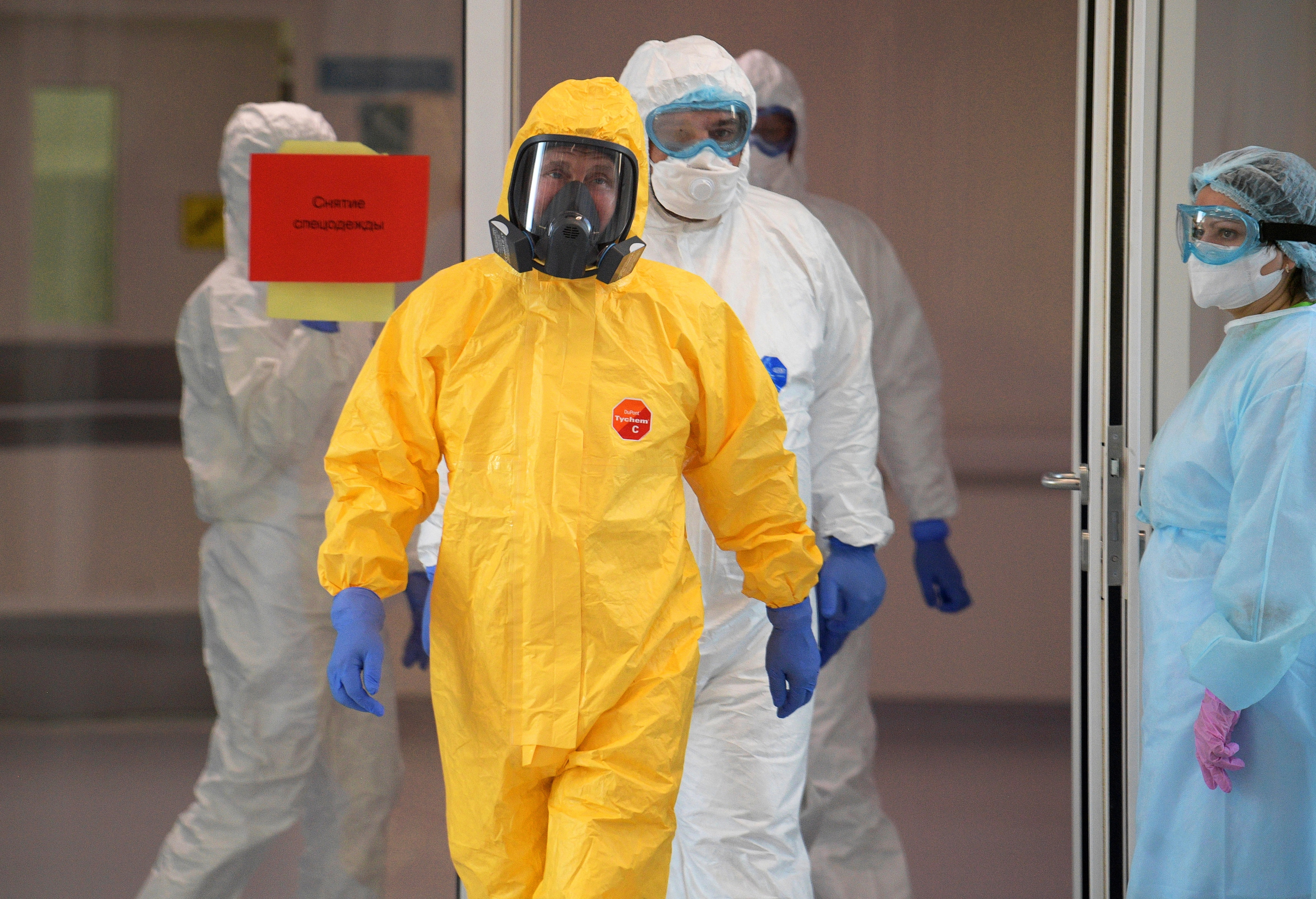
President Putin visits coronavirus patients at City Clinical Hospital No. 40 in Kommunarka on 24 March.

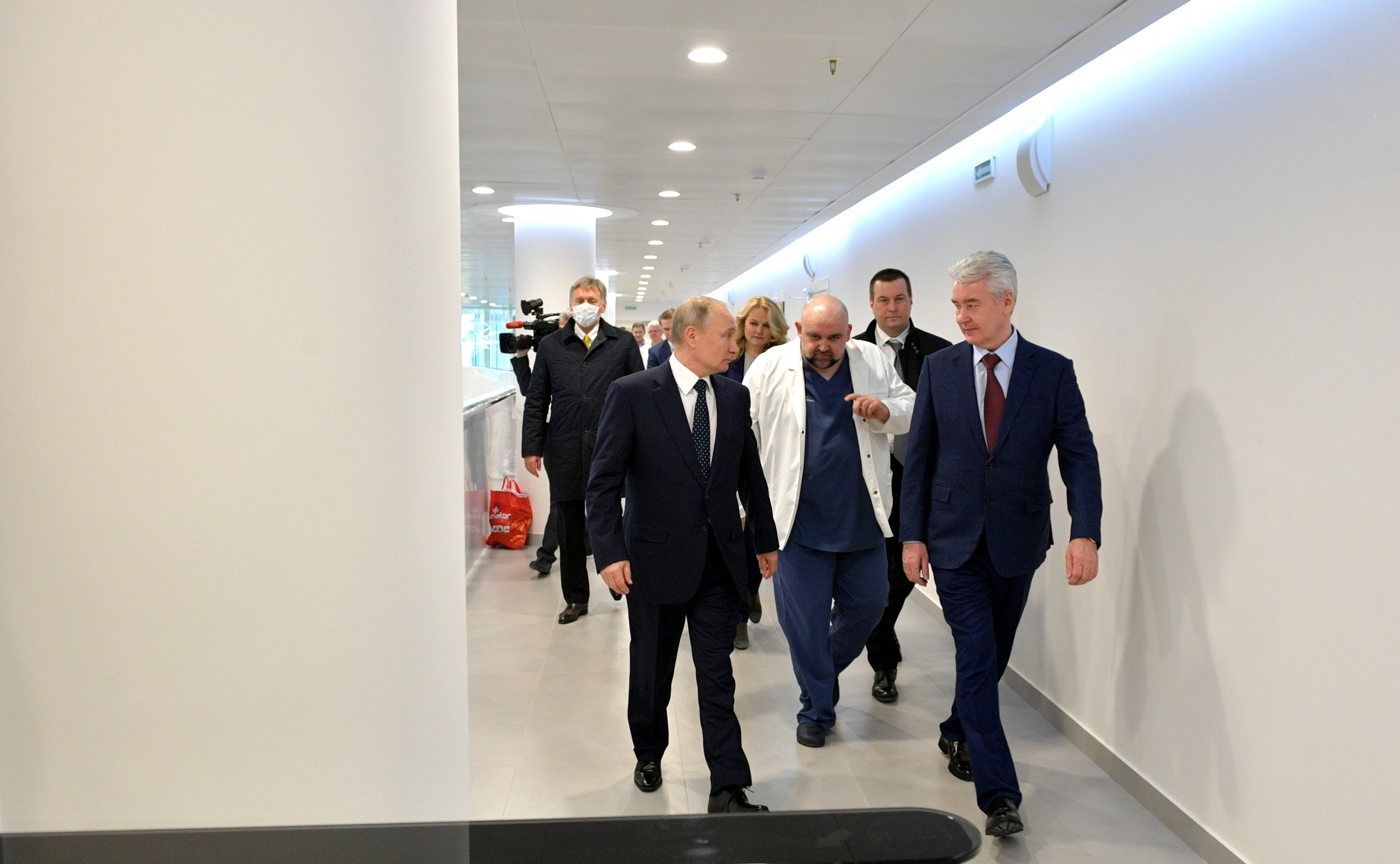
Denis Protsenko (middle), the medical director of the Kommunarka hospital visited by President Putin (left) and Moscow Mayor, Sobyanin (right), tested positive for the coronavirus on 31 March 2020.

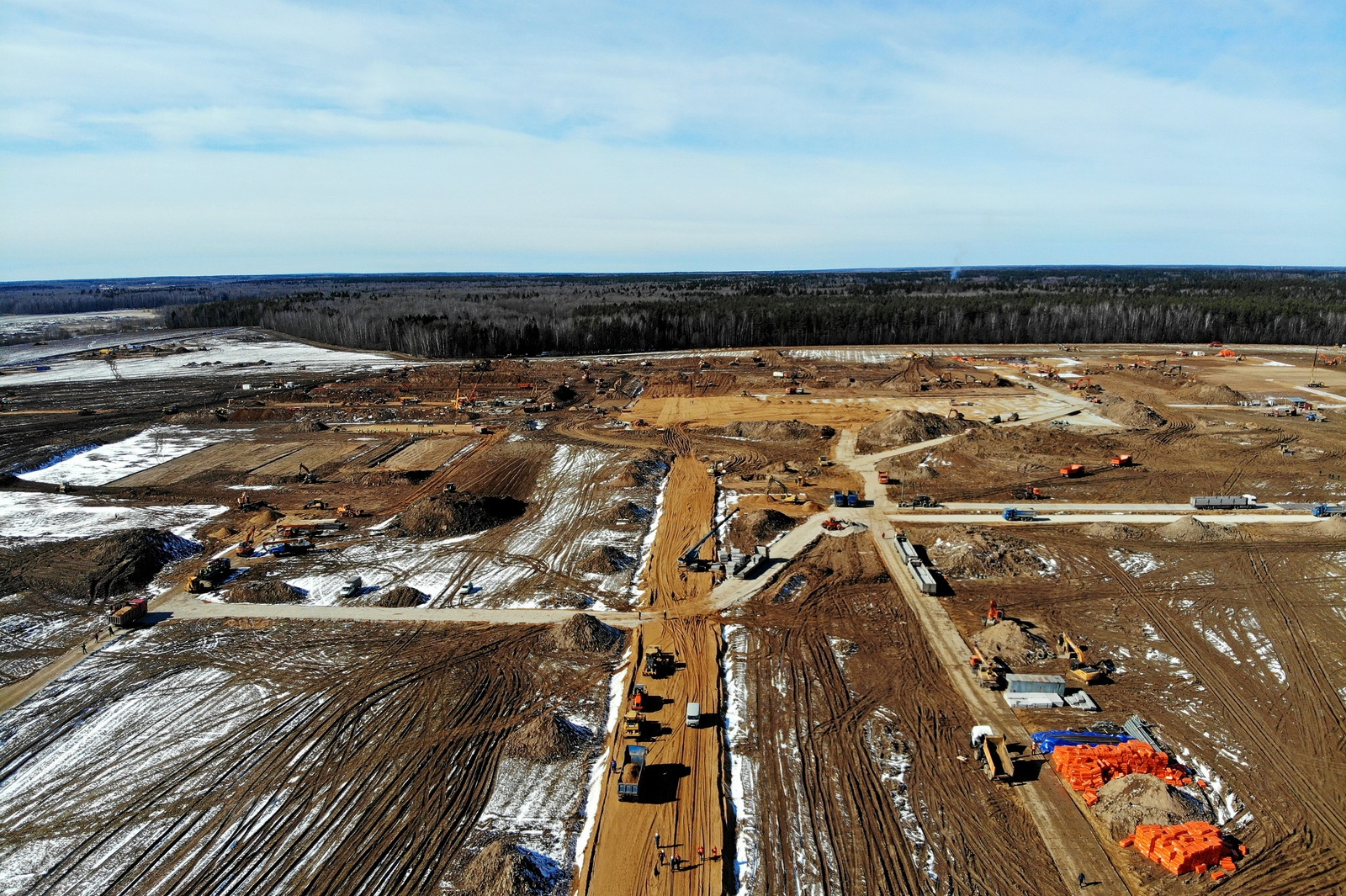
Construction of the Infectious Diseases Hospital in Voronovskoye in New Moscow in connection with the spread of coronavirus started on 12 March. The photo shows progress as of 16 March 2020.

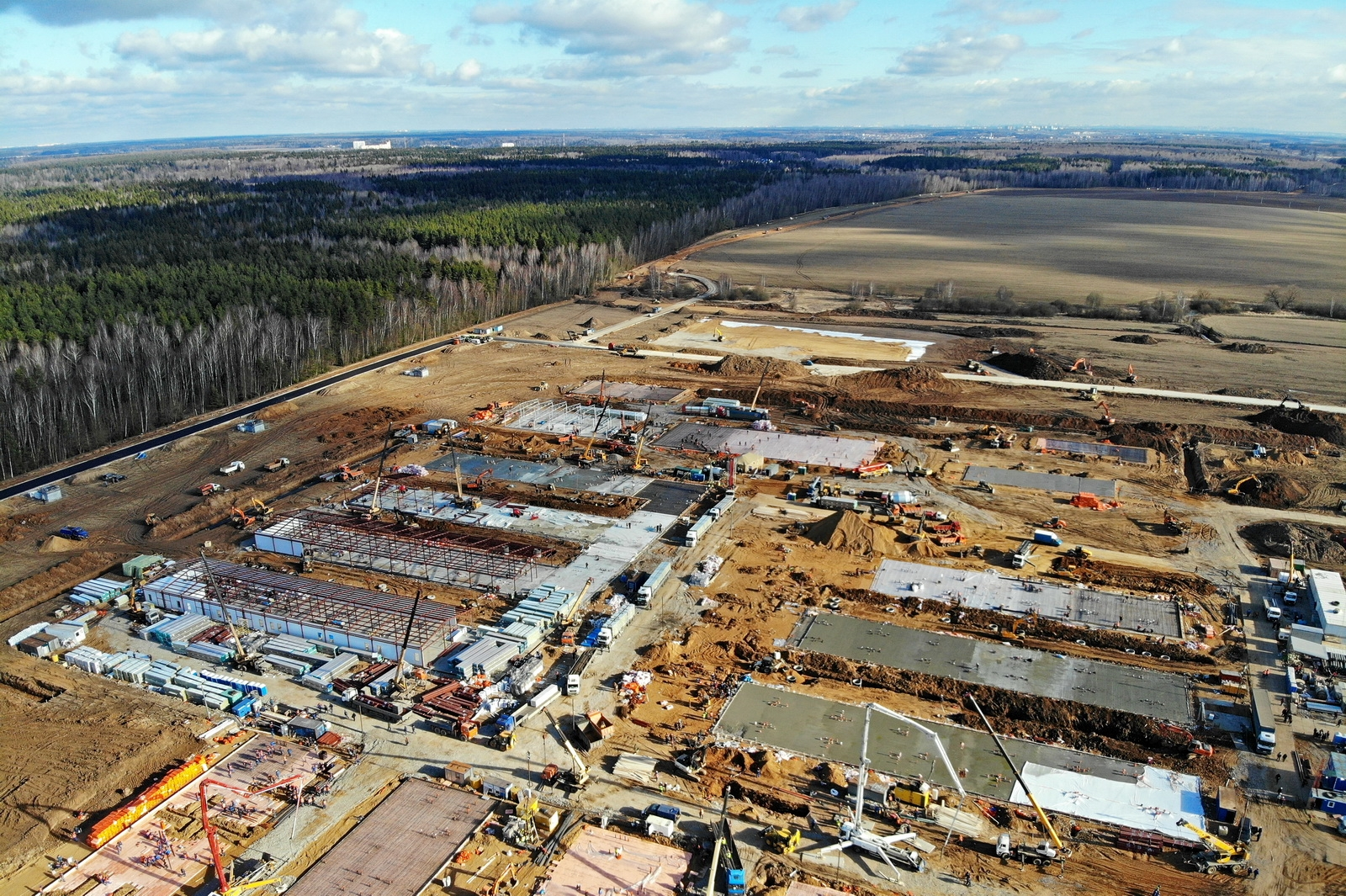
21 March 2020

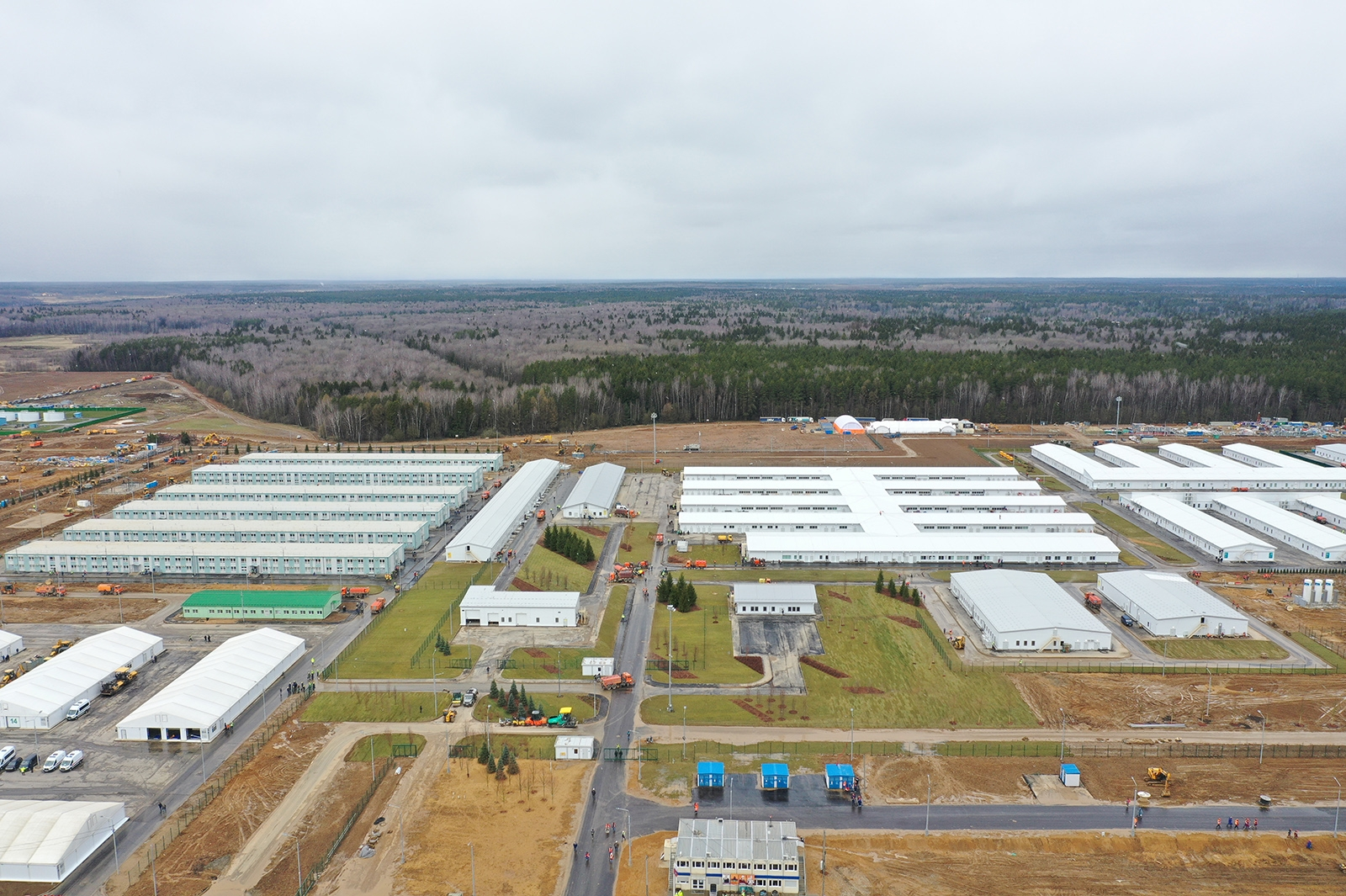
Infectious Diseases Hospital in Voronovskoye was opened on 17 April.

Moscow started the construction of a special hospital for the coronavirus patients near the villages of Babenki and Golokhvastovo in Troitsky Administrative Okrug.

From the beginning of the outbreak, Moscow patients have been brought to already-in-place newly constructed yet underused City Hospital No. 40 in the district of Kommunarka, which is located outside MKAD and only recently got a metro station. Subsequently, almost 30 hospitals in Moscow started to receive suspected COVID-19 patients, with being the City Hospital No. 15, Infectious Hospital No. 2, Bashlyaeva Children's Hospital, Infectious Hospital No. 2, and the hospital in Kommunarka being the most capacious of them. In mid-April, it was announced that additional 24 hospitals would be repurposed to receive coronavirus patients, bringing the total number of beds available in the city to 21 thousand.

On 6 March, Mayor of Moscow Sergey Sobyanin announced a "high alert regime", ordering self-isolation for two weeks for Russians returning from China, South Korea, Iran, France, Germany, Italy and Spain.

On 10 March, Mayor Sobyanin signed a decree for banning mass events in Moscow with more than 5,000 participants from 10 March to 10 April.

On 12 March, the Governor of Moscow Oblast Andrey Vorobyov has announced a high alert status, banning large events with over 5,000 people.

Since 16 March, school attendance was optional in Moscow and Moscow Oblast. According to RBK, Moscow recommended that private schools go on a two-week holiday or switch to distance learning. On 21 March, schools were closed for three weeks.

On 16 March, Moscow extended measures to closing public schools, athletic schools and supplemental education institutions from 21 March to 12 April; banning indoor events with more than 50 attendees and all outdoor mass events. The compulsory 14-day self-isolation which had been previously enforced to people coming China, South Korea and Iran, was extended to those coming from the United States and all European countries.

On 23 March, Mayor Sobyanin ordered all people over 65 to self-isolate at home starting Thursday, saying each would receive 4,000 rubles (around $50) for following the order. He also suggested that older residents leave Moscow and stay in their dachas. School students' public transportation cards were temporarily suspended, starting from the 5th grade.

On 24 March, it was announced that Moscow hospitals would receive up to 200,000 rubles (around $2,500) for each coronavirus patient from the city's health insurance fund.

On 25 March, following the respective decision of the federal government, Mayor Sobyanin ordered the closure of all municipal libraries and clubs, as well as cinemas and nightclubs, banned hookah smoking in cafes, and suspended any organised leisure social activities, including amusement parks. He also instructed dental clinics to see patients with acute pain or other emergencies only. Municipal multiservice centres suspended services, except for those unavailable online. Free or concessionary use of public transport was suspended for people aged over 65, with chronic diseases, students of vocational schools or high schools.

On 26 March, Mayor Sobyanin ordered restaurants, cafes, bars, canteens, parks, commercial, and retail businesses requiring personal attendance, except those providing essential services, like grocery shops and pharmacies, to close during the week from 28 March to 5 April, the holiday week announced by President Putin.

On 28 March, Sobyanin urged Muscovites to stay at home, except for seeking medical help, work travel, local shopping, walking pets not further than 100 m from home, taking out trash. He announced that a "smart control system" would be introduced to control these rules.

On 3 April, Sobyanin announced that the city bike-sharing system Velobike would resume operation after the winter break on 10 April, but will be available for delivery agents and volunteers only, free of charge.

On 4 April, he ordered all the businesses in the city that were working to secure a social distance of at least 1.5 m between the workers and the customers.

On 10 April, Sobyanin introduced a system of electronic permits due to the increase in violations of the stay-at-home regime, ordered most types of companies and institutions in the city to halt operation, paused the work of the world's largest carsharing system. Starting from 15 April, people using private cars, taxis or public transport, will have to get a digital pass indicating the purpose of travel. The number of permits available will be limited, except for unlimited passes for work trips.

==== Accusations of ethnic profiling at the earlier stages ====
In February, drivers of Mosgortrans were required to inform their dispatchers if they see Chinese nationals in their vehicles, to call the police. Moscow Metro employees were required to ask Chinese nationals to fill in questionnaires.

On 21 February, Mayor Sobyanin confirmed that Mosgortrans and Moscow Metro were asked to work together with police forces to "monitor those who arrived from China". Facial recognition was also used to track these people.

On 24 February, the Chinese Embassy in Russia asked Moscow authorities to put an end to these "excessive measures" in transport. Sobyanin insisted that the measures were not discriminatory but helped control those who were required to stay self-isolated upon arrival from China.

In early March, numerous cases of deportation of Chinese students who allegedly broke the quarantine rules were reported.

However at the later stages many of these Russian measures were applied to all foreign arrivals, including for Russian citizens coming back from abroad, with them being forced into self quarantine and facecam profiling. 200 cases of quarantine-breakers by Russian citizens were reported to be recognised with facecam profiling, tracked by public surveillance cameras in Moscow.

=== Saint Petersburg and Leningrad Oblast ===
On 13 March, the governors of Saint Petersburg and Leningrad Oblast Alexander Beglov and Aleksandr Drozdenko announced a high alert status and banned events with more than 1,000 and 300 people respectively.

On 18 March, Governor of Saint Petersburg Alexander Beglov banned events and gatherings with more than 50 people. On 26 March, he ordered restaurants, cafes, bars, canteens, parks, places of worship, commercial and retail businesses requiring personal attendance, except those providing essential services, like grocery shops and pharmacies, to close during the holiday week from 28 March to 5 April. Free and concessionary tickets for public transport will be suspended during the week. Leisure facilities including nightclubs, children's playrooms, and recreation centres will be closed until 30 April. In Leningrad Oblast only pharmacies, grocery shops, building material and household shops will remain open during the holiday week.

On 1 April, the Saint Petersburg Metro will start closing at 22:00 MSK instead of 0:00–0:45 MSK. Ground transportation will end at 23:00 MSK and its intervals will be increased.

=== Other regions ===
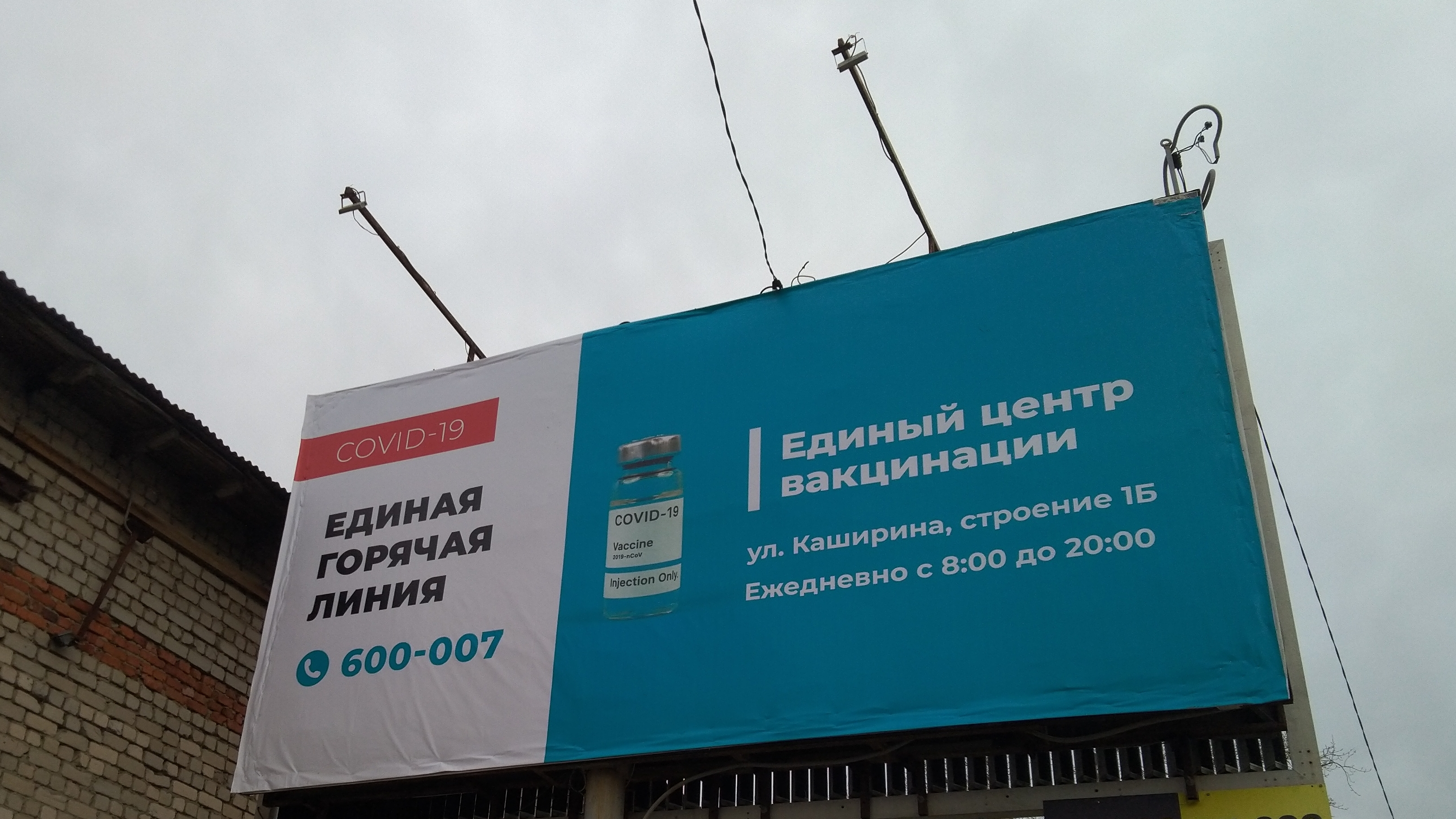
A billboard advertising hotline number for vaccination help

Chechnya was the first region to close restaurants and cafes on 24 March and to announce closure of its borders on 5 April.

On 15 April, it was reported that Murmansk Oblast will use electronic bracelets to monitor those suspected to have the coronavirus and self-isolating at home.

On 27 April, the governor of Nizhny Novgorod Oblast, Gleb Nikitin, said that entry to the region would be banned unless one has an emergency permit or proof of residence there.

On 18 May, Saratov Oblast reinstated its ban on walks and outdoor activities a week after easing restrictions due to an increase in cases.

== Foreign aid ==
In early February, aid was sent to China.

On 22 March, after a phone call with Italian Prime Minister Giuseppe Conte, Russian president Vladimir Putin arranged the Russian army to send medical help to Italy, which was the European country hardest hit by coronavirus.

On 1 April, a Russian military plane was sent to the United States to deliver medical equipment. The equipment was apparently sold to the US.
