= Svitino =

Svitino (Russian: Свитино) is the name of several rural localities in Russia:

- Svitino, Kaluga Oblast, a village in Medynsky District of Kaluga Oblast
- Svitino, Klenovskoye Settlement, Moscow, a village in Klenovskoye Settlement in Troitsky Administrative Okrug of the federal city of Moscow
- Svitino, Voronovskoye Settlement, Moscow, a selo in Voronovskoye Settlement in Troitsky Administrative Okrug of the federal city of Moscow
- Svitino, Moscow Oblast, a village under the administrative jurisdiction of Selyatino Work Settlement in Naro-Fominsky District of Moscow Oblast; 55°30′N 37°2′E
- Svitino, Tver Oblast, a village in Barykovskoye Rural Settlement of Kashinsky District in Tver Oblast
