= Babenki =

Babenki, Babyonki (Russian: Бабенки, Бабёнки) is the name of several rural localities in Russia:

- Babyonki, Vladimir Oblast, a village in the Kovrovsky District, Vladimir Oblast
- Babyonki, Ivanovo Oblast, a village in the Ivanovsky District, Ivanovo Oblast
- Babenki, Dzerzhinsky District, Kaluga Oblast, a village in the Dzerzhinsky District, Kaluga Oblast
- Babenki, Kaluga, Kaluga Oblast, a village in the city of Kaluga, Kaluga Oblast
- Babenki, Yukhnovsky District, Kaluga Oblast, a village in the Yukhnovsky District, Kaluga Oblast
- Babenki, Moscow, a village in the Troitsky Administrative Okrug, Moscow
- Babenki, Smolensk Oblast, a village in the Vyazemsky District, Smolensk Oblast
- Babyonki, Kimrsky District, Tver Oblast, a village in the Kimrsky District, Tver Oblast
- Babenki, Rzhevsky District, Tver Oblast, a village in the Rzhevsky District, Tver Oblast
- Babenki, Selizharovsky District, Tver Oblast, a village in the Selizharovsky District, Tver Oblast
- Babyonki, Staritsky District, Tver Oblast, a village in the Staritsky District, Tver Oblast
