= Infectious Diseases Hospital in Voronovskoye =

- Demikhov City Clinical Hospital
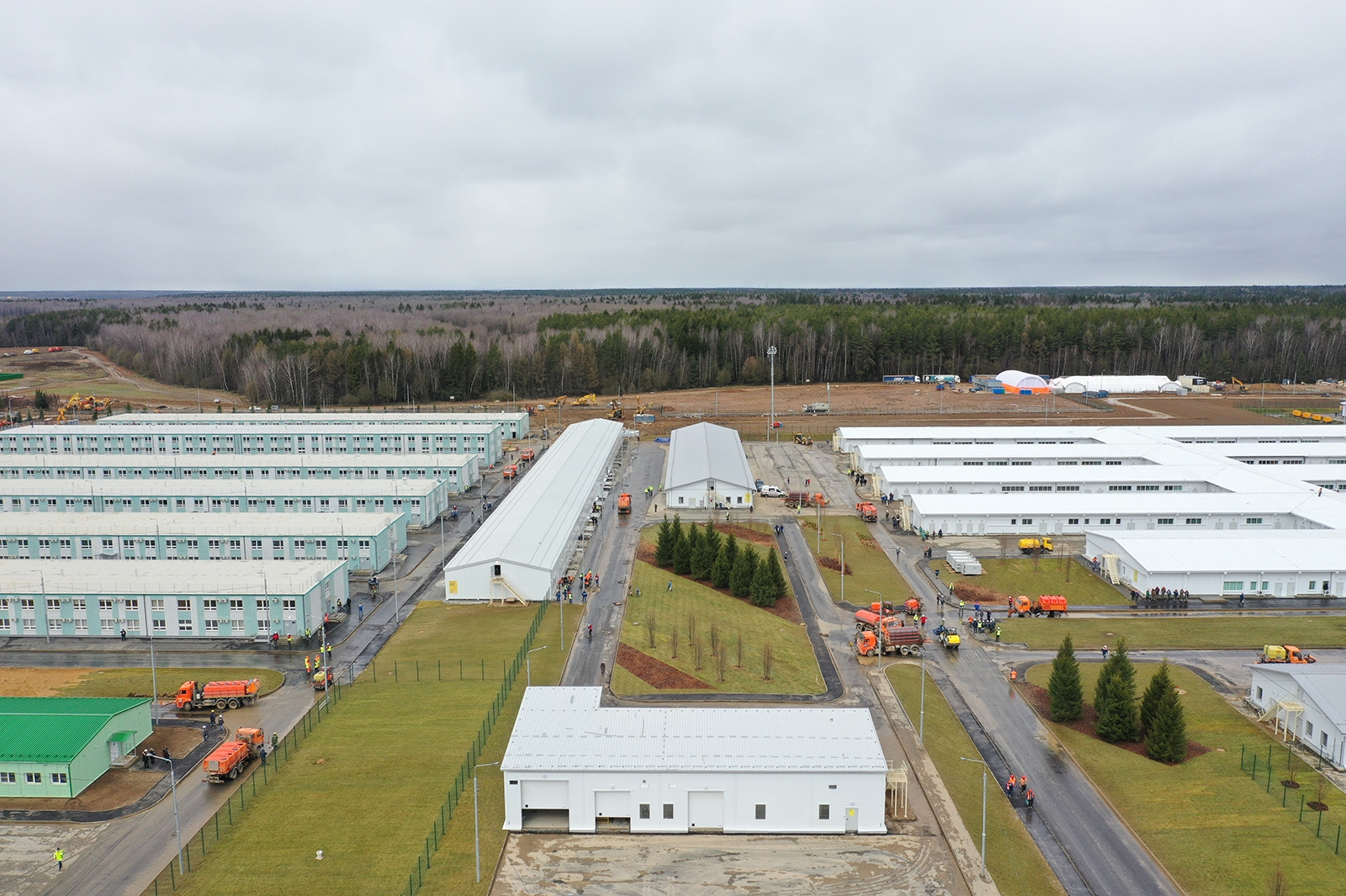
- The hospital in April 2020

Geography
- Location: Golokhvastovo, Voronovskoye, Moscow, Russia
- Coordinates: 55°22′03″N 37°11′25″E

Services
- Emergency department: Yes
- Beds: 800

Helipads
- Helipad: Yes

History
- Founded: 2020

Links
- Website: demikhova.ru/mkcib-voronovskoe (in Russian)
- Lists: Hospitals in Russia

The Voronovskoye Moscow Clinical Center for Infectious Diseases (Russian: Московский клинический центр инфекционных болезней «Вороновское») (project name Infectious Diseases Hospital in the Voronovsky Settlement of Moscow) is an autonomous infectious diseases hospital near the village of Golokhvastovo, the Voronovskoye Settlement of Moscow. The clinic is part of the State Budgetary Healthcare Institution Demikhov City Clinical Hospital. The hospital complex is designed for 800 beds (with the possibility of expanding to 900 beds and transforming each bed into an intensive care unit within 24 hours), of which half are intensive care.

== History ==
In accordance with the decree of Moscow Mayor, Sergey Sobyanin dated March 5, 2020 No. 12-UM “On the introduction of a high-alert regime,” an instruction was given to study the issue of building a new modern hospital for the treatment of patients with COVID-19.

On March 11, Sobyanin arrived with builders at a construction site in New Moscow. There was an open field here. Construction began on March 12. The general contractor for the construction of the infectious disease center is the city holding Mosinzhproekt. Representatives of large Moscow companies work on the site - DSK-1, PIK, Krost, MISK, Mospromstroy, Ingeocom, HelixPRO, and employees of network organizations. Also working at the site are the construction elite - metro construction workers, specialists from the companies MIP-Story No. 1, Mosmetrostroy and IBT. On March 24, construction volumes were 40% completed. It was planned that this infectious disease center would be completed and opened within a month from the start of construction. On April 11, 2020, the hospital complex was 98% ready. On April 17, 2020, the complex was opened by Moscow Mayor Sergey Sobyanin. On April 20, 2020, the hospital admitted its first 20 patients.
