= Babenki, Moscow =

Babyonki, Babenki Бабёнки, Бабенки
- Village
- Location within Moscow Location within Russia
- Coordinates: 55°22′19″N 37°11′18″E
- Country: Russia
- Region: Moscow
- District: Troitsky Administrative Okrug
- Time zone: UTC+03:00

Babyonki, Babenki (Russian: Бабёнки, Бабенки) is a village in Voronovskoye Settlement, Troitsky Administrative Okrug of the federal city of Moscow, Russia. Population: 105 (2010 census); 60 (2002 census);
