= Golokhvastovo, Voronovskoye Settlement, Troitsky Administrative Okrug, Moscow =

Golokhvastovo Голохвастово
- Village
- Location within Moscow Location within Russia
- Coordinates: 55°22′15″N 37°12′13″E
- Country: Russia
- Region: Moscow
- District: Troitsky Administrative Okrug
- Time zone: UTC+03:00

Golokhvastovo (Russian: Голохвастово) is a village in Voronovskoye Settlement, Troitsky Administrative Okrug of the federal city of Moscow, Russia. Population: 43 (2010 census); 20 (2002 census);

The name comes from the names of 17th-century village owners, Alexei Golokhvastov and Bogdan Golokhvastov. However, their surname most likely came from the non-calendar personal name Golokhvast.

In March 2020, the construction of an infectious diseases hospital for those suffering from COVID-19 began near the village.

In April 2020, the hospital complex was put into operation, and received the official name of the Voronovskoye Moscow Clinical Center for Infectious Diseases. It was subordinate to the GKB named after I.I. V.P. Demikhova.
