= City Clinical Hospital No. 40 (Moscow) =

City Hospital No 40 of City of Moscow
- Department of Healthcare of the City of Moscow
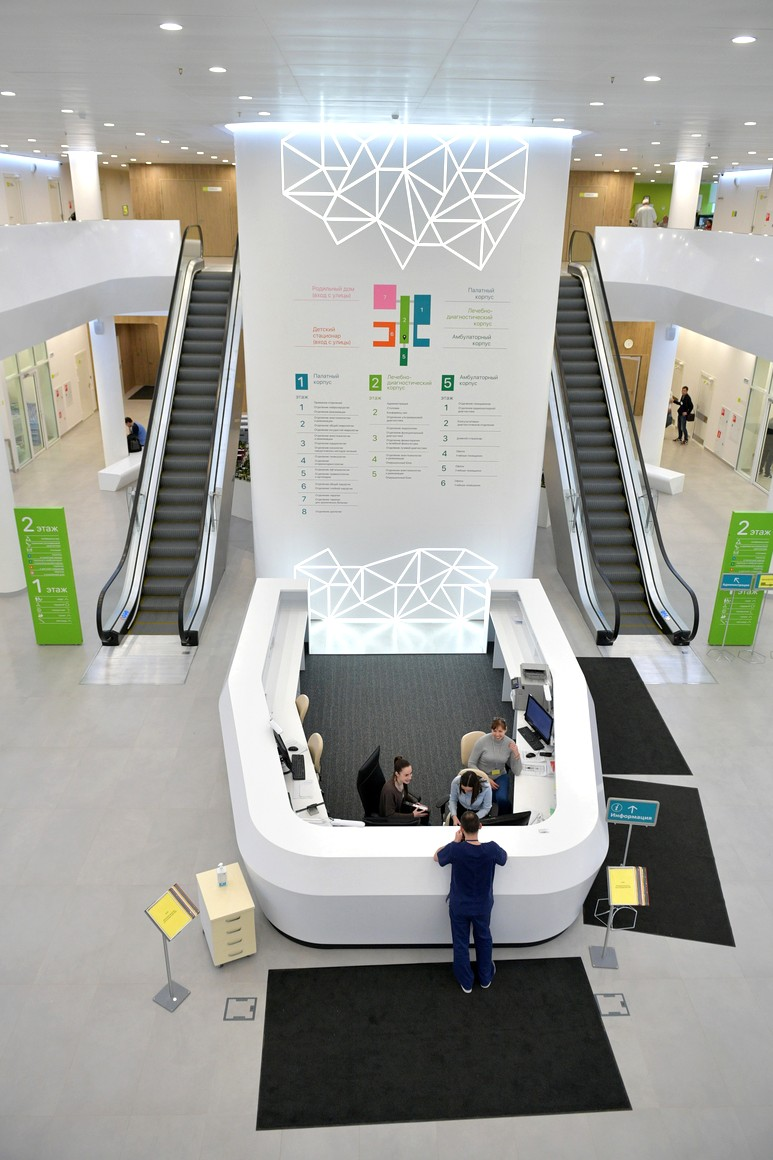
- The Kommunarka complex, March 2020

Geography
- Location: Moscow, Russia

Organisation
- Type: District

Services
- Beds: 1000+

Helipads
- Helipad: Yes

History
- Founded: 1898

Links
- Website: www.gkb40dzm.ru
- Lists: Hospitals in Russia

City Clinical Hospital No. 40 (Russian: Государственное бюджетное учреждение здравоохранения города Москвы «Городская клиническая больница № 40 Департамента здравоохранения города Москвы» (ГБУЗ «ГКБ № 40 ДЗМ»)) is a major hospital serving Moscow and the region surrounding it.

== History ==
The history of the hospital dates back to 1898, when at a meeting of the Moscow District Zemstvo, Dr. Evgeny Fedorovich Pecherkin was instructed to organize the Rostokino Zemstvo Hospital (Russian: Ростокинская Земская больница). The territory designated for the hospital was a wasteland.

The hospital complex began with 4 peasant huts, which housed an outpatient clinic with a pharmacy, an emergency room for 3-4 beds and rooms for paramedical and obstetrical personnel and families. Medical assistance was provided to the population of the surrounding villages, factory workers.

By 1899, a wooden house was built, which began to function as a hospital with surgical, therapeutic and maternity beds. Separately, a barrack was built for "contagious" patients and apartments for staff. The hospital had a total of 40 beds. The hospital and outpatient clinic served twenty-five thousand people in the villages of Alekseevsky, Rostokino, Medvedkovo, Leonovo, Sviblovo, Ostankino and Mokhovo near Moscow.

In 2019 the hospital expanded significantly with the addition of a new complex in Kommunarka district in southern Moscow called Novomoskovskoye (Russian: медицинский центр «Новомосковский». Since the breakout of the COVID-19 pandemic in Russia, the Kommunarka complex became one of the largest treatment centers for infected people, with president Putin visiting the hospital.

== See also ==
- Healthcare in Russia
