= Svitino, Moscow Oblast =

Village in Naro-Fominsky District, Moscow Oblast, Russia

Coordinates: 55.505°N 37.028°E

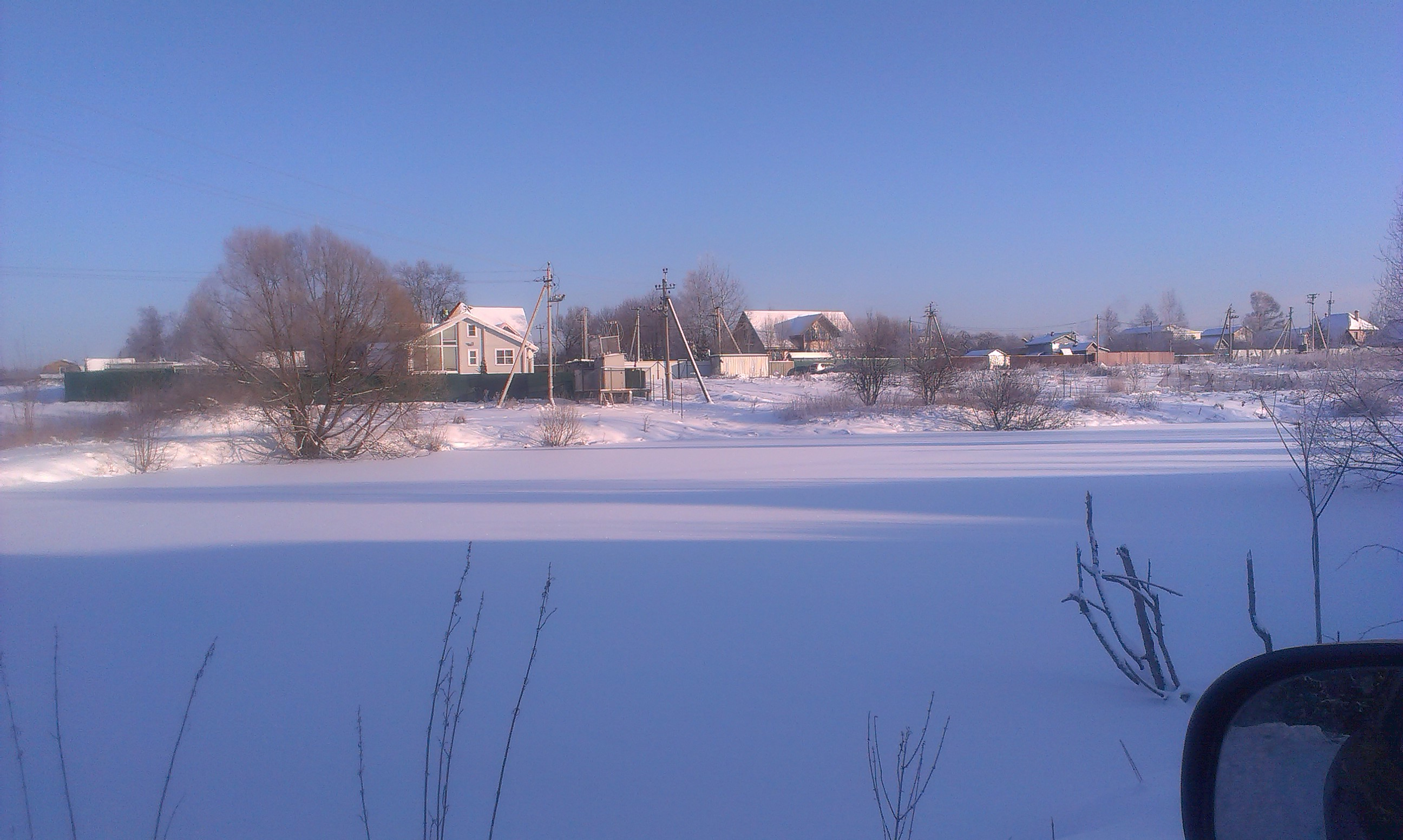
Svitino Village Picture

Svitino is a Russian village near Sofino/Sofyino in the Naro-Fominsky District.

== Point of interest ==
Svitino is characterized by a small lake having a fauna with crucian carps and Chinese sleeper (known in Russian as Rotan and scientifically as Perccottus glenii) and it is surrounded by the local forest.
