= LMS, Moscow =

LMS ЛМС
- Settlement
- Location within Moscow Location within Russia
- Coordinates: 55°18′40″N 37°11′18″E
- Country: Russia
- Region: Moscow
- District: Troitsky Administrative Okrug
- Time zone: UTC+03:00

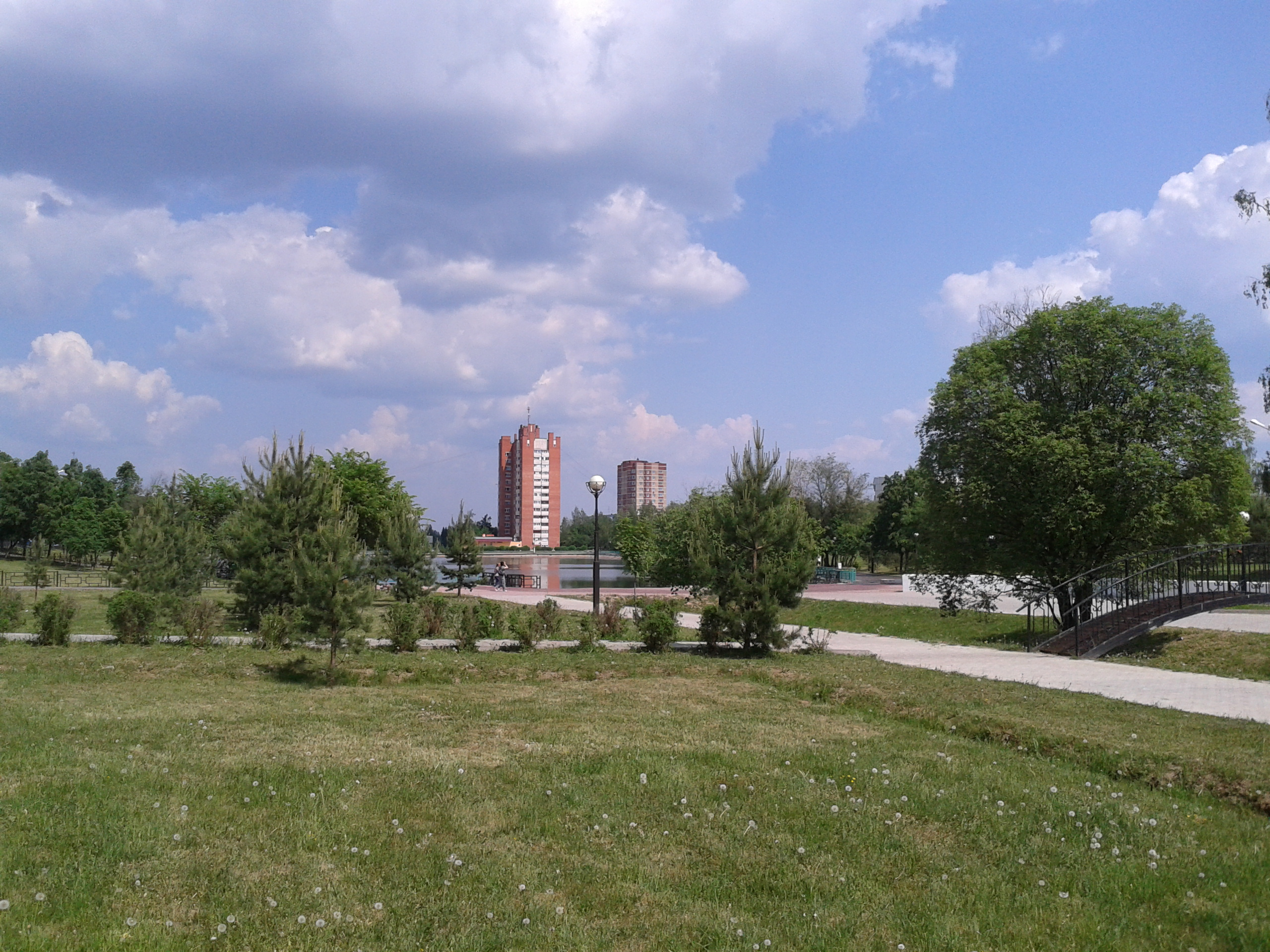
LMS, Moscow

LMS (Russian: ЛМС) is a settlement in Troitsky Administrative Okrug of the federal city of Moscow, Russia. Population: 5,238 (2010 census); 5,414 (2002 census);
