= Troitsky Administrative Okrug =

Coordinates: 55°29′29″N 37°18′33″E

Troitsky Administrative Okrug Троицкий административный округ
- Administrative okrug of Moscow
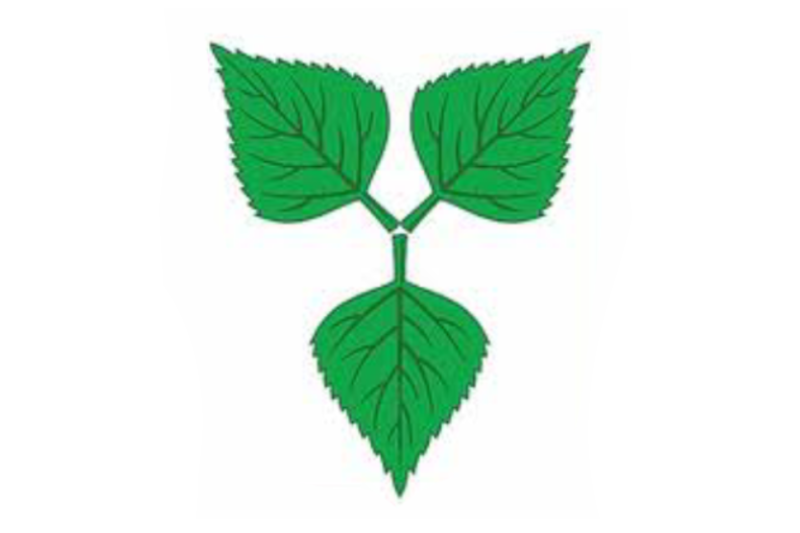
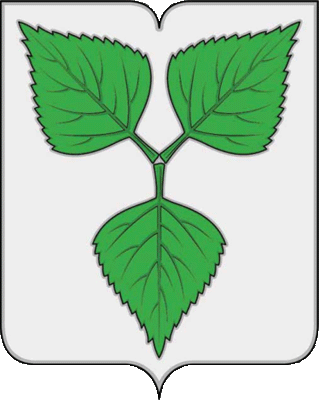
- Flag Coat of arms
- Troitsky Administrative Okrug in Moscow
- Country: Russia
- Federal city: Moscow
- Settlements: 10

Population (2024)
  - Total: 196,407

Troitsky Administrative Okrug (Russian: Троицкий административный округ) is one of the twelve administrative okrugs of Moscow. The okrug was founded on July 1, 2012.

== Territorial organisation ==
At the time of formation it included the following settlements, which previously belonged to Naro-Fominsky and Podolsky Districts, as well as Troitsk Town of Oblast Significance, all of Moscow Oblast,

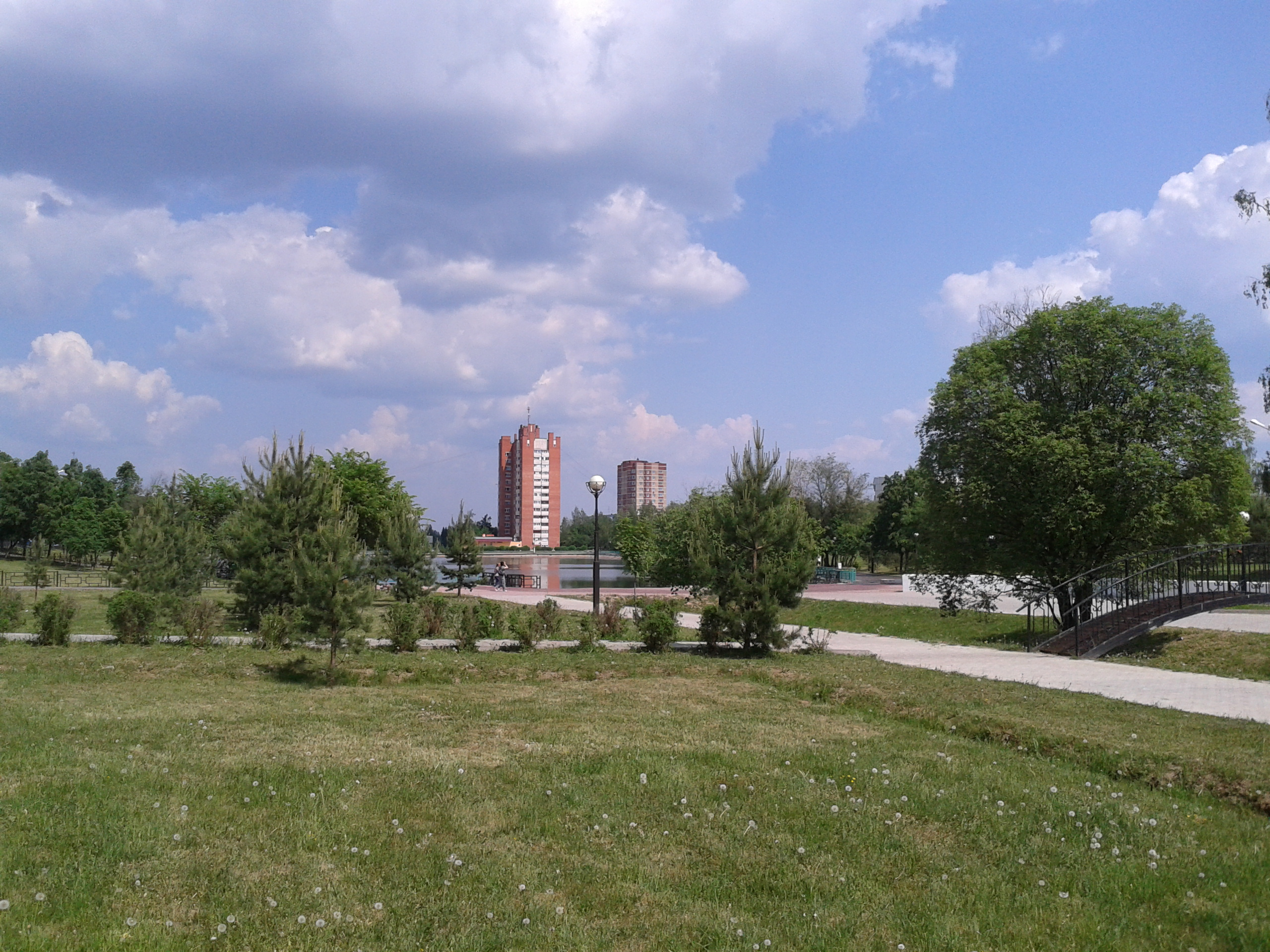
LMS, Voronovskoye Settlement

- Troitsk Settlement;
- Kiyevsky Settlement;
- Klenovskoye Settlement;
- Krasnopakhorskoye Settlement;
- Mikhaylovo-Yartsevskoye Settlement;
- Novofyodorovskoye Settlement;
- Pervomayskoye Settlement;
- Rogovskoye Settlement;
- Shchapovskoye Settlement;
- Voronovskoye Settlement.
