= Voronovskoye Settlement =

Voronovskoye Вороновское
- Settlement
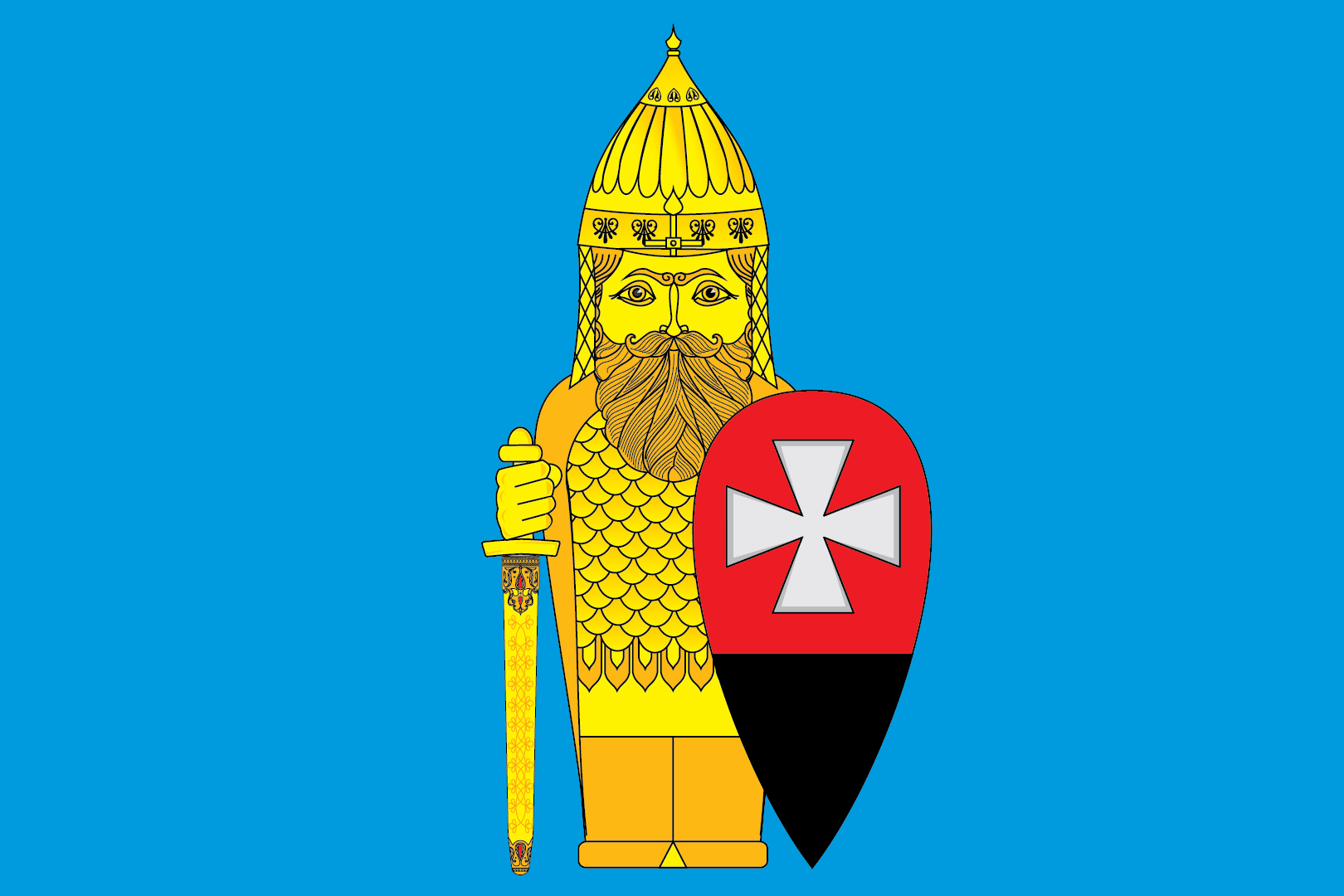
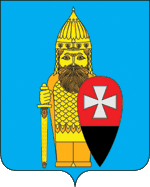
- Flag Coat of arms
- Voronovskoye Settlement within the federal city of Moscow
- Location of Voronovskoye
- Location of Voronovskoye Voronovskoye (Moscow)
- Coordinates: 55°19′23″N 37°09′24″E
- Country: Russia
- Federal subject: Moscow

Administrative status
  - Subordinated to: Troitsky Administrative Okrug
- Time zone: UTC+3 (MSK)
- OKTMO ID: 45943000
- Website: voronovskoe.ru

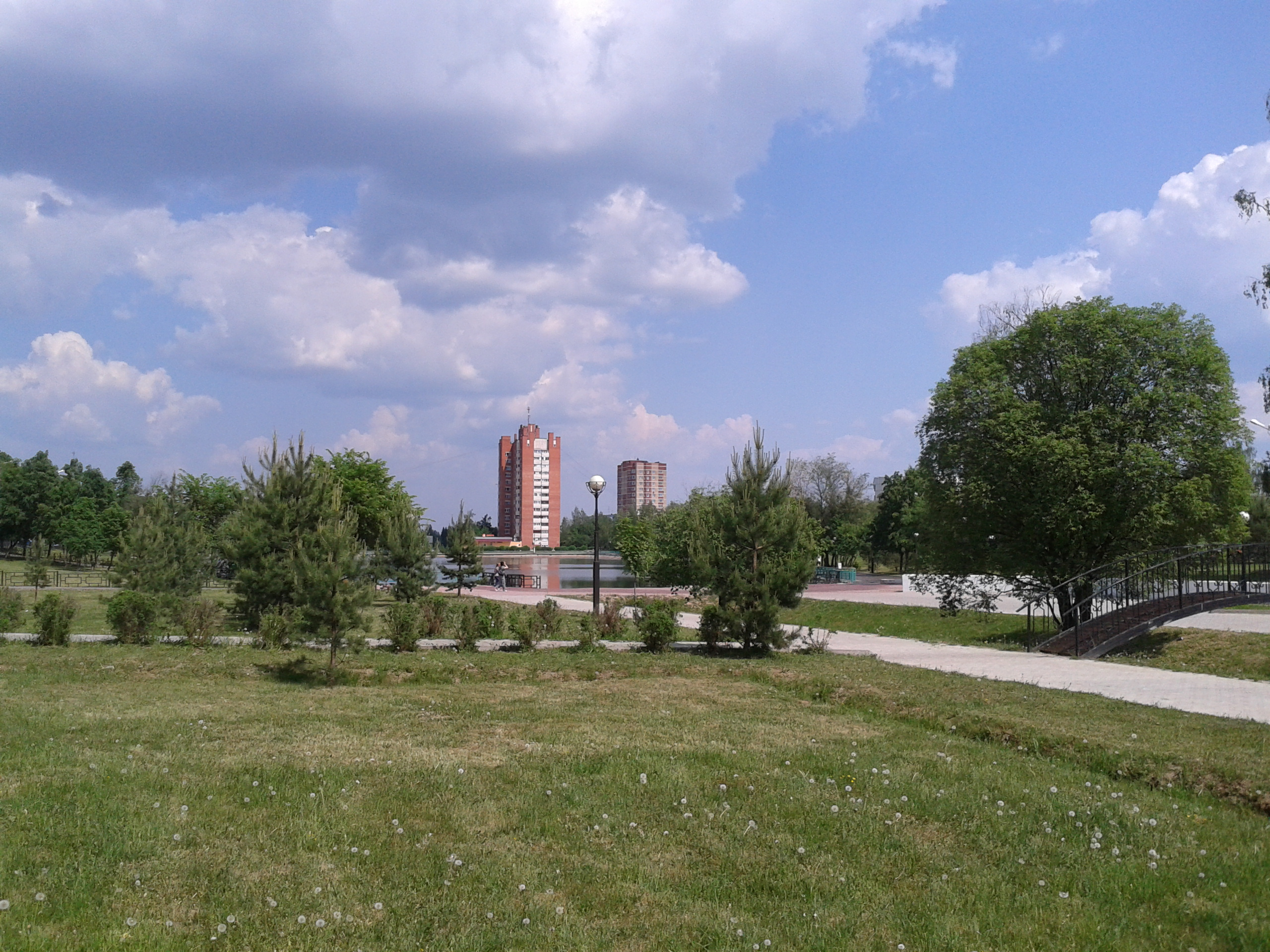

Voronovskoye Settlement (Russian: Поселение Вороновское) is a settlement (both municipal and administrative unit in Moscow) in Troitsky Administrative Okrug of Moscow. It was established in 2005 as Voronovskoye urban settlement in Podolsky municipal raion of Moscow Oblast and now it consists of the settlement of LMS and 22 other inhabited localities of the abolished Voronovskoye rural district. On 1 July 2012, Voronovskoye Settlement was transferred to the city of Moscow and became a part of Troitsky Administrative Okrug.
