= Line D5 (Moscow Central Diameters) =

Future suburban railway line in Moscow

Yaroslavsko-Paveletsky Diameter

Overview
- Native name: Ярославско-Павелецкий диаметр
- Status: Planned
- Owner: Government of Russia
- Locale: Moscow
- Termini: Pushkino; Domodedovo
- Stations: 39 (may be changed)

Service
- Type: Commuter rail
- System: Moscow Central Diameters
- Services: Pushkino-Domodedovo, Mytishchi-Shchyolkovo
- Operator(s): Central Suburban Passenger Company

History
- Planned opening: 2028

Technical
- Line length: 89 km (55 mi)
- Track gauge: 1,520 mm (4 ft 11 27/32 in) Russian gauge

D5 (Russian: МЦД-5) or Yaroslavsko-Paveletsky Diameter (Russian: Ярославско-Павелецкий диаметр) is the fifth line of the Moscow Central Diameters which will open in 2028 or later. The line may have 39 stations with the main route between Pushkino and Domodedovo stations and a branch route between Mytishchi and Shchyolkovo stations.

Although at first many routes were proposed for D5, the route chosen was that D5 would run underground through Rizhskaya, Ploshchad Tryokh Vokzalov, Kitay-gorod, Paveletskaya and Derbenevskaya stations.

In 2024 Moscow Mayor Sergey Sobyanin announced that due to financial problems the central section won't be constructed in the next 10 years. There is chance there will be two separated section: Line 5 (from Ploschad Tryokh Vokzalov to Pushkino) and Line 5A (from Paveletskaya to Domodedovo).

== Stations ==
Station Name		Transfers/Branches
English	Russian	Transfers/Branches
Pushkino	Пушкино	
Mamontovskaya	Мамонт	
Klyazma	Клязьма	
Tarasovskaya	Тарасовская	
Chelyuskinskaya	Челюскинская	
Stroitel	Строитель	
Mytishchi (branch to Shchyolkovo)	Мытищи (ответвление на Щёлково)	Shchyolkovo branch: 8 stations (1 station in common)
Tayninskaya	Тайнинская	
Perlovskaya	Перловская	
Los	Лось	
Losinoostrovskaya	Лосиноостровская	
Rostokino	Ростокино	Rostokino
Yauza	Яуза	
Malenkovskaya	Маленковская	
Rizhskaya	Рижская	Rizhsky Railway Terminal; Rizhskaya; Rizhskaya; Rizhskaya; Rizhskaya
Ploshchad Tryokh Vokzalov	Площадь трёх вокзалов	Ploshchad Tryokh Vokzalov; Leningradsky Railway Terminal; Kazansky Railway Terminal; Komsomolskaya; Komsomolskaya
Kitay-gorod	Китай-город	Kitay-gorod
Paveletskaya	Павелецкая	Paveletskaya; Paveletskaya; Aeroexpress trains to Domodedovo Airport
Derbenevskaya	Дербеневская	
Tulskaya	Тульская	Tulskaya
Verkhnie Kotly	Верхние Котлы	Nagatinskaya; Verkhnie Kotly; Aeroexpress trains to Domodedovo Airport
Nagatinskaya	Нагатинская	Nagatinskaya
Varshavskaya	Варшавская	Varshavskaya
Chertanovo	Чертаново	
Kotlyakovo	Котляково	Kotlyakovo
Biryulyovo-Tovarnaya	Бирюлёво-Товарная	
Biryulyovo-Passazhirskaya	Бирюлёво-Пассажирская	Biryulyovo
Bulatnikovo	Булатниково	
Vidnoe	Видное	
Kalinina	Калинина	
Leninskaya	Ленинская	
32 km	32 км	
Domodedovo	Домодедово	Aeroexpress trains to Domodedovo Airport
