= Podlipki-Dachnye =

Railway station in Moscow Oblast, Russia

Podlipki-Dachnye Подлипки-Дачные
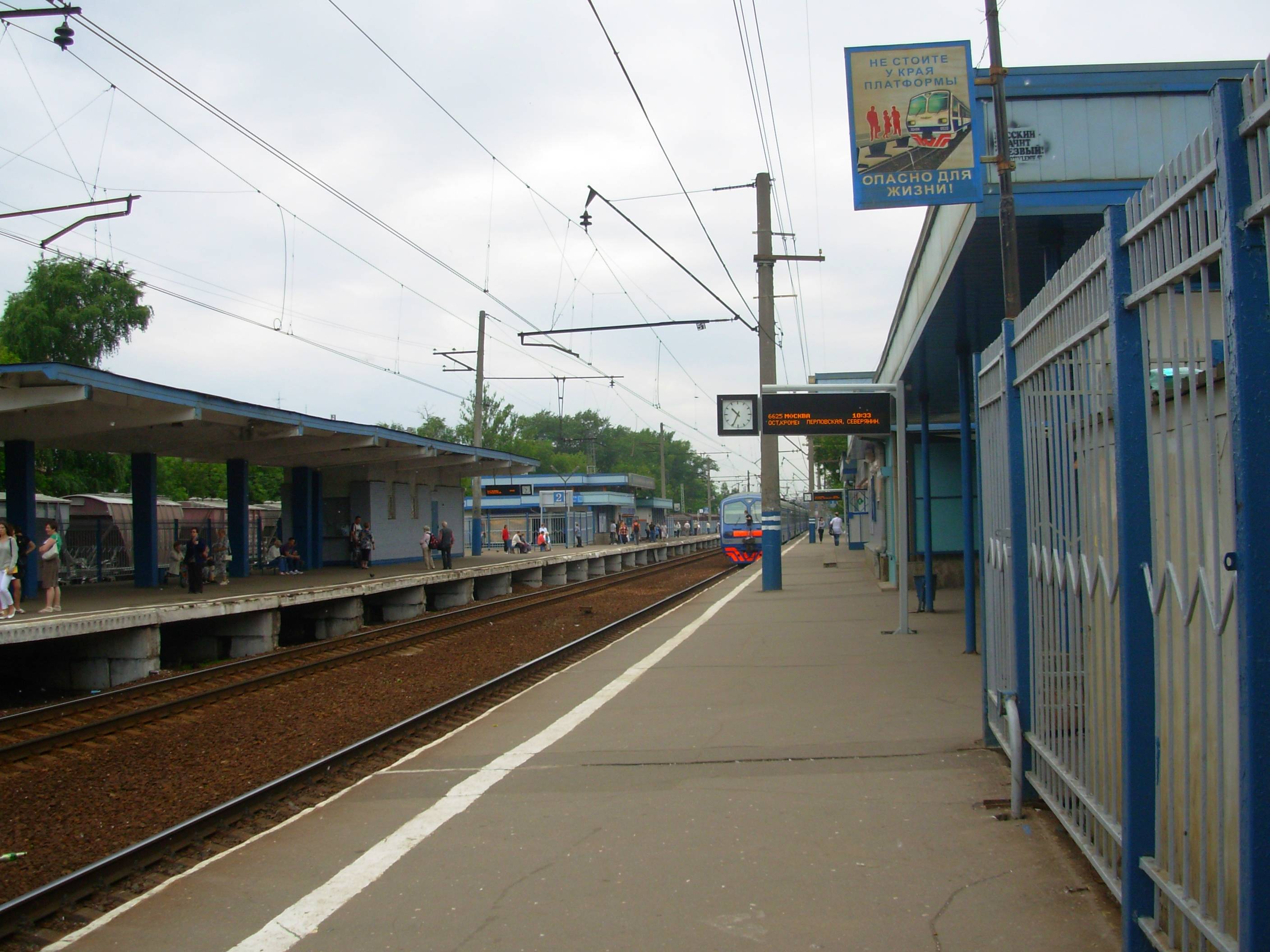

General information
- Location: Korolyov, Moscow Oblast; Russia
- Coordinates: 55.925472°N 37.816861°E
- Owner: Russian Railways
- Operator: Moscow Railway
- Line: Yaroslavsky Suburban Line
- Platforms: 2
- Tracks: 2
- Connections: Bus: 1, 2, 28, 392

Construction
- Structure type: At-grade
- Platform levels: 1

Other information
- Station code: 234901
- Fare zone: 3

History
- Opened: 1914
- Rebuilt: 2000s

Services
Preceding station	Russian Railways	Following station
Mytishchi Terminus	Yaroslavsky Suburban Fryazevo Branch	Bolshevo towards Fryazevo
Location

Podlipki-Dachnye is a railway station of Yaroslavsky suburban railway line. It is located in the city of Korolyov of Moscow Oblast.

It takes 1 hour 20 minutes to get to the station from the Moscow Yaroslavsky railway station and 35 minutes from Fryazino station.

== History ==
The station was opened in 1914. It was named after the then-existing housing estate Villa-Podlipki. It was reconstructed and equipped with turnstiles in the beginning of the 2000s.

== Public conveyances ==
There are 3 bus routes that have the station as a terminus:

- 12 — to station Bolshevo
- 16 — to Lesnaya school
- 15 — to the town of Yubileyny

Also buses of routes 1 and 2 (to Silikatnaya str.), 28 (to Mytishchi station) and 392 (to VDNKh Moscow Metro station) make a stop there.
