= Losinoostrovskaya railway station =

Railway station in Moscow, Russia

Losinoostrovskaya Лосиноостровская
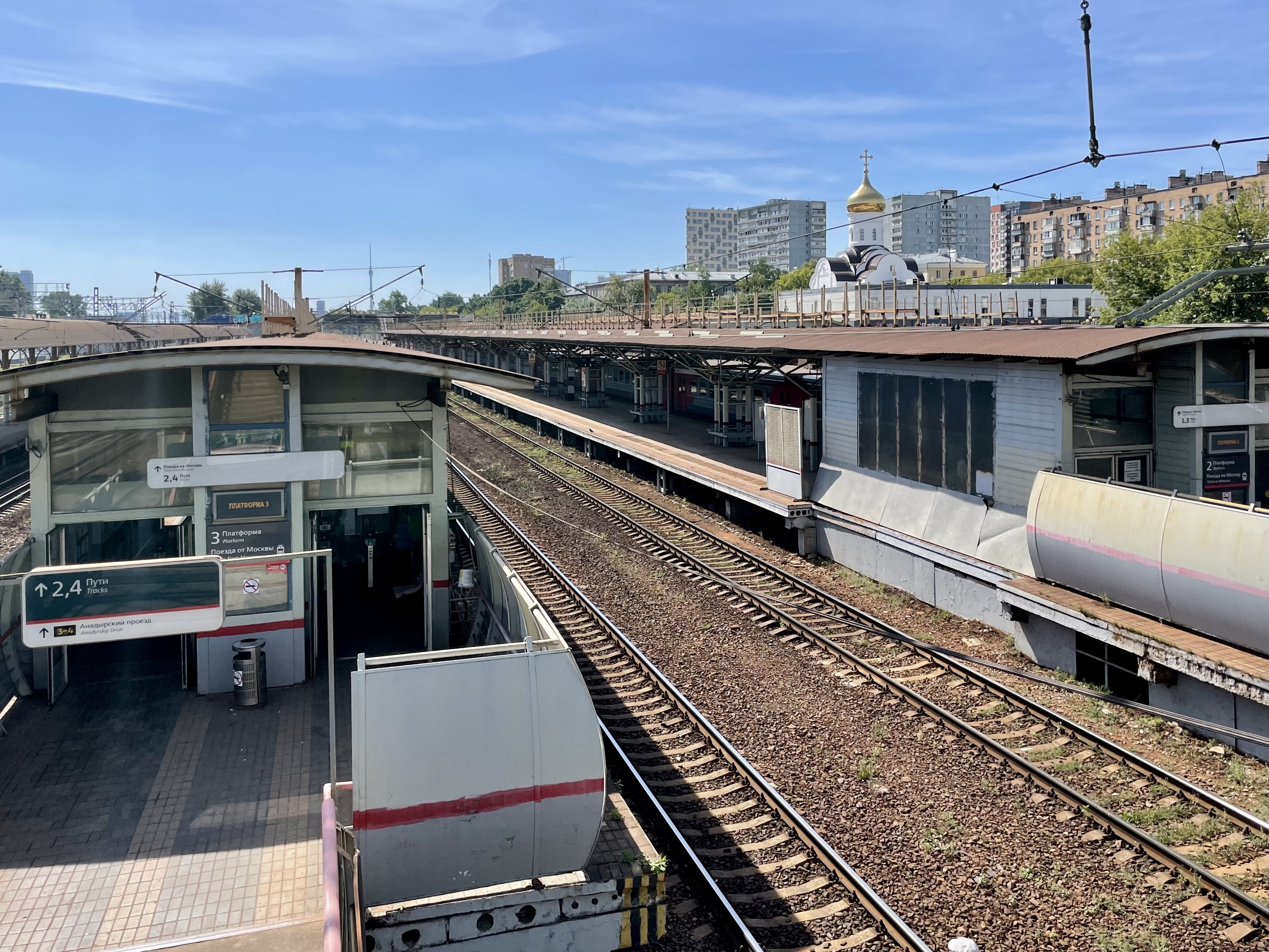

General information
- Location: Losinoostrovsky District, Moscow; Russia
- Coordinates: 55.828889°N 37.671111°E
- System: Moscow Railway station
- Owner: Russian Railways
- Operator: Moscow Railway
- Line: Yaroslavsky Suburban Line
- Platforms: 2
- Tracks: 4

Construction
- Structure type: At-grade

Other information
- Station code: 2001125
- Fare zone: 2

History
- Opened: 1898
- Electrified: 1929

Services
Preceding station	Russian Railways	Following station
Rostokino towards Moscow Yaroslavsky	Yaroslavsky Suburban	Los towards Balakirevo
Route map
Location
- Location within Moscow Ring Road

Losinoostrovskaya (Russian: Лосиноостровская) is a railway station located in Losinoostrovsky District of Moscow, Russia. The station serves suburban traffic of Yaroslavsky suburban railway line by Moscow Railway. The southbound trains terminate at Moscow Yaroslavsky railway station in Moscow. The northbound trains terminate at the stations of Bolshevo, Fryazino Passazhirskaya, Monino, Shchyolkovo, Fryazevo, Pushkino, Sofrino, Krasnoarmeysk, Sergiyev Posad, Alexandrov I, and Balakirevo. All suburban trains stop at Losinoostrovskaya. The station is operated by the Moscow Railway.

The adjacent station in the northern direction is Los, and the one in the southern direction is Rostokino.

Losinoostrovskaya has access to Menzhinskogo Street, Rudnevoy Street, and Anadysrky Proyezd (west), as well as to Dudinka Street and Khibinsky Proyezd (east). The public bus traffic is organized. The station is surrounded by a residential area.

== History ==
The first summer houses were constructed in the area in 1898. In the same year, a railway station, Platform of the 10th versta (Russian: Платформа 10-й версты) was open to serve the houses. In 1904, a settlement of Losinoostrovsky was officially established. The name came from the nearby Losiny Ostrov Forest, currently Losiny Ostrov National Park. In 1908, the Moscow Encircle Railway was completed, and the Platform of the 10th versta, renamed to Losinoostrovskaya, became a large freight station. In addition to the freight yard, there was a locomotive depot. In November 1924, the settlement of Losinoostrovsky was renamed Losinoostrovsk and was granted a town status. In 1939 it was renamed Babushkin, after Mikhail Babushkin, and in 1960, Babushkin was merged into Moscow. In 1929, the railway line between Moscow and Mytishchi, including Losinoostrovskaya, was electrified.

In 1900, a railway line connecting Beskudnikovo and Losinoostrovskaya was constructed. This was done in order to facilitate the railway traffic between Moscow and Kimry (Savyolovo), since Moscow Savyolovsky railway station was not open yet. After a tram line from central line to Medvedkovo was built, in 1966 a direct connection to Losinoostrovskaya was discontinued, and the whole railway line was demolished in 1987.
