= Yauza =

Yauza may refer to:

- Yauza (river), a river in Moscow, Russia
- Yauza River, a tributary of the Lama River of Moscow and Tver oblasts of Russia
- Yauza River, a tributary of the Gzhat River of Smolensk Oblast, Russia
- Yauza railway station, in Moscow, Russia
- 81-720/721, or Yauza, a Russian subway car model
- 5887 Yauza, a minor planet
- Yauza (publisher) (1993–), a Russian publishing company
