= Bolshevo =

Town in Moscow Oblast, Russia

Bolshevo Болшево
- Town
- Interactive map of Bolshevo
- Location of Bolshevo Bolshevo (Moscow Oblast)
- Coordinates: 55°56′N 37°51′E
- Country: Russia
- Federal subject: Moscow Oblast
- Founded: 1573
- Town status since
- Elevation: 159 m (522 ft)

Population (2010 Census)
  - Total: 1,000
  - Estimate (2002): 10,217 (+921.7%)

Administrative status
  - Subordinated to: Korolev Town Under Oblast Jurisdiction

Bolshevo (Russian: Бо́лшево) is the area of the city of Korolyov (an industrial city in Moscow Oblast, Russia, well known as the cradle of Soviet and Russian space exploration), the historical part of it. It was founded as an independent town in 1573. It is best known as giving the name of Bolshevo railway station which is located on Yaroslavsky suburban railway line, Moscow.

In 2019 the exhibition Station Bolshevo: the crossroads of fate, 1939 commemorated a notebook of the poet Marina Tsvetaeva which contains translations she made of 12 poems by Mikhail Lermontov into French whilst in Bolshevo. A second notebook belonging to Sergei Durylin was also featured. This contained chapters from his book In His Own Corner which covered his stay in Bolshevo, also in 1939.

== Gallery ==
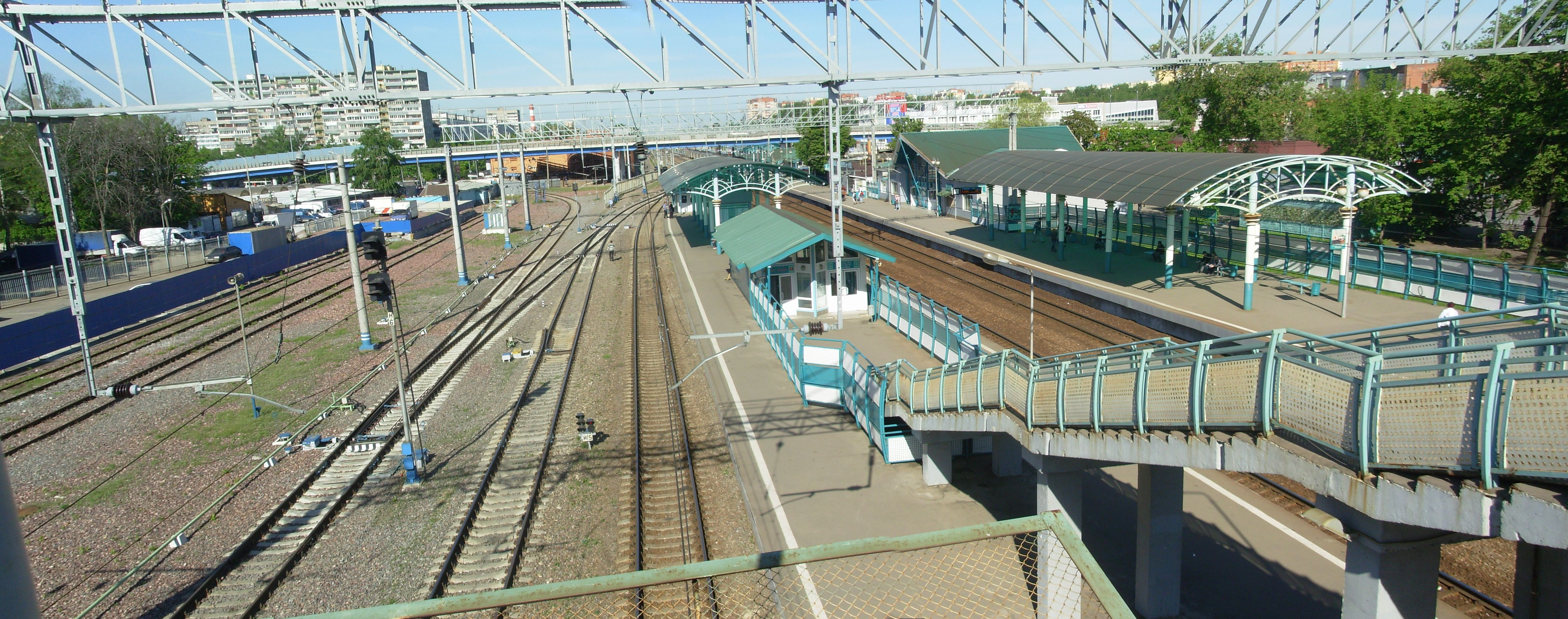

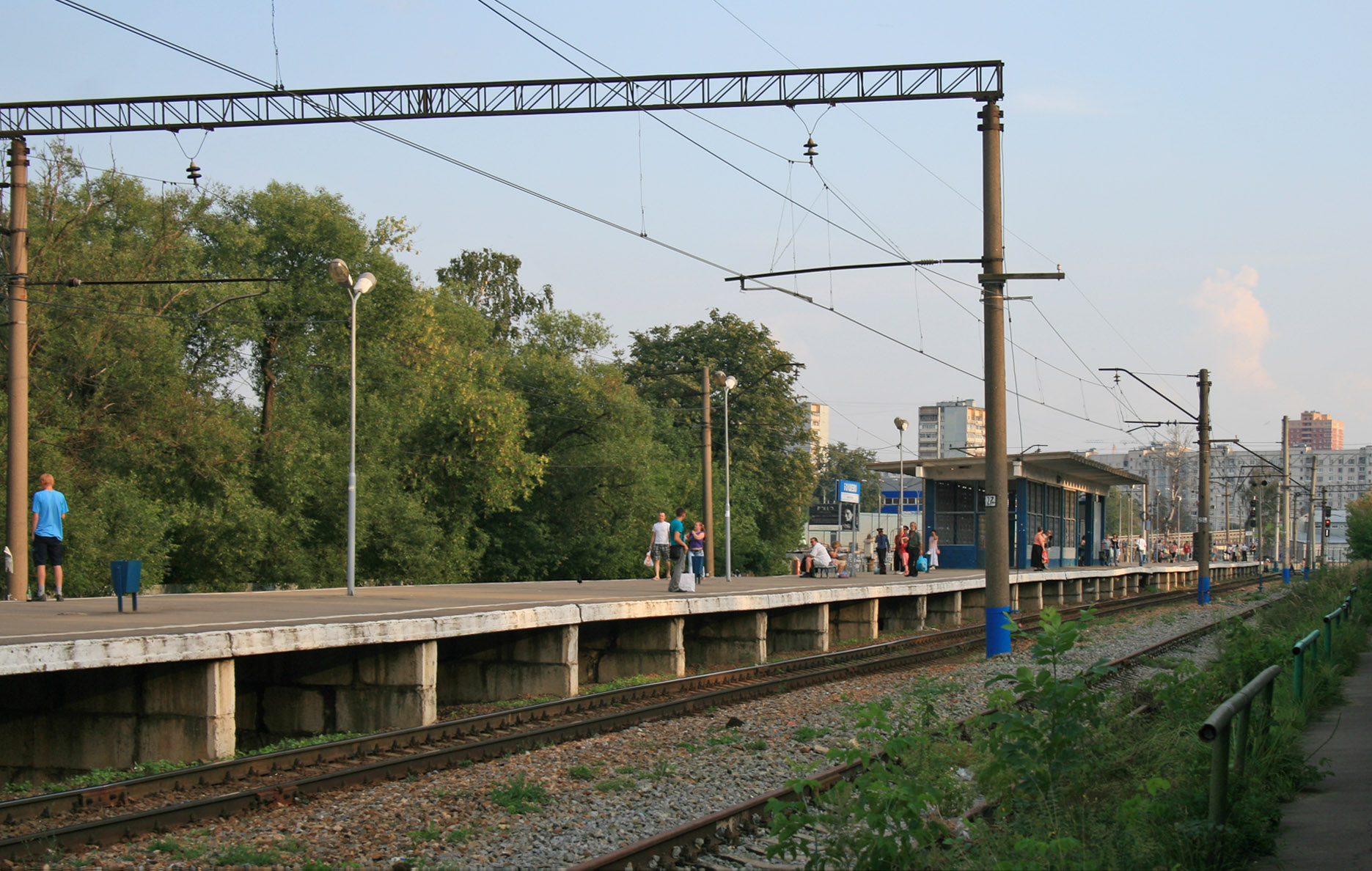
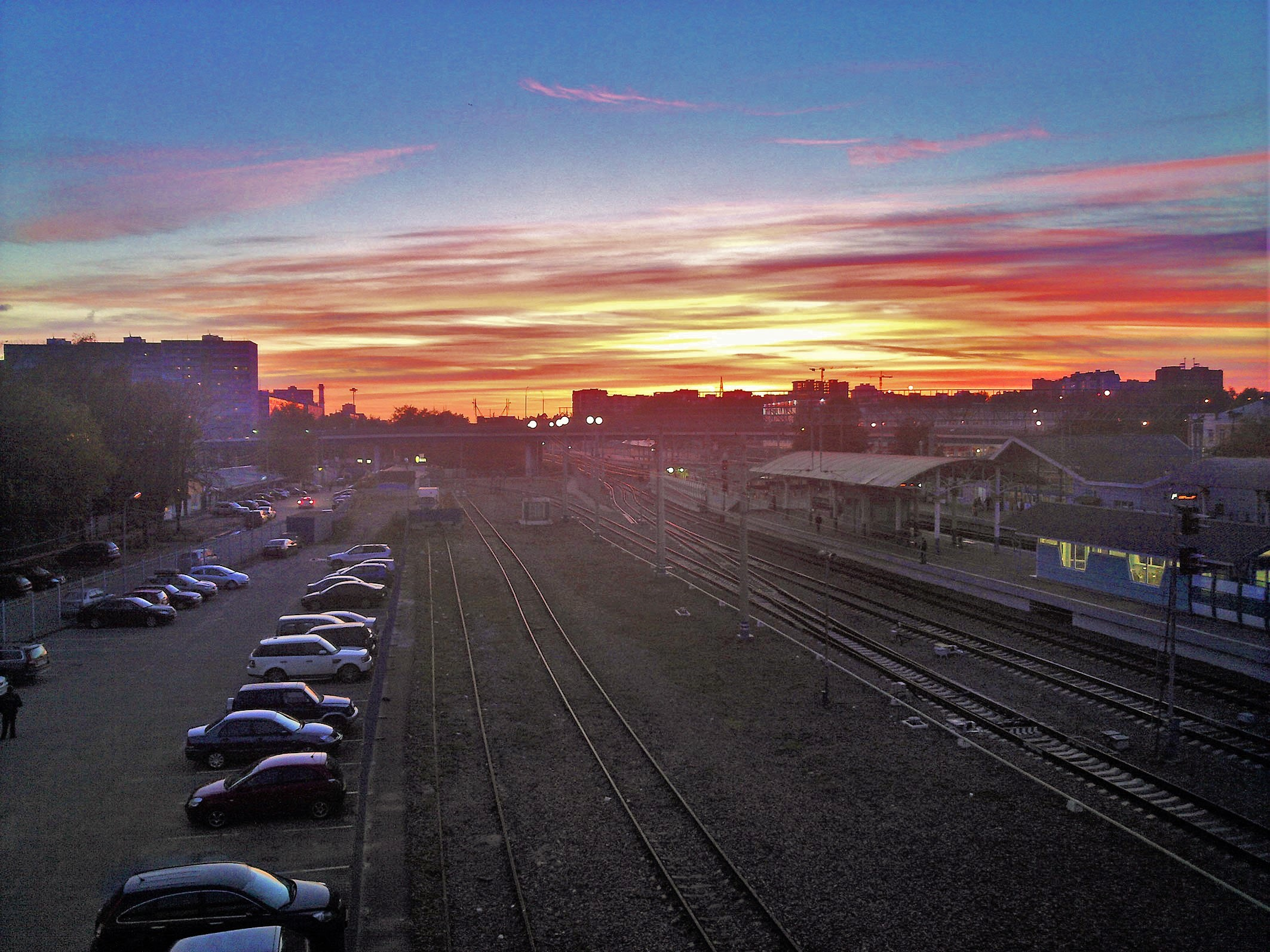

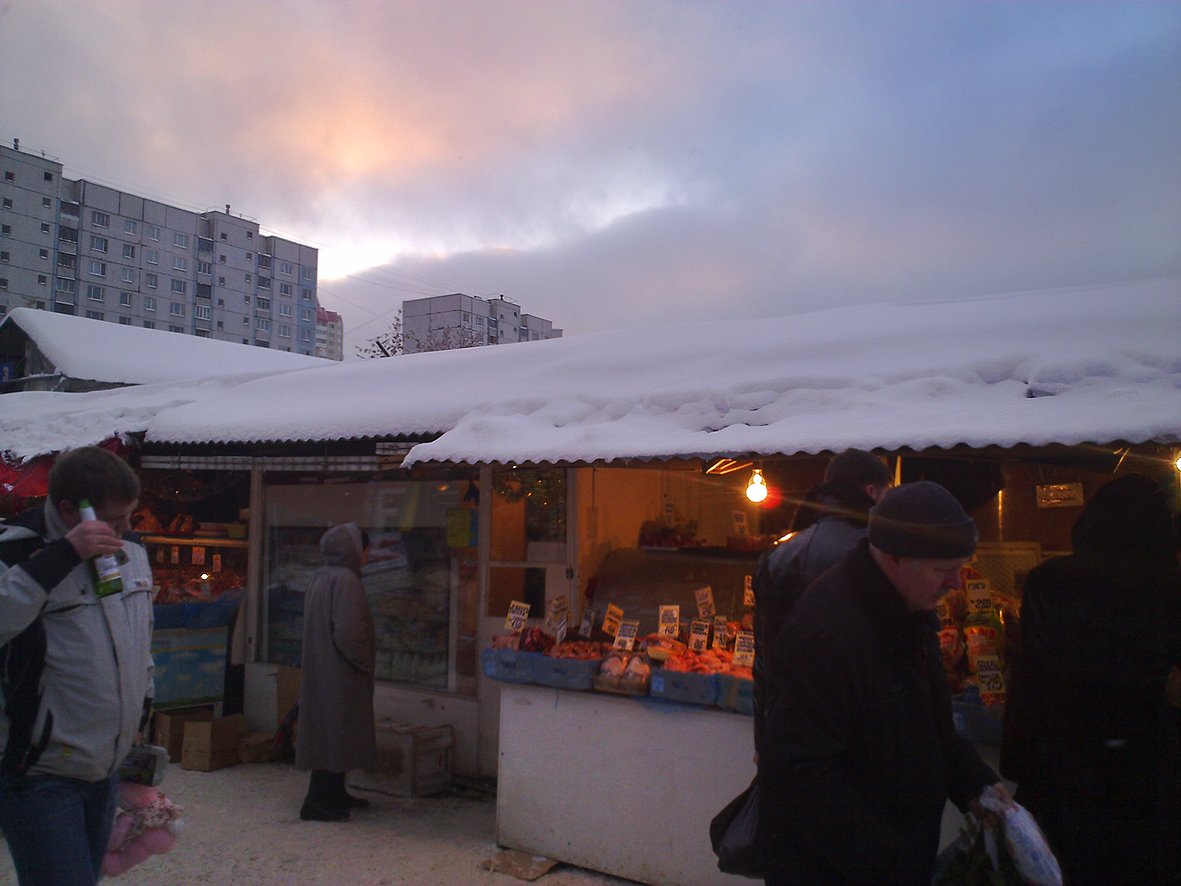

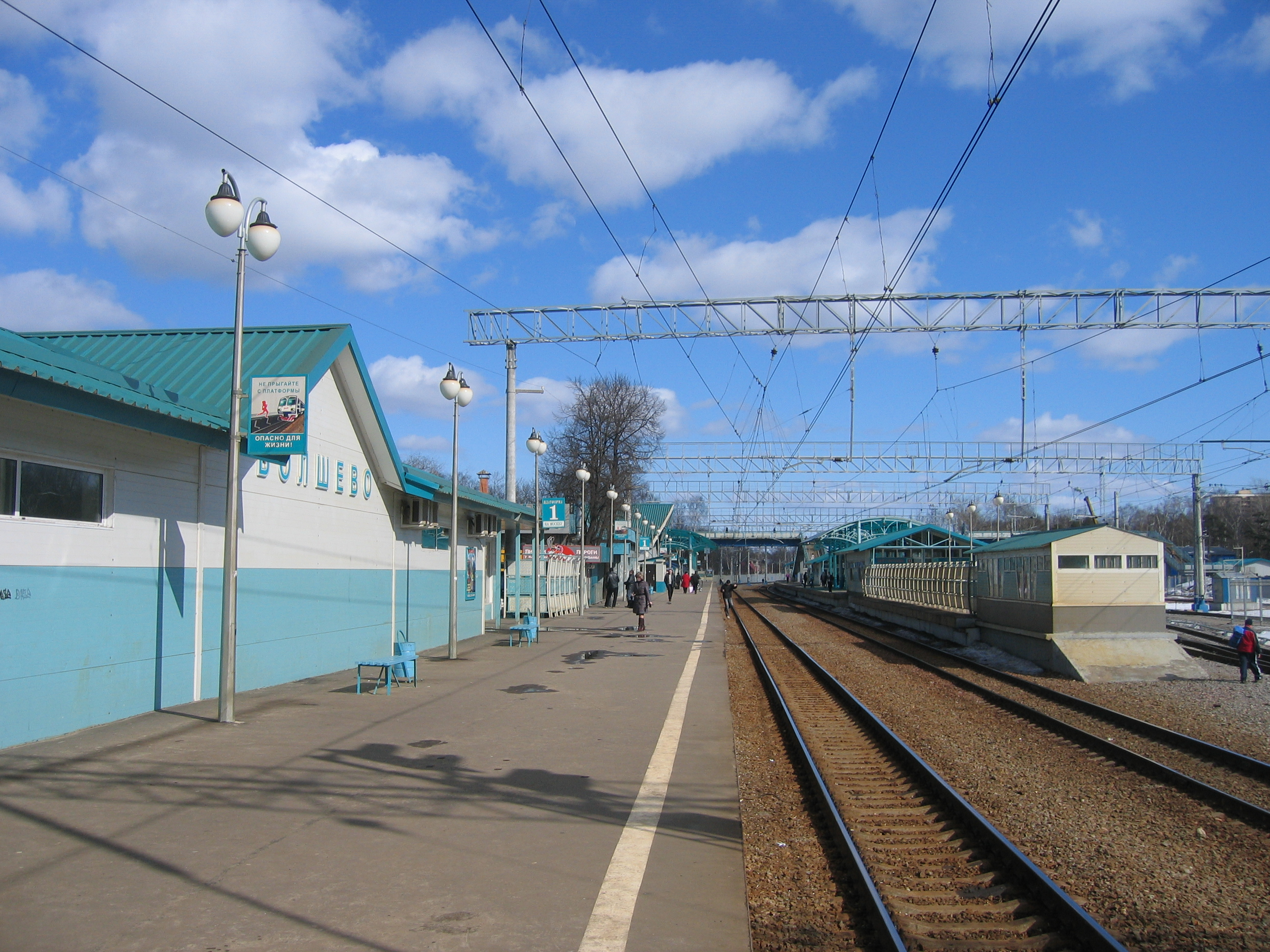
