= Losinoostrovsky District =

Losinoostrovsky District Лосиноостровский район (Russian)
- District
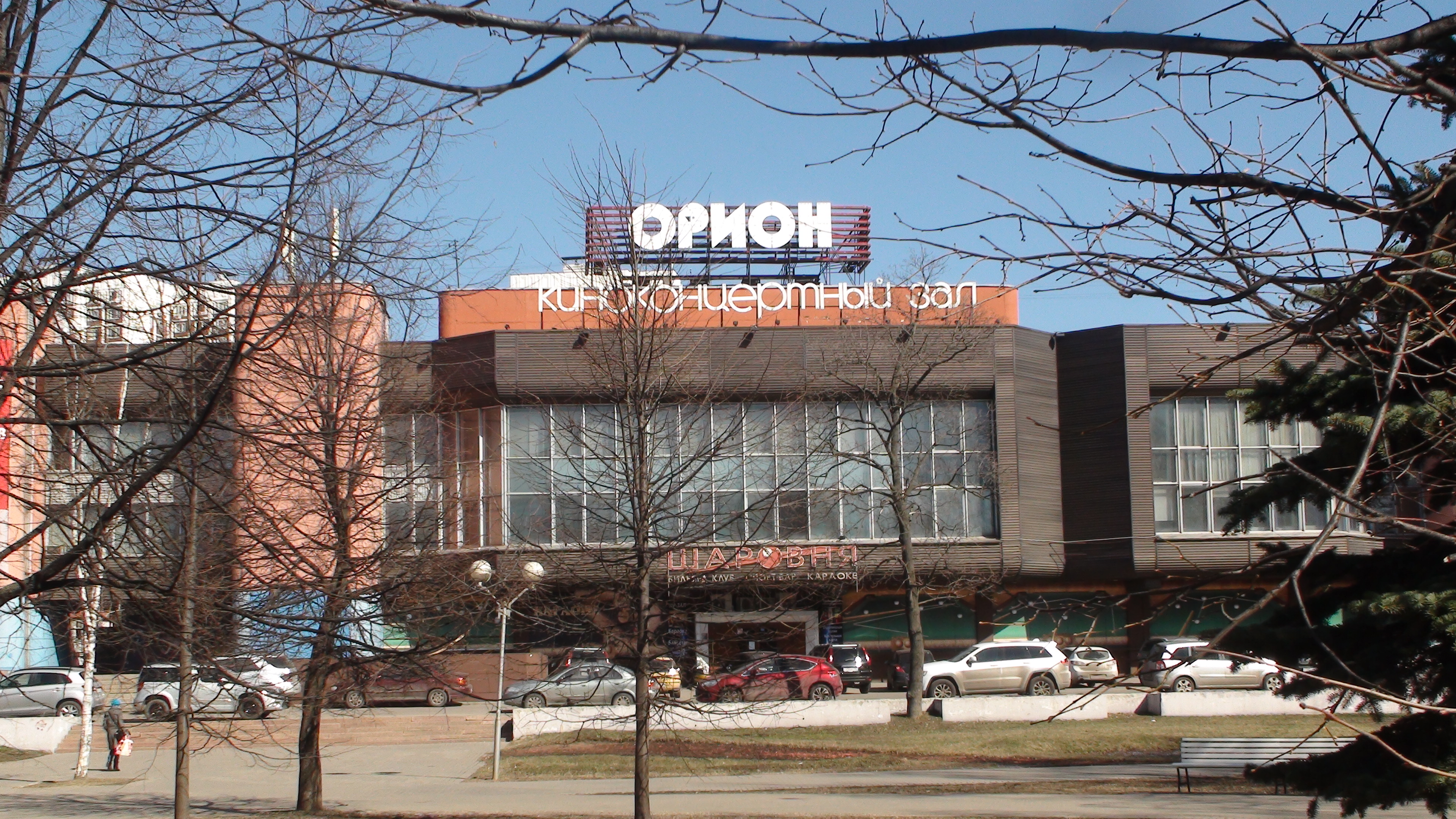
- Movie theater in Losinoostrovsky District

- Flag Coat of arms
- Location of Losinoostrovsky District on the map of Moscow
- Coordinates: 55°53′N 37°42′E
- Country: Russia
- Federal subject: Moscow

Area
  - Total: 5.54 km^{2} (2.14 sq mi)

Population
  - Estimate (2017): 72,100
- Time zone: UTC+
- OKTMO ID: 45355000
- Website: http://www.loinfo.ru/

Losinoostrovsky District (Russian: Лосиноостро́вский райо́н) is an administrative district (raion) of North-Eastern Administrative Okrug, and one of the 125 raions of Moscow, Russia. It is 14 km north of the Moscow city center, located just inside the Moscow Ring Road, with Moscow Oblast to the north, Severnoye Medvedkovo District to the west, Babushkinsky district to the south, and Yarosloavsky District to the east. The area of the district is 5.54 square kilometers (2.14 sq mi). Population: 72,100 (2017 est.). Although its name coincides with Losiny Ostrov National Park, the district does not even border the park. Its name in fact refers to Losinoostrovskaya railway station, in turn named after the park.

== Territory and Boundaries ==
The district is located within the North-Eastern Administrative Okrug of Moscow.

The boundary of the Losinoostrovsky District runs along Menzhinskogo Street, Letchika Babushkina Street, Ostashkovskaya Street, the Moscow Ring Road (MKAD), and the tracks of the Yaroslavl direction of the Moscow Railway.

To the east and southeast, it borders the Yaroslavsky District; to the southwest, it adjoins the Babushkinsky District; and to the northwest, it is adjacent to the Severnoye Medvedkovo District.

The total area of the district is 554 hectares (of which 370.3 hectares are developed land).

Within the district, there are two rivers: the Ichka and the Yauza.

== History ==
=== 1898–1917: The Emergence and Development of the Losinoostrovsky Settlement ===
The first settlement on the territory of what is now the Losinoostrovsky District was founded in 1898, following the opening of the 10th Versta platform of the Moscow-Yaroslavl Railway (later transformed into the Losinoostrovskaya sorting station in 1902). At that time, the forested area between the railway and the Yauza River was allocated by the Department of Appanages for dacha (summer house) plots. The first settlement was named Losinoostrovsk. Closer to the "Perlovskaya" platform, another settlement, Dzhamgarovka, was later established (the name derives from the famous Moscow bankers, the Dzhamgarov brothers, who owned dachas here; the Dzhamgarovs were also among the main developers of the western part of Losinoostrovskaya). To the west, Losinoostrovsk bordered the estates of Richter. Despite the high cost of land (2,400–3,000 rubles per desyatina), the settlements began to be actively developed by the late 1890s. Their growth was facilitated by their proximity to Moscow and convenient railway connections to the capital (from Losinoostrovskaya Station). Additionally, Losinoostrovskaya attracted numerous dacha-goers due to its pine forests; it was believed that the local natural conditions were favorable for treating tuberculosis. The popularity of the area was also explained by its closeness to the capital, with the train journey to Moscow taking 13–15 minutes (in 1913, trains departed approximately every 40 minutes during the summer).

A significant portion of the population consisted of railway station workers.

Shortly after the start of development, at the initiative of the Dzhamgarov brothers, the pond on the Ichka River was deepened. In 1905, a Society for Improvement was organized. The first streets of Losinoostrovskaya were clearings cut through the forest, but by the early 1900s, active improvement began: streets were illuminated with kerosene lamps, a summer theater and tennis court were built, and a volunteer fire brigade was established: 5. By 1905, a "public park, one verst long and covering 14.5 desyatinas": 5—now known as Babushkinsky Park—had been created.

=== Losinoostrovsk in the 1910s ===
One of the Dzhamgarov brothers, Ivan Isaakovich, was a member of the Charitable Prison Committee and, among other things, cared for the children of prisoners, some of whom spent summers in Losinoostrovskaya under the care of Dzhamgarov's wife. The Grinyov family also contributed significantly to the improvement of the new dacha settlement. During the summer, children from several institutions—such as the City Orphanage named after the Bakhrushin Brothers, the Dr. F. P. Haaz Orphanage, and the Elizabeth Alexeevsky Nursery—came to Losinoostrovskaya. Part of the area in this district became known as Dzhamgarovka. On March 14, 1911, the "Society for the Improvement of the Dacha Locality 'Dzhamgarovka'" was established.

By 1913, the settlement had its own telephone substation (established in 1906, serving 60 numbers by 1913), a water supply system, a school (opened in September 1909), a large library (organized at the initiative of Moscow University associate professor A. A. Borzov), a cinema, a summer theater, a post office, a clinic (opened in 1911), several shops, a shelter for elderly women of medical rank (east of the railway), a fire station (near the intersection of present-day Rudneva and Izumrudnaya Streets, the building no longer exists), and a shelter for elderly women of medical rank. Beer shops and taverns selling alcohol were only allowed on nearby peasant lands, as the Department of Appanages and Richter did not permit them on their lands. A stone church dedicated to Adrian and Natalia was built on Yaroslavskoye Highway (architect S. M. Ilyinsky); in 1905–1908, a small wooden church was built near the shelter for women of medical rank (architect K. K. Hippius). Construction of the two-altar Church of the Kazan Icon of the Mother of God in Losinoostrovskaya began in March 1916 with the Kazan Chapel and bell tower, which marked the completion of the construction. In the autumn of 1912, a pedestrian bridge was opened across the railway, connecting the two parts of Losinoostrovsk. From 1909, the monthly newspaper Losinoostrovsky Vestnik was published. The Society for Improvement succeeded in closing a landfill located on the borders of the settlement on Rostokino lands.

By the 1910s, the population of the settlement had become predominantly permanent. In 1917, there were about 1,500 households and 738 wooden houses. In the 1910s, several new settlements appeared near Losinoostrovsk (such as the Krasnaya Sosna settlement and the settlement for trade employees on Yaroslavskoye Highway).

=== After 1917 ===
After 1917, almost all the streets in the settlement were renamed. Along the railway, Trotsky Passage stretched, while on the other side of the tracks, Ulyanovsky Passage appeared. Streets such as Comintern Street, as well as passages named after Karl Marx, Chicherin, Lunacharsky, and Kommunistov, were established.

Until 1921, the settlement of Losinoostrovsk was part of the Sokolniki District of Moscow. On November 27, 1921, it was incorporated into the Moscow Uyezd of Moscow Governorate.

=== The 1920s ===
During the 1920s, the cultural development of the settlement continued. An experimental laboratory museum for the study of the district was organized on Ostashkovskoye Highway. In 1925, Losinoostrovskaya was granted city status. The first city council was located in the building of the former wooden Church of the Holy Trinity on Sovetskaya Street (later it moved to a five-story residential building, now 20/2 Comintern Street). The population of the new city grew rapidly, and Losinoostrovsk developed as a satellite city of Moscow. In 1929, the railway connecting the city to Moscow was electrified. By the 1920s, electric lighting had been introduced in Losinoostrovsky. From the 1930s, industrial development began in the city, with the commissioning of a furniture factory, a musical instrument factory, and a plant producing railway signaling systems, among others. Four schools built at the beginning of the 20th century continued to operate (in 1930, the first brick school was built, replacing the gymnasium that burned down in 1922), and the former zemstvo hospital remained active. A club for railway workers was established on Sovetskaya Street. In the mid-1930s, the Metro Construction Administration built a five-story brick house on the corner of Medvedkovskaya Street (now 2/21 Lenskaya Street), which housed a store, a clinic, a post office, and a radio center. Medical services for the city's residents also improved: in 1927, a clinic was opened on Medvedkovskaya Street, in 1929 a maternity hospital began operating on the same street, and in 1937 a second clinic was established in the northern part of the city, on the territory of the former dacha settlement of Dzhamgarovka.

=== Renaming and Further Development ===
In 1939, the city was renamed in honor of polar aviator M.S. Babushkin, who was born near Losinoostrovskaya (today, a monument to the aviator stands in Babushkinsky Park, and one of the district's main streets is named after him). The main street of the city was Sovetskaya (now Rudneva Street). The primary recreational area for residents was Babushkinsky Park of Culture and Leisure, which featured a wooden cinema, Babushkinsky (now replaced by the Arktika cinema). The park had several sculptural compositions, of which only the monument to A.S. Pushkin has survived to this day. In 1960, the city of Babushkin was incorporated into Moscow. In 1964, a large hospital complex (now Hospital No. 20, 15 Lenskaya Street) was built on the territory of the former city of Babushkin.

=== Post-War Development ===
In the 1950s and 1960s, a significant part of the district was built up with standard brick houses, mostly five stories high. In the 1970s, the blocks north of Malygina Street, as well as Naprudnye Streets, were developed. On the site of the Dzhamgarov estate house, a veterans' hospital was built. The district's dacha past is still recalled by the apple orchards in Torfyanka Park and the numerous cherry trees in the city's courtyards. Until relatively recently, there were more buildings in the district that remembered the dacha life of old Losinka: these included the burned-down houses near Losinoostrovskaya Station and on Comintern Street (the latter, a dacha from the 1910s, was built in the Art Nouveau style); a two-story wooden house from the 1910s (18/14 Izumrudnaya Street), demolished in the summer of 2008.

== See also ==
- Administrative divisions of Moscow
