= Yaroslavsky suburban railway line =

Railway line in Russia

Yaroslavsky Suburban Railway

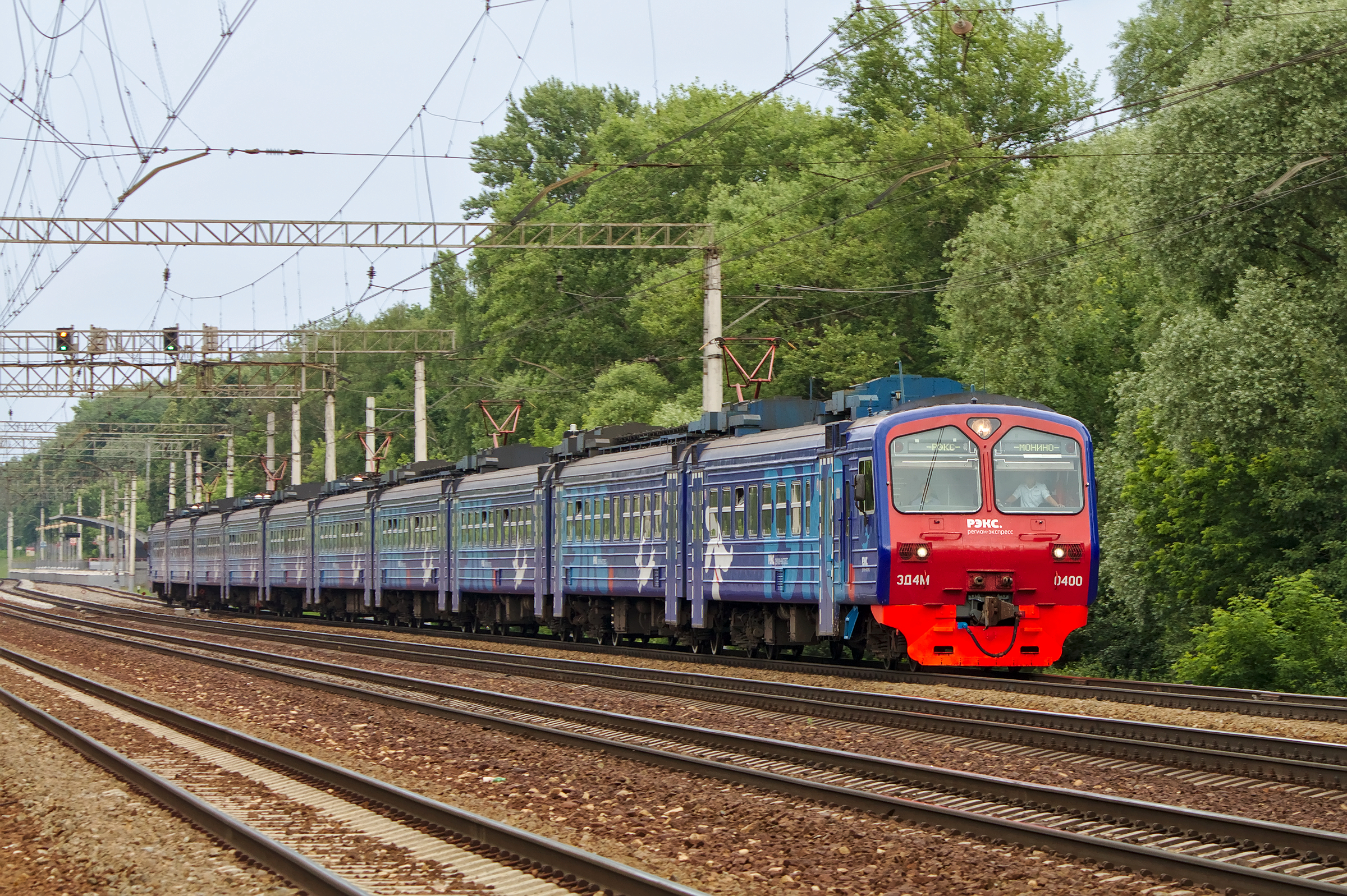

Overview
- Native name: Ярославское направление Московской железной дороги
- Status: Operational
- Owner: Russian Railways
- Locale: Moscow Oblast
- Termini: Moscow Yaroslavsky; Balakirevo
- Stations: 72 (including branches)

Service
- Type: Commuter rail Heavy rail
- System: Moscow Railway
- Operator(s): Central Suburban Passenger Company; Russian Railways
- Depot(s): Moskva-2; Moskva-3

History
- Opened: 18 August 1862

Technical
- Line length: 129 km (80 mi)
- Track gauge: 1,520 mm (4 ft 11 27/32 in) Russian gauge
- Electrification: 3 kV DC overhead line

The Yaroslavsky suburban railway line (Russian: Ярославское направление Московской железной дороги) is one of eleven railway lines used for suburban railway connections between Moscow, Russia, and surrounding areas, mostly in Moscow Oblast as well as in Alexandrovsky District of Vladimir Oblast. The railway line connects Moscow with the stations in the northeastern part of the Moscow oblast, in particular, with the towns of Mytishchi, Korolyov, Ivanteyevka, Fryazino, Shchyolkovo, Pushkino, Krasnoarmeysk, Sergiyev Posad, Strunino, and Alexandrov. All suburban services operating on the line have their southwestern terminus at Moscow Yaroslavsky railway station in Moscow. In the northeastern direction, the suburban trains terminate at Bolshevo, Fryazino Passazhirskaya, Monino, Shchyolkovo, Fryazevo, Pushkino, Sofrino, Krasnoarmeysk, Sergiyev Posad, Alexandrov, and Balakirevo stations. The line is under the jurisdiction of the Moscow Railway (a subsidiary of Russian Railways) and is operated by the Central Suburban Passenger Company.

== Stations and services ==
The suburban railway line follows the railway which connects Moscow with Yaroslavl and continues to Arkhangelsk in the north and Vladivostok in the south. It is electrified (dc current) between Moscow and Balakirevo (and further to Danilov). Between Moscow and Balakirevo, there are at least two tracks. The distance between Yaroslavsky railway station and Balakirevo is 129 kilometres (80 mi). In Fryazevo, the railway connects to the Gorkovsky suburban railway line. The section between 81 km and Alexandrov coincides with the Greater Ring of the Moscow Railway.

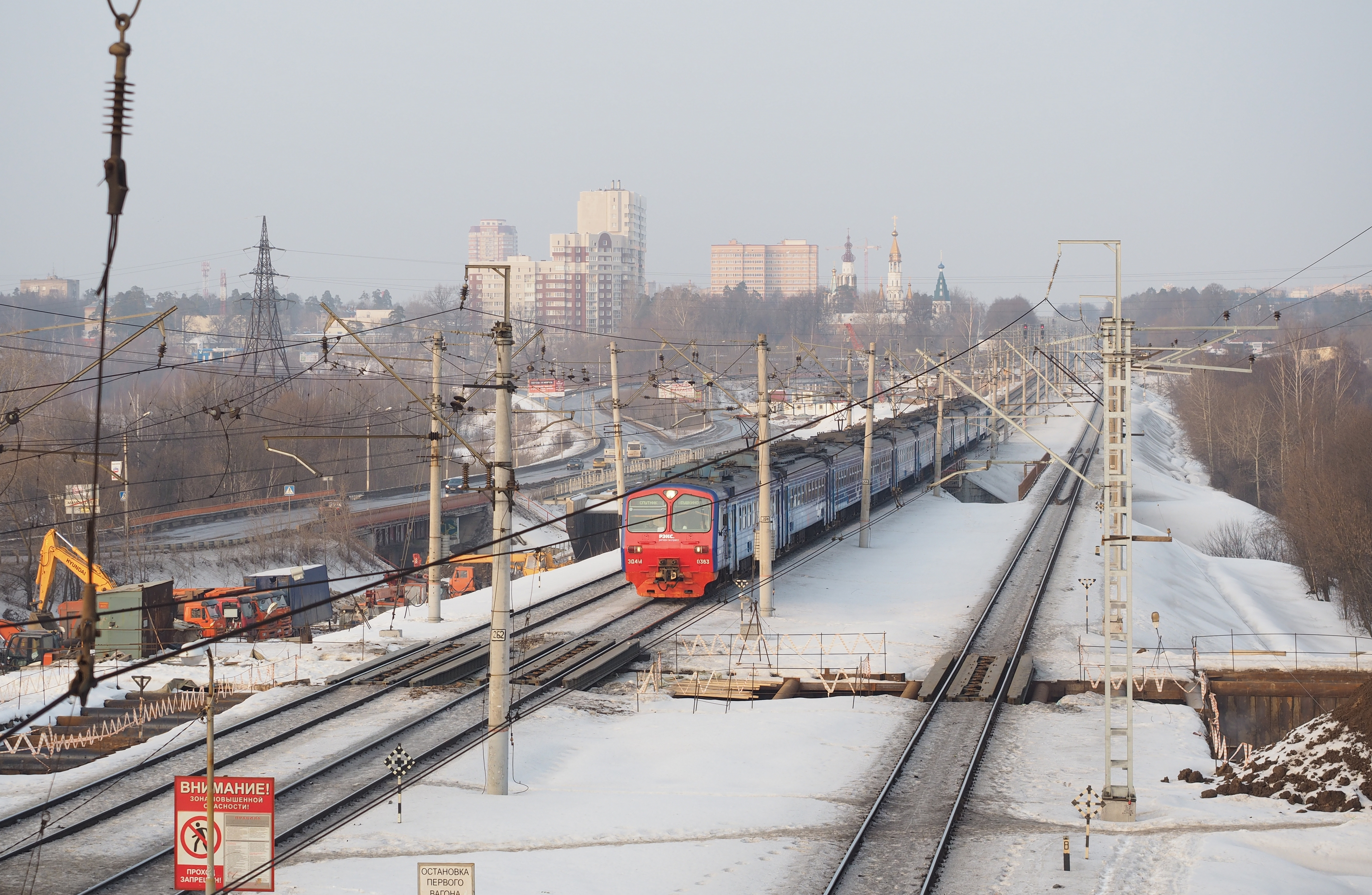
Main line in city of Pushkino, limited express train Reks and construction of 4th track (2015)

Yaroslavsky suburban direction provide commuter traffic to dense populated area and cities of Mytishchi, Bolshevo, Pushkino. At 2010-s an additional 4th track was built on main line to Pushkino, in rush hours a 27 pair of commuter trains per hour is possible.

Following the standard notations in Russia, a railway station below is called a station if it is a terminus or if it has a cargo terminal, and it is called a platform (railway stop) otherwise.

=== Moscow to Balakirevo ===
1. Moscow Yaroslavsky railway station, transfer to Komsomolskaya metro station (Sokolnicheskaya line), Komsomolskaya metro station (Koltsevaya line);
2. Moskva-3 (platform);
3. Malenkovskaya (platform);
4. Yauza (platform);
5. Rostokino (platform), Rostokino station of Moscow Central Circle;
6. Losinoostrovskaya (station);
7. Los (platform);
8. Perlovskaya (platform);
9. Tayninskaya (platform);
10. Mytishchi (station), connection to Fryazino Passazhirskaya and Fryazevo;
11. Stroitel (platform);
12. Chelyuskinskaya (platform);
13. Tarasovskaya (platform);
14. Klyazma (platform);
15. Mamontovskaya (platform);
16. Pushkino (station);
17. Zavety Ilyicha (platform);
18. Pravda (platform);
19. Zelenogradskaya (platform);
20. 43 km (platform);
21. Sofrino (station), connection to Krasnoarmeysk;
22. Ashukinskaya (platform);
23. Kalistovo (platform);
24. Radonezh (platform);
25. Abramtsevo (platform);
26. Khotkovo (station);
27. Semkhoz (platform);
28. Sergiyev Posad (station);
29. 76 km (platform);
30. 81 km (platform), connection to Greater Ring of the Moscow Railway;
31. 83 km (platform);
32. Buzhaninovo (station);
33. 90 km (platform);
34. Arsaki (station);
35. Strunino (station);
36. Alexandrov I (station), connections to Ivanovo and Orekhovo-Zuyevo;
37. 117 km (platform, no direct connections to Moscow);
38. Moshnino (platform, no direct connections to Moscow);
39. Balakirevo (station), connections to Yaroslavl.

=== Mytishchi to Fryazevo ===
1. Mytishchi (station);
2. Podlipki-Dachnye (station);
3. Bolshevo (station);
4. Valentinovka (platform);
5. Zagoryanskaya (platform);
6. Sokolovskaya (station);
7. Voronok (platform);
8. Shchyolkovo (station);
9. Gagarinskaya (platform);
10. Chkalovskaya (platform);
11. Bakhchivandzhi (platform);
12. Tsiolkovskaya (platform);
13. Oseyevskaya (platform);
14. Monino (station);
15. Kashino (platform);
16. Kolontayevo (platform);
17. Lesnaya (platform);
18. Fryazevo (station), connection to Gorkovsky suburban railway line.

=== Mytishchi to Fryazino ===
1. Mytishchi (station);
2. Podlipki-Dachnye (station);
3. Bolshevo (station);
4. Fabrika 1 Maya (platform);
5. Zelyony Bor (platform);
6. Ivanteyevka-2 (platform);
7. Ivanteyevka (station);
8. Detskaya (platform);
9. Fryazino Tovarnaya (platform);
10. Fryazino Passazhirskaya (platform).

=== Sofrino to Krasnoarmeysk ===
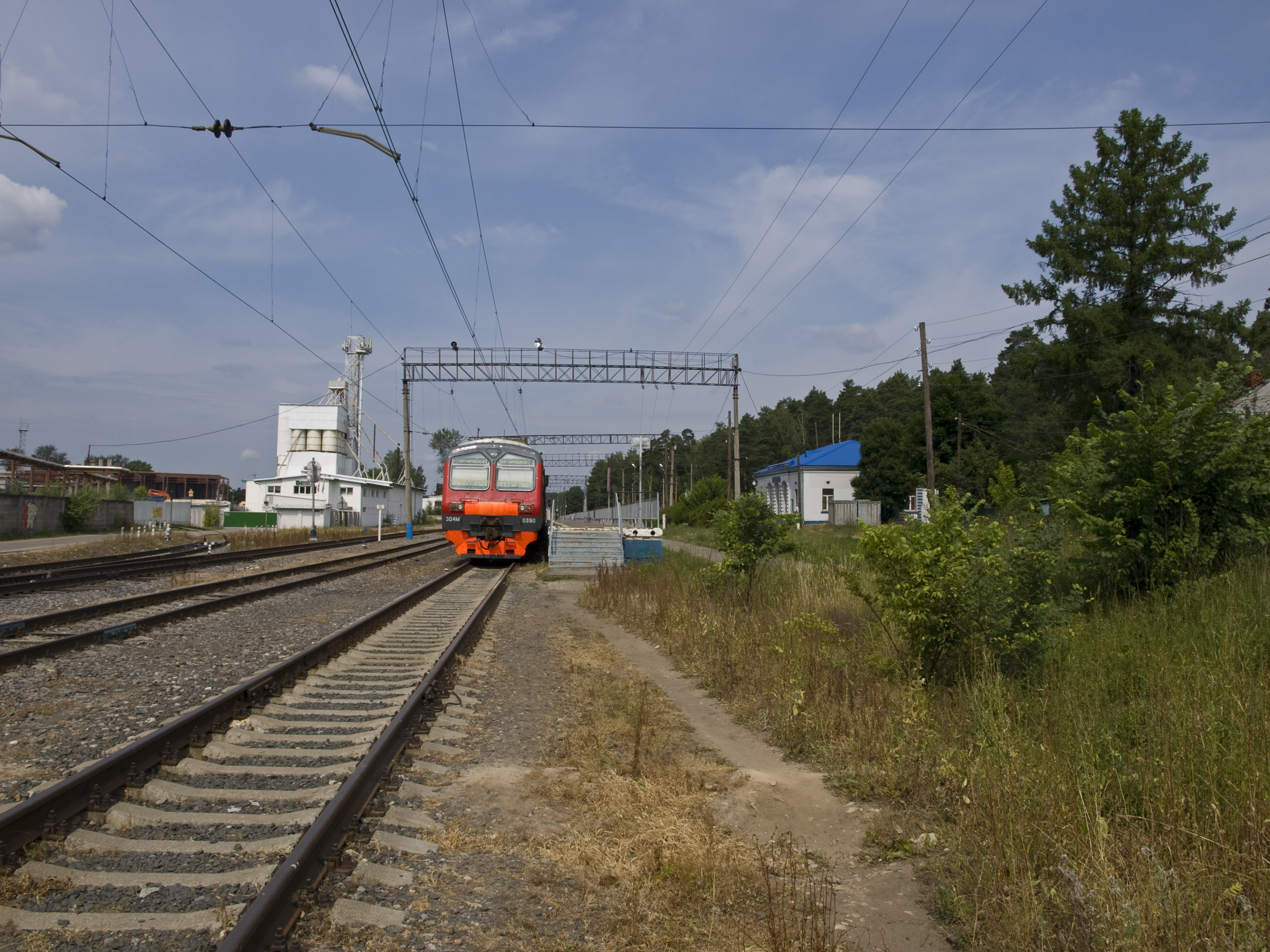
Krasnoarmeysk

1. Sofrino (station);
2. Rakhmanovo (platform);
3. Fyodorovskoye (platform);
4. Putilovo (platform);
5. Krasnoarmeysk (station).

== History ==
The construction of the railway between Moscow and Sergiyev Posad was completed in 1862. The passenger traffic was opened on August 18, 1862, and the freight traffic on the Moscow - Sergiev Posad section was opened on October 3, 1862. In 1869, it was extended to Yaroslavl. The railway line between Mytishchi and Fryazevo was open in several installments: In 1895, to Shchyolkovo, in 1929 to Monino, in 1930 to Ivanteyevka, in 1935 to Fryazino, and in 1970 to Fryazevo.

In the 1920s, Yaroslavsky suburban railway line became the first suburban railway line in the Soviet Union to be electrified. In 1929, the electrification was completed between Moscow and Mytishchi. In 1930, the electrification was extended to Pushkino and Shchyolkovo, in 1931 to Sofrino, and in 1932 to Zagorsk (currently Sergiyev Posad). In the 1930s, some suburban trains run to Mytishchi and then were separated, with one part running to Pushkino, and another one to Shchyolkovo. The far distance passenger trains were still moved by steam locomotives. In 1937, the electrification was extended to Alexandrov. However, the section between Moscow and Zagorsk used dc current with 1500 Volts, and the one between Zagorsk and Alexandrov used dc current with 3000 Volts, therefore it was not suitable for suburban trains. In 1949, first suburban trains able to work with both voltages appeared, subsequently the railway platforms between Zagorsk and Alexandrov were raised to serve these trains, and in 1949 direct suburban trains from Moscow started to serve Alexandrov. During World War II, the wires were removed, and suburban trains were moved by steam locomotives, however, in 1943 the suburban railway line was re-electrified. In 1934, the section between Mytishchi and Chkalovakaya was electrified. In 1936, the electrification was extended to Monino, in 1948 to Fryazino. The section between Monino and Fryazevo was constructed electrified. In 1994, the electrification was extended to Krasnoarmeysk, and direct trains from Moscow started running.

=== Former connecting lines ===
In 1900, a railway line connecting Beskudnikovo and Losinoostrovskaya was constructed. This was done in order to facilitate the railway traffic between Moscow and Kimry (Savyolovo), since Moscow Savyolovsky railway station was not open yet. After a tram line from central line to Medvedkovo was built, in 1966 a direct connection to Losinoostrovskaya was discontinued, and the whole railway line was demolished in 1987.

Map of closed Losinoostrovskaya - Beskudnikovo line

In 1930, a railway line between Mytishchi and Pirogovo was built. It was closed down in 1997 and subsequently demolished.

Map of closed Pirogovo branch
