= Malenkovskaya railway station =

Railway station in Moscow

Malenkovskaya Маленковская
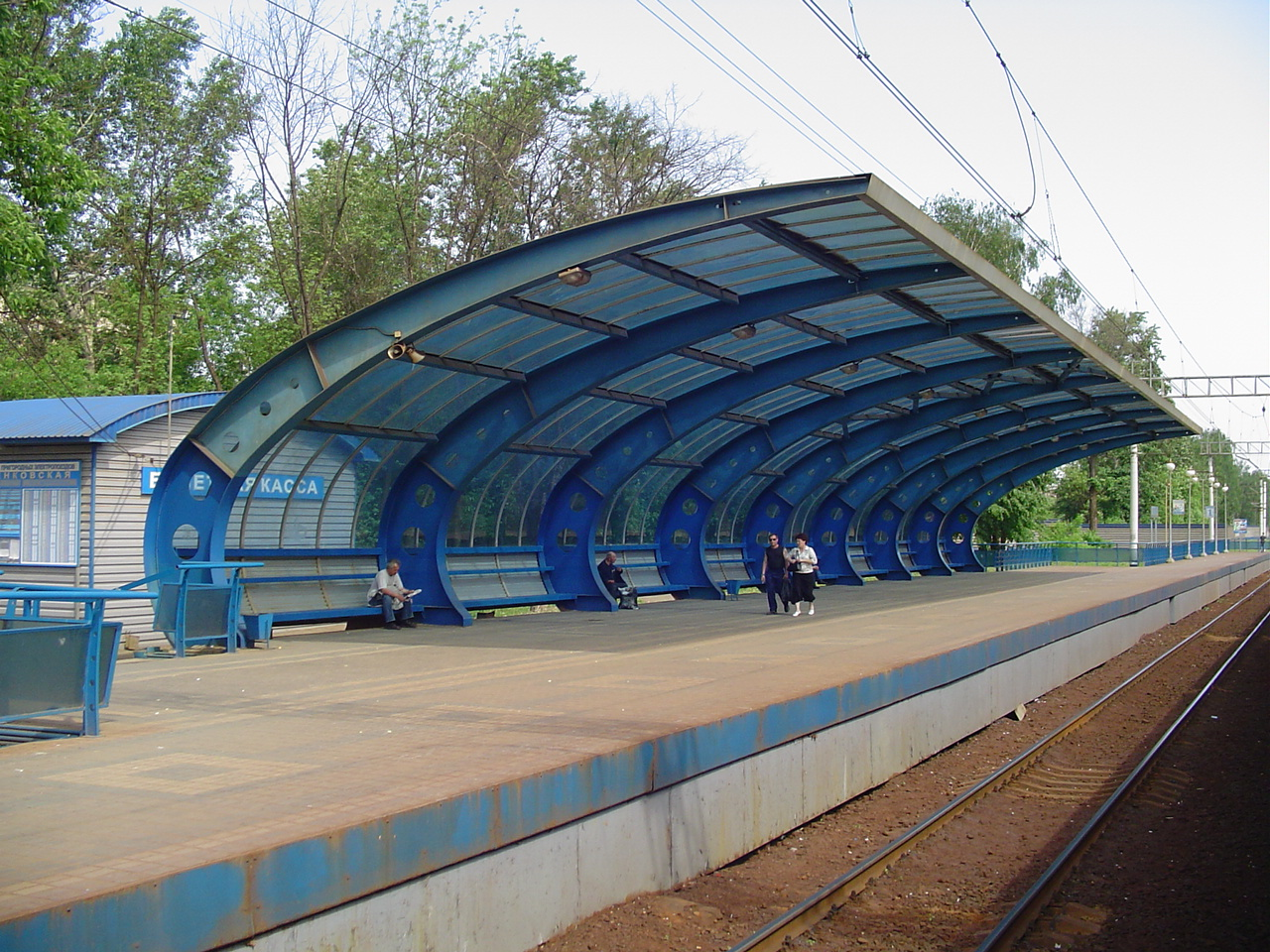

General information
- Location: Eastern and North-Eastern Administrative Okrug, Moscow; Russia
- Coordinates: 55.814°N 37.663°E
- Owner: Russian Railways
- Operator: Moscow Railway
- Line: Yaroslavsky Suburban Line
- Platforms: 3
- Tracks: 4
- Connections: Bus: 14m, 98m, 278m, 286, 714

Construction
- Structure type: At-grade
- Platform levels: 1

Other information
- Station code: 195 529
- Fare zone: 1

History
- Opened: 1934
- Rebuilt: 2000s

Services
Preceding station	Russian Railways	Following station
Moskva-3 towards Moscow Yaroslavsky	Yaroslavsky Suburban	Yauza towards Balakirevo
Route map
Location
- Location within Moscow Ring Road

Malenkovskaya is a train station on the Yaroslavsky suburban railway line in Moscow, Russia. It is located on the border of Eastern and North-Eastern Administrative Okrugs, 4.5 kilometres (2.8 mi) from Yaroslavsky railway terminal.

There are exits at the Rizhsky Proezd and 4 Luchevoy Prosek in the Sokolniki Park.
