= Moskva-3 railway station =

Railway station in Moscow, Russia

Moskva-3 Москва III
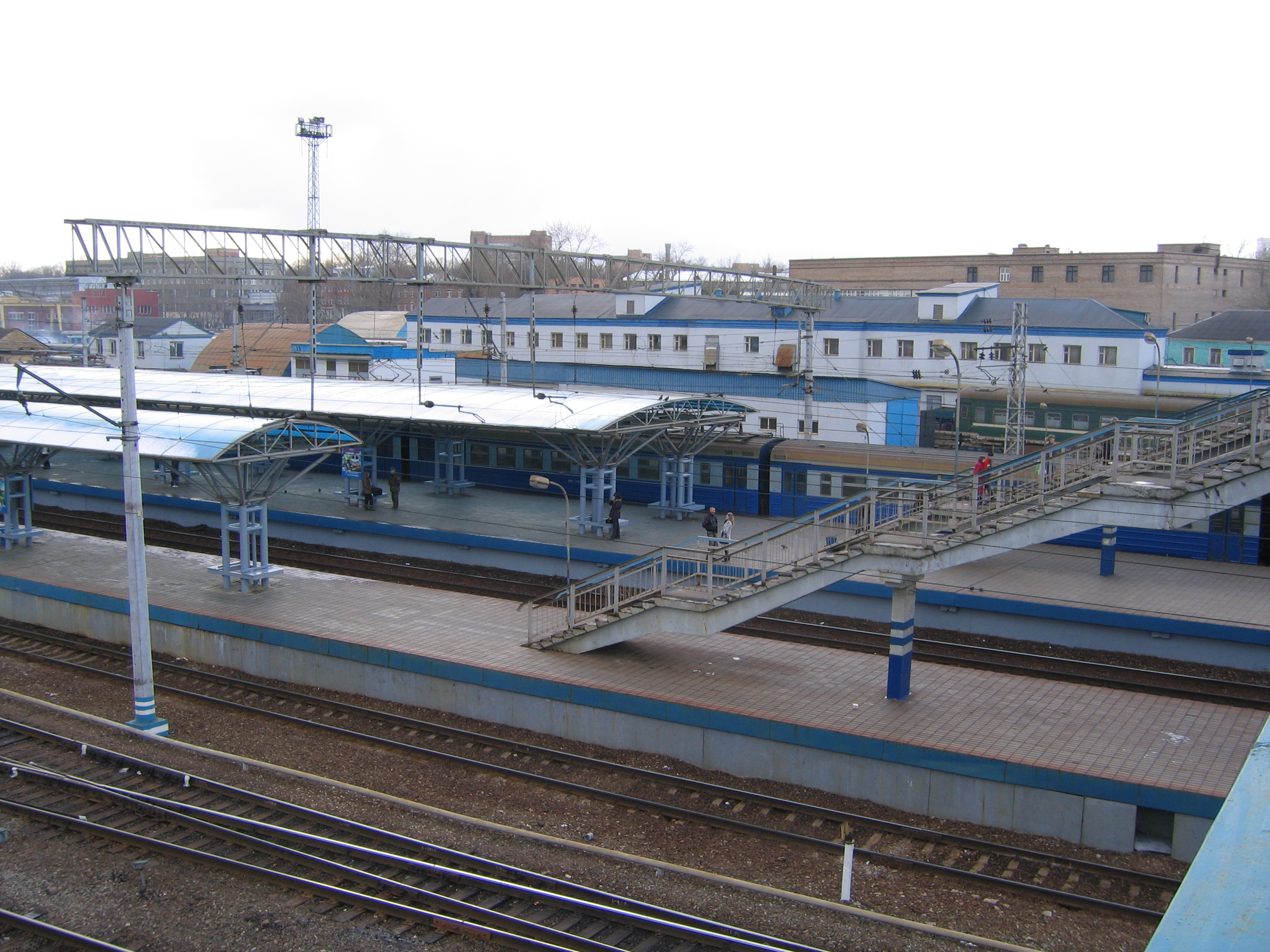

General information
- Location: North-Eastern Administrative Okrug, Moscow; Russia
- Coordinates: 55.802°N 37.652°E
- Owner: Russian Railways
- Operator: Moscow Railway
- Line: Yaroslavsky Suburban Line
- Platforms: 2
- Tracks: 4

Construction
- Structure type: At-grade
- Platform levels: 1

Other information
- Station code: 195 514
- Fare zone: 1

History
- Opened: 1929
- Rebuilt: 2000s

Services
Preceding station	Russian Railways	Following station
Moscow Yaroslavsky Terminus	Yaroslavsky Suburban	Malenkovskaya towards Balakirevo
Route map
Location
- Location within Moscow Ring Road

Moskva-3 is a train station on the Yaroslavsky suburban railway line. It is located in the North-Eastern Administrative Okrug, Moscow, 3 kilometres (1.9 mi) from Yaroslavsky Rail Terminal.

It consists of two insular platforms while the western one is broader and more heavily used. There are 4 tracks available. The platforms are connected to each other with the pedestrian bridge. In the middle of the platforms, semi-transparent roofs are installed. The south end of the platforms is curved. The platforms are surrounded by the depot tracks so the only way in and out is via the bridge.

Moskva-3 and Moskva-2 depots are located nearby.

Alekseyevskaya metro station is reachable in around 10–15 minutes of walk and many passengers use this interchange in order to pay less (Yaroslavsky Rail Terminal and Moskva-3 station are in different tariff zones). Also Rizhskaya railway station is located not far from Moskva-3.

There are exits at 1 Mytishchinskaya Street and 2 Luchevoy Prosek in Sokolniki Park.

The station was constructed in 1929 for the use of VNIIZhT.
