= Bolshevo railway station =

Railway station in Moscow Oblast, Russia

Bolshevo Болшево
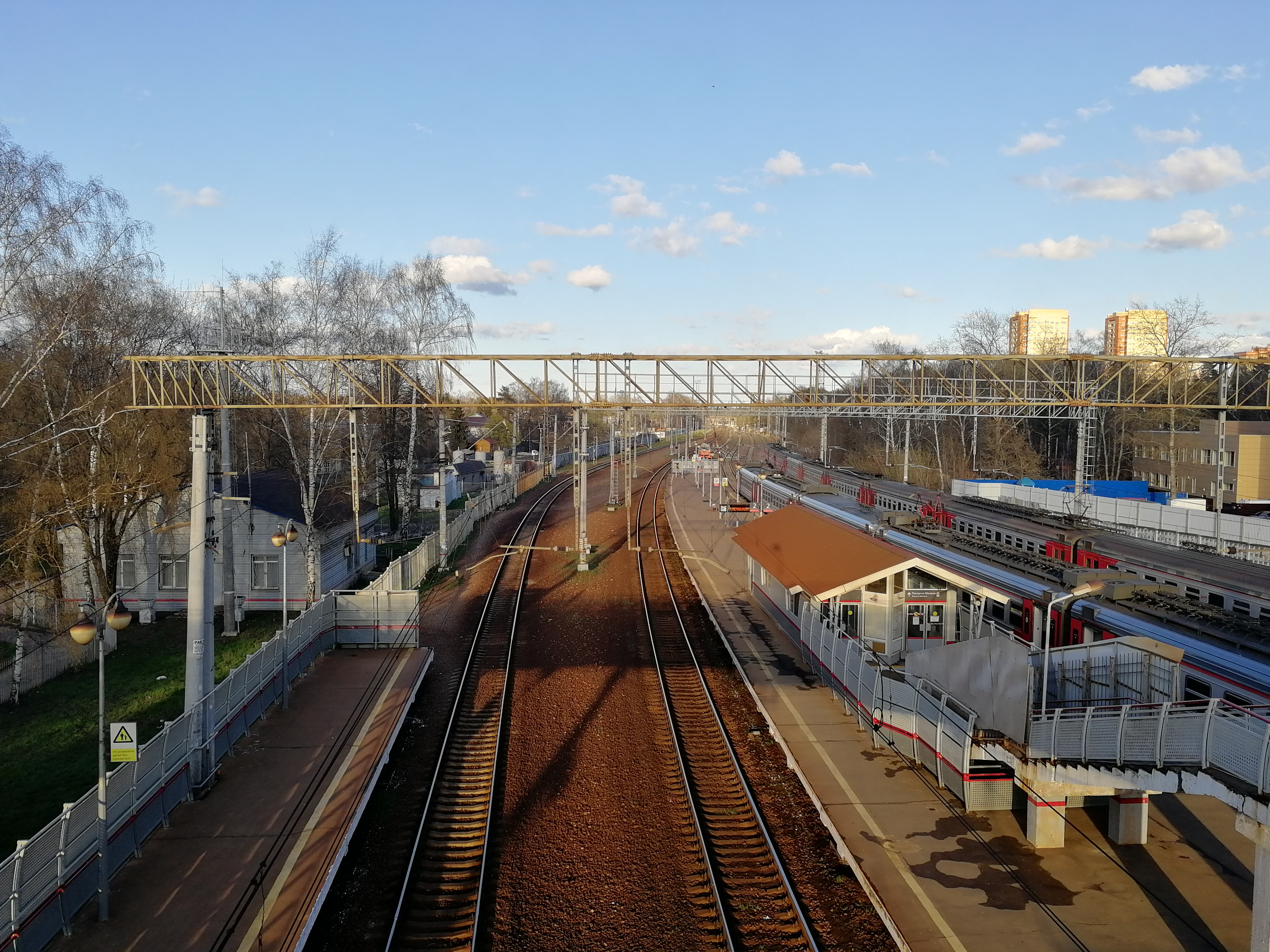

General information
- Location: Bolshevo, Moscow Oblast; Russia
- Coordinates: 55.9262°N 37.8611°E
- System: Moscow Railway station
- Owner: Russian Railways
- Operator: Moscow Railway
- Line: Yaroslavsky Suburban Line
- Platforms: 2
- Tracks: 2

Construction
- Structure type: At-grade

Other information
- Station code: 2002080
- Fare zone: 2

History
- Opened: 1896

Services
Preceding station	Russian Railways	Following station
Podlipki-Dachnye towards Mytishchi	Yaroslavsky Suburban Fryazevo Branch	Valentinovka towards Fryazevo
Podlipki-Dachnye towards Mytishchi	Yaroslavsky Suburban Fryazino Branch	Fabrika 1 Maya towards Fryazino Passazhirskaya
Location

Bolshevo railway station is a railway station in Moscow Oblast, Russia. It is located on the Mytishchi-Fryazino section of the Yaroslavsky suburban railway line. It is part of the Naukograd, or science city, of Korolyov.

== History ==
It takes its name from the historic settlement of Bolshevo. The station was opened 1896 as part of the Shchyolkovo-Mytishchi branch. A historic photograph of the station was featured in the 2019 exhibition Station Bolshevo: the crossroads of fate, 1939.

== Photos ==
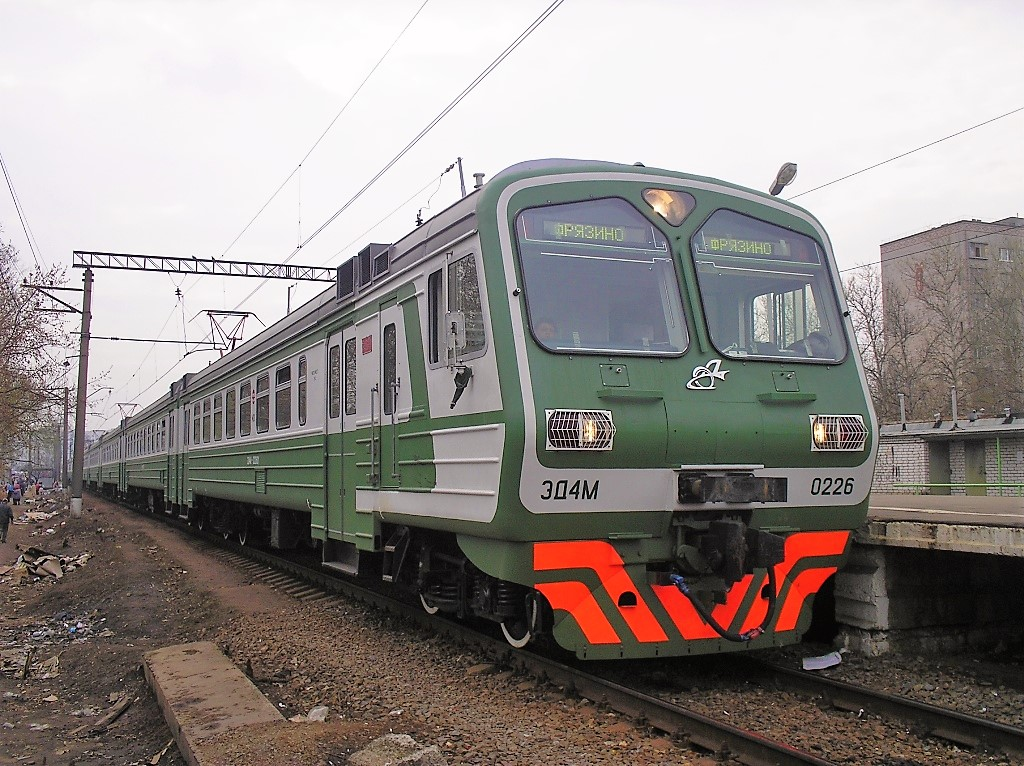
ED4 train in Bolshevo railway station

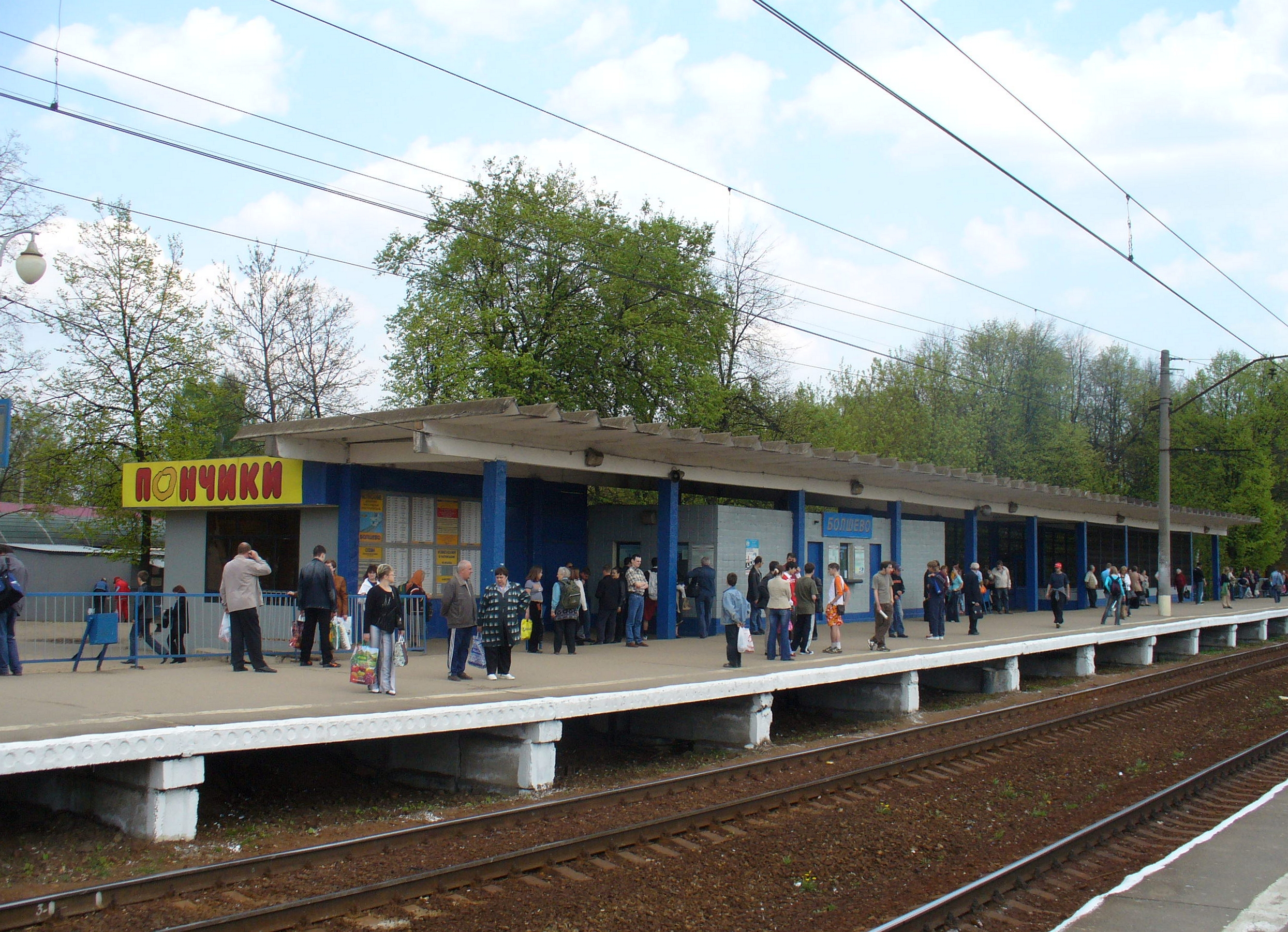
Bolshevo railway station in 2006

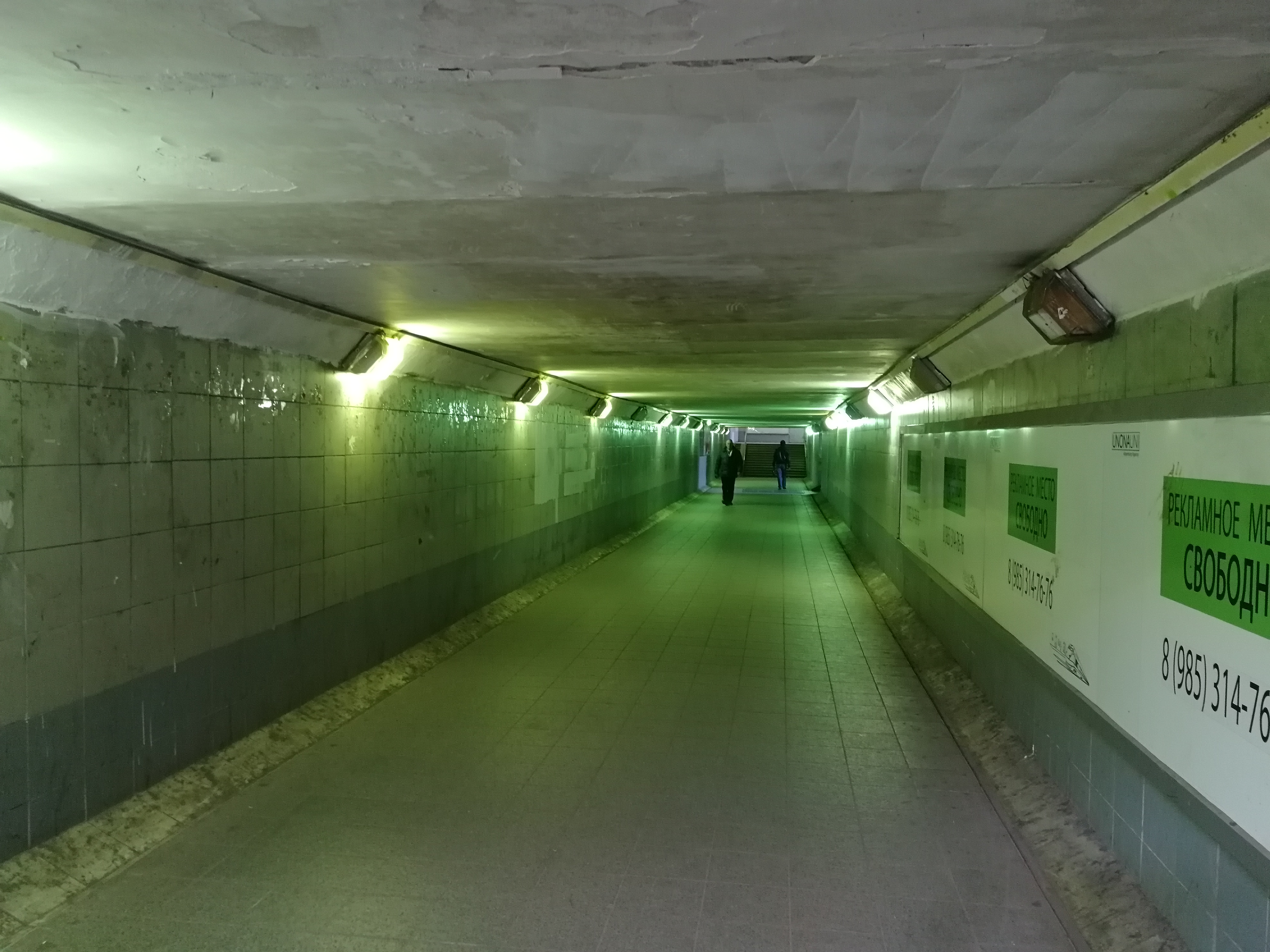
Underpass at Bolshevo railway station

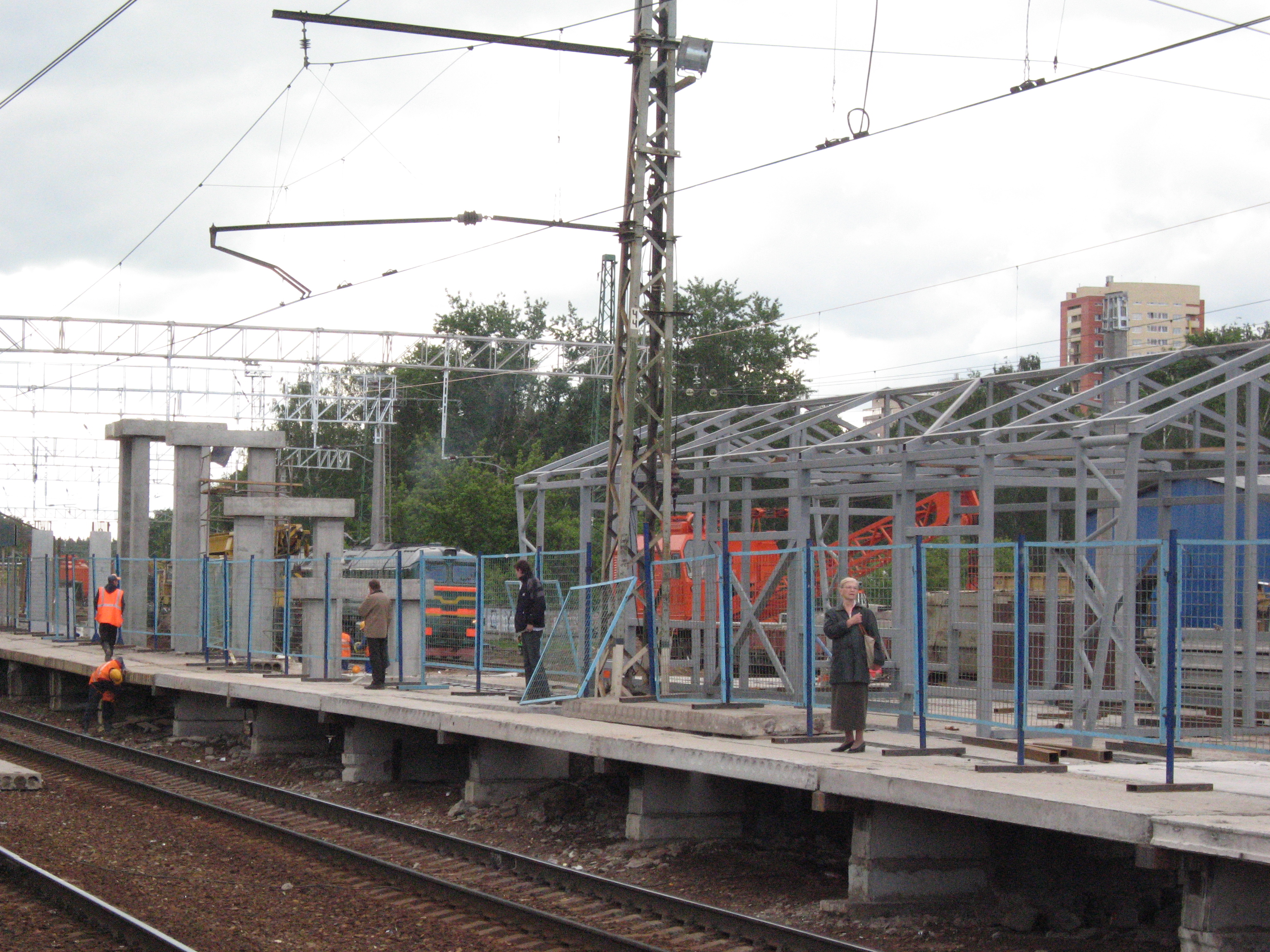
Building work in 2008

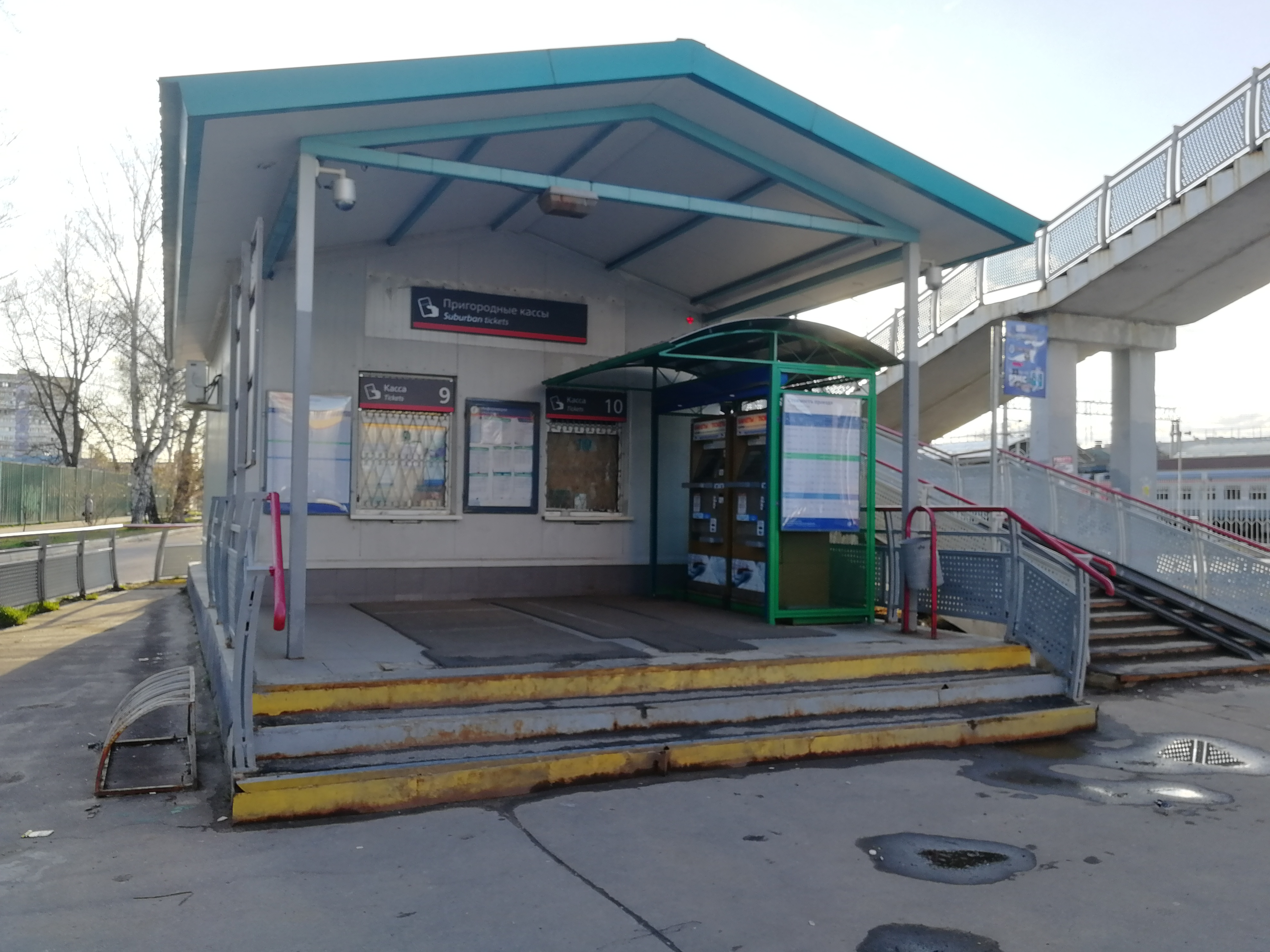
Ticket machines
