= Yauza railway station =

Railway station in Russia

Yauza Яуза
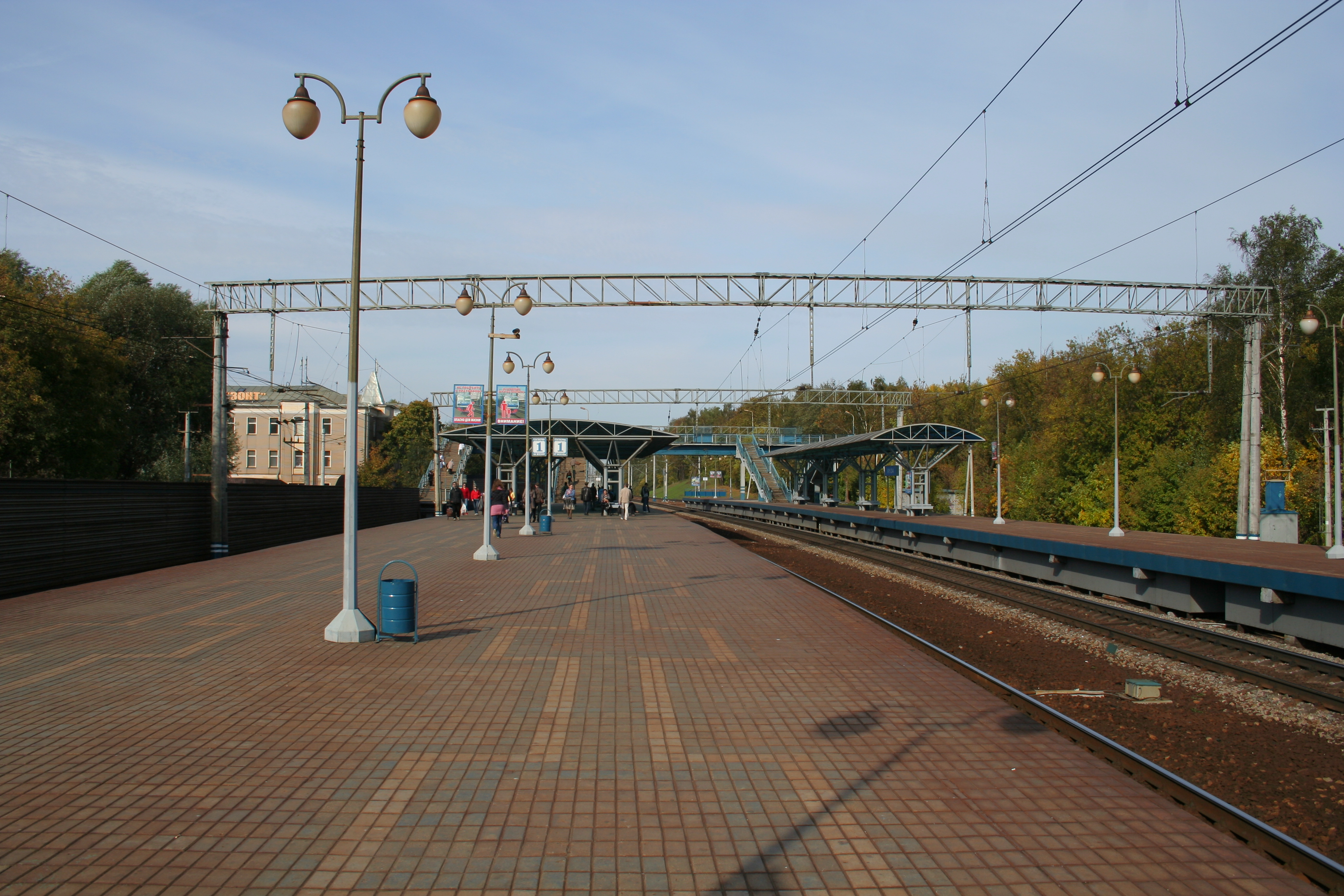

General information
- Location: Eastern and North-Eastern Administrative Okrug; Moscow; Russia
- Coordinates: 55.828889°N 37.671111°E
- System: Moscow Railway station
- Owner: Russian Railways
- Operator: Moscow Railway
- Line: Yaroslavsky Suburban Line
- Platforms: 2
- Tracks: 4
- Connections: Bus: 56, 63; Share taxi: 56m, 195m

Construction
- Structure type: At-grade
- Platform levels: 1

Other information
- Station code: 195 533
- Fare zone: 2

History
- Opened: 1915
- Rebuilt: 2000s
- Electrified: 1929

Services
Preceding station	Russian Railways	Following station
Malenkovskaya towards Moscow Yaroslavsky	Yaroslavsky Suburban	Severyanin towards Balakirevo
Route map
Location
- Location within Moscow Ring Road

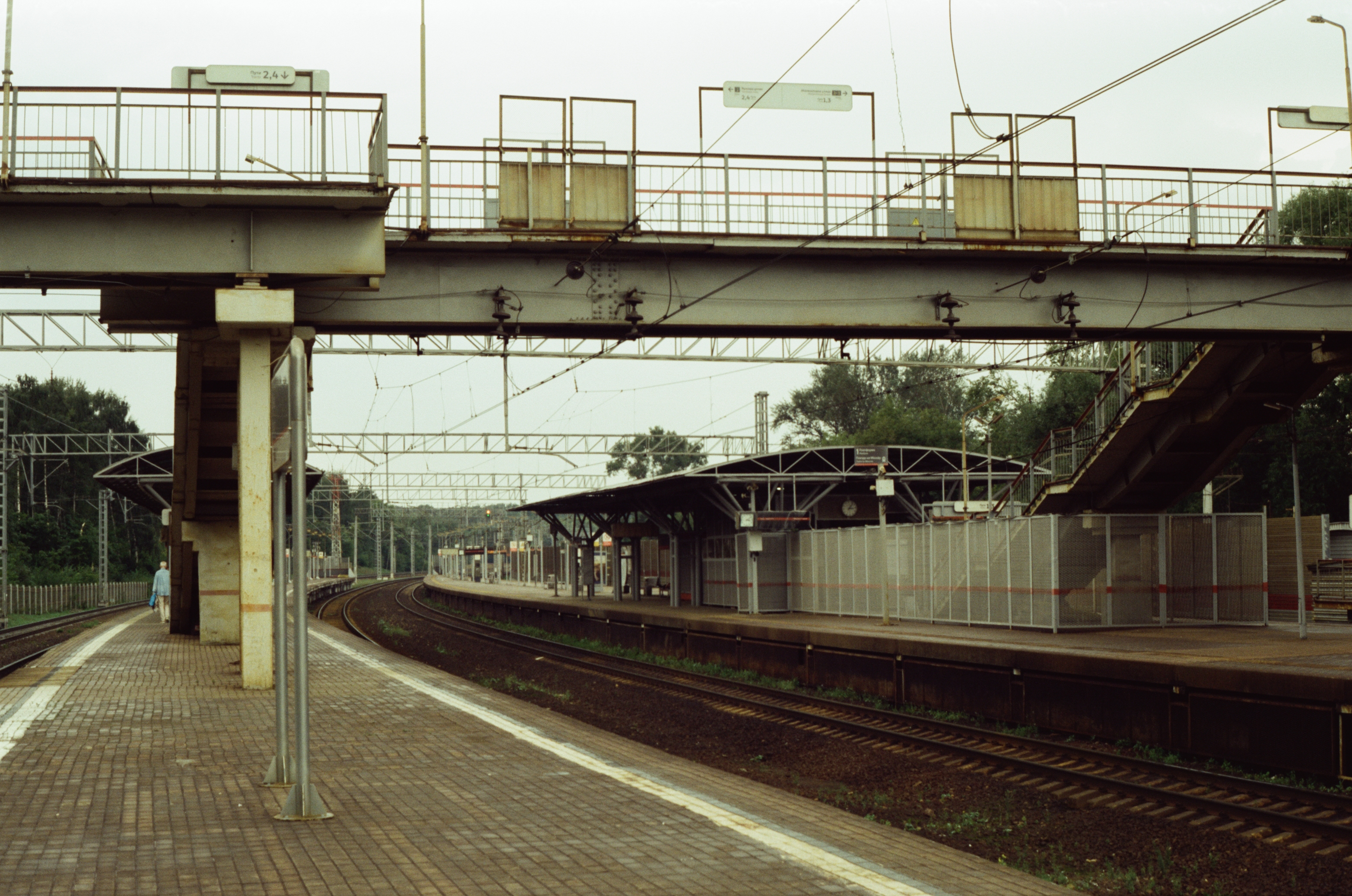
Southbound view (2021)

Yauza is a Moscow Railway station on the Yaroslavsky suburban railway line in Moscow, Russia. It is located on the border of Eastern and North-Eastern Administrative Okrugs, 6.2 kilometres (3.9 mi) from Yaroslavsky railway terminal.

There are exits at Malakhitovaya Street and Yauzskaya Alley.
