= Strunino =

Strunino (Russian: Струнино) is the name of several inhabited localities in Russia.

Urban localities

- Strunino, Vladimir Oblast, a town in Alexandrovsky District of Vladimir Oblast

Rural localities

- Strunino, Leningrad Oblast, a village in Tsvylevskoye Settlement Municipal Formation of Tikhvinsky District in Leningrad Oblast
- Strunino, Tula Oblast, a village in Revyakinskaya Rural Territory of Yasnogorsky District in Tula Oblast
