= Moscow Yaroslavsky railway station =

Railway station in Moscow, Russia

Moscow–Yaroslavsky Москва–Ярославская
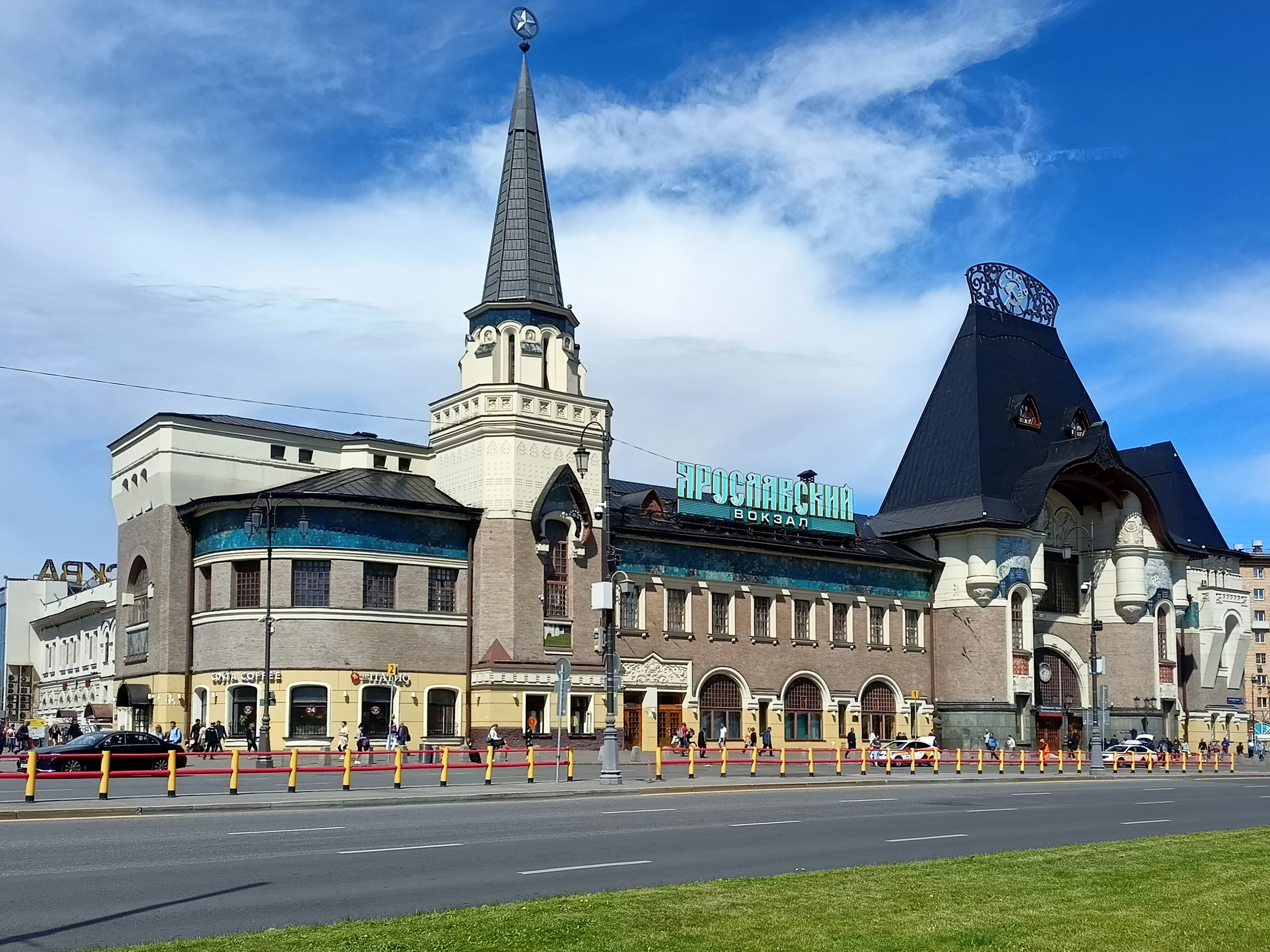
- Yaroslavsky station in 2022

General information
- Location: 5 Komsomolskaya Square, Moscow; Russia
- Coordinates: 55.776°N 37.658°E
- Owner: Russian Railways
- Operator: Moscow Railway
- Platforms: 11
- Tracks: 16
- Train operators: Russian Railways; China Railway; Ulaanbataar Railway Bureau
- Connections: Moscow Metro: Tram: 7, 13, 37, 50 Bus: 40, 122, А Trolleybus: 14, 41;

Construction
- Parking: Yes
- Cycle facilities: Yes
- Accessible: Yes
- Architectural style: Russian Revival

Other information
- Station code: 195506
- Fare zone: 0

History
- Opened: 18 August 1862
- Rebuilt: 1904–1910, 1965–1966, 1995

Services
Preceding station	Russian Railways	Following station
Terminus	Moscow–Vladivostok	Khotkovo towards Vladivostok
Terminus	Yaroslavsky Suburban	Moskva-3 towards Balakirevo
Location
- Location within Moscow Ring Road

Moscow Yaroslavsky railway station (Russian: Ярославский вокзал, romanized: Yaroslavsky vokzal) is one of the nine main railway stations in Moscow. Situated on Komsomolskaya Square (close to the Kazansky and Leningradsky Stations), Moscow Yaroslavskaya has the highest passenger throughput of all nine of the capital's main-line terminuses. It serves eastern destinations, including those in the Russian Far East, being the western terminus of the world's longest railway line, the Trans-Siberian. The station takes its name from that of the ancient city of Yaroslavl which, lying 284 rail kilometres (176 miles) north-east of Moscow, is the first large city served by the line.

== History ==
The first Yaroslavsky station was built on this site in 1862, next to Moscow's first rail terminal, the Oktyabrsky (now Leningradsky) station.

The existing Neorussian revival building facing Komsomolskaya Square was built in 1902–1904 by Fyodor Shechtel. The main departure hall beneath the fairy-tale roof connected directly into the boarding concourse. In 1910, its platforms and concourse were expanded by Lev Kekushev. Two major additions, in 1965–66 and 1995, further expanded station capacity. Currently, the station serves around 300 pairs of trains daily.

== Trains and destinations ==
=== Long-distance from Moscow ===
Yaroslavsky is served by all trains to the Russian Far East. The only international railway lines are Pyongyang (rare) and Beijing (owned by Chinese Railways and Russia Railways).

Train number	Train name	Destination	Operated by
001/002	Rossiya; Россия	(Russia) Vladivostok (»: (Russia) Kansk, (North Korea) Pyongyang, (North Korea) Tumangang)	(Russia) Russian Railways
003/004	—	(China) Beijing	(China) Chinese Railways
005/006	—	(Mongolia) Ulaanbaatar (Central) (»: (Mongolia) Erdenet)	(Mongolia) Mongolian Railways,
—	—	(North Korea) Pyongyang	(North Korea) Korean State Railway (Russia) Russian Railways
007/008	Kama; Кама	(Russia) Perm	(Russia) Russian Railways
011/012	Yamal; Ямал	(Russia) Novy Urengoy	(Russia) Russian Railways
019/020	Vostok; Восток	(China) Beijing	(Russia) Russian Railways
021/022	Polyarnaya Strela; Полярная Стрела	(Russia) Labytnangi	(Russia) Russian Railways
029/030	Kuzbass; Кузбасс	(Russia) Kemerovo	(Russia) Russian Railways
031/032	Vyatka; Вятка	(Russia) Kirov	(Russia) Russian Railways
033/034	Syktyvkar; Сыктывкар	(Russia) Syktyvkar	(Russia) Russian Railways
035/036	Nizhegorodets; Нижегородец	(Russia) Nizhny Novgorod	(Russia) Russian Railways
037/038	Tomich; Томич	(Russia) Tomsk	(Russia) Russian Railways
041/042	Vorkuta; Воркута	(Russia) Vorkuta (»: (Russia) Usinsk)	(Russia) Russian Railways
049/050	Malakhit; Малахит	(Russia) Yekaterinburg	(Russia) Russian Railways
055/056	Yenisey; Енисей	(Russia) Krasnoyarsk	(Russia) Russian Railways
067/068	Sayany; Саяны	(Russia) Abakan	(Russia) Russian Railways
069/070	—	(Russia) Chita 2	(Russia) Russian Railways
083/084	Severny Ural; Северный Урал	(Russia) Priobye	(Russia) Russian Railways
099/100		(Russia) Vladivostok via original route	(Russia) Russian Railways
101/102 103/104 105/106	Moscow-Yaroslavl Москва-Ярославль	(Russia) Yaroslavl	(Russia) Russian Railways
115/116/117/118	Pomore; Поморье	(Russia) Arkhangelsk (Russia) Severodvinsk	(Russia) Russian Railways
125/126	Sheksna; Шексна	(Russia) Cherepovets	(Russia) Russian Railways
147/148	Kostroma; Кострома	(Russia) Kostroma	(Russia) Russian Railways
973/974		(Russia) Vladivostok via new route	(Russia) Russian Railways

» : through coach(es)

=== Other destinations ===
Country	Destinations
Russia	Blagoveshchensk, Chita, Irkutsk, Ivanovo, Kineshma, Kotlas, Naushki, Novosibirsk, Severobaykalsk, Tavda, Usinsk, Vologda

=== Suburban destinations ===
Suburban commuter trains (elektrichka) connect Yaroslavsky Rail station stations and platforms of the Yaroslavsky suburban railway line, in particular, with the towns of Mytishchi, Korolyov, Shchyolkovo, Monino, Ivanteyevka, Fryazino, Pushkino, Krasnoarmeysk, Khotkovo, Sergiyev Posad, and Alexandrov.

== Gallery ==
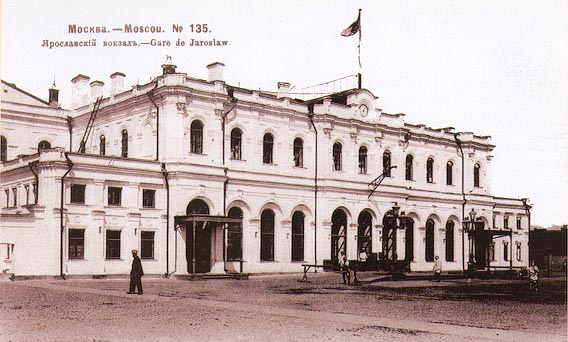
Historical view of the station (before 1902)

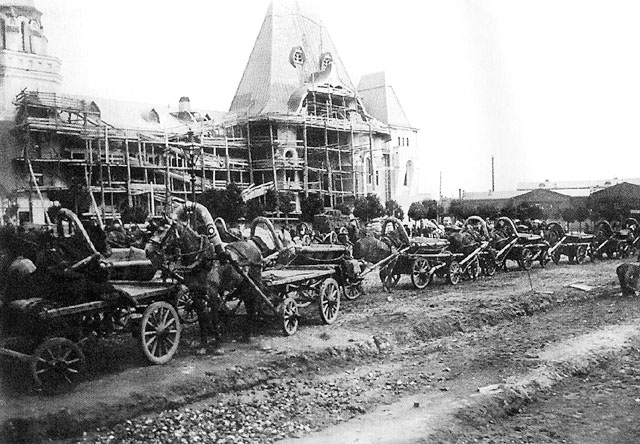
Construction of the new building (1903–1904)

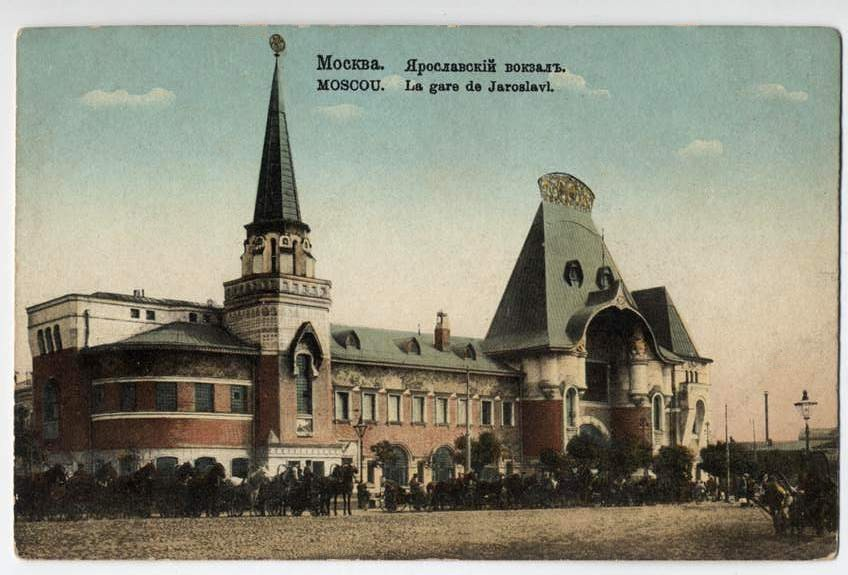
Historical view of the station (early 20th century)

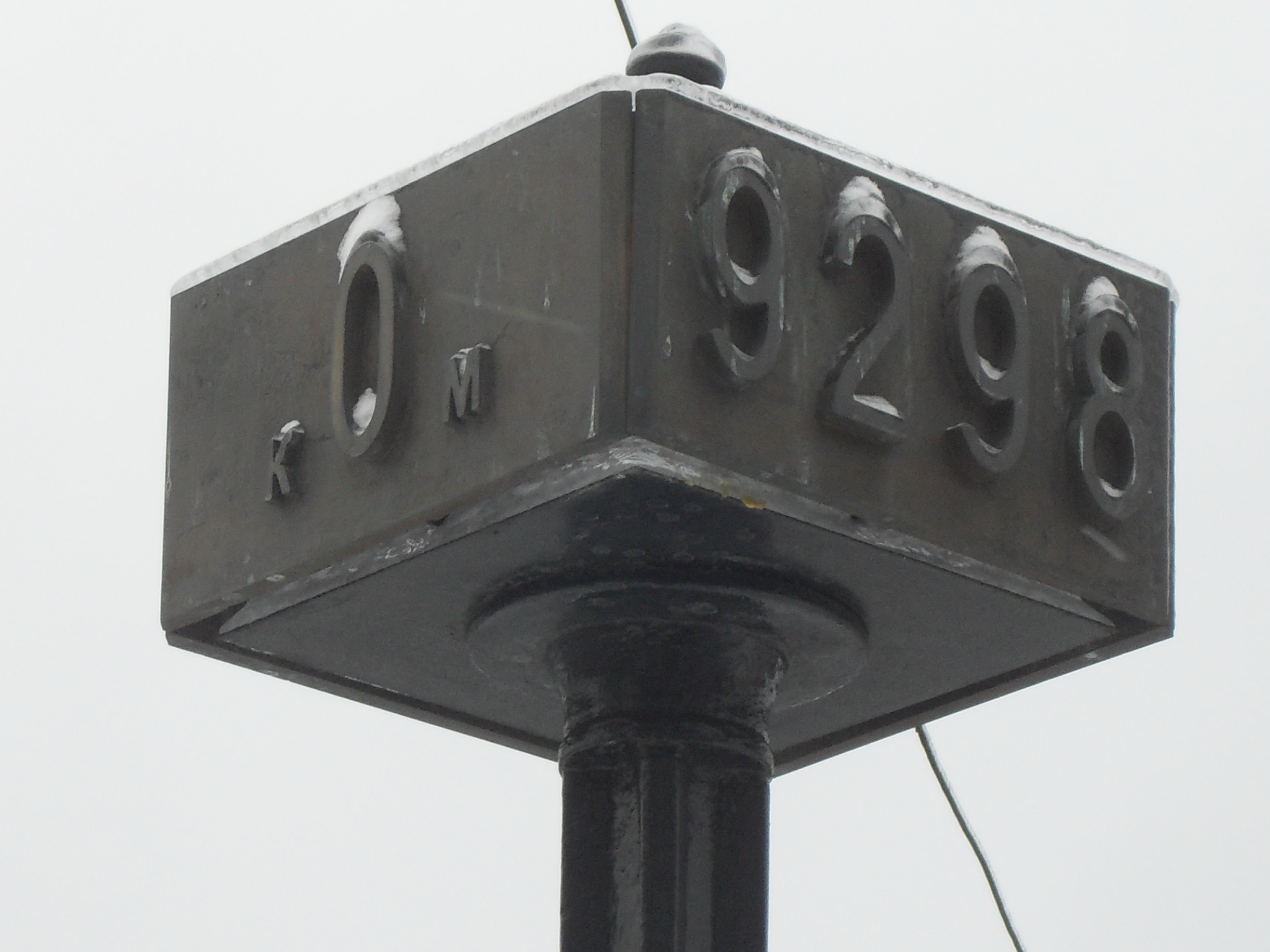
The "Zero Kilometer" kilometer marker at Yaroslavsky Station in Moscow indicates the length of the Trans-Siberian Railway—the distance from Moscow to Vladivostok.
