= Oates =

Oates may refer to:

== People ==
- Oates (surname)
- Kate Micucci, half of the musical comedy duo Garfunkel and Oates

== Places ==
- Oates, Missouri, an unincorporated community in the United States
- Mount Oates, on the border between Alberta and British Columbia, Canada
- Mount Oates (New Zealand), Southern Alps of New Zealand
- Oates Land, a region of Antarctica
  - Oates Bank, a submarine bank off the coast of Oates Land
  - Oates Coast, the coast of Oates Land
- Oates Canyon, an undersea canyon in the Ross Sea off Antarctica

== Other uses ==
- Oates Building, a historic building in Florida, United States

== See also ==
- Oates's soft coral crab, the only species in the genus Hoplophrys
- Oats (disambiguation)
