= Oates (surname) =

Oates is a surname. Notable people with the surname include:

- Adam Oates (born 1962), Canadian professional ice hockey player
- Alice Oates (1849–1887), actress and musical theatre pioneer
- Colin Oates (born 1983), English judoka
- Corey Oates (born 1994), Australian rugby league player
- Cynthia de la Vega Oates (born 1991), Mexican model
- Dan Oates (born 1955), American police chief
- Delores Riley Oates, American politician
- Denese Oates (born 1955), Australian artist
- Eugene William Oates (1845–1911), English naturalist
- Frank Oates (1840–1875), British African explorer
- Graham Oates (footballer, born 1943), English footballer
- Graham Oates (footballer, born 1949), English footballer
- Jackie Oates (born 1983), English folk musician
- John Oates (disambiguation)
- Joyce Carol Oates (born 1938), American writer
- Lawrence Oates (1880–1912), British Antarctic explorer
- Liz Oates, American politician
- Lynette Frances Oates (1921–2013), Australian linguist
- Mary Oates Spratt Van Landingham (1852–1937), American historian
- Nadia Georgina Oates (born 1990), English singer
- Rhys Oates (born 1994), English footballer
- Sheila Oates (born 1939), British and Australian mathematician
- Simon Oates (1932–2009), British actor
- Stephen B. Oates (1936–2021), American author and biographer
- Thomas Oates (disambiguation)
- Titus Oates (1649–1705), 17th-century perjurer
- Travis Oates, American voice actor
- Wallace Eugene Oates (1937–2015), American economist
- Warren Oates (1928–1982), American character actor
- William Oates (disambiguation)

== See also ==
- Oates (disambiguation)
