= Oat (disambiguation) =

Oat (plural: oats) is a cereal grain crop.

Oat or Oats may also refer to:

== Botany ==
- Avena, the broader genus of oats
- Uniola paniculata, known as sea oats

== People with the name ==
- Carleton Oats (born 1942), American football player
- Francis Oats (born 1848 – died 1918), was a Cornish miner who became chairman of De Beers diamond company.
- Nate Oats (born 1974), American basketball coach

== Fictional characters ==
- Col. Oats, a character in the 1991 American science fiction comedy film Bill & Ted's Bogus Journey
- Mightily Oats, a character in the Terry Pratchett novel Carpe Jugulum

== Other uses ==
- OATS, Open Source Assistive Technology Software, a source code repository
- Oats (horse), a racehorse
- Obligation assimilable du Trésor, a French government bond
- Occupied Arab Territories, a designation used by the United Nations that refers to territories that are occupied by Israel after the Six-Day War
- Ohio Achievement Test, now the Ohio Achievement Assessment
- Operational acceptance testing
- Optometry Admission Test, the widely used test for admission to a school of optometry
- Ornithine aminotransferase, an enzyme
- Outside air temperature
- Overseas Adventure Travel, an American travel agency
- Oxford Aviation Training, now Oxford Aviation Academy
- Oxygen atom transfer in redox reactions
- Organic acid technology in antifreeze
- Oats Studios, a science-fiction film studio started by Neill Blomkamp
- Scarborough Open Air Theatre, commonly abbreviated to OAT
- Old Anatolian Turkish, an extinct Turkic language

== See also ==
- Captain Oats (disambiguation)
- Oates (disambiguation)
- Omicron Alpha Tau
- Oat Hills (disambiguation)
- Oat Mountain
- Oatmeal (disambiguation)
