= Mikhail Babushkin =

Soviet polar aviator

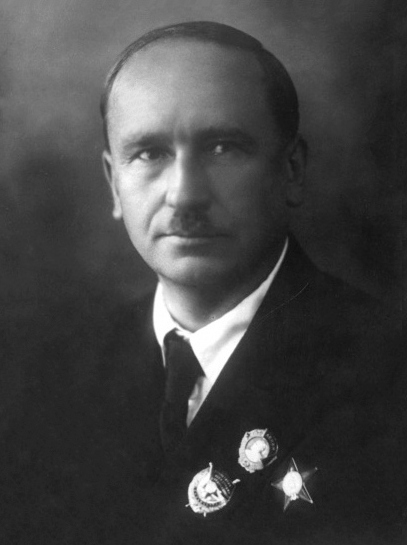
- Born: 6 October 1893; Village of Bordino, Russian Empire (today Moscow, Russia; merged into the city)
- Died: 18 May 1938 (aged 44)
- Military career
- Allegiance: Soviet Union
- Awards: Hero of the Soviet Union

Mikhail Babushkin (Russian: Михаи́л Серге́евич Ба́бушкин; October 6, 1893 – May 18, 1938) was a Soviet polar aviator and a Hero of the Soviet Union (June 27, 1937). Together with Mikhail Vodopyanov, he was the first to land an airplane on the North Pole.

== Biography ==
Mikhail Babushkin was born in a village of Bordino (which was merged into the city of Moscow in 1960), started military service in 1914, graduated from Gatchina aviation school (one of the first Russian aviation schools) in 1915. Since 1923 he served in the Arctic aviation. He took part in an expedition to rescue Umberto Nobile in 1928, and in the Chelyuskin expedition in 1933. He took part in the flights to the Soviet drifting ice station "North Pole-1" in 1937. Between 1937 and 1938, Mikhail Babushkin participated in a search for Sigizmund Levanevsky. He died in 1938 in a flight accident and was interred at the Novodevichy Cemetery.

Mikhail Babushkin was also a recipient of the Order of Lenin.

== Commemoration ==
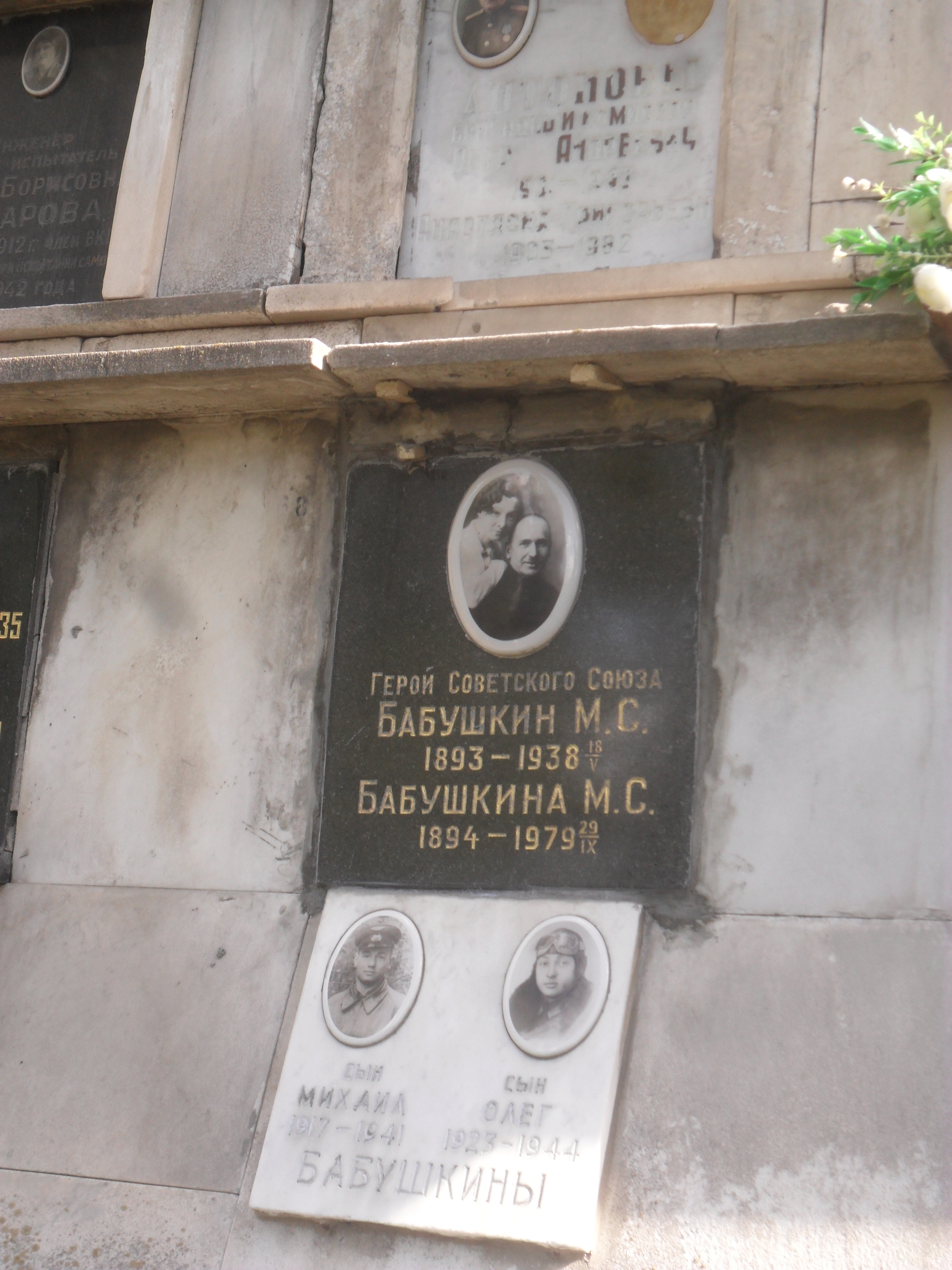
Columbarium plaque of Hero of the Soviet Union Mikhail Babushkin at Novodevichy Cemetery in Moscow.

Named in Babushkin’s honor:

An island in the Novaya Zemlya archipelago, surveyed in 1930 by a comprehensive marine expedition aboard the icebreaking steamer G. Sedov; the island was named at that time;

An island near the Oates Coast in East Antarctica, at 69°04′ S, 157°25′ E; the island was discovered and mapped in 1958 by the Soviet Antarctic Expedition and named at that time;

A cape and a mountain on the Pyagin Peninsula in Magadan Oblast;

A cape on Alexandra Land Island in the Franz Josef Land archipelago;

The town near Moscow where the hero was born and raised; today it is part of Moscow as Babushkinsky District;

Lyotchika Babushkina Street in the North-Eastern Administrative Okrug of Moscow;

Babushkinskaya station of the Moscow Metro;

Streets in the cities of Arkhangelsk, Ufa, Ulan-Ude, Krasnodar, Syktyvkar, Artyom in Primorsky Krai, Yekaterinburg, Irkutsk, Lipetsk, Chelyabinsk, Rybinsk, and Noginsk;

Lanes in the Zheleznodorozhny District of Rostov-on-Don, in the town of Nyandoma in Arkhangelsk Oblast, and in the city of Tyumen;

Streets in the cities of Melitopol and Mariupol.
