= Sviblovo =

Sviblovo may refer to:

- Sviblovo District, a district in North-Eastern Administrative Okrug of the federal city of Moscow, Russia
- Sviblovo (Moscow Metro), a station of the Moscow Metro, Moscow, Russia
