= Babushkinskaya =

Moscow Metro station

Babushkinskaya Бабушкинская
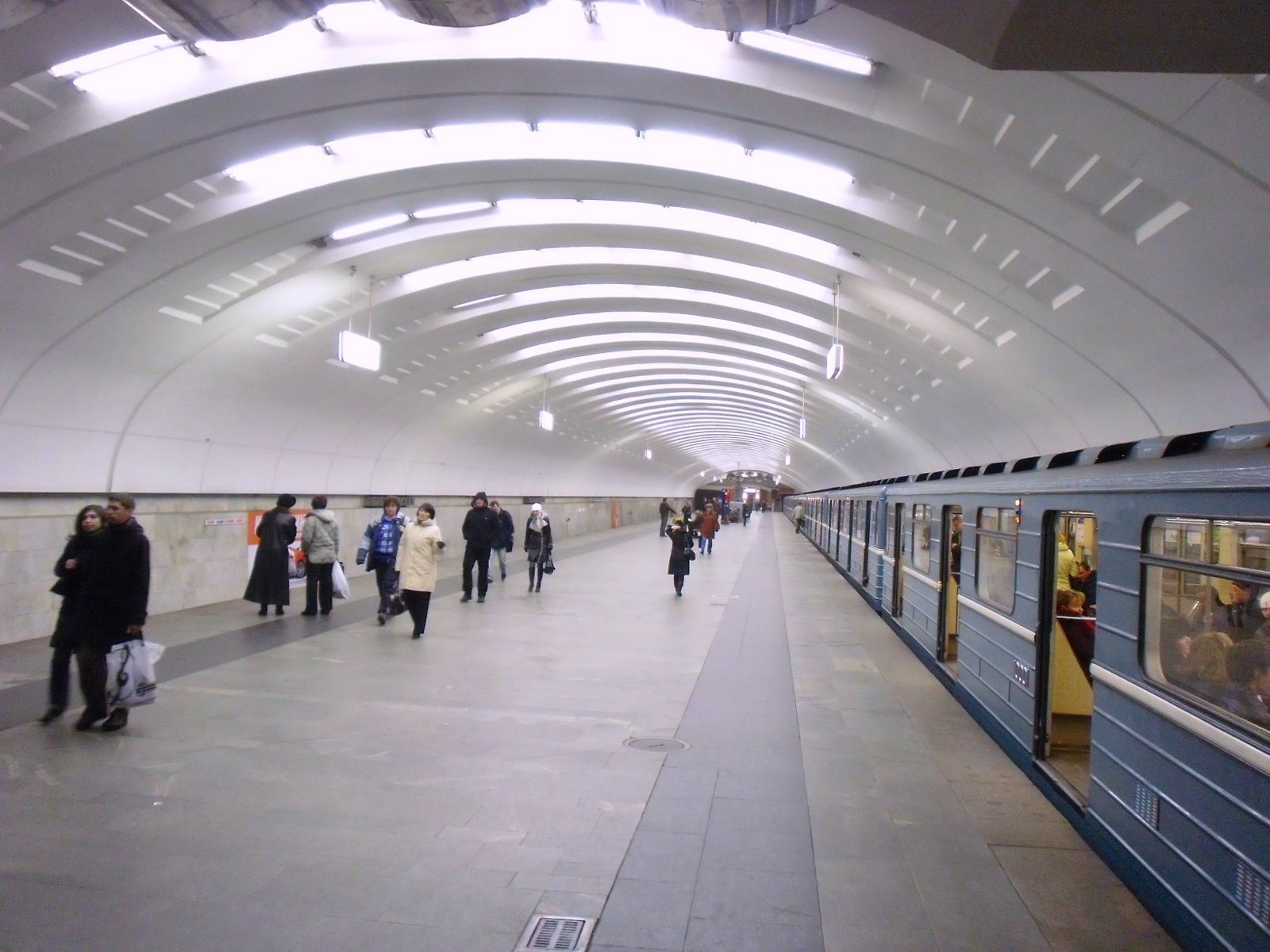

General information
- Location: Babushkinsky District; North-Eastern Administrative Okrug; Moscow; Russia
- Coordinates: 55.8694°N 37.6644°E
- System: Moscow Metro station
- Owner: Moskovsky Metropoliten
- Line: Kaluzhsko-Rizhskaya line
- Platforms: 1 island platform
- Tracks: 2

Construction
- Structure type: Shallow single-vault
- Depth: 10 metres (33 ft)
- Platform levels: 1
- Parking: No

Other information
- Station code: 087

History
- Opened: 29 September 1978; 47 years ago

Passengers
- 2009: 26,963,645

Services
Preceding station	Moscow Metro	Following station
Sviblovo towards Novoyasenevskaya	Kaluzhsko-Rizhskaya line	Medvedkovo Terminus
Route map
Location
- Location within Moscow Metro

Babushkinskaya (Russian: Бабушкинская) is a Moscow Metro station in the Babushkinsky District, North-Eastern Administrative Okrug, Moscow. It was opened on September 29, 1978 as a part of the VDNKh – Medvedkovo sector. It is on the Kaluzhsko-Rizhskaya Line, between Sviblovo and Medvedkovo stations after the commissioning of which there were 107 stations in the Moscow Metro.

== Name ==
Babsuhkinskaya was named after Babushkinsky District where the station is located, which in turn was named after Mikhail Babushkin, a polar aviator.

On March 29, 2020 due to the coronavirus pandemic in Russia, the management of the Moscow Metro temporarily renamed the station to "DomaBabushkinskaya" (Russian: Домабабушкинская), meaning "Grandmother at home", to remind the citizens of Moscow to keep their elderly parents at home.

== Design ==
Babushkinskaya is a single vault-type station, elliptical in cross-section with slightly canted, grey marble side walls. All of the signs and light fixtures are attached to the ceiling, so the platform is completely open except for a few minimalist benches located along the central axis. At the end of the platform, above the exit stairs, is a sculpture by A. M. Mosichuk commemorating Babushkin's Arctic flight.

== Entrances ==
The entrances to the station are located at the intersection of Yeniseyskaya and Menzhinskogo Streets.
