= Oates Bank =

- Submerged bank Oates Bank (Antarctica)
- Interactive map of Oates Bank
- Ocean: Southern Ocean

Oates Bank (70°15′S 165°0′E) is a submarine bank off the coast of Oates Land. The name, in association with Oates Coast, was proposed by Dr. Steven C. Cande, Scripps Institution of Oceanography. Name approved 9/97 (ACUF 272).

== See also ==
- Somov Sea
