= Harry Pennell =

Royal Navy officer (1882–1916)

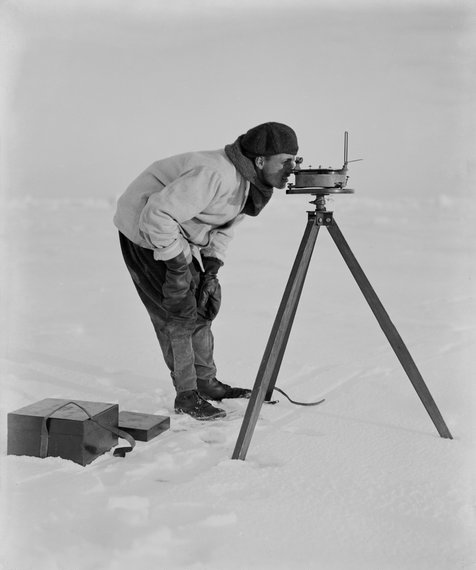
Lieutenant Pennell with a prismatic compass

Commander Harry Lewin Lee Pennell (1882 – 31 May 1916) was a Royal Navy officer who served on the Terra Nova Expedition. He was responsible for the first sighting of Oates Coast on 22 February 1911, and named it after Captain Lawrence Oates. He only spent short periods in Antarctica, returning with the Terra Nova to wait out the winters of 1911 and 1912 in Lyttelton, New Zealand. Due to the absence of Robert Falcon Scott on land, Pennell assumed the role of command on the Terra Nova, which would bring fresh supplies back to Antarctica with each voyage.

Despite not being a part of the main landing party for the Pole, Pennell was a popular member of the expedition. Herbert Ponting, the photographer of the expedition, recalled in his book The Great White South that Pennell was "the most energetic man I have ever known....when Pennell was not occupied with navigating problems, he was either on watch, or conning from the crow's-nest, or else out on the yard-arms helping the seaman set or shorten sail, or otherwise assisting in the handling of the ship. He was a 'whale for work' ".

== Character and personal life ==
'Pennell is the navigator, and the standard compass, owing to its remoteness from iron in this position, is placed on the top of the ice-house. The steersman, however, steers by a binnacle compass placed aft in front of his wheel. But these two compasses for various reasons do not read alike at a given moment, while the standard is the truer of the two.

'At intervals, then, Pennell or the officer of the watch orders the steersman to "Stand by for a steady," and goes up to the standard compass, and watches the needle. Suppose the course laid down is S. 40 E. A liner would steer almost true to this course unless there was a big wind or sea. But not so the old Terra Nova. Even with a good steersman the needle swings a good many degrees either side of the S. 40 E. But as it steadies momentarily on the exact course Pennell shouts his "Steady," the steersman reads just where the needle is pointing on the compass card before him, say S. 47 E., and knows that this is the course which is to be steered by the binnacle compass.

'Pennell's yells were so frequent and ear-piercing that he became famous for them, and many times in working on the ropes in rough seas and big winds, we have been cheered by this unmusical noise over our heads.'

Excerpt from The Worst Journey in the World by Apsley Cherry-Garrard.

Pennell married Katie Hodson, the sister of his friend from naval college, on 15 April 1915 during his shore leave. Pennell was promoted to Commander and assigned to HMS Queen Mary, dying in her on 31 May 1916 in the Battle of Jutland, when the ship was sunk by the German ships SMS Seydlitz and SMS Derfflinger.

== Legacy ==
The Pennell Coast of Victoria Land, Antarctica, is named after him.

Pennell was portrayed by Bruce Seton in the 1948 film Scott of the Antarctic, and by Peter Sands in the 1985 television serial The Last Place on Earth.
