= John Charles Dollman =

British artist (1851–1934)

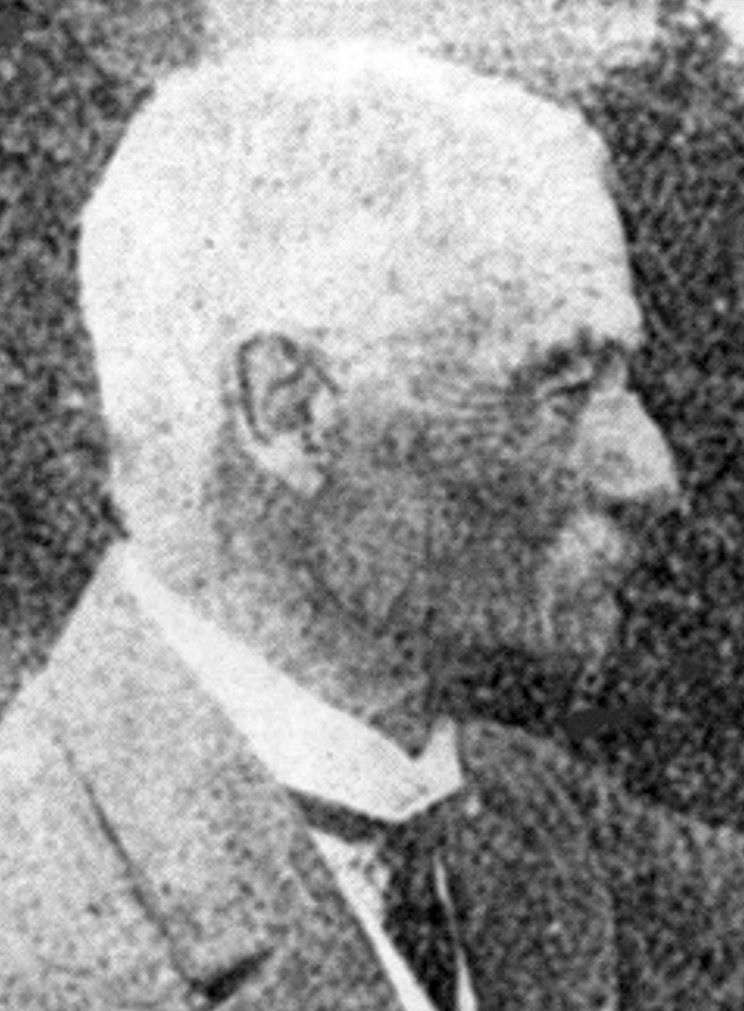
John Charles Dollman

John Charles Dollman RWS RI ROI (6 May 1851 – 11 December 1934) was an English painter and illustrator.

== Life ==
Dollman was born in Hove on 6 May 1851 and moved to London to study at South Kensington and the Royal Academy Schools, after which he set up a studio at Bedford Park, London, designed for him by Maurice Bingham Adams. He exhibited at the Royal Academy from 1870 to 1912, and was elected RWS (Member of the Royal Watercolour Society) in 1913. Dollman was also an illustrator, working in black and white or colour for magazines such as The Graphic during and after the 1880s. Some of his early work has been said to have influenced Van Gogh.

== Works ==
A central theme was ambitious mythological pictures such as a Viking Foray, a Viking horde entitled the Ravager, The Unknown (1912), featuring a girl surrounded by chimps and Orpheus and his Lute with Lions. He also produced bold compositions of animals and people such as Robinson Crusoe and His Man Friday, Polo and Mowgli made leader of the Bandar-log (1903). His best known work is possibly A London Cab Stand (1888), focussing on a group of horses in a stormy scene. He composed at least three variants of this picture, and there are other instances where he made copies or near-copies of individual pictures. In the 1890s he painted pictures of soldiers, and some less well regarded genre pictures of people with animals. He also painted wild animal pictures without attempting any narrative content.

Dollman's works are in the collections of various galleries. The Immigrants' Ship (1884) is in the Art Gallery of South Australia, Adelaide. 'The Ravager' is owned by the Trustees of the Royal Watercolour Society, London. A version of The Unknown is in the Laing Art Gallery, Newcastle. A London Cab Stand is in the Museum of London. A Dog's Home, Table d'Hote (1879) is in the Walker Art Gallery, Liverpool, and During the Time of the Sermonses (1896), an odd picture of a pair of religious people approaching two golfers, is in the collection of the Harris Museum, Preston, while 'Famine' (1904) is at the Salford Museum and Art Gallery. Ride of the Valkyries is located in the Art Gallery of Western Australia, Perth.

His painting of Antarctic explorer Lawrence Oates as he walked to his death, A Very Gallant Gentleman, hangs in the Cavalry Club in London. It was commissioned by officers of the Inniskilling Dragoons in 1913. It was exhibited at the Royal Academy in 1914. A preparatory sketch was exhibited in the Scott Polar Research Institute, at the University of Cambridge, and later sold by Christie's, on behalf of a private owner, for £40,000 in 2014.

Dollman died in London on 11 December 1934, aged 83. He was the father of the noted zoologist and taxonomist Guy Dollman.

== Gallery ==
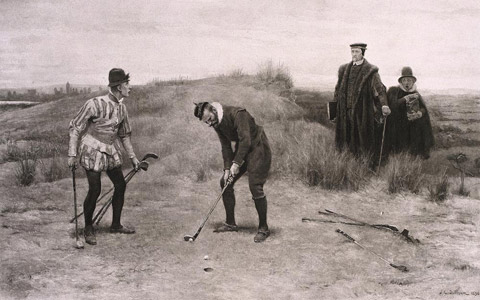
The Sabbath Breakers (1896)

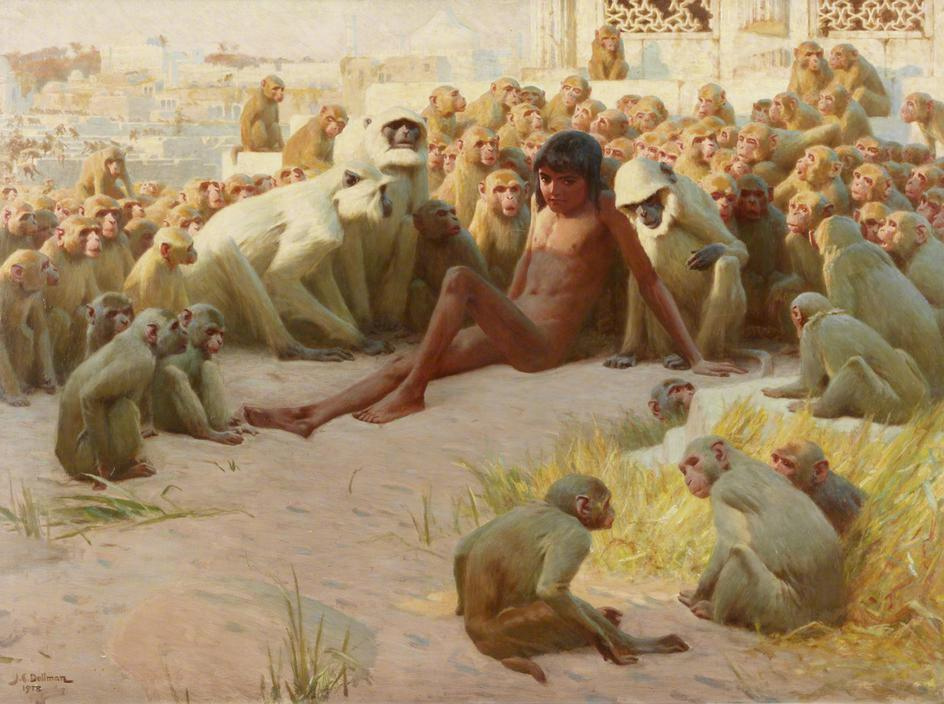
Mowgli made leader of the Bandar Log (1903)

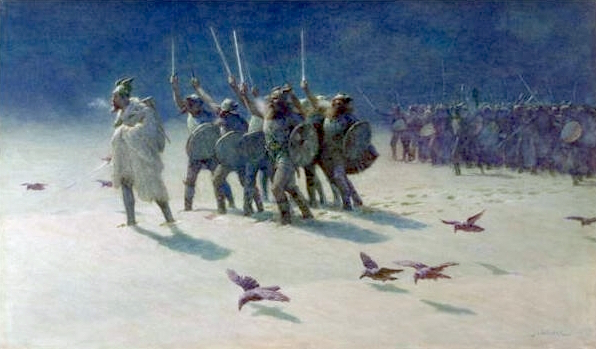
The Ravager (1909)

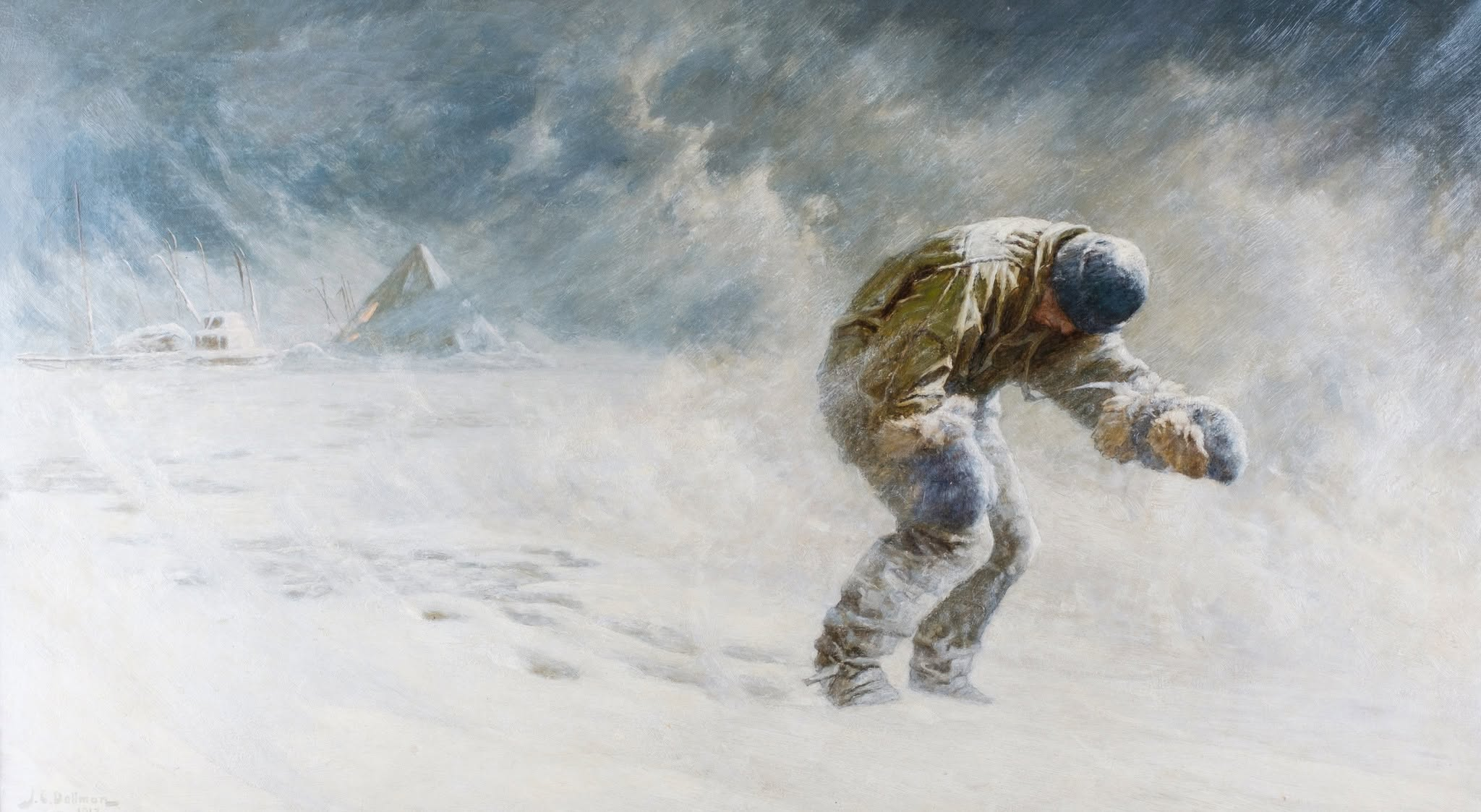
A Very Gallant Gentleman (1913)
