= Babushkinsky District, Moscow =

Babushkinsky District, Moscow Бабушкинский район (Russian)
- District
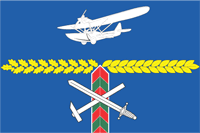
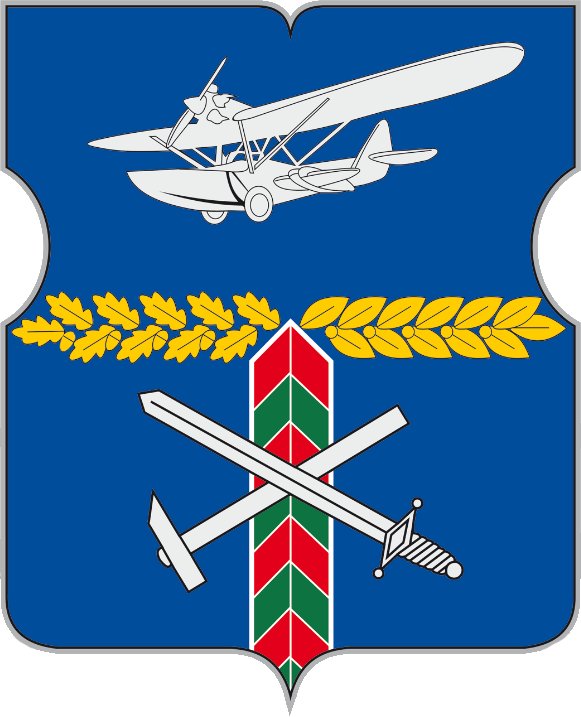
- Flag Coat of arms
- Location of Babushkinsky District, Moscow on the map of Moscow
- Coordinates: 55°52′11″N 37°39′52″E
- Country: Russia
- Federal subject: Moscow
- Time zone: UTC+
- OKTMO ID: 45351000
- Website: http://babushkinsky.mos.ru/

Babushkinsky District, Moscow (Russian: Ба́бушкинский райо́н) is an administrative district (raion) situated within the North-Eastern Administrative Okrug, and one of the 125 raions of Moscow, Russia. The area of the district is 5.07 square kilometers (1.96 sq mi).

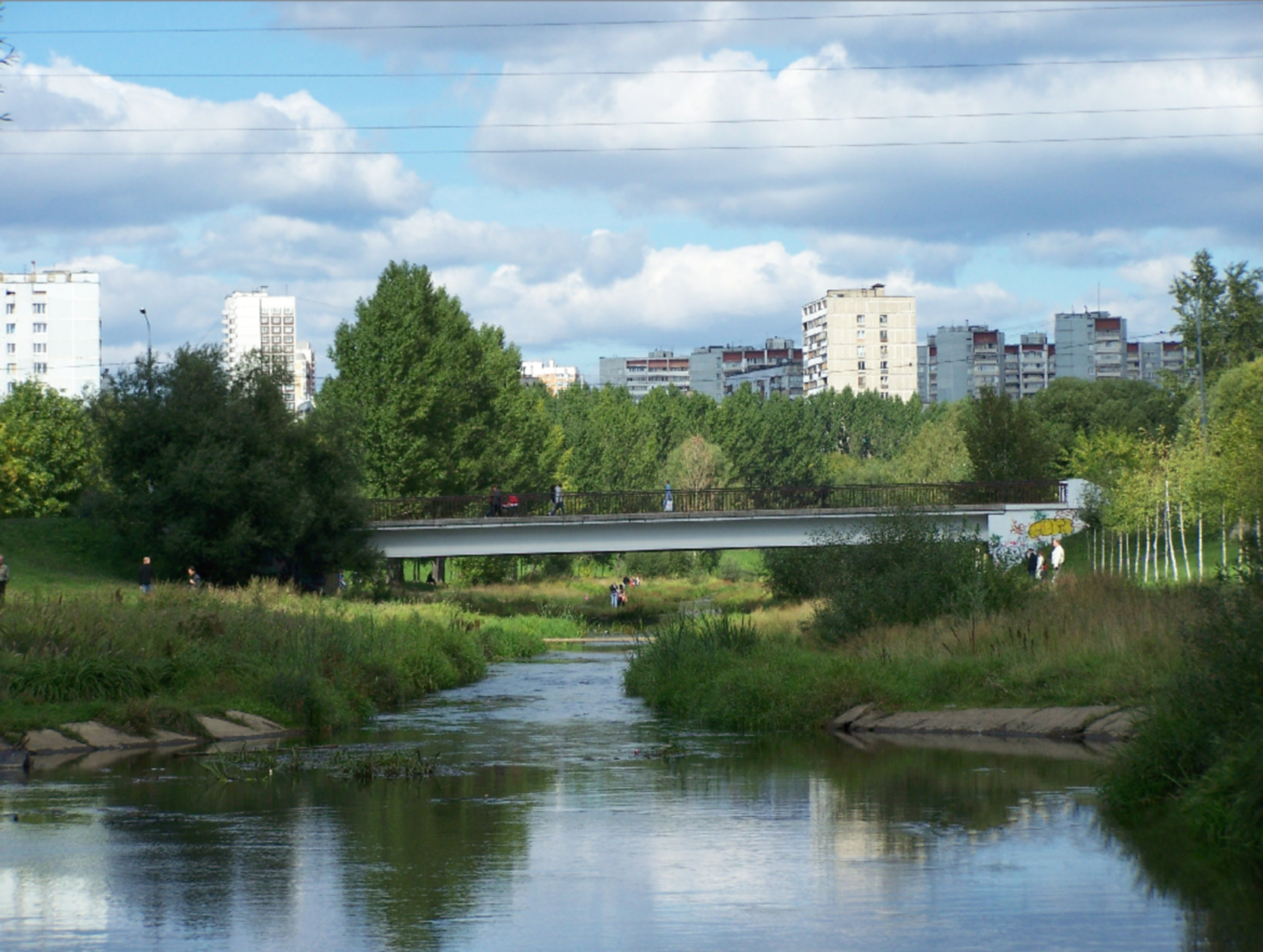
The 1st Medvedkovski Bridge

It is named after the famous pilot and polar explorer Mikhail Babushkin, who was born in this area. Prior to renaming in 1939, the region was known as Bordino. In 1960 it was incorporated into Moscow and became an urbanized area. Many streets and landmarks in Babushkinsky, as well as the neighboring districts of Losinoostrovsky and Yaroslavsky are named in honor of various polar explorers.

== History ==
In the 19th century, the area around what is now Chicherin Street was home to the village of Filino. Between 1900 and 1910, the land near Filino belonged to the Richter family. The father of the aviator Babushkin worked as a plumber and locksmith on the Richter estate, while the future pilot himself maintained the Richters' car. It was here, in the vicinity of Filino, that Babushkin developed his interest in technology. The Richters established a park on the banks of the Yauza River, which became known as the Richter Estate Park. In the 1913 directory Losinoostrovskaya and Its Environs, the names of the Richters and Filino are listed as one of the localities near Losinoostrovskaya Station. The area east of Filino was developed with dachas of the future Losinoostrovsk in the 1910s–1920s, while the village itself disappeared during the same period. In the Soviet era, a school was built directly on the site of Filino. By the time Babushkin was incorporated into Moscow, the former Filino area had become the western part of the city, known as the "Field Settlement of Metro Builders" or simply "Polevoy Gorodok." This settlement was separated from the overgrown and abandoned Richter Estate Park by a service railway line built in the 1930s.

In 1925, the settlement of Losinoostrovskaya became the town of Losinoostrovsk, which was renamed Babushkin in 1939 in honor of the polar aviator M.S. Babushkin, who was born near the town.

The history of the town (not the district) of Babushkin is also linked to the name of Hero of the Soviet Union Zhenya Rudneva. One of the district's streets is named after her, and a monument to the brave pilot stands at the beginning of the street.

In 1960, during the construction of the Moscow Ring Road (MKAD), the town of Babushkin was incorporated into Moscow. The district underwent mass housing construction from approximately 1965 to 1990. The Babushkinsky District in its current boundaries has existed since August 1991, following the division of Moscow into administrative districts and the creation of smaller municipal units.

The modern Babushkinsky District is only part (the center) of the former Babushkinsky District, which existed prior to 1991 on the site of the town of Babushkin. Other parts of the historical Babushkinsky District are now separate districts: Yaroslavsky (east), Sviblovo (south), and Losinoostrovsky (north).

== Parks and squares ==
=== Square along Olonetsky Proezd ===
The park stretches along the Yauza River in the Babushkinsky, Severnoye Medvedkovo, and Yuzhnoye Medvedkovo districts. Its area within Babushkinsky District covers approximately 30 hectares, most of which is a forested area intersected by walking paths. The green zone features over a dozen playgrounds, a dog-walking area, and sports facilities, including outdoor fitness equipment, volleyball courts, and ping-pong tables. In the northeastern part of the park lies the "Yauza" sports and recreation complex, which includes a football stadium, tennis courts, and an indoor ice rink. The park connects to the rest of the green zone via a bridge over the Yauza River.

Near Menzhinskogo Street, the green zone features a decorative gazebo with a colonnade in the classical style.

=== Krasnaya Dorozhka Square ===
This 5.6-hectare square is located along Iskra Street. It derives its name from its central red-colored walking path. The square was renovated in 2016 and now includes four playgrounds for children of different ages, as well as flower beds along the paths. In 2019, to mark Victory Day, an "Alley of Glory" was created here, featuring ten memorial plaques honoring Heroes of the USSR and Russia who lived in Babushkinsky District, with their names and lifespans engraved on them. At the intersection of Iskra and Yeniseyskaya Streets stands the wooden Church of the Annunciation of the Blessed Virgin Mary in Rayevo, built in the style of traditional Russian wooden architecture. The current church was constructed in 1997 on the site of a pre-revolutionary church, whose history dates back to the 16th century.

=== Zodiak Signs Square ===
This 1-hectare square is located at the intersection of Novy Beringov Proezd and Yeniseyskaya Street. It was designed in 2007 with an astrological theme, featuring 12 sculptures representing the zodiac signs. The sculptures were created by artist Andrey Aseryants, who uses scrap metal (bolts, screws, gears, and other metal parts) sourced from landfills. The square is modeled after the Solar System, with circular paths resembling planetary orbits and a central resting area with benches. A sculpture of a telescope pointing skyward stands at the center. The square's fencing also reflects the astrological theme, with cast-iron grilles depicting traditional zodiac symbols and their names.

The square is scheduled for renovation in 2022, which will include new lighting, tree and shrub plantings, a sports area with exercise equipment, a streetball court, a multi-age playground, and a quiet relaxation zone.

=== Square on Verkhoyanskaya Street ===
In 2018, to mark the 50th anniversary of Babushkinsky District's incorporation into Moscow, a square was created on a vacant lot on Verkhoyanskaya Street. It features four rubber-surfaced playgrounds for children of different ages, one of which has a nautical theme. The square also includes a sports area with pull-up bars and exercise equipment, as well as a dog-walking area with training facilities. At the intersection of Verkhoyanskaya and Letchika Babushkina Streets, a flowerbed shaped like a peacock with a tail made of floral arrangements was installed. In 2018, the Verkhoyanskaya Street square project won the "Best Implementation of a Public Space Development Project" award among other improvement projects in the North-Eastern Administrative District.

=== Square at the Intersection of Letchika Babushkina and Komintern Streets ===
In 2004, a monument to aviator M.S. Babushkin, created by sculptor Vladimir Lepeshov, was installed in this square. The area features decorative arches, benches, and flower beds.

== See also ==
- Administrative divisions of Moscow
