= Gestingthorpe =

Village in Essex, England

Coordinates: 52.016°N 0.639°E

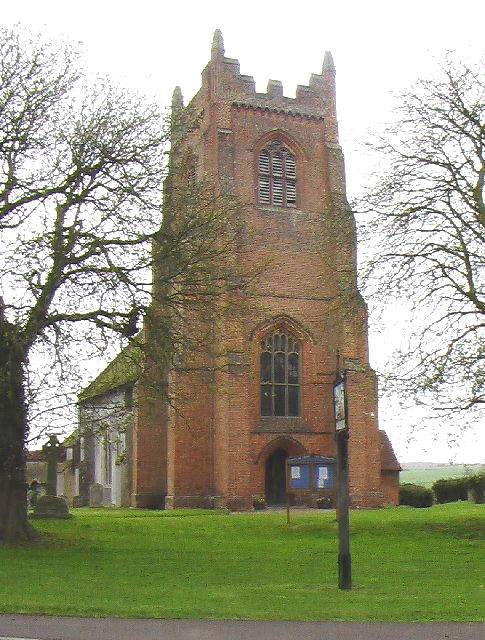
- St Mary's Church

- Location within Essex
- Population: 397 (Parish, 2021)
- Civil parish: Gestingthorpe
- District: Braintree
- Shire county: Essex
- Region: East
- Country: England
- Sovereign state: United Kingdom
- Post town: HALSTEAD
- Postcode district: CO9

Gestingthorpe (pronounced /ˈɡɛstɪŋθɔːrp/ GEST-ing-thorp, sometimes spelled 'guesstingthorpe') is a village and civil parish in the Braintree district of Essex, England. It is approximately halfway between the towns of Halstead in Essex and Sudbury in Suffolk. The village is situated at a set of crossroads: North End Road, Nether Hill, Sudbury Road, and Church Street. At the 2021 census the parish had a population of 397.

In the 19th century, the Manor of Over Hall in Gestingthorpe was the home of the Oates family, whose most famous son, the Antarctic explorer Captain Lawrence Oates, who died on the return journey from the South Pole in 1912. He was born in Putney, London, on 16 March 1880. The Oates were originally a West Riding of Yorkshire family until they succeeded to the manor. In 1913, his brother officers erected a memorial to Captain Oates in the parish church of St Mary the Virgin.

Just north of the village is Gestingthorpe Roman Villa, the site of a farmstead dating back to the Celtic and Roman periods. The site has produced many archaeological finds, including roof tiles, glass, and a small ring with an engraving of a lion attacking a deer. The property remains a working farm, but visitors are accepted by appointment.

The parish church of St Mary the Virgin is a Grade I listed building.

The church has a ring of 6 bells.

The nearest railway station is in Sudbury, which offers a shuttle service to Marks Tey and, at the extremes of the day, to Colchester.
