= Oates Land =

Segment of East Antarctica

Location of Oates Land (red), Australian Antarctic Territory in Antarctica

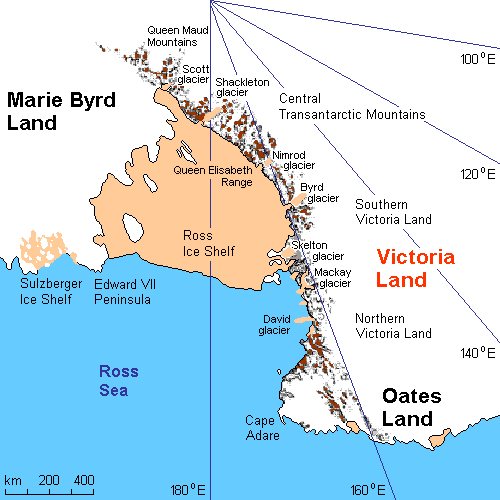
Area map of Oates Land

Oates Land is a region of Antarctica. It is variously defined as a portion of the East Antarctica near the coast stretching along and inland from the Oates Coast (see map) and as an officially delineated wedge-shaped segment of the Australian Antarctic Territory. The segment of the Australian claim extends between 153°45' E and 160° E, forming a wedge between Latitude 60° S and the South Pole. It is bounded in the east by the Ross Dependency and overlaps George V Land to the west.

== Exploration ==
Oates Land was discovered in February 1911 by Lieutenant Harry Pennell of the Royal Navy, commander of the Terra Nova, the expedition ship of the British Antarctic Expedition, 1910–13. It is named after Captain Lawrence Edward Grace "Titus" Oates of the 6th (Iniskilling) Dragoons, who, with Captain Robert Falcon Scott and three companions, lost his life on the return journey from the South Pole in 1912.

The coastal region of Oates Land has been photographed or explored by the United States Navy during Operation Highjump (1946–47), the Soviet Antarctic Expedition (1958), Australian National Antarctic Research Expeditions (1959, 1961 and 1962), the US Navy (1960–62), and the US Geological Survey (1963–64).

== Features ==
- Pedalling Ice Field
- Todd Gully
