= Captain Oats =

Captain Oats or Captain Oates may refer to:

- Lawrence Oates (1880 – 1912), an English cavalry officer with the 6th (Inniskilling) Dragoons, and later an Antarctic explorer
- William Oats (1841 – 1911), an Australian mining engineer and politician
- a toy horse belonging to the fictional character Seth Cohen
