= Oatmeal (disambiguation) =

Oatmeal is ground oat groats. It may also refer to:

- Porridge
- Oatmeal, Texas, an unincorporated community in Texas
- The Oatmeal, a website featuring comics
