= John Oates (disambiguation) =

John Oates (born 1948), is an American musician, best known as half of the rock and soul duo Hall & Oates.

John Oates may also refer to:

- John Oates (architect) (1793–1831), British architect
- Johnny Oates (1946–2004), American baseball manager

== See also ==
- John Oates Bower (1901–1981), Canadian politician
- Jonny Oates, Baron Oates (born 1969), English politician
