= Overseas Adventure Travel =

American tour operator

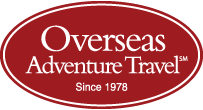
- Company type: Private
- Industry: Travel and tourism
- Founded: 1978
- Headquarters: Boston, MA, United States
- Key people: Alan and Harriet Lewis, owners
- Parent: Grand Circle Corporation
- Website: oattravel.com

Overseas Adventure Travel (O.A.T.) is part of the family of travel companies owned by Boston-based Grand Circle Corporation, offering group tourism to Africa, the Arctic, Asia, Central and South America, Europe, Australia and New Zealand. O.A.T. has small groups with a maximum of 16 travelers on land trips and 25 travelers on trips with a ship portion. O.A.T. has also been recognized for leadership in tourism and in philanthropy.

== History ==
In 1978, former high school teacher Judi Wineland established O.A.T. After she went to Africa, she became the first woman to launch and operate an adventure travel company. In 1993, O.A.T. was acquired by the Grand Circle Corporation, owned by Alan and Harriet Lewis. Grand Circle Corporation also includes Grand Circle Cruise Line and Grand Circle Travel.

== Awards ==
Travel + Leisure gave O.A.T. a Global Vision Award for philanthropy and a leadership award in 2013. Its readers also named O.A.T. as one of the world's best tour operators and safari outfitters. USA Today named O.A.T. among the top 10 best educational tour companies in its Readers’ Choice Awards in 2019.

== Cultural engagement ==
O.A.T. itineraries focus on "cultural immersion and spending time making connections to local people and their culture.” Their tour guides, called "Trip Experience Leaders", are English-speaking residents of the country.

== Solo travel ==
Forty-seven percent of O.A.T. travelers are solo travelers. There is a free single supplement on all O.A.T. land trips. Travel + Leisure named O.A.T. as one of the "Best Companies for Traveling Solo” and Travel Channel named O.A.T. the "Top Tour for Budget-Conscious Travelers.” In 2019, O.A.T. started to include women-only departures to meet the growing trend of solo female travelers.

== Philanthropy ==
Through the company's Grand Circle Foundation, which consists of the Lewis Family Foundation, millions of dollars have been pledged toward education and preservation since 1992. In 2007, Harriet Lewis founded a program called Next Generation Leaders, that gives internships to students from Boston at the Grand Circle office. In 2012, O.A.T. pledged $600,000 to benefit WBUR, which was the largest donation in the station's history.
