= Oates Canyon =

Undersea canyon in Antarctica

Oates Canyon (68°0′S 164°30′E) is an undersea canyon on the continental rise east of Iselin Bank in Antarctica. Its name (approved June 1988 (ACUF 228)) is associated with Oates Coast.
