= Sviblovo (Moscow Metro) =

Moscow Metro station

Sviblovo Свиблово
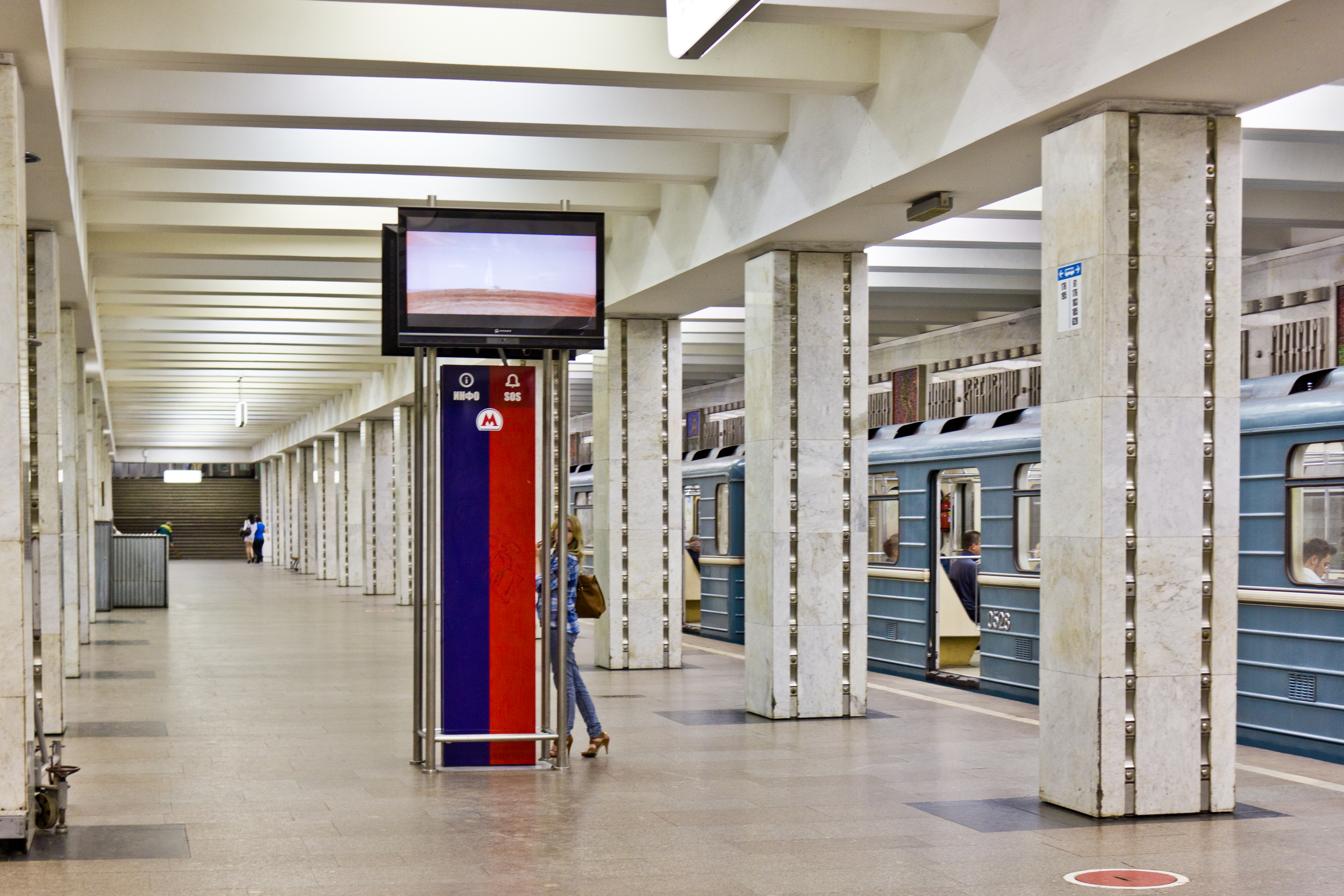

General information
- Location: Sviblovo District; North-Eastern Administrative Okrug; Moscow; Russia
- Coordinates: 55.8552°N 37.6527°E
- System: Moscow Metro station
- Owner: Moskovsky Metropoliten
- Line: Kaluzhsko-Rizhskaya line
- Platforms: 1 island platform
- Tracks: 2
- Connections: bus: 61, 176, 185, 195, 380, 428, 628, н6

Construction
- Structure type: Shallow column tri-vault
- Depth: 8 metres (26 ft)
- Platform levels: 1
- Parking: No

Other information
- Station code: 088, Sv

History
- Opened: 29 September 1978; 47 years ago

Passengers
- 2009: 15 088 735

Services
Preceding station	Moscow Metro	Following station
Botanichesky Sad towards Novoyasenevskaya	Kaluzhsko-Rizhskaya line	Babushkinskaya towards Medvedkovo
Route map
Location
- Location within Moscow Metro

Sviblovo (Russian: Свиблово) is a Moscow Metro station in the Sviblovo District, North-Eastern Administrative Okrug, Moscow. It is on the Kaluzhsko-Rizhskaya Line, between Botanichesky Sad and Babushkinskaya stations. It was opened on 29 September 1978.

== Design ==
Built according to a standard design in 1978, the station features pillars faced with white marble and accented with vertical strips of anodized aluminum. The walls are also white marble and are decorated with friezes containing the names and coats of arms of the various cities and towns surrounding Moscow. Sviblovo's architect was Robert Pogrebnoi.

== Entrances ==
The entrances to the station are located on either side of Snezhnaya Ulitsa south of the intersection with Amundsena Ulitsa.

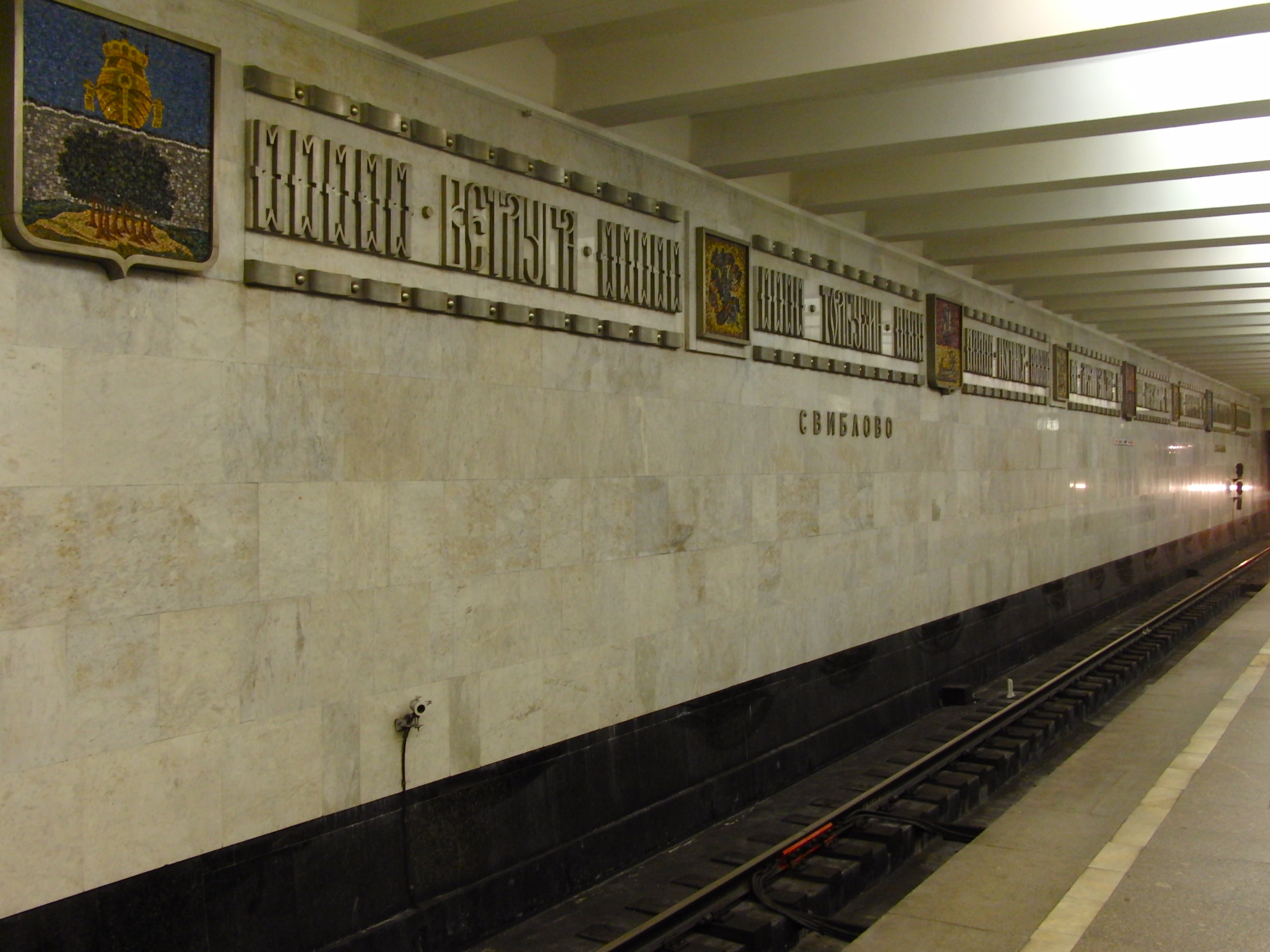
Platform
