= William Oates =

William Oates may refer to:

- William C. Oates (1835–1910), Confederate colonel during the American Civil War
- William Oates (Irish cricketer) (1852–1940), Irish first-class cricketer
- William Oates (cricketer, born 1862) (1862–1942), English cricketer
- William Oates (cricketer, born 1929) (1929–2001), English first-class cricketer
- William Wilfred Oates of Burns & Oates, British publishing house

== See also ==
- William Oats (1841–1911), Australian mining captain and politician
