= Oates Coast =

Shoreline in Antarctica

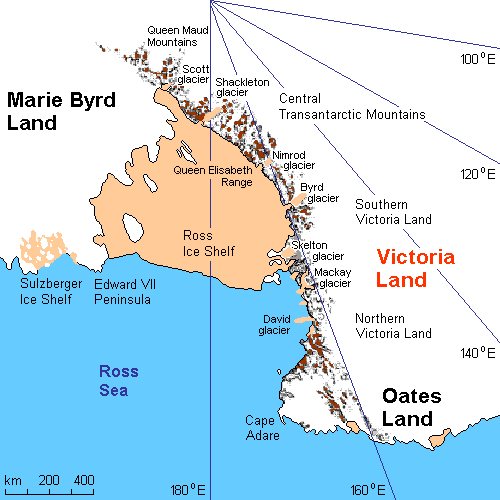
Area map of Oates land.

Oates Coast (69°30′S 159°0′E) is the portion of the coast of Antarctica between Cape Hudson and Cape Williams. It forms the coast of Oates Land, part of the Australian claim to the Antarctic. The eastern portion of this coast was discovered in February 1911 by Lieutenant Harry Pennell, Royal Navy, commander of the expedition ship Terra Nova during the British Antarctic Expedition, 1910–13. He named the coast after Captain Lawrence E.G. Oates who, with Captain Robert F. Scott and three British Antarctic Expedition companions, perished on the return journey from the South Pole in 1912. Captain Oates' death was described by Robert Falcon Scott as "the act of a brave man and English gentleman". The western portion of the coast, the vicinity of the Mawson Peninsula, was first delineated from air photos taken by U.S. Navy Operation Highjump, 1946–47.

== See also ==
- Oates Bank
- Oates Canyon
