= Polar aviation =

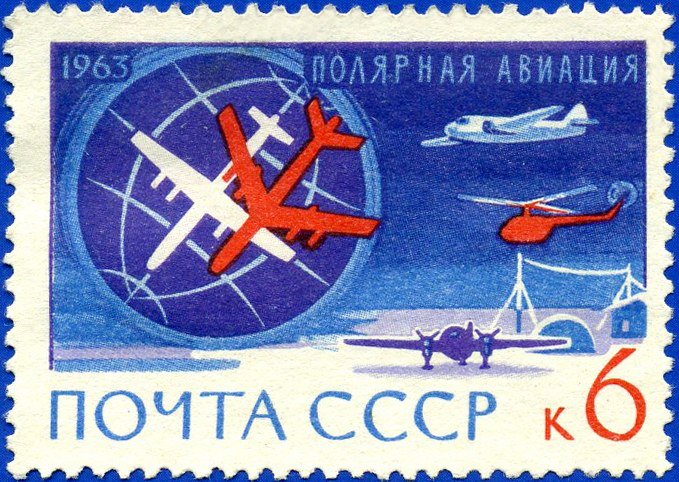
USSR 1963 postage stamp devoted to the Soviet polar aviation

Polar aviation refers to aviation in the polar regions of the Earth. Specifically, one may speak of Arctic aviation and Antarctic aviation in the Arctic and Antarctic respectively.

The major factors which define the character of polar aviation include remoteness from major populated areas, specific physical geography and climate. Specific factors include low temperatures, frequent changes of meteorological conditions, polar night, the uncertainty of magnetic compasses, difficulties in radio communication, and lack of landmarks.

== Early history ==
The dream of air travel to the Pole has a lengthy prehistory. As early as the 1870s, John Powles Cheyne, a veteran of three British Arctic expeditions, was proposing a voyage to the pole via balloon. Nevertheless, in terms of actual flight, S. A. Andrée's Arctic balloon expedition of 1897 is commonly considered to mark the beginning of polar aviation. Later, Zeppelins were used for exploitation of the Arctic, and eventually airplanes. In 1914, a Russian plane (Farman MF.11, pilot Jan Nagórski, mechanic Yevgeni Kuznetsov) flew beyond the Arctic Circle in the area of Novaya Zemlya in search of the North Pole expedition of Georgiy Sedov. The beginning of the century witnessed the aviation quest for the North Pole. By the mid-1920s polar aviation had become feasible.

== Antarctic aviation ==
The first powered flight over Antarctica was made by Hubert Wilkins and Carl Ben Eielson on 16 November 1928 in a Lockheed Vega 1. Departing from Deception Island, they flew a circuit over the Antarctic Peninsula and went on to conduct a number of aerial surveys over the following months.

Fokker Super Universal Virginia piloted by Richard Evelyn Byrd was the first aircraft to land on the mainland of Antarctica during Byrd's first Antarctic expedition, 1928–1930, when he was first to fly over the South Pole on November 29, 1929. Byrd used Ford Trimotors and other aircraft for aerial surveys and reconnaissance during his expeditions.

After World War II, military aviation played a significant role in exploration. Operation Highjump, led by Admiral Byrd, used U.S. Navy aircraft to extensively map large portions of Antarctica. Its primary objectives were scientific exploration, mapping, and training in a harsh and largely uncharted environment.

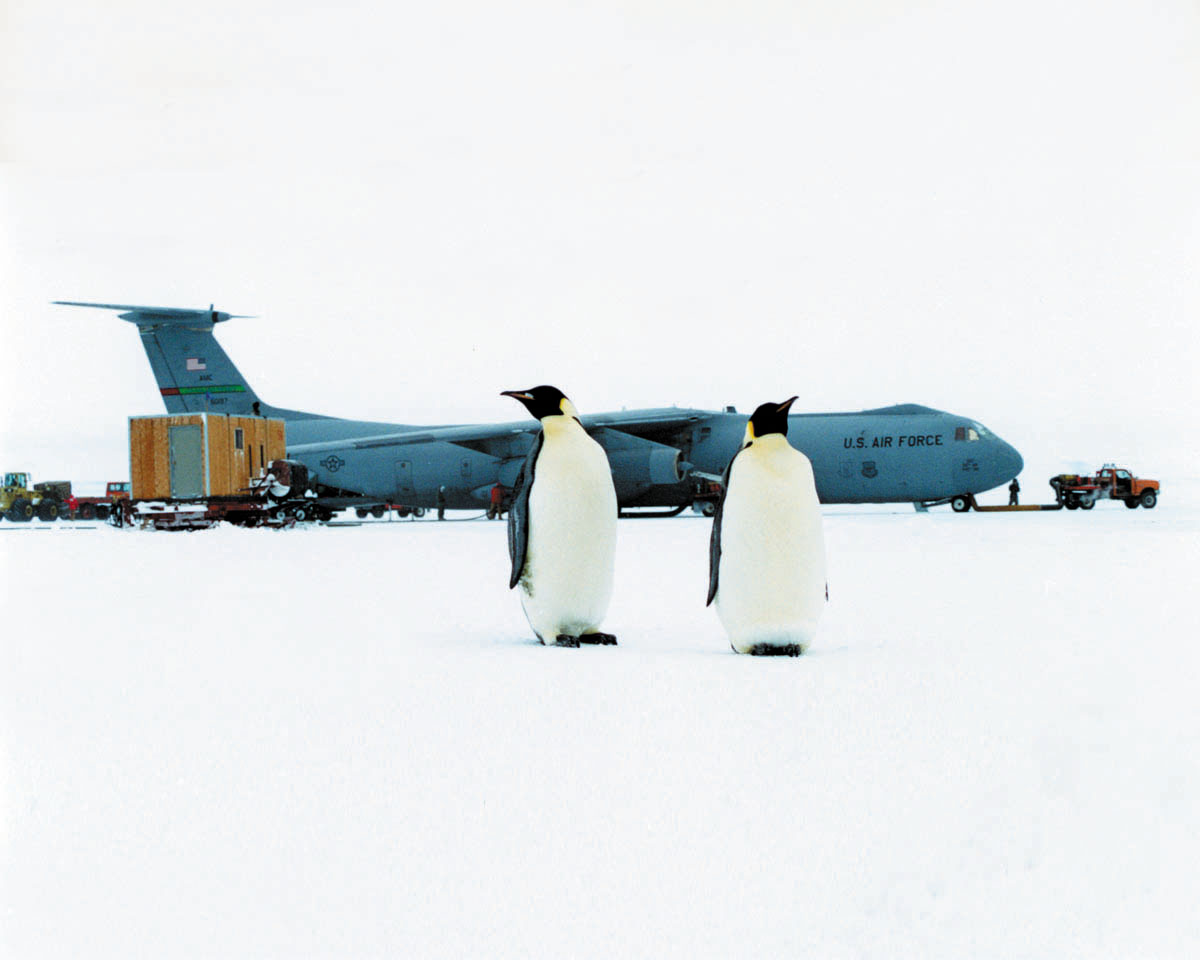
A US Air Force C-141 Starlifter participating in Operation Deep Freeze with penguins, 1997

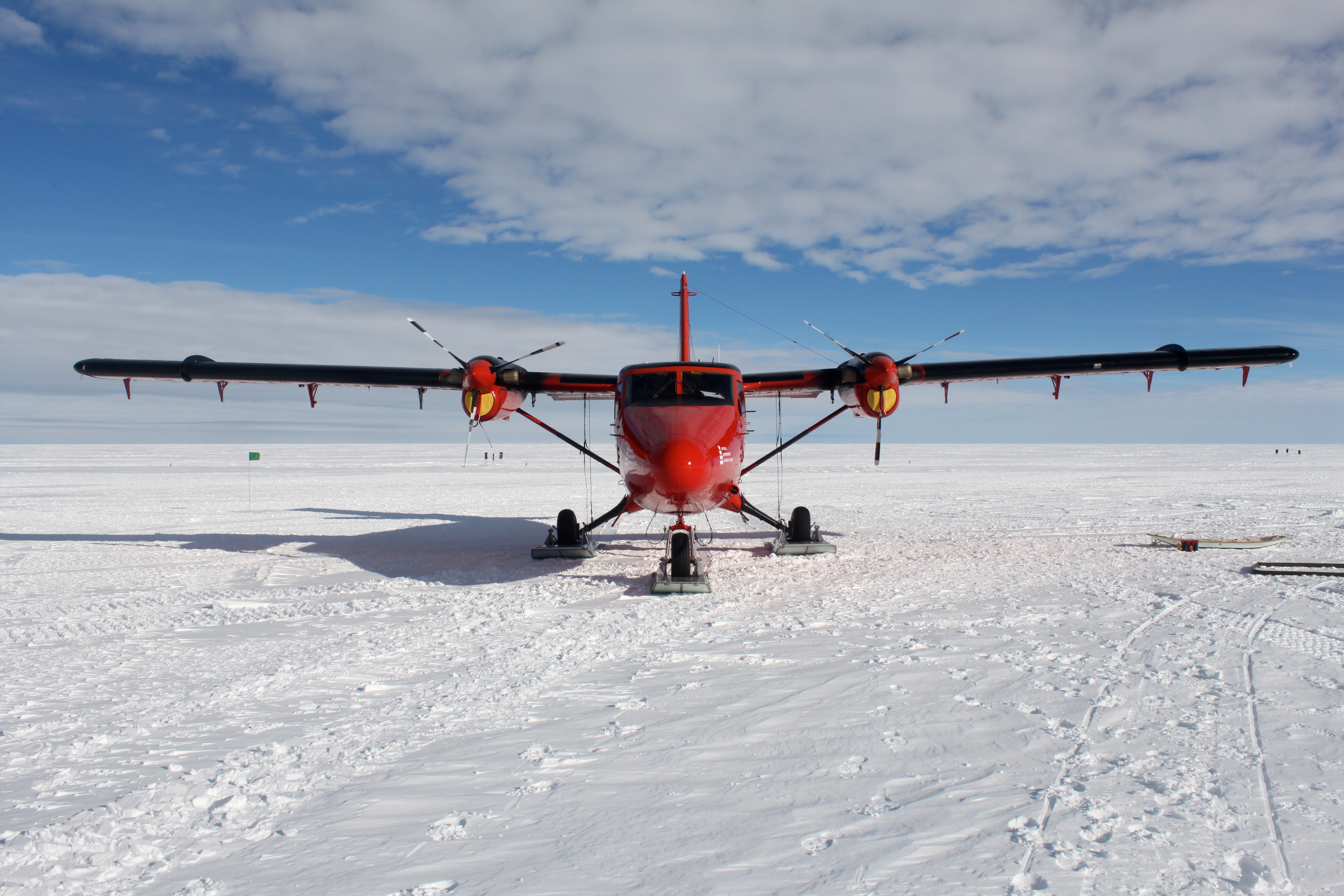
Twin Otter at the WAIS Divide field camp, 2012

The International Geophysical Year (IGY) in 1957-1958 marked a significant period for scientific research in Antarctica. Aircraft, including ski-equipped planes, were used for aerial surveys and transporting scientists. The Royal New Zealand Air Force (RNZAF) became actively involved in Antarctic aviation during this period.

During the 1960s-70s, there was a great development of Antarctic research programmes. Various countries established research stations in Antarctica, leading to an increased need for air support. The United States, in particular, utilized ski-equipped LC-130 Hercules aircraft to transport personnel and cargo to remote locations.

In the modern era, from 1990s onwards, technological advancements, including the use of satellite imagery, have improved navigation and safety in Antarctic aviation. Various countries operate specialised aircraft, including ski-equipped planes and helicopters, to support research activities and transport personnel. The use of long-range transport aircraft, like the Basler BT-67, has become common for reaching deep-field research sites.

== See also ==
- List of Russian aviators (includes polar aviators as well)
