= Sviblovo District =

Sviblovo District Свиблово
- District
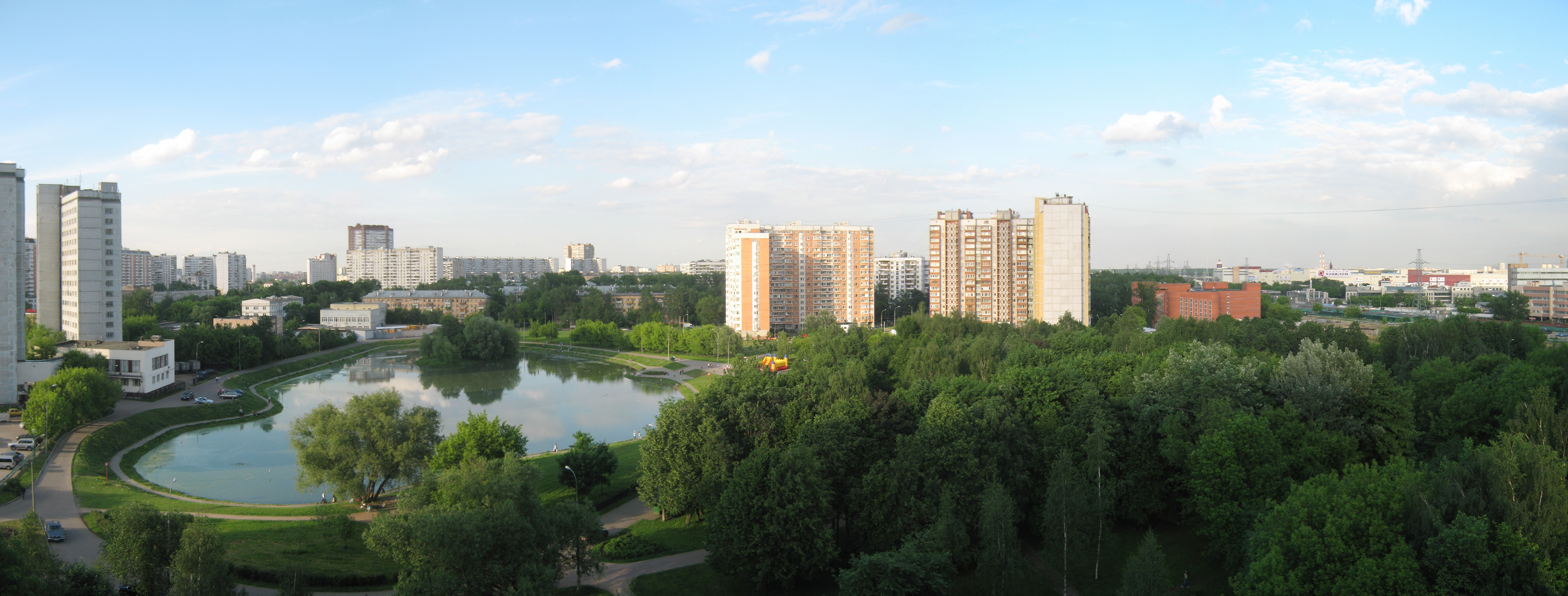

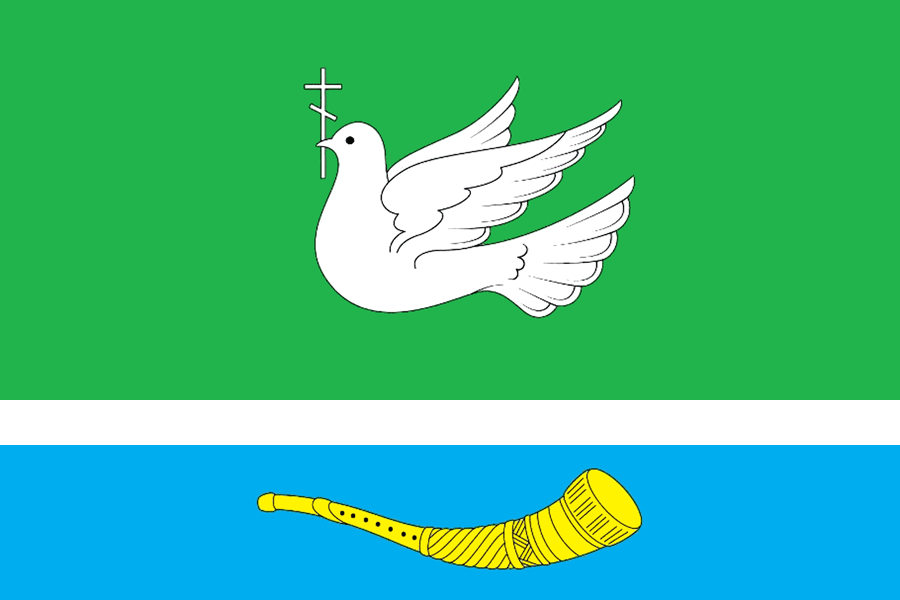
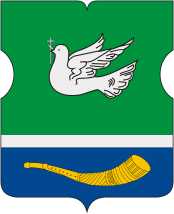
- Flag Coat of arms
- Location of Sviblovo District on the map of Moscow
- Coordinates: 55°51′6″N 37°38′24″E
- Country: Russia
- Federal subject: Moscow
- Established: July 5, 1995
- Time zone: UTC+3 (MSK)
- OKTMO ID: 45361000
- Website: http://sviblovo.mos.ru/

Sviblovo District (Russian: район Свиблово) is an administrative district (raion) of North-Eastern Administrative Okrug, and one of the 125 raions of Moscow, Russia. The area of the district is 4.41 square kilometers (1.70 sq mi).

== History ==
The first mention of a village near Moscow on the Yauza River, owned by Fyodor Sviblo, dates back to 1406. At that time, it was called Timofeyevskoye, and the name Sviblovo became established later.

On maps from 1850, the village was referred to as Svirlovo. It appears to have been a working-class settlement, as large cloth and paper factories were located nearby. In the 1930s, the TsNIIS Institute of Transport settlement was established in the northern part of modern Sviblovo. At that time, the area was part of the city of Babushkin.

During the Great Patriotic War, anti-tank obstacles known as "hedgehogs" were installed in the Institute of Transport settlement, playing a crucial role in the defense of Moscow. Anti-aircraft positions were set up behind the settlement on the left bank of the Yauza River, forming part of the capital's air defense system. In 1941, Red Army officers lived in the institute's main building, and a bomb shelter entrance for local residents was located in the courtyard. After the war, the settlement was rebuilt by German prisoners of war.

In 1945, the "Institute of Transport" station on the Beskudnikovo branch of the Moscow Railway was built, and the section between the "Losinoostrovskaya" and "Institute of Transport" stations was electrified. In 1955, electrification was extended to the section between "Institute of Transport" and "Beskudnikovo".

In the 1950s, a workers' settlement for the All-Union Agricultural Exhibition (VSKhV) was established on the territory of the former Sviblovo village:

The settlement consisted of thirty two-story houses with eight apartments each. All apartments were communal, with 18 families living in each house. Each house had a yard with sheds corresponding to the number of apartments. Our courtyards looked very cozy. The houses were not made of brick but of slag blocks, with wooden floors. <...> Heating was provided by firewood. <...> There were no proper streets, only three driveways, which were named 1st, 2nd, and 3rd Botanical.

The settlement was part of the Mytishchi District of the Moscow Region. Most of its residents were employees of the VSKhV and the Botanical Garden.

In 1960, Sviblovo was incorporated into Moscow. The new residential area required transport access to the city center. To develop tram connections, the dismantling of the Beskudnikovo Railway section began in stages starting in 1966. The metro reached Sviblovo only in the late 1970s. In 1978, the "Sviblovo" and "Botanichesky Sad" metro stations were built. At the same time, the wooden barracks of the former Institute of Transport settlement were demolished, and standard apartment buildings were constructed in their place. The Beskudnikovo Railway was finally closed and dismantled in 1987 due to the construction of the "Otradnoye" metro station in the neighboring district of the same name.

== See also ==
- Administrative divisions of Moscow
