= Lawrence Oates =

British explorer (1880–1912)

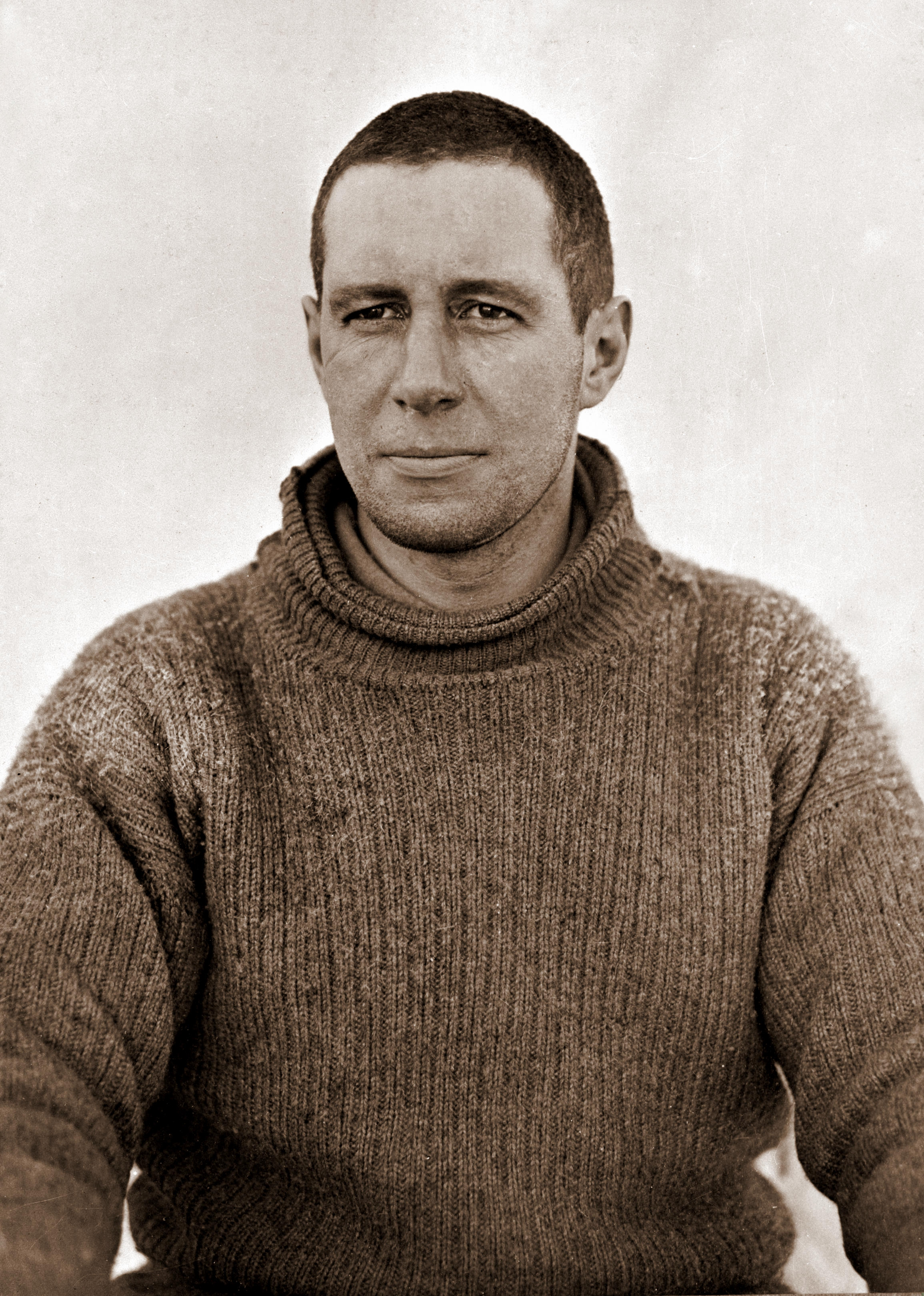
- Oates, c. 1911
- Born: Lawrence Edward Grace Oates; 17 March 1880; Putney, Surrey, England
- Died: 17 March 1912 (aged 32); Ross Ice Shelf, Antarctica
- Cause of death: Suicide by hypothermia
- Other name: Titus Oates
- Education: Eton College
- Occupations: Cavalry officer, explorer

Lawrence Edward Grace "Titus" Oates (17 March 1880 – 17 March 1912) was a British army officer, and later an Antarctic explorer, who died from hypothermia during the Terra Nova Expedition when he walked from his tent into a freezing blizzard. His death, which occurred on his 32nd birthday, is seen as an act of self-sacrifice when, aware that the gangrene and frostbite from which he was suffering was compromising his three companions' chances of survival, he chose certain death for himself to relieve them of the burden of caring for him.

== Early life ==
Oates was born in Putney, Surrey, in 1880, the elder son of William Edward Oates, FRGS, and Caroline Annie, daughter of Joshua Buckton, of West Lea, Meanwood, Leeds. The Oates family were wealthy landed gentry, having had land at Dewsbury and Leeds since the 16th century; William Oates moved the family to Gestingthorpe, Essex in 1891 after becoming Lord of the manor of Over Hall at Gestingthorpe. His sister Lillian, a year older, married the Irish baritone and actor Frederick Ranalow. An uncle was the naturalist and African explorer Frank Oates.

Oates lived in Putney from 1885–1891. He was one of the first pupils to attend the nearby Willington School. He went on to Eton College but left after less than two years owing to ill health. He then attended an army "crammer", South Lynn School, Eastbourne. His father died of typhoid fever in Madeira in 1896.

== Military career ==
In 1898, Oates was commissioned into the 3rd (Militia) Battalion of the West Yorkshire Regiment. He saw active service during the Second Boer War as a junior officer in the 6th (Inniskilling) Dragoons, having been transferred to that cavalry regiment as a second lieutenant in May 1900. He took part in operations in the Transvaal, the Orange River Colony, and Cape Colony. In March 1901 a gunshot wound shattered his left thigh bone, leaving it an inch shorter than the right. Twice called upon to surrender in that engagement, he replied, "We came to fight, not to surrender." He was recommended for the Victoria Cross for his actions and was brought to public attention.

"One or two of us went out to Wynberg, which Oates knew well, having been invalided there in the South African War with a broken leg, the result of a fight against big odds when, his whole party wounded, he refused to surrender. He told me later how he had thought he would bleed to death, and the man who lay next to him was convinced he had a bullet in the middle of his brain—he could feel it wobbling about there! Just now his recollections only went so far as to tell of a badly wounded Boer who lay in the next bed to him when he was convalescent, and how the Boer insisted on getting up to open the door for him every time he left the ward, much to his own discomfort." - Excerpt from The Worst Journey in the World by Apsley Cherry-Garrard, another member of the Terra Nova expedition.

He was promoted to lieutenant in 1902, and left Cape Town for England after peace was signed in South Africa. He was mentioned in despatches by Lord Kitchener in his final despatch dated 23 June 1902. He was promoted to captain in 1906, and served in Ireland, Egypt, and India. He was often referred to by the nickname "Titus Oates", after the historical figure.

== Terra Nova expedition ==
=== Preparation ===
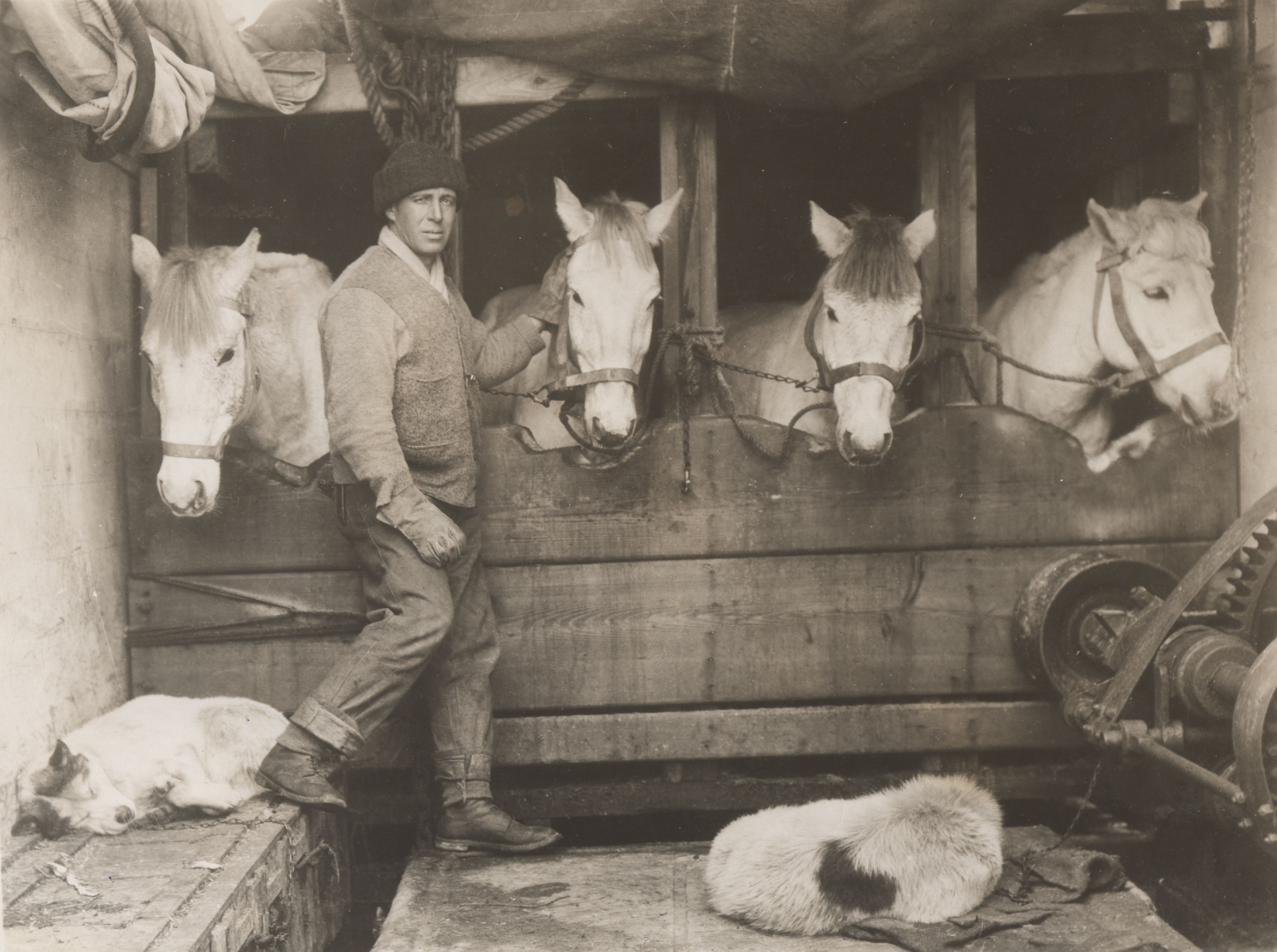
Oates's primary task on the expedition was to attend to its horses.

In 1910, he applied to join Robert Falcon Scott's expedition to the South Pole—the Terra Nova expedition—and was accepted mainly on the strength of his experience with horses and, to a lesser extent, his ability to make a financial contribution of £1,000 (equivalent to £102,000 in 2025) towards the expedition. Nicknamed "the soldier" by his fellow expedition members, his role was to look after the 19 ponies that Scott intended to use for sledge hauling during the initial food depot-laying stage and the first half of the trip to the South Pole. Apsley Cherry-Garrard referred to him as "a man who had forgotten as much as most men know about horses." Scott eventually selected him as one of the five-man party who would travel the final distance to the Pole. Belgrave Edward Sutton Ninnis, a fellow polar explorer who accompanied Douglas Mawson on the Australasian Antarctic Expedition, described Oates in his diary as "distinguished, simple-minded." Ninnis also expressed concern that Oates was the wrong man for the job.

A sledge flag which was drawn up for Oates prior to the Terra Nova Expedition, but never actually made for him to use. Oates was thus one of the few prominent members of the expedition not to have a sledge flag.

From the beginning of the voyage, Oates was initially not a popular member onboard the Terra Nova. According to Ninnis, testimonials from crew members onboard indicated that during the voyage out "he [Oates] did not, by general affectation, increase his popularity with the fellows on board" and that "....[if] Oates gets unpopular with the other fellows, his life, cooped up with them in the hut on McMurdo Sound, will certainly not be a bed of roses." and that "....unless he pulls himself together a bit, he will find himself "returned, not wanted." Oates also clashed with Scott many times on issues of management of the expedition. "Their natures jarred on one another", expedition member Frank Debenham recalled. When he first saw the ponies that Scott had brought on the expedition, Oates was horrified at the £5 animals, which he said were too old for the job and "a wretched load of crocks." He later said: "Scott's ignorance about marching with animals is colossal." He also wrote in his diary "Myself, I dislike Scott intensely and would chuck the whole thing if it were not that we are a British expedition ... He is not straight, it is himself first, the rest nowhere ..." However, he also wrote that his harsh words were often a product of the hard conditions. Scott, less harshly, called Oates "the cheery old pessimist", adding: "the Soldier takes a gloomy view of everything, but I've come to see that this is a characteristic of him."

=== South Pole ===
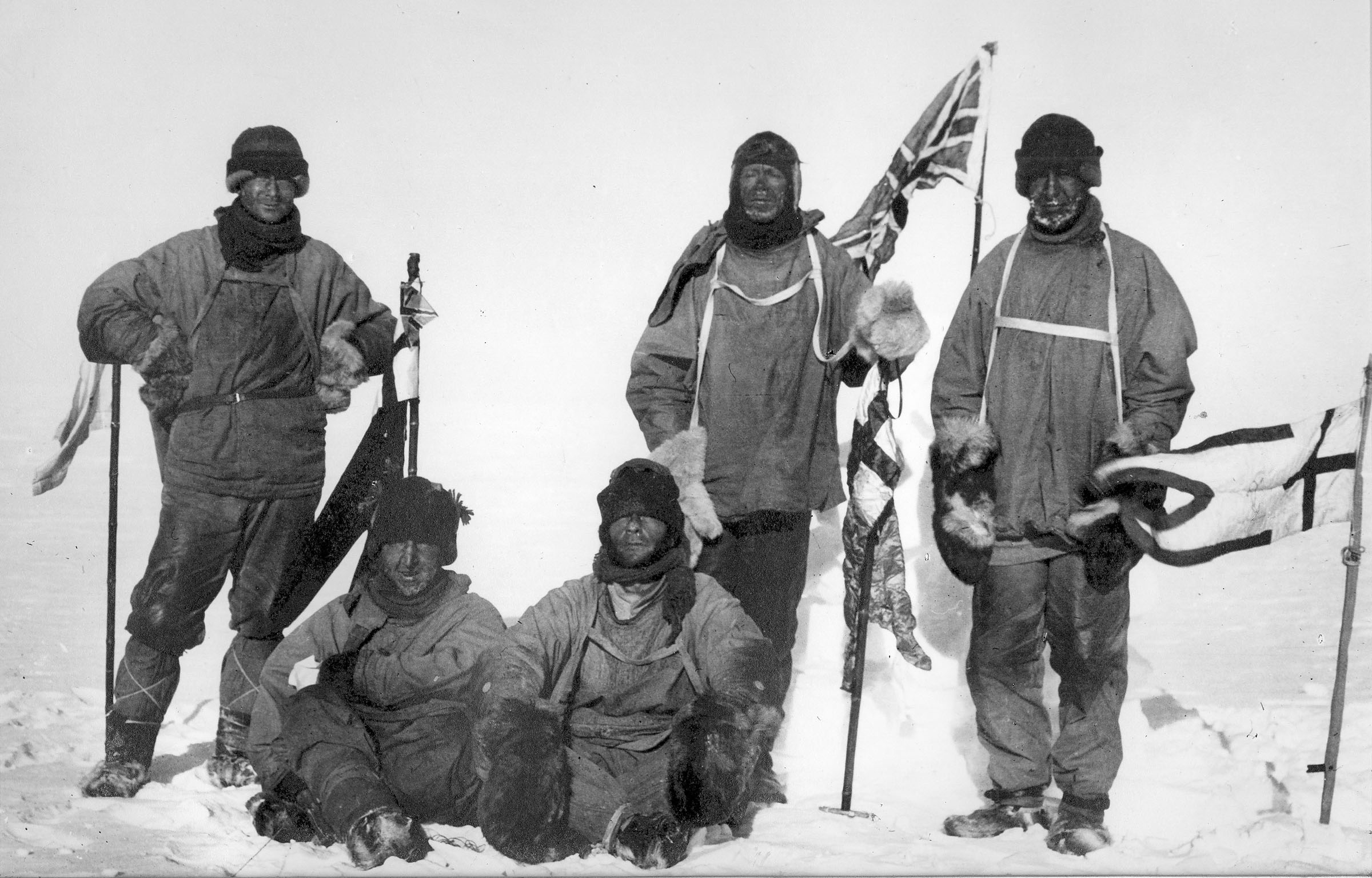
Oates (far right) at the South Pole on 18 January 1912 as part of the Terra Nova Expedition. From left to right: Wilson, Bowers, Evans, Scott and Oates.

Scott, Oates and 14 other members of the expedition set off from their Cape Evans base camp for the South Pole on 1 November 1911. At various pre-determined latitude points during the 895-mile (1,440 km) journey, the support members of the expedition were sent back by Scott in teams. On 4 January 1912, at latitude 87° 32' S, only the five-man polar party consisting of Scott, Edward Wilson, Henry Bowers, Edgar Evans and Oates remained to march the last 167 miles (269 km) to the Pole.

On 18 January 1912 they finally reached the Pole—only to discover a tent that Norwegian explorer Roald Amundsen and his four-man team had left behind at their Polheim camp, after beating them in the race to the Pole. Inside the tent was a note from Amundsen informing them that his party had reached the South Pole on 14 December 1911, beating Scott's party by 35 days.

=== Return ===
Route taken by Scott's polar party Route taken by Amundsen's polar party

Scott's party faced extremely difficult conditions on the return journey, mainly due to the exceptionally adverse weather, poor food supply, injuries sustained from falls, and the effects of scurvy and frostbite. On 17 February 1912, near the foot of the Beardmore Glacier, Edgar Evans died, perhaps from a blow to the head suffered in a fall days earlier.

On 15 March, Oates told his companions that he could not go on and proposed that they leave him in his sleeping bag, which they refused to do. He managed a few more miles that day but his condition worsened that night.

==== Death ====
According to Scott's diary entry of 16 or 17 March (Scott was unsure of the date but thought 17 March correct), Oates had walked out of the tent the previous day into a −40 °F (−40 °C) blizzard to his death. Scott wrote in his diary: "We knew that poor Oates was walking to his death, but though we tried to dissuade him, we knew it was the act of a brave man and an English gentleman." According to Scott's diary, as Oates left the tent he said, "I am just going outside and may be some time."

Scott, Wilson and Bowers continued onwards for a further 20 miles (32 km) towards the One Ton food depot that could save them but were halted at latitude 79° 40' S by a fierce blizzard on 20 March. Trapped in their tent and too weak and cold to continue, they died nine days later, eleven miles (18 km) short of their objective. Their frozen bodies were discovered by a search party on 12 November; Oates's body was never found. Near where he was presumed to have died, the search party erected a cairn and cross bearing the inscription: "Hereabouts died a very gallant gentleman, Captain L. E. G. Oates, of the Inniskilling Dragoons. In March 1912, returning from the Pole, he walked willingly to his death in a blizzard, to try and save his comrades, beset by hardships."

== Legacy ==
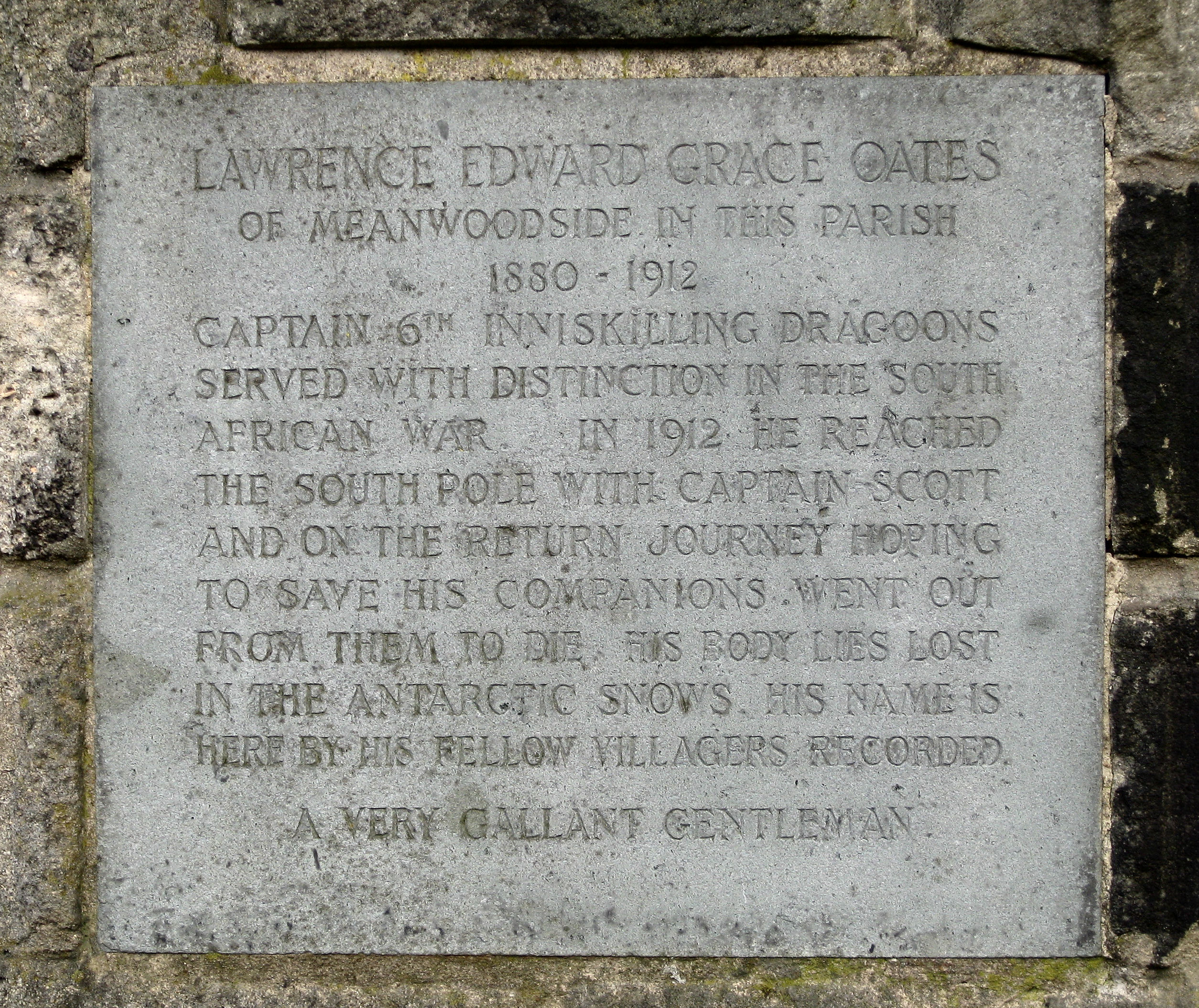
Monument to Oates, close to Holy Trinity Church, Meanwood, Leeds

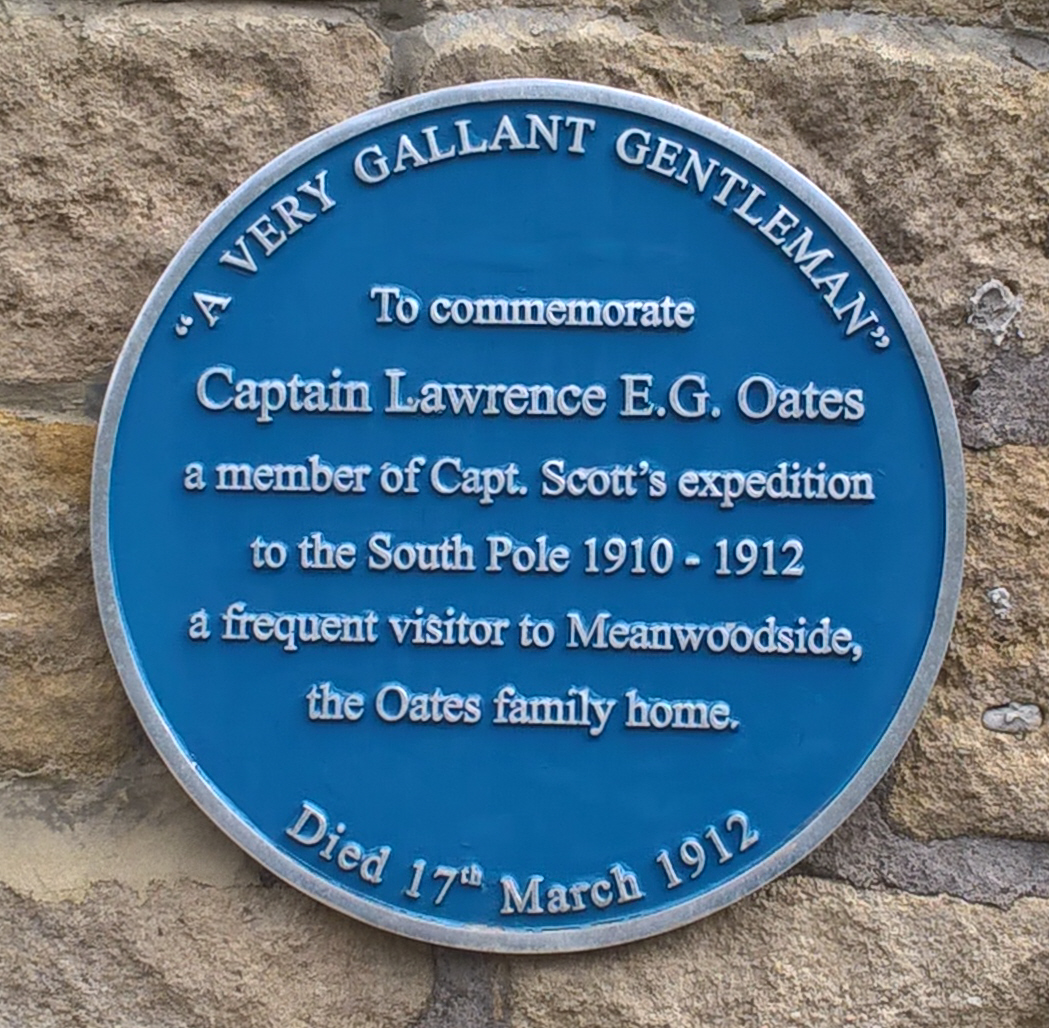
Lawrence Oates blue plaque Meanwood

Oates's act of self-sacrifice is often considered to be one of the most memorable examples of its kind in recent history, and his understated final words are often cited as a veritable example of the traditional characteristic of British people concerning the "stiff upper lip" attitude.

Oates's reindeer-skin sleeping bag was recovered and is now displayed in the museum of the Scott Polar Research Institute in Cambridge with other items from the expedition. The Oates Museum at Gilbert White's House, Selborne, Hampshire focuses on the lives of Lawrence Oates and his uncle Frank.

The Royal Dragoon Guards, the successor to the 6th (Inniskilling) Dragoons, have a regimental day on 17 March, his birthday and St Patrick's Day, to remember Oates. His Queen's South Africa Medal with bars and Polar Medal are held by the regimental museum in York. The then Inniskilling Dragoon Guards were reportedly given £20,000 to help purchase the medals by Sir Jack Hayward.

In 1913 his fellow officers erected a brass memorial plaque to him in the parish church of St Mary the Virgin in Gestingthorpe, Essex, which his mother, Caroline, polished weekly for the rest of her life. The church is opposite his family home of Gestingthorpe Hall.

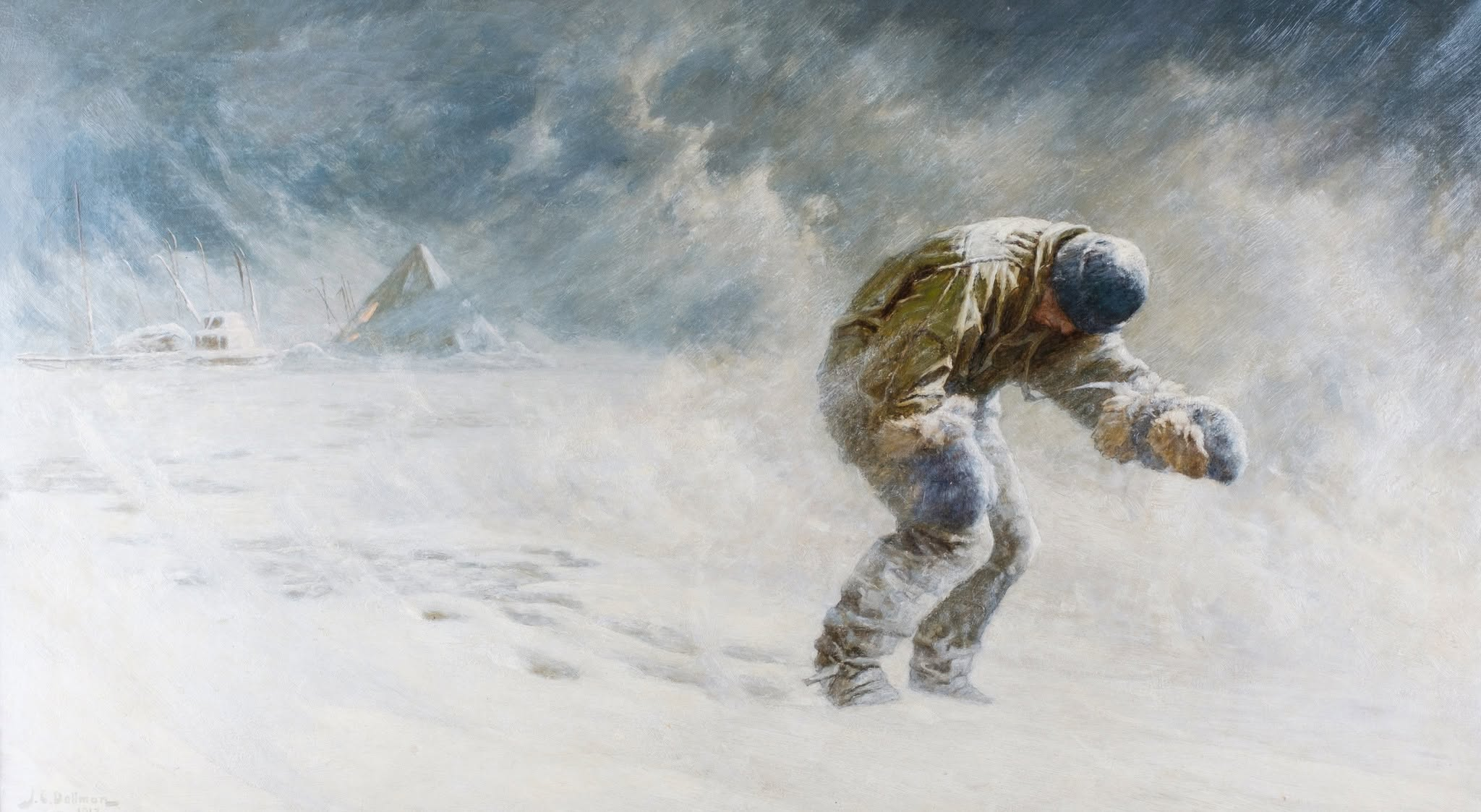
A Very Gallant Gentleman (John Charles Dollman, 1913)

A painting of Oates walking out to his death, A Very Gallant Gentleman, by John Charles Dollman, hangs in the Cavalry Club in London. It was commissioned by officers of the Inniskilling Dragoons in 1913. It was exhibited at the Royal Academy in 1914. A preparatory sketch is in the Scott Polar Research Institute, at the University of Cambridge, having been sold by Christie's, on behalf of a private owner, for £40,000 in 2014.

In May 1914 a memorial to Oates was placed in the cloister of the newly built School Library at Eton College, itself part of the Boer War Memorial Buildings. It was executed by Kathleen Scott, the widow of the expedition's leader.

The Lawrence Oates school in Meanwood, Leeds (closed 1992), was named after him. On the 100th anniversary of his death, a blue plaque was unveiled in his honour at Meanwood Park, Leeds.

On 17 March 2007, The Putney Society unveiled a blue plaque at the site of Oates's childhood home of 263 Upper Richmond Road, Putney, London. The current address is 307 Upper Richmond Road.

Mount Oates in the Southern Alps of New Zealand is named after him.

== See also ==
- Oates Coast

== Notes ==
=== Sources ===
- Smith, Michael I Am Just Going Outside. ISBN 1-903464-12-9
- Scott's Last Expedition Vols I and II Smith, Elder & Co 1913 (Vol I is Scott's diary)
- Preston, Diana: A First Rate Tragedy. ISBN 0-618-00201-4
- Huntford, Roland: The Last Place on Earth. ISBN 0-689-70701-0
- Scott, Robert Falcon: Scott's Last Expedition: The Journals. ISBN 0-413-52230-X
- McCaughrean, Geraldine: The White Darkness. ISBN 0-19-271983-1
- Limb, Sue & Cordingley, Patrick: Captain Oates: Soldier and Explorer. ISBN 0-7134-2693-4
- Goldsmith, Jeremy: British Army officers' records; Career Soldiers in the Family Tree Magazine (London) of June 2007, which shows Oates's Record of Service (with a birth date of 16 March 1880).
